= Botany of Fuegia, the Falklands, Kerguelen's Land, Etc. =

Book by Joseph Dalton Hooker

- Author: Joseph Dalton Hooker
- Illustrator: Walter Hood Fitch
- Language: English
- Series: Monthly parts
- Subject: Botany
- Publisher: Reeve Brothers
- Publication date: 1845 – 1847
- Publication place: England

The Botany of Fuegia, the Falklands, Kerguelen's Land, Etc. is a description of the plants discovered in these islands during the Ross expedition written by Joseph Dalton Hooker and published by Reeve Brothers in London between 1845 and 1847. Hooker sailed on HMS Erebus as assistant surgeon. It was the second in a series of four Floras in the Flora Antarctica, the others being the Flora of Lord Auckland and Campbell's Islands (1843-1845), the Flora Novae-Zelandiae (1851–1853), and the Flora Tasmaniae (1853–1859). They were "splendidly" illustrated by Walter Hood Fitch.

The larger part of the plant specimens collected during the Ross expedition are now part of the Kew Herbarium.

== Context ==
The British government fitted out an expedition led by James Clark Ross to investigate magnetism and marine geography in high southern latitudes, which sailed with two ships, HMS Terror and HMS Erebus on 29 September 1839 from Chatham.

The ships arrived, after several stops, at the Cape of Good Hope on 4 April 1840. On 21 April the giant kelp Macrocystis pyrifera was found off Marion Island, but no landfall could be made there or on the Crozet Islands due to the harsh winds. On 12 May the ships anchored at Christmas Harbour for two and a half months, during which all the plant species previously encountered by James Cook on the Kerguelen Islands were collected. On 16 August they reached the River Derwent, remaining in Tasmania until 12 November. A week later the flotilla stopped at Lord Auckland's Islands and Campbell's Island for the spring months.

Large floating forests of Macrocystis and Durvillaea were found until the ships ran into icebergs at latitude 61° S. Pack-ice was met at 68° S and longitude 175°. During this part of the voyage Victoria Land, Mount Erebus and Mount Terror were discovered. After returning to Tasmania for three months, the flotilla went via Sydney to the Bay of Islands, and stayed for three months in New Zealand to collect plants there. After visiting other islands, the ships returned to the Cape of Good Hope on 4 April 1843. At the end of the journey specimens of some fifteen hundred plant species had been collected and preserved.

== Distinct flora ==
According to Hooker, the flora of New Zealand's Antarctic islands is so different from that of the remainder of the territories visited during the voyage, that it merits a separate description. An exemplary difference is the dominance of Asteraceae in New Zealand's islands, and absence of representatives of the Rubiaceae, while the reverse is true for those two plant families on the other Antarctic archipelagos. So the Flora Antarctica describes in its second part the plants of Tierra del Fuego and the south-western coast of Patagonia, the Falkland Islands, Palmer's Land, South Shetlands, South Georgia, Tristan da Cunha, and Kerguelen's Land.

== Species ==
Hooker collected the following plants from the lands named in the book's title.

=== Seedplants ===
- Adesmia lotoides Hook.f. (Strait of Magellan, Cape Gregory, Elisabeth island)
- Adesmia pumila Hook.f. (Strait of Magellan, Port Gregory, Cabo Negro)
- Anemone decapetala Ard. (Patagonia)
- Arenaria media (Cabo Tres Montes, St. Salvador Bay on the Falklands) = Spergularia media (L.) C.Presl
- Arabis macloviana Hook. (Falklands)
- Azara lanceolata Hook.f. (South Chile, Cabo Tres Montes)
- Berberis buxifolia Lam. (Strait of Magellan, Tierra del Fuego) = Berberis microphylla G. Forst.
- Berberis empetrifolia Lam. (Strait of Magellan, Port Famine)
- Berberis ilicifolia Forst. (Strait of Magellan, Tierra del Fuego)
- Caltha appendiculata Pers. (Tierra del Fuego)
- Caltha dionaeifolia Hook. (Hermite Islands)
- Caltha sagittata Cavanilles (Tierra del Fuego, Port Famine, Hermite Islands, Falklands)
- Cardamine geranifolia DC. (Strait of Magellan, Tierra del Fuego, Port Famine, Hermite Islands)
- Cardamine hirsuta L. (Tierra del Fuego, Falklands, Tristan da Cunha)
- Cerastium arvense L. (Tierra del Fuego, Falklands)
- Cerastium vulgatum (Falklands) = C. fontanum Baumg.
- Colletia discolor Hook. = Discaria chacaye (G.Don) Tortosa
- Colobanthus crassifolius (Strait of Magellan, Cape Horn, Cape Famine, Hermite Islands, Falklands) = Colobanthus quitensis (Kunth) Bartl.
- Colobanthus diffusus Hook.f. (Amsterdam Island)
- Colobanthus kerguelensis Hook.f. (Kerguellen Islands)
- Colobanthus subulatus (d’Urv.) Hook.f. (Good Success Bay, Hermite Islands, Cape Horn, Tierra del Fuego, Falklands)
- Draba falklandica (Falklands) = Draba magellanica Lam.
- Draba funiculosa Hook.f.
- Draba incana var. magellanica (Strait of Magellan) = Draba magellanica
- Drimys winteri Forst. (Strait of Magellan, Tierra del Fuego)
- Drosera uniflora Willd. (Strait of Magellan, Port Famine)
- Geranium intermedium Bert., 1832, non James, 1823 (Chonos Archipelago) = Geranium berteroanum Colla, 1834
- Geranium magellanicum Hook.f. (Strait of Magellan, Elizabeth Island)
- Geranium patagonicum Hook.f. (Strait of Magellan, Port Famine) = G. berteroanum
- Geranium sessiliflorum Cav. (Strait of Magellan, Cabo Negro)
- Hamadryas argentea Hook.f. (Falklands)
- Hamadryas kingii Hook.f. (Strait of Magellan)
- Hamadryas magelhanica Lam. (Strait of Magellan)
- Lychnis magellanica (Strait of Magellan, Port Famine, Cabo Negro) = Silene magellanica (Desr.) Bocquet
- Myginda distycha = Maytenus disticha (Hook.f.) Urb. (Strait of Magellan, Port Famine)
- Maytenus magellanica (Magellan's mayten) (Lam.) Hook.f. (Strait of Magellan, Port Famine)
- Oxalis enneaphylla Cav. (Falklands)
- Oxalis magellanica Forst. (Cabo Tres Montes, Hermite Islands)
- Pringlea antiscorbutica R.Br. (Kerguellen Islands) (Kerguelen cabbage)
- Ranunculus biternatus Duch. (Patagonia, Falklands, Hermite Islands)
- Ranunculus chilensis DC. (Cabo Tres Montes, Chonos Archipelago)
- Ranunculus crassipes Hook.f. (Kerguellen Islands)
- Ranunculus maclovianus d'Urv. (Falklands)
- Ranunculus peduncularis Sm. (Strait of Magellan)
- Ranunculus sericocephalus Hook.f. (Falklands)
- Ranunculus hydrophilus Gaud. (Falklands)
- Ranunculus trullifolius Hook.f. (Falklands)
- Sagina procumbens L. (Strait of Magellan)
- Senebierra australis Hook.f. (Chonos Archipellago) = Lepidium pseudodidymus Thell. ex Druce
- Sisymbrium magellanicum (Strait of Magellan) = Polypsecadium magellanicum (Juss. ex Pers.) Al-Shehbaz
- Sisymbrium sophia (Strait of Magellan, Cape Negro) = Descurainia sophia (L.) Webb ex Prantl
- Stellaria debilis d'Urv (Isla de los Estados, Falklands)
- Stellaria lanceolata Poir. (Strait of Magellan)
- Stellaria media (Falklands, Amsterdam Island) (probably introduced)
- Stellaria rotundifolia (Strait of Magellan) = Drymaria rotundifolia A.Gray
- Thlaspi magellanicum Pers. non Comm. ex Poir. (Strait of Magellan)
- Viola maculata Cav. (Strait of Magellan)
- Viola magellanica Forst. (South part of Tierra del Fuego, Isla de los Estados, Falklands)
- Viola commersonii DC. ex Ging. (Strait of Magellan, Port Gallant, South part of Tierra del Fuego)
- Viola tridentata Menz. (Isla de los Estados, Port Famine, Hermite Islands, Falklands).
