= Flora Tasmaniae =

Book by Joseph Dalton Hooker

- Author: Joseph Dalton Hooker
- Illustrator: Walter Hood Fitch
- Language: English
- Series: Monthly parts
- Subject: Botany
- Publisher: Reeve Brothers
- Publication date: 1853 – 1859
- Publication place: England

The Flora Tasmaniae is a description of the plants discovered in Tasmania during the Ross expedition written by Joseph Dalton Hooker and published by Reeve Brothers in London between 1855 and 1860. Hooker sailed on HMS Erebus as assistant surgeon. Written in two volumes, it was the last in a series of four Floras in the Flora Antarctica, the others being the Botany of Lord Auckland's Group and Campbell's Island (1843–1845), the Botany of Fuegia, the Falklands, Kerguelen's Land, Etc. (1845–47), and the Flora Novae-Zelandiae (1851–1853). They were "splendidly" illustrated by Walter Hood Fitch.

The larger part of the plant specimens collected during the Ross expedition are now part of the Kew Herbarium.

Although Hooker professed not to have changed his views on Darwin's theory of evolution by natural selection, the book contains an introductory essay on biogeography written from a Darwinian point of view, making the book the first case study for the theory.

== Context ==
The British government fitted out an expedition led by James Clark Ross to investigate magnetism and marine geography in high southern latitudes, which sailed with two ships, HMS Terror and HMS Erebus on 29 September 1839 from Chatham.

The ships arrived, after several stops, at the Cape of Good Hope on 4 April 1840. On 21 April the giant kelp Macrocystis pyrifera was found off Marion Island, but no landfall could be made there or on the Crozet Islands due to the harsh winds. On 12 May the ships anchored at Christmas Harbour for two and a half months, during which all the plant species previously encountered by James Cook on the Kerguelen Islands were collected. On 16 August they reached the River Derwent, collecting plants in Tasmania until 12 November. A week later the flotilla stopped at Lord Auckland's Islands and Campbell's Island for the spring months.

Large floating forests of Macrocystis and Durvillaea were found until the ships ran into icebergs at latitude 61° S. Pack-ice was met at 68° S and longitude 175°. During this part of the voyage Victoria Land, Mount Erebus and Mount Terror were discovered. After returning to Tasmania for three months, the flotilla went via Sydney to the Bay of Islands, and stayed for three months in New Zealand. After visiting other islands, the ships returned to the Cape of Good Hope on 4 April 1843. At the end of the journey specimens of some fifteen hundred plant species had been collected and preserved.

== Book ==
The 930-page Flora Tasmaniae was published between 1855 and 1860. Hooker dedicated it to the local naturalists Ronald Campbell Gunn and William Archer, noting that "This Flora of Tasmania .. owes so much to their indefatigable exertions". Although the book is sometimes stated to have been published in 1859, the dedication is dated January 1860. It made use of plants collected by the local naturalist Robert Lawrence as well as Gunn and Archer.

- Volume 1 Dicotyledones (550 pages, 758 species, 100 plates, 138 species figured)
- Volume 2 Monocotyledones and Acotyledones (422 pages, 1445 species, 100 plates, 274 species figured)

The book begins with an "Introductory Essay" on biogeography. It is followed by a "Key to the Natural Orders of Tasmanian Flowering Plants" and a more detailed key to the genera. The Flora proper begins with the first order, the Ranunculaceae.

== Impact ==
Hooker's Flora Tasmaniae was "the first published case study supporting Charles Darwin’s theory of natural selection". It contained a "milestone essay on biogeography", "one of the first major public endorsements of the theory [of evolution by natural selection]". Hooker gradually changed his mind on evolution as he wrote up his findings from the Ross expedition. While he asserted that "my own views on the subjects of the variability of existing species" remain "unaltered from those which I maintained in the 'Flora of New Zealand'", the Flora Tasmaniae is written from a Darwinian perspective that effectively assumes natural selection, or as Hooker named it, the "variation" theory, to be correct.
