= Pterostylis puberula =

Dwarf greenhood

Scientific classification
- Kingdom: Plantae
- Clade: Tracheophytes
- Clade: Angiosperms
- Clade: Monocots
- Order: Asparagales
- Family: Orchidaceae
- Subfamily: Orchidoideae
- Tribe: Cranichideae
- Genus: Pterostylis
- Species: P. puberula

Binomial name
- Pterostylis puberula Hook.f.

Synonyms
- Linguella puberula (Hook.f.) D.L.Jones, M.A.Clem & Molloy

Species of orchid

Pterostylis puberula, commonly known as the dwarf greenhood or snail greenhood is a species of orchid which is endemic to New Zealand. It has a rosette of pale yellowish, stalked leaves and a single silvery-white and green flower with relatively long, erect lateral sepals.

== Description ==
Pterostylis puberula is a terrestrial, perennial, deciduous, herb with an underground tuber and a rosette of a large number of leaves. The leaves are egg-shaped, about 7 mm (0.3 in) long and 5 mm (0.2 in) on a petiole 5–7 mm (0.2–0.3 in). Flowering plants have a similar rosette at the base of the flowering stem, a single silvery-white flower with pale green stripes and one or two small leaves with their bases wrapped around the flowering stem. The stem is up to 200 mm (8 in) high. The dorsal sepal and petals are fused, forming a hood or "galea" over the column. The galea is 10–15 mm (0.4–0.6 in) tall, erect near its base then suddenly curves to about horizontal with a blunt or slightly pointed end. The lateral sepals are fused near their bases, almost closing the front of the flower and have erect, thread-like tips much taller than the galea. The labellum is not visible outside the intact flower. Flowering occurs in September and October.

== Taxonomy and naming ==
Pterostylis puberula was first formally described by Joseph Dalton Hooker and the description was published in Flora Novae-Zelandiae. The specific epithet (puberula) is a Latin word meaning "downy".

== Distribution and habitat ==
The dwarf greenhood grows in scrubland in disjunct populations on the North and South Islands and on the Three Kings Islands. It has recently only been sighted on Great Barrier Island, Surville Cliffs and near Thames.

== Conservation status ==
Pterostylis puberula is classed as "threatened – nationally vulnerable" under the New Zealand Threat Classification System.
