= Ross expedition =

1839–43 British Antarctic exploration mission

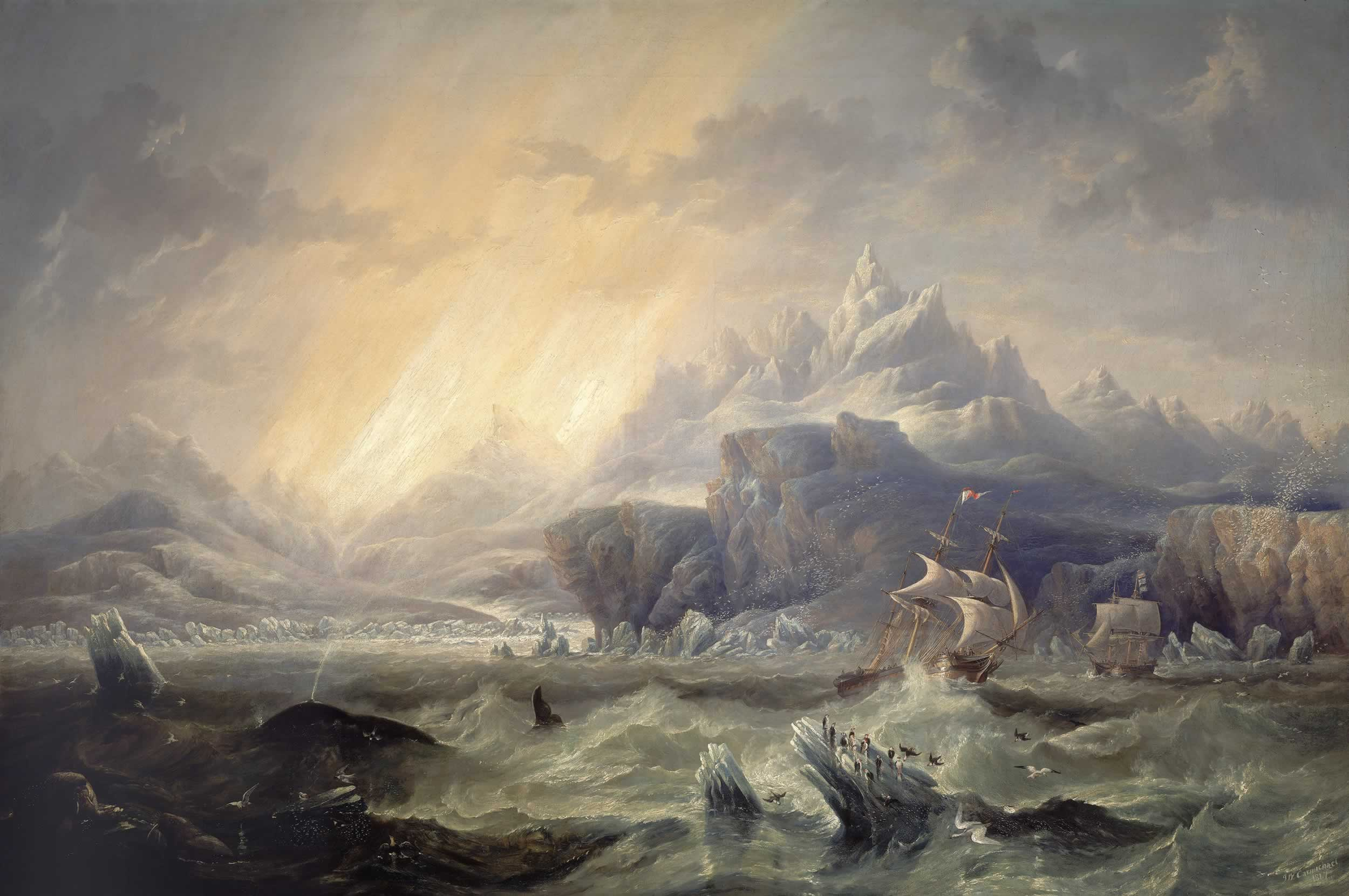
HMS Erebus and HMS Terror in the Antarctic, by James Wilson Carmichael, 1847.

The Ross expedition was a voyage of scientific exploration of the Antarctic in 1839 to 1843, led by James Clark Ross, with two unusually strong warships, HMS Erebus and HMS Terror. It explored what is now called the Ross Sea and discovered the Ross Ice Shelf. On the expedition, Ross discovered the Transantarctic Mountains and the volcanoes Mount Erebus and Mount Terror, named after each ship. The young botanist Joseph Dalton Hooker made his name on the expedition.

The expedition confirmed the existence of the continent of Antarctica, inferred the position of the South Magnetic Pole and made substantial observations of the zoology and botany of the region, resulting in a monograph on the zoology and a series of four detailed monographs by Hooker on the botany, collectively called Flora Antarctica, published in parts between 1843 and 1859. Among the expedition's biological discoveries was the Ross seal, a species confined to the pack ice of Antarctica. The expedition was also the last major voyage of exploration made wholly under sail.

== Expedition ==
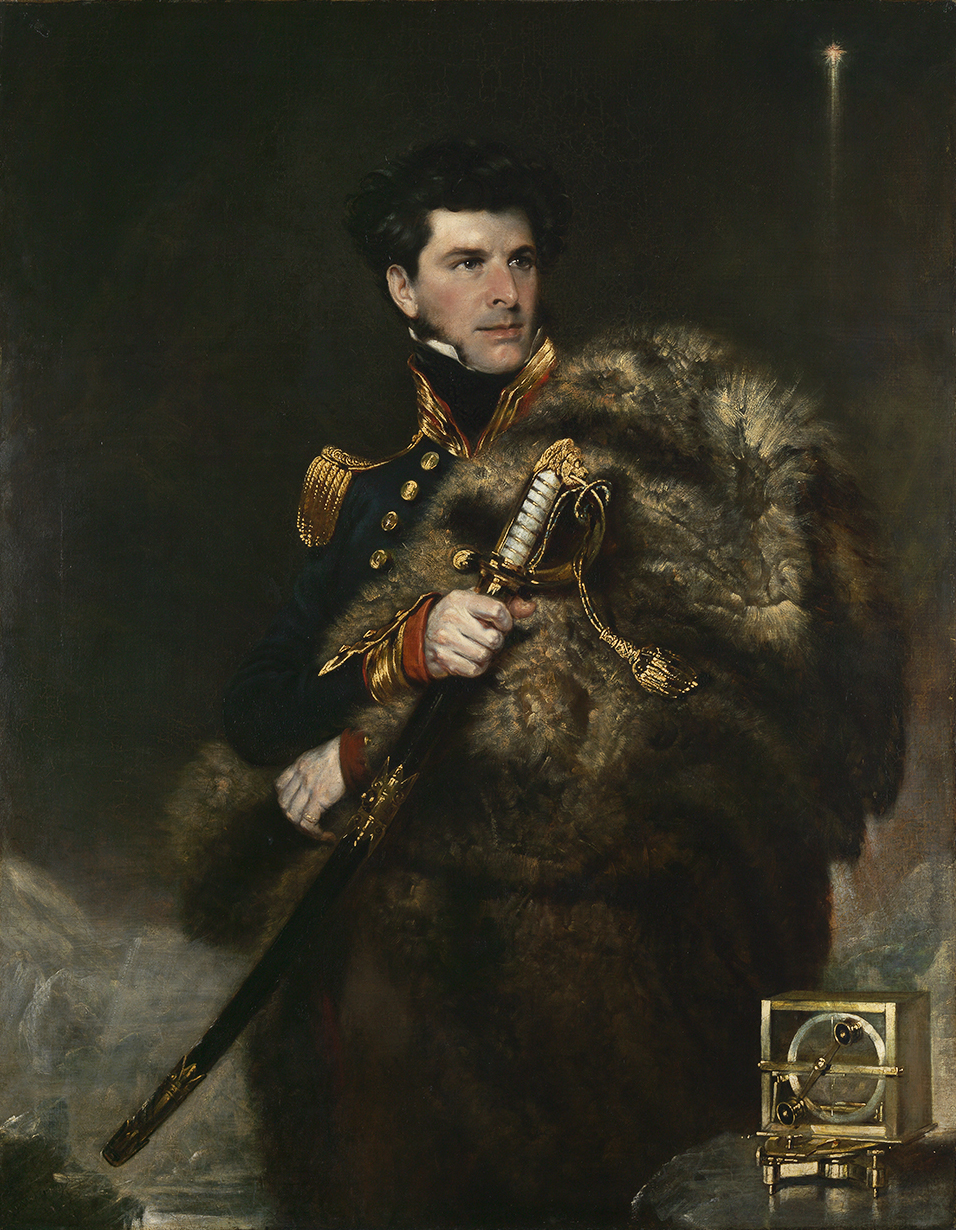
Portrait of Sir James Clark Ross by John R. Wildman. The object lower right is a dip circle.

=== Background ===
In 1838, the British Association for the Advancement of Science (BA) proposed an expedition to carry out magnetic measurements in the Antarctic. Sir James Clark Ross was chosen to lead the expedition after previous experience working on the British Magnetic Survey from 1834 onwards, working with prominent physicists and geologists such as Humphrey Lloyd, Sir Edward Sabine, John Phillips and Robert Were Fox. Ross had made many previous expeditions to the Arctic, including experience as captain.

=== People ===
Ross, a captain of the Royal Navy, commanded HMS Erebus. Its sister ship, HMS Terror, was commanded by Ross' close friend, Captain Francis Crozier.

The botanist Joseph Dalton Hooker, then aged 23 and the youngest person on the expedition, was assistant-surgeon to Robert McCormick, and responsible for collecting zoological and geological specimens. Hooker later became one of England's greatest botanists; he was a close friend of Charles Darwin and became director of the Royal Botanical Gardens, Kew for twenty years. McCormick had been ship's surgeon for the second voyage of HMS Beagle under Captain Robert FitzRoy, along with Darwin as gentleman naturalist.

The second master on Terror was John E. Davis who was responsible for much of the surveying and chart production, as well as producing many illustrations of the voyage. He had been on the Beagle surveying the coasts of Bolivia, Peru and Chile. Another Arctic veteran was Thomas Abernethy, another friend of Ross, who joined the new expedition as a gunner.

=== Ships ===
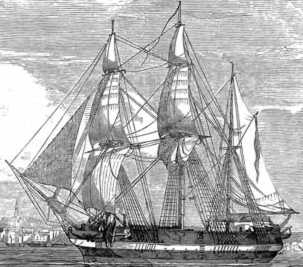
One of the expedition's ships, either HMS Erebus or HMS Terror, from the Illustrated London News, 1845

HMS Erebus and HMS Terror, the ships servicing the Ross expedition, were two unusually strong warships. Both were bomb ships, named and equipped to fire heavy mortar bombs at a high angle over defences, and were accordingly heavily built to withstand the substantial recoil of these three-ton weapons. Their solid construction ideally suited them for use in dangerous sea ice that might crush other ships. The 372-ton Erebus had been armed with two mortars – one 13 in (330 mm) and one 10 in (250 mm) – and ten guns.

=== Voyage ===
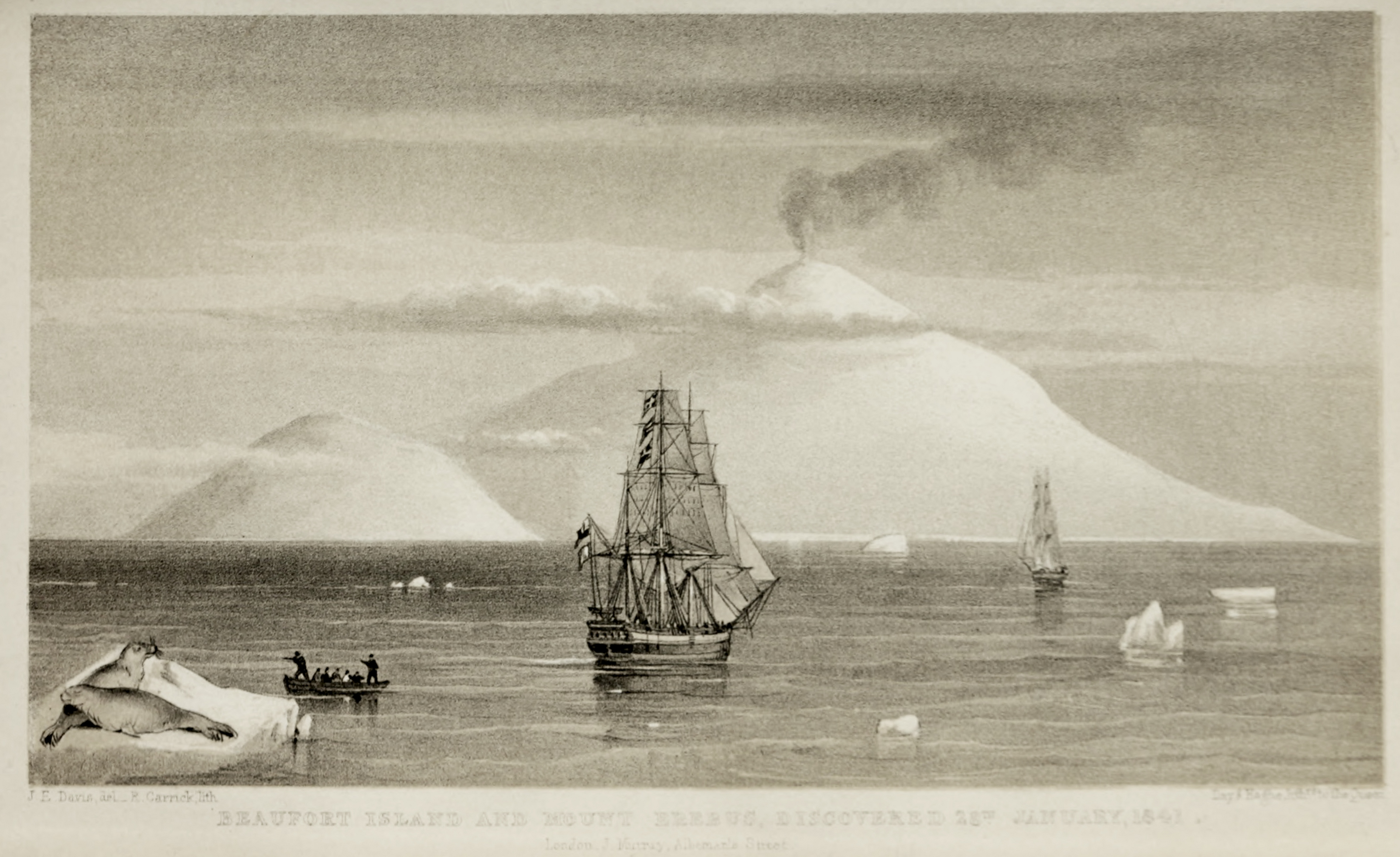
Painting of the expedition in front of Beaufort Island (left) and Mount Erebus, by Terror's second master, John E. Davis, who produced numerous charts and illustrations of the voyage

Map of Ross' 1839-43 Antarctic expedition

In September 1839, Erebus and Terror departed Chatham in Kent, arriving at Tasmania (then known as Van Diemen's Land) in August 1840. On 21 November 1840 they departed for Antarctica. In January 1841, the ships landed on Victoria Land and proceeded to name areas of the landscape after British politicians, scientists and acquaintances. Mount Erebus, on Ross Island, was named after one ship and Mount Terror after the other. McMurdo Bay (now known as McMurdo Sound) was named after Archibald McMurdo, senior lieutenant of Terror.

Reaching latitude 76° south on 28 January 1841, the explorers spied

...a low white line extending from its eastern extreme point as far as the eye could discern... It presented an extraordinary appearance, gradually increasing in height, as we got nearer to it, and proving at length to be a perpendicular cliff of ice, between one hundred and fifty and two hundred feet above the level of the sea, perfectly flat and level at the top, and without any fissures or promontories on its even seaward face.

Ross called this the "Great Ice Barrier", now known as the Ross Ice Shelf, which they were unable to penetrate, although they followed it eastward until the lateness of the season compelled them to return to Tasmania. The following summer, 1841–42, Ross continued to follow the ice shelf eastward. Both ships stayed at Port Louis in the Falkland Islands for the winter, returning in September 1842 to explore the Antarctic Peninsula, where they conducted studies in magnetism, and gathered oceanographic data and collections of botanical and ornithological specimens.

The expedition arrived back in England on 4 September 1843, having confirmed the existence of the southern continent and charted a large part of its coastline. It was the last major voyage of exploration made wholly under sail.

== Discoveries ==
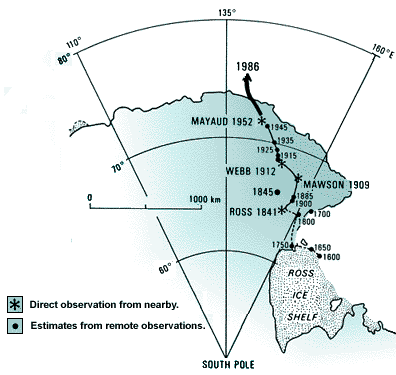
Wandering of South Magnetic Pole from observation, starting with Ross, and prediction

=== Geography ===
Ross discovered the "enormous" Ross Ice Shelf, correctly observing that it was the source of the tabular icebergs seen in the Southern Ocean, and helping to found the science of glaciology. He identified the Transantarctic Mountains and the volcanoes Erebus and Terror, named after his ships.

=== Magnetism ===
The main purpose of the Ross expedition was to find the position of the South Magnetic Pole, by making observations of the Earth's magnetism in the Southern Hemisphere. Ross did not reach the Pole, but did infer its position. The expedition made the first "definitive" charts of magnetic declination, magnetic dip and magnetic intensity, in place of the less accurate charts made by the earlier expeditions of Charles Wilkes and Dumont d'Urville.

=== Zoology ===
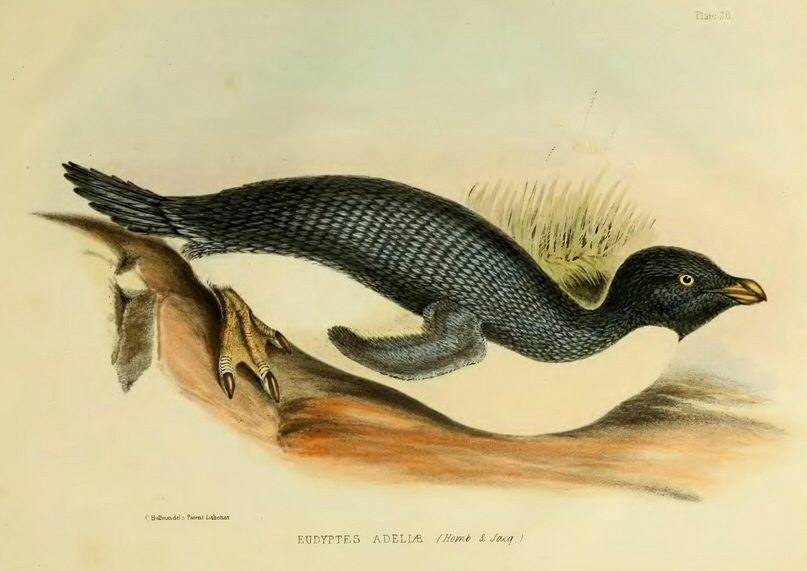
Adélie penguin, from the Ross Expedition to the Antarctic of 1839–1843. The Zoology of the Voyage of HMS Erebus and Terror Vol 1, 1875. Drawn by C. Hillman

The expedition's zoological discoveries included a collection of birds. They were described and illustrated by George Robert Gray and Richard Bowdler Sharpe in The Zoology of the Voyage of HMS Erebus & HMS Terror.

The expedition was the first to describe the Ross seal, which it found in the pack ice, to which the species is confined.

=== Botany ===
The expedition's botanical discoveries were documented in Joseph Dalton Hooker's four-part Flora Antarctica (1843–1859). It totalled six volumes (parts III and IV each being in two volumes), covered about 3000 species, and contained 530 plates figuring in all 1095 of the species described. It was throughout "splendidly" illustrated by Walter Hood Fitch. The parts were:

- Part I Botany of Lord Auckland's Group and Campbell's Island (1844–1845)
- Part II Botany of Fuegia, the Falklands, Kerguelen's Land, Etc. (1845–1847)
- Part III Flora Novae-Zelandiae (1851–1853) (2 volumes)
- Part IV Flora Tasmaniae (1853–1859) (2 volumes)

Hooker gave Charles Darwin a copy of the first part of the Flora; Darwin thanked him, and agreed in November 1845 that the geographical distribution of organisms would be "the key which will unlock the mystery of species".

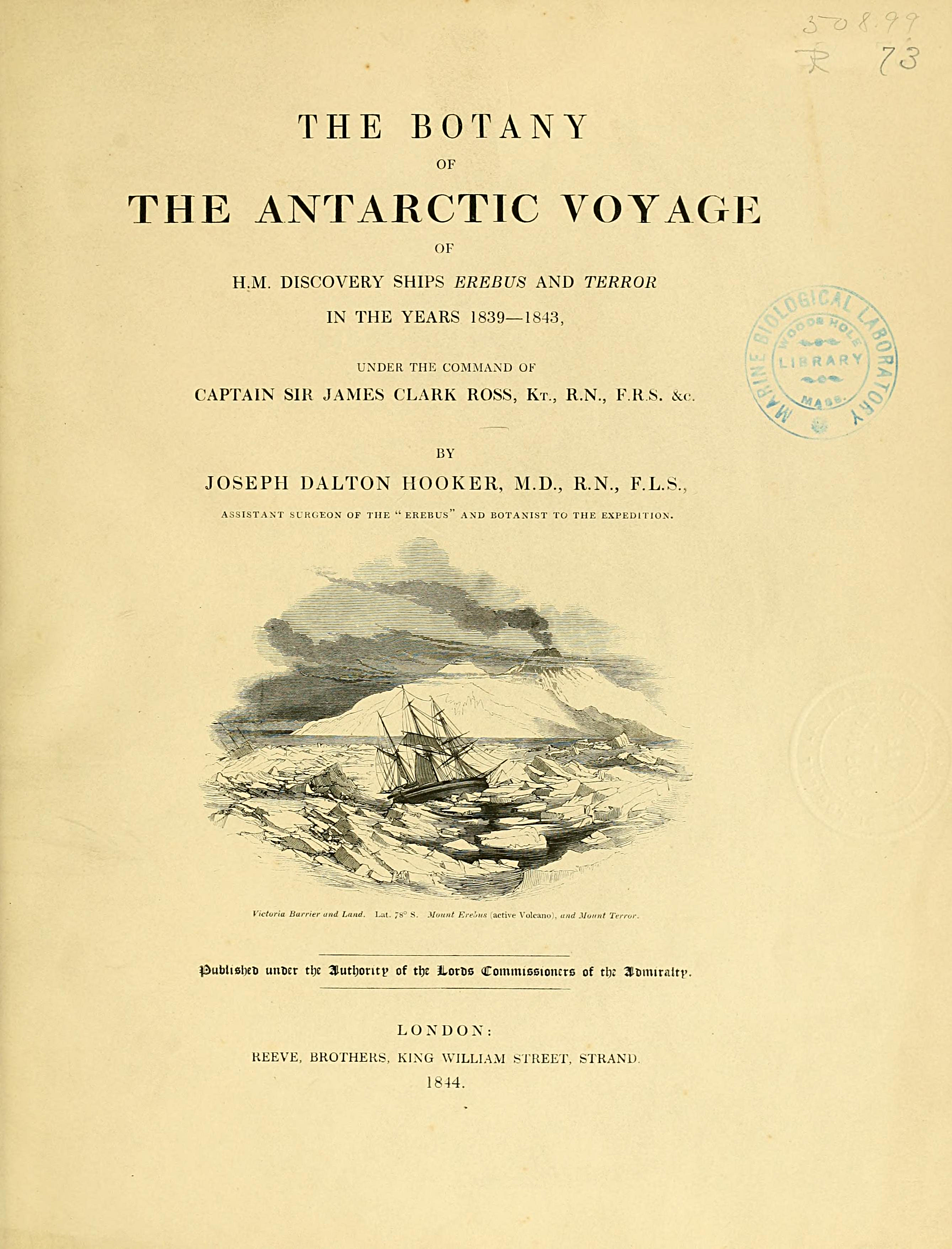
Title page of Flora Antarctica, 1844–1846

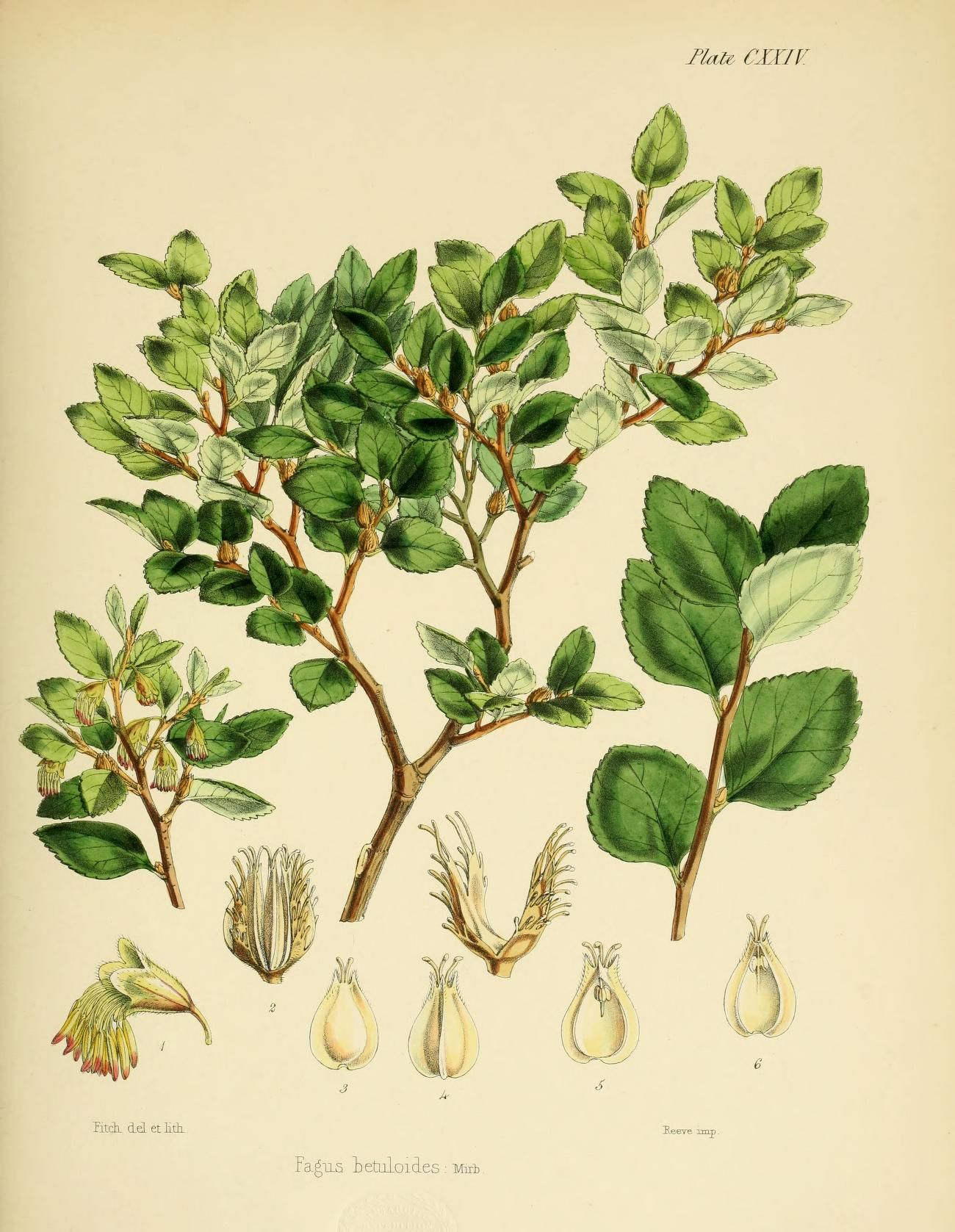
Fagus betuloides (Flora Antarctica, Plate CXXIV)

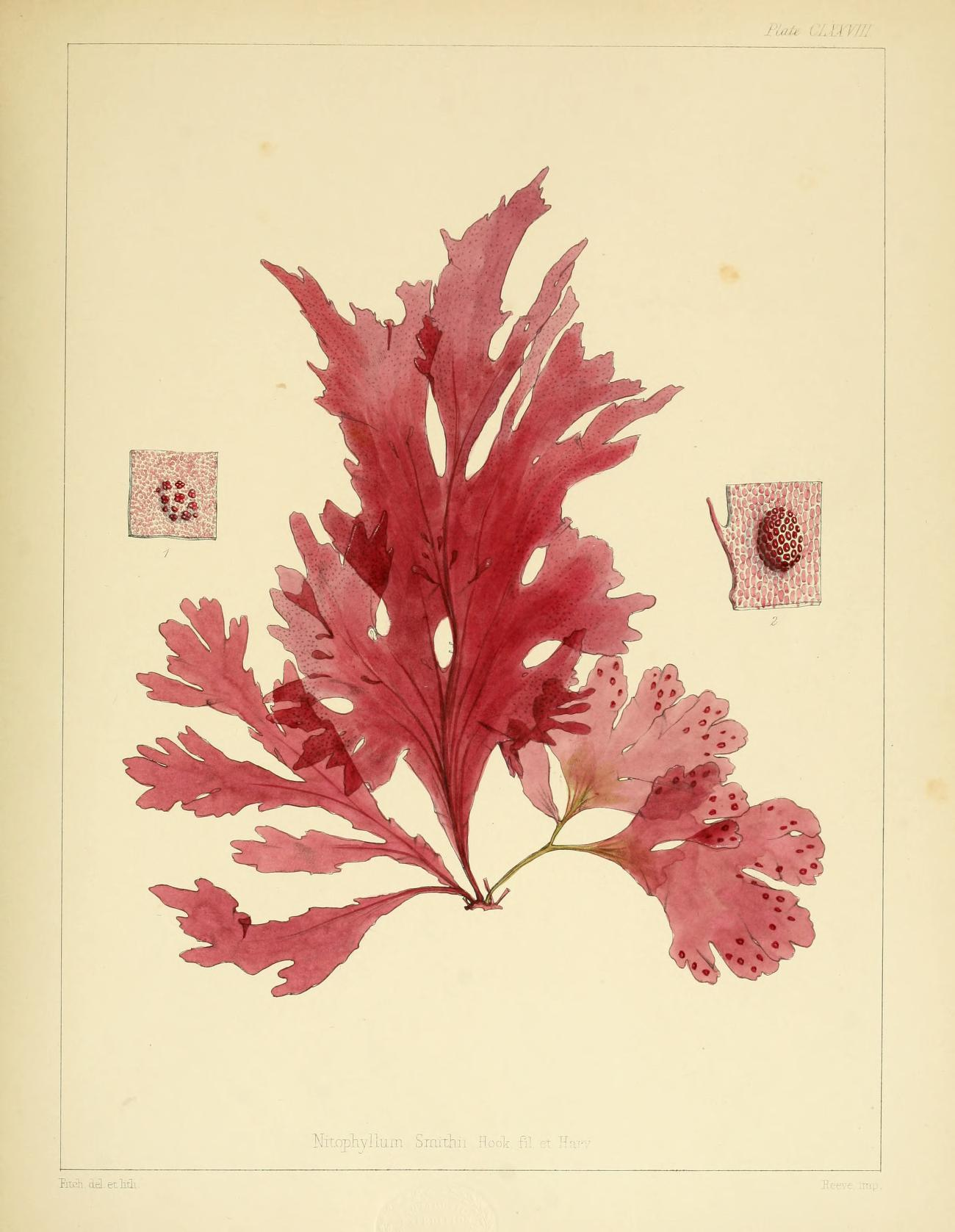
The red alga Nitophyllum smithi

== Influence ==
In 1912, the Norwegian explorer Roald Amundsen wrote of the Ross expedition that "Few people of the present day are capable of rightly appreciating this heroic deed, this brilliant proof of human courage and energy. With two ponderous craft – regular "tubs" according to our ideas – these men sailed right into the heart of the pack [ice], which all previous explorers had regarded as certain death ... These men were heroes – heroes in the highest sense of the word."

Hooker's Flora Antarctica remains important; in 2013 W. H. Walton in his Antarctica: Global Science from a Frozen Continent describes it as "a major reference to this day", encompassing as it does "all the plants he found both in the Antarctic and on the sub-Antarctic islands", surviving better than Ross's deep-sea soundings which were made with "inadequate equipment".
