= Flora Novae-Zelandiae =

1853 book by Joseph Dalton Hooker

- Author: Joseph Dalton Hooker
- Illustrator: Walter Hood Fitch
- Language: English
- Series: Monthly parts
- Subject: Botany
- Publisher: Reeve Brothers
- Publication date: 1851–1853
- Publication place: England

The Flora Novae-Zelandiae is a description of the plants discovered in New Zealand during the Ross expedition written by Joseph Dalton Hooker and published by Reeve Brothers in London between 1853 and 1855. Hooker sailed on HMS Erebus as assistant surgeon. It was the third in a series of four Floras in the Flora Antarctica, the others being the Botany of Lord Auckland's Group and Campbell's Island (1843–45), the Botany of Fuegia, the Falklands, Kerguelen's Land, Etc. (1845–1847), and the Flora Tasmaniae (1853–1859). They were "splendidly" illustrated by Walter Hood Fitch.

The larger part of the plant specimens collected during the Ross expedition are now part of the Kew Herbarium.

== Context ==
The British government fitted out an expedition led by James Clark Ross to investigate magnetism and marine geography in high southern latitudes, which sailed with two ships, HMS Terror and HMS Erebus on 29 September 1839 from Chatham.

The ships arrived, after several stops, at the Cape of Good Hope on 4 April 1840. On 21 April the giant kelp Macrocystis pyrifera was found off Marion Island, but no landfall could be made there or on the Crozet Islands due to the harsh winds. On 12 May the ships anchored at Christmas Harbour for two and a half months, during which all the plant species previously encountered by James Cook on the Kerguelen Islands were collected. On 16 August they reached the River Derwent, remaining in Tasmania until 12 November. A week later the flotilla stopped at Lord Auckland's Islands and Campbell's Island for the spring months.

Large floating forests of Macrocystis and Durvillaea were found until the ships ran into icebergs at latitude 61° S. Pack-ice was met at 68° S and longitude 175°. During this part of the voyage Victoria Land, Mount Erebus and Mount Terror were discovered. After returning to Tasmania for three months, the flotilla went via Sydney to the Bay of Islands, and stayed for three months in New Zealand to collect plants there. After visiting other islands, the ships returned to the Cape of Good Hope on 4 April 1843. At the end of the journey specimens of some fifteen hundred plant species had been collected and preserved.

== Book ==
Flora Novae-Zelandiae was published between 1851 and 1853.

- Volume 1 Phanerogams (355 pages, 730 species, 70 plates, 83 species figured)
- Volume 2 Cryptogams (378 pages, 1037 species, 60 plates, 230 species figured)

The book begins with an introductory essay which begins by summarizing the history of botanical research of the islands. Hooker singles out the work of Sir Joseph Banks and Daniel Solander on Captain Cook's first voyage in 1769, also mentioning Cook's second voyage and, 20 years later, the explorations of the French survey ship Coquille and the plant collector D'Urville. Hooker notes that the fungi of the islands remained largely unknown. The next chapter of the essay, on plant biogeography and evolution, is entitled "On the limits of species; their dispersion and variation"; Hooker discusses how plant species may have originated, and notes how much more they vary than was often supposed. The third chapter of the essay considers the "affinities" (relationships) of the New Zealand flora to other floras.

The flora proper begins with a short introduction explaining the book's approach; as with the other volumes, the bulk of the text is a systematic account of the families and species found by the expedition.

== Impact ==
David Frodin commented in 2001 that J. D. Hooker was the first to study the sub-Antarctic Campbell Island and the Auckland group, and that the Flora "largely completed" the "primary phase of botanical survey in the [New Zealand] region".
