= Flora Antarctica =

Scientific work by Joseph Dalton Hooker

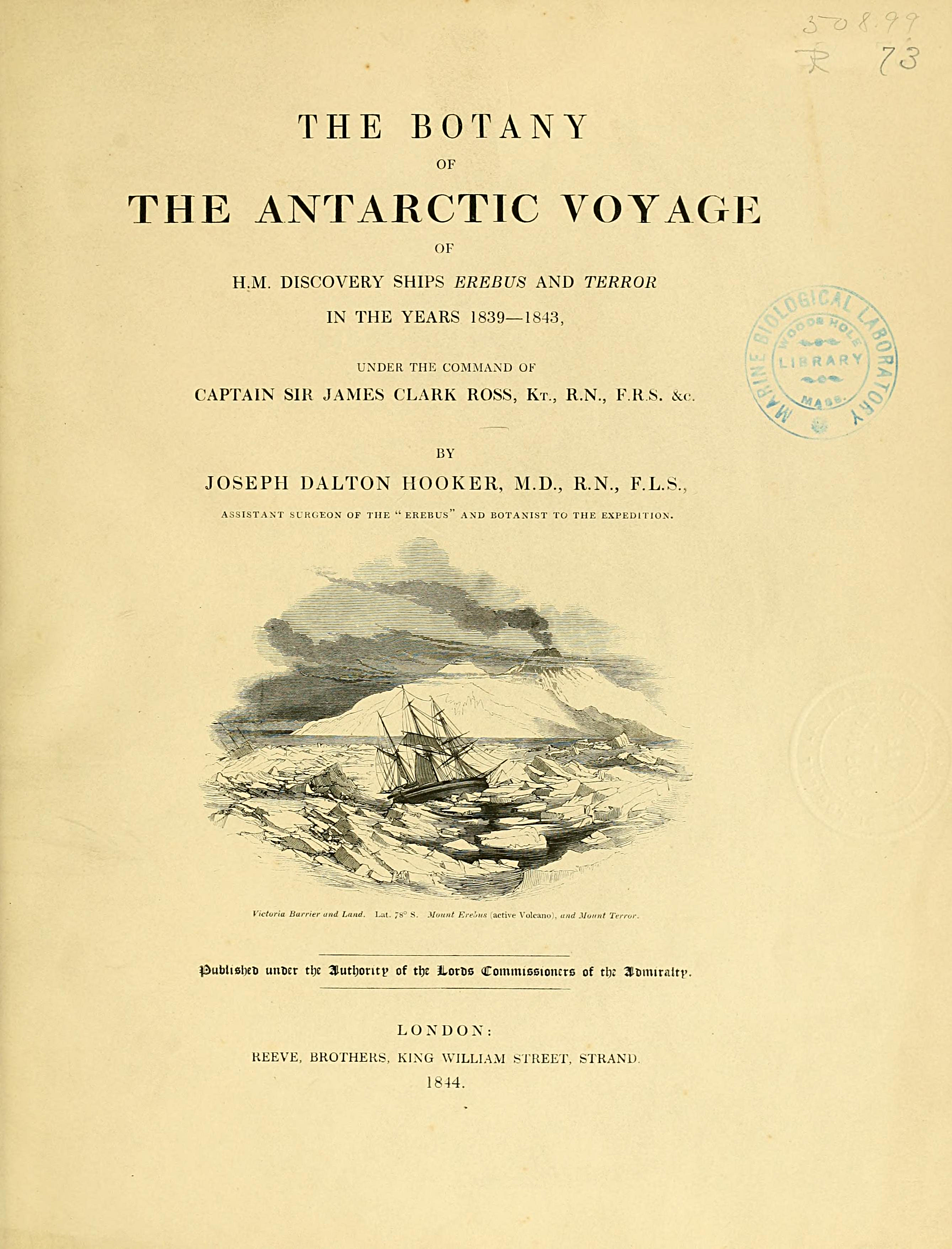
- Title page with an etching of Victoria Barrier with Mount Erebus and Mount Terror; one of the expedition's ships is shown temporarily trapped in sea ice.
- Author: Joseph Dalton Hooker
- Illustrator: Walter Hood Fitch
- Language: English
- Series: Monthly parts
- Subject: Botany
- Publisher: Reeve Brothers
- Publication date: 1844–1859
- Publication place: United Kingdom
- Text: Flora Antarctica at Wikisource

The Flora Antarctica, or formally and correctly The Botany of the Antarctic Voyage of H.M. Discovery Ships Erebus and Terror in the years 1839–1843, under the Command of Captain Sir James Clark Ross, is a description of the many plants discovered on the Ross expedition, which visited islands off the coast of the Antarctic continent, with a summary of the expedition itself, written by the British botanist Joseph Dalton Hooker and published in parts between 1844 and 1859 by Reeve Brothers in London. Hooker sailed on HMS Erebus as assistant surgeon.

The botanical findings of the Ross expedition were published in four parts, the last two in two volumes each, making six volumes in all:

- Part I Botany of Lord Auckland's Group and Campbell's Island (1844–1845)
- Part II Botany of Fuegia, the Falklands, Kerguelen's Land, Etc. (1845–1847)
- Part III Flora Novae-Zelandiae (1851–1853) (2 volumes)
- Part IV Flora Tasmaniae (1853–1859) (2 volumes)

All were "splendidly" illustrated by Walter Hood Fitch, who prepared thousands of detailed botanical figures on 530 colour plates. The greater part of the plant specimens collected during this expedition are now part of London's Kew Herbarium.

The Flora of Tasmania contains an introductory essay on biogeography written from a Darwinian point of view, making the book the first case study for the theory of evolution by natural selection. This has been seen as the foundation of evolutionary biogeography. Hooker gave Darwin a copy of the work, which proposed that plant groups on different landmasses had common ancestors, spreading via long-vanished land bridges. Darwin doubted the explanation but agreed that geographical distribution would be vital to understanding the origin of species. In the 21st century the book is still treated as a major reference work.

== Context ==
=== Ross and earlier expeditions ===
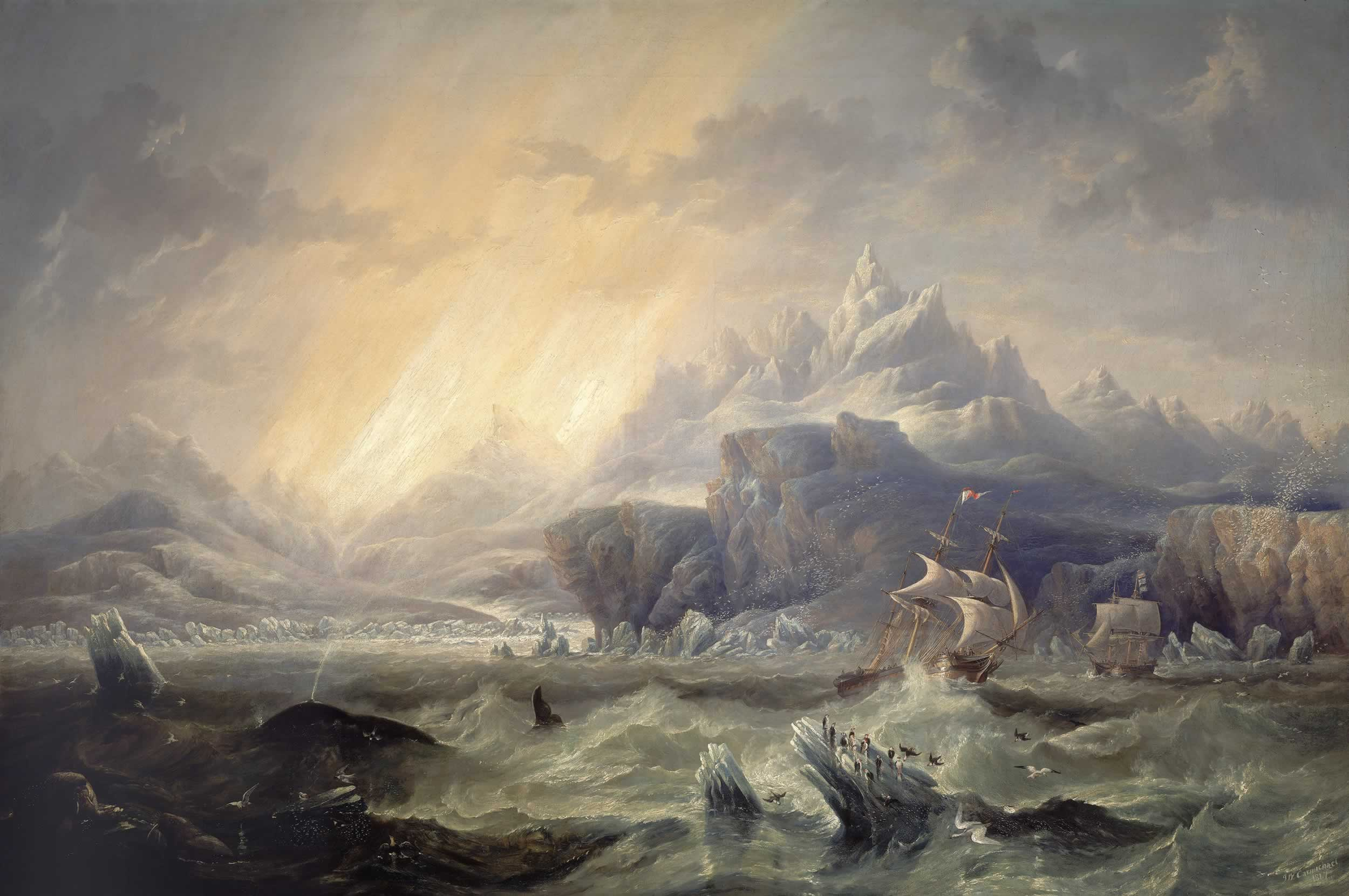
The Ross expedition sailed with two ships, HMS Erebus and HMS Terror, depicted here in the Antarctic by James Wilson Carmichael, 1847.

The British government fitted out an expedition led by the explorer and naval officer James Clark Ross to investigate magnetism and marine geography in high southern latitudes, which sailed with two ships, HMS Terror and HMS Erebus on 29 September 1839 from Chatham.

The ships docked at Madeira, Tenerife, the Cape Verde archipelago, Saint Peter and Saint Paul Archipelago, Trinidad and arrived at the Cape of Good Hope on 4 April 1840. On 21 April the giant kelp Macrocystis pyrifera was seen off Marion Island, but no landfall could be made there or on the Crozet Islands due to the harsh winds. On 12 May the ships anchored at Christmas Harbour for two and a half months, during which all plants previously encountered by James Cook on the Kerguelen Islands were collected. On 20 July they sailed again to arrive on 16 August at the River Derwent, to remain in Tasmania until 12 November. A week later the flotilla stopped at Lord Auckland's Islands and Campbell's Island for the spring months.

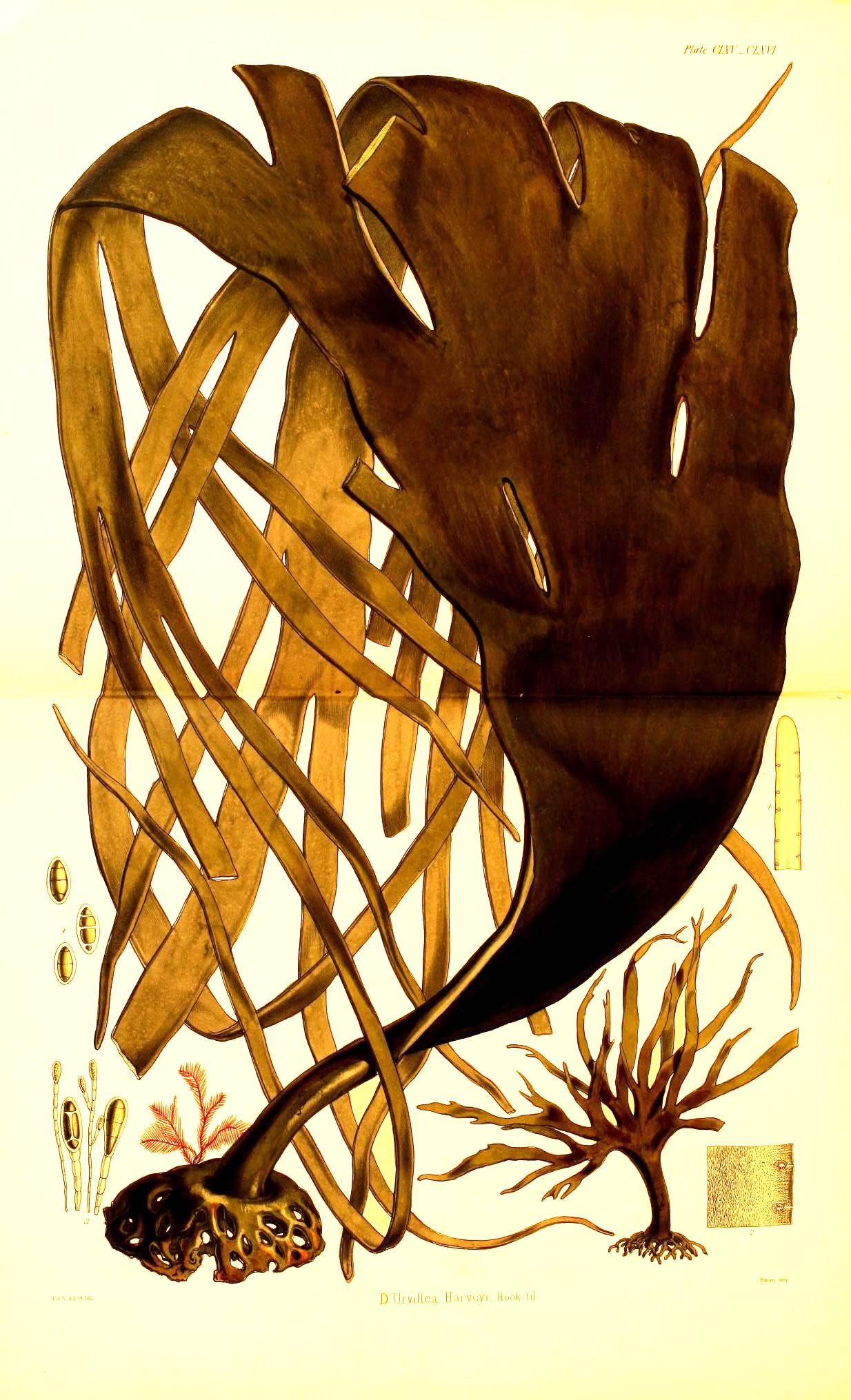
The ships sailed through forests of Durvillea harveyi (now Durvillea antarctica)

Large floating forests of Macrocystis and Durvillaea were found until the ships ran into the icebergs at latitude 61° S. Pack-ice was met at 68° S and longitude 175°. During this part of the voyage Victoria Land, Mount Erebus and Mount Terror were discovered. After returning to Tasmania for three months, the flotilla went via Sydney to the Bay of Islands, and stayed for three months in New Zealand to collect plants.

From 6 April 1842 a long stay in the Falklands began, where the flora was investigated to supplement the work of the French explorer Admiral Jules Dumont d'Urville, who had sailed to the Antarctic and the Pacific between 1837 and 1840, and of the crew of the Uranie, who had visited the South Atlantic and the South Pacific between 1817 and 1820. In the Flora Atlantica, Hooker praises the work of the English botanist Sir Joseph Banks and his Swedish assistant, Daniel Solander, on Captain Cook's first voyage in 1769. Hooker also mentions Cook's second voyage and the explorations of the French survey ship Coquille, on which D'Urville had served as a young officer. When visiting the Hermite Islands, seedlings of the deciduous Nothofagus antarctica and the evergreen Nothofagus betuloides were collected from this southernmost location of any tree. These were planted on the Falklands, and some were later brought to Kew. On Cockburn's Island twenty cryptogam species were found. The ships returned to the Cape of Good Hope on 4 April 1843. At the end of the journey specimens of some fifteen hundred plant species had been collected and preserved.

Few earlier botanical descriptions of the region had been written, and little or no plant collecting had been attempted other than on the coasts before 1820. The first flora for New Zealand was Achille Richard's 1832 Essai d'une flore de la Nouvelle-Zélande, based on d'Urville's work and such earlier data as existed. This was followed by Allan Cunningham's 1839 Florae insularum Novae-Zelandiae praecursor.

=== Joseph Dalton Hooker ===
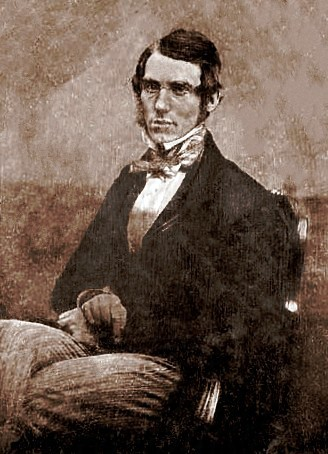
The work's author, Joseph Dalton Hooker, c. 1852

Joseph Dalton Hooker was a British botanist. His father, William Jackson Hooker, was the director of the Royal Botanic Gardens, Kew, the United Kingdom's centre for the study of plant species. The voyage to the Antarctic on the Ross expedition, when he was 23 years old, was his first; formally, he sailed on HMS Erebus as assistant surgeon. Charles Darwin wrote to Hooker in November 1843, urging him to write "some general sketch of the Flora" of the Antarctic, complete with "comparative remarks on the species allied to the European species". Hooker subsequently made voyages to regions around the world including the Himalayas and India in 1847–1851, Palestine in 1860, Morocco in 1871, and the Western United States in 1877, collecting plants and writing monographs on his findings in each case. These helped him to build a high scientific reputation, and in 1855 he became Assistant-Director of the Royal Botanic Gardens, Kew; he became full Director in 1865, remaining so for 20 years.

=== Walter Hood Fitch ===
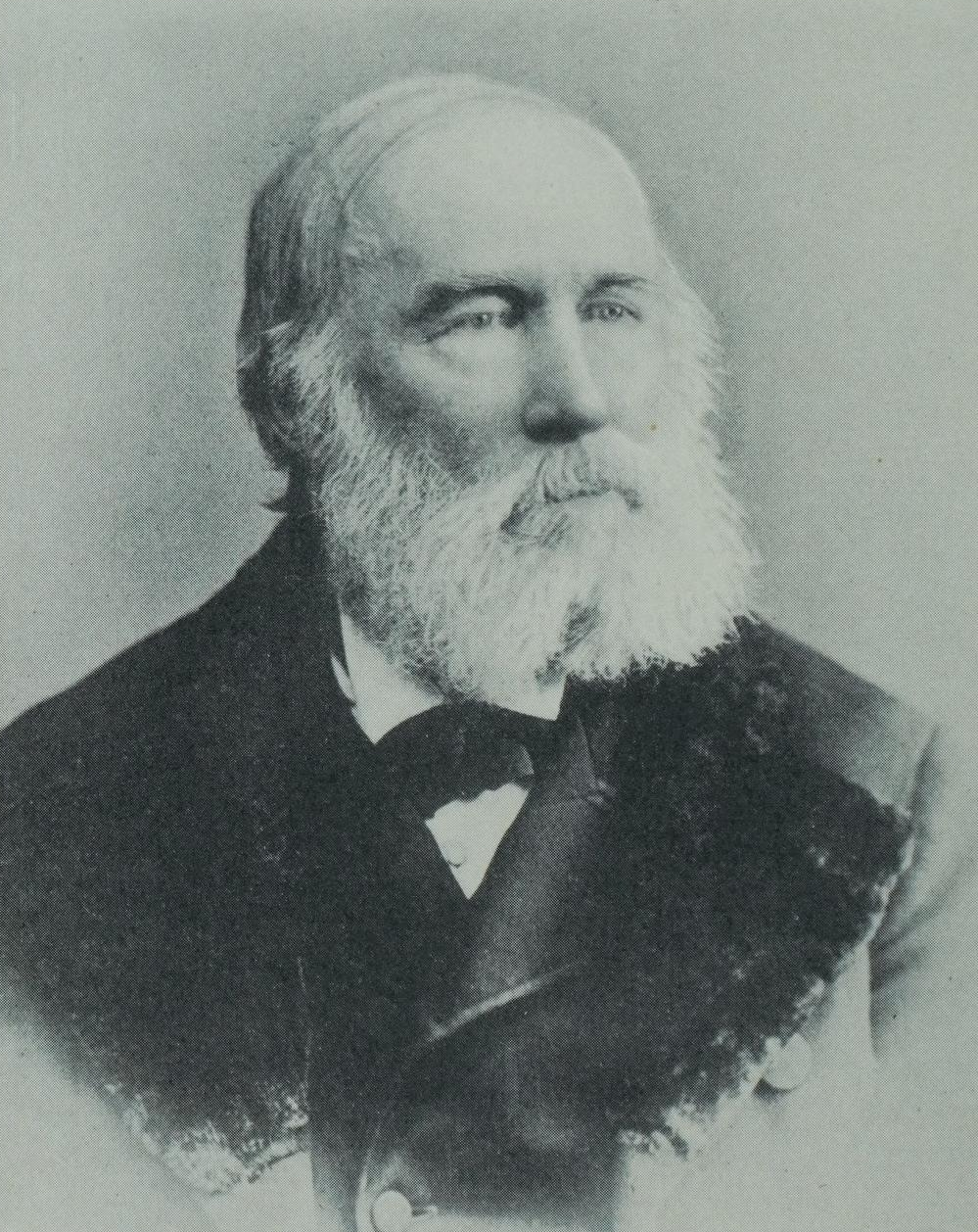
The work's illustrator, Walter Hood Fitch, c. 1890

Hooker was ably assisted by the illustrator Walter Hood Fitch, who "splendidly" prepared the many colour illustrations required for the Flora. William Hooker had encouraged Fitch to move into botanical illustration; from 1834, Fitch was the sole artist for Curtis's Botanical Magazine. In 1841, when William Hooker became Director at Kew, Fitch became Kew's sole artist for all its publications, making the chromolithographs by drawing directly onto the lithographic stone; Hooker paid him personally.

== Monograph ==
=== Publication history ===
The four parts of the Flora Antarctica total 6 volumes, describe about 3000 species, and contain 530 plates which depict 1095 of the species. They were published by Reeve Brothers in London between 1844 and 1849. The work was reprinted (in English) by the German publisher J. Cramer in Weinheim in 1963.

=== Approach ===
The work is prefaced with a "Summary of the Voyage". Each volume begins with a brief general overview of the flora of its region. The body of the work consists of a systematic list of the plant families found in that region, such as Ranunculaceae. Each such family receives a brief overall description, followed by a brief account of the family's habitat in the region. The description of each family and species is in Latin, while the discussion is in English. Each species is illustrated in the colour plates, the details indexed at the end of the text on that species. Thus for instance Ranunculus pinguis is described as acaulis, carnosus, pilosus, ... ('unstalked, fleshy, hairy, ...'); the a and β varieties living in Lord Auckland's group of islands, in "boggy places on the hills, alt. 1000 feet...". The Latin is tersely botanical, confining itself to anatomical features; the English discussion is more wide-ranging, with comments such as "A very handsome species, and quite distinct from any with which I am acquainted." The flowering plants are described first, followed by the "lower plants" and ending with the lichens.

=== Contents ===
==== Botany of Lord Auckland's Group and Campbell's Island ====
Part I, published between 1844 and 1845, covers the Flora of Lord Auckland and Campbell's Islands. It has 208 pages, 370 species, 80 plates and a map, and illustrates 150 species. According to Hooker, the flora of the islands south of Tasmania and New Zealand is related to that of New Zealand and bears no likeness to that of Australia. On the Auckland Islands wood grows near the sea and consists of the tree Metrosideros umbellata intermixed with woody Dracophyllum, Coprosma, Hebe (assigned to Veronica by Hooker) and Panax. These are undergrown by many ferns. Higher up grow alpines. On the Campbell Islands brushwood is limited to narrow bays which are relatively sheltered. These islands are steeper and rocky and have bear less vegetation, primarily grasses.

Hooker was the first to study the sub-Antarctic Campbell Island and the Auckland group.

==== Botany of Fuegia, the Falklands, Kerguelen's Land, Etc. ====
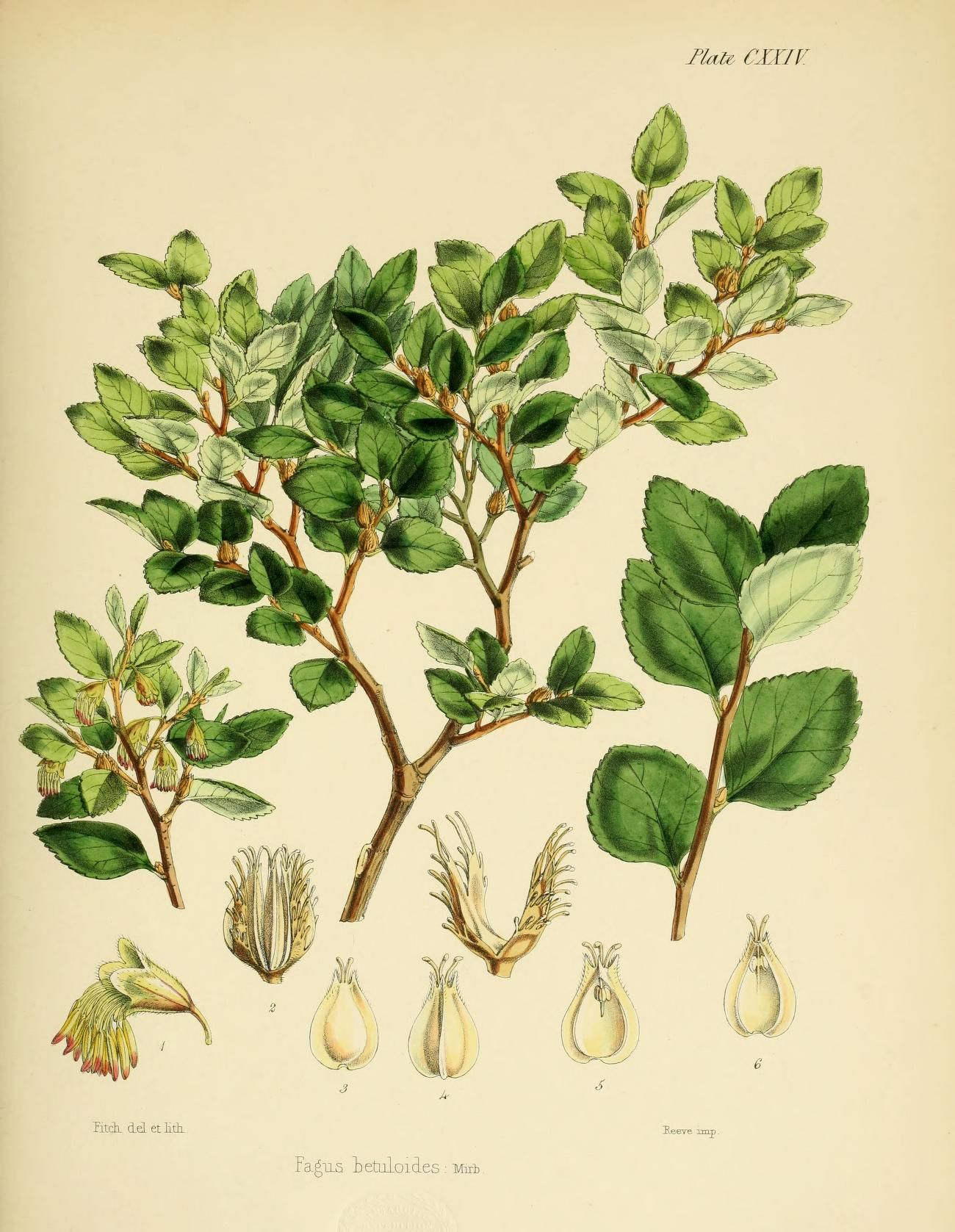
The expedition collected seedlings of Nothofagus betuloides from the Hermite Islands, the southernmost location of any tree.

Part II, published between 1845 and 1847, covers the Botany of Fuegia, the Falklands, Kerguelen's Land, Etc. It has 366 pages, 1000 species, 120 plates, and illustrates 220 species.

According to Hooker, the flora of New Zealand's Antarctic islands is so different from that of the remainder of the territories visited during the voyage, that it merits a separate description. An exemplary difference is the dominance of Asteraceae in New Zealand's islands, and absence of representatives of the Rubiaceae, while the reverse is true for those two plant families on the other Antarctic archipelagos. So the Flora Antarctica describes in its second part the plants of Tierra del Fuego and the south-western coast of Patagonia, the Falkland Islands, Palmer's Land, South Shetlands, South Georgia, Tristan da Cunha, and Kerguelen's Land.

==== Flora Novae-Zelandiae ====
Part III, the Botany of New Zealand or Flora Nova-Zelandiae, was published in two volumes between 1851 and 1853.

- Volume 1 Phanerogams (355 pages, 730 species, 70 plates, 83 species depicted)
- Volume 2 Cryptogams (378 pages, 1037 species, 60 plates, 230 species depicted)

The book has an introductory essay which begins by summarizing the history of botanical research of the islands. Hooker singles out the work of Sir Joseph Banks and Daniel Solander on Captain Cook's first voyage in 1769, also mentioning Cook's second voyage and, 20 years later, the explorations of the French survey ship Coquille and the plant collector D'Urville. Hooker notes that the fungi of the islands remained largely unknown. The next chapter of the essay, on plant biogeography and evolution, is entitled "On the limits of species; their dispersion and variation"; Hooker discusses how plant species may have originated, and notes how much more they vary than was often supposed. The third chapter of the essay considers the "affinities" (relationships) of the New Zealand flora to other floras. The flora proper begins with a short introduction explaining the book's approach; as with the other volumes, the bulk of the text is a systematic account of the families and species found by the expedition.

The Flora "largely completed" the "primary phase of botanical survey in the [New Zealand] region".

==== Flora Tasmaniae ====
Part IV, the Botany of Tasmania or Flora Tasmaniae was published in two volumes between 1853 and 1859.

- Volume 1 Dicotyledones (550 pages, 758 species, 100 plates, 138 species depicted)
- Volume 2 Monocotyledones and Acotyledones (422 pages, 1445 species, 100 plates, 274 species depicted)

Hooker dedicated this Part to the local Tasmanian naturalists Ronald Campbell Gunn and William Archer, noting that "This Flora of Tasmania .. owes so much to their indefatigable exertions". Although the book is sometimes stated to have been published in 1859, the dedication is dated January 1860. It made use of plants collected by the local naturalist Robert Lawrence as well as Gunn and Archer.

The book begins with an "Introductory Essay" on biogeography. It is followed by a "Key to the Natural Orders of Tasmanian Flowering Plants" and a more detailed key to the genera. The Flora proper begins with the first order, the Ranunculaceae.

Flora Tasmaniae was "the first published case study supporting Charles Darwin’s theory of natural selection". It contained a "milestone essay on biogeography", "one of the first major public endorsements of the theory [of evolution by natural selection]". Hooker gradually changed his mind on evolution as he wrote up his findings from the Ross expedition. While he asserted that "my own views on the subjects of the variability of existing species" remain "unaltered from those which I maintained in the 'Flora of New Zealand'", the Flora Tasmaniae is written from a Darwinian perspective that effectively assumes natural selection, or as Hooker named it, the "variation" theory, to be correct.

== Gallery ==
A few of the 530 plates prepared by Walter Hood Fitch

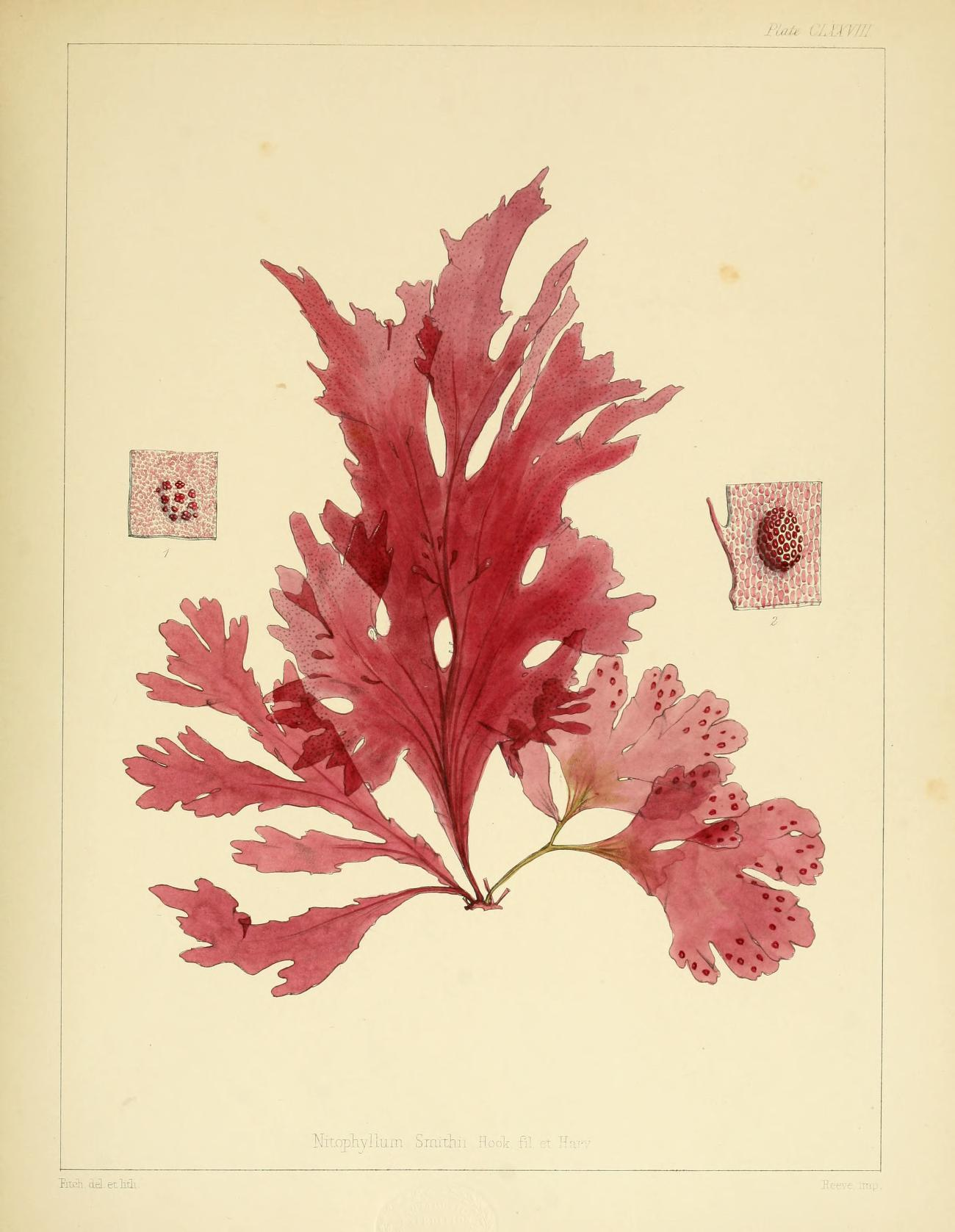
Nitophyllum smithi

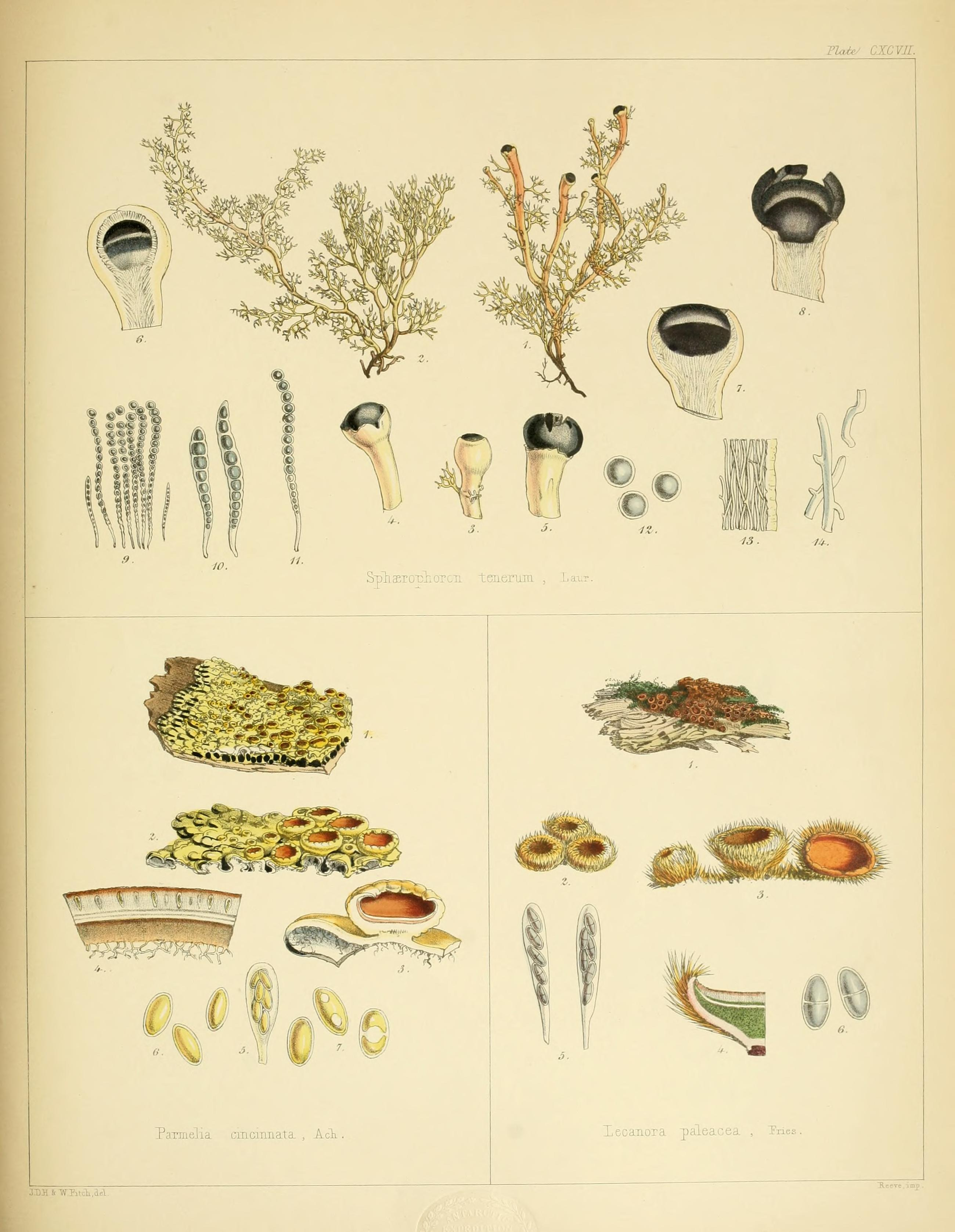
The lichens Sphaerophoron tenerum, Parmelia cincinnata, and Lecanora palaecea

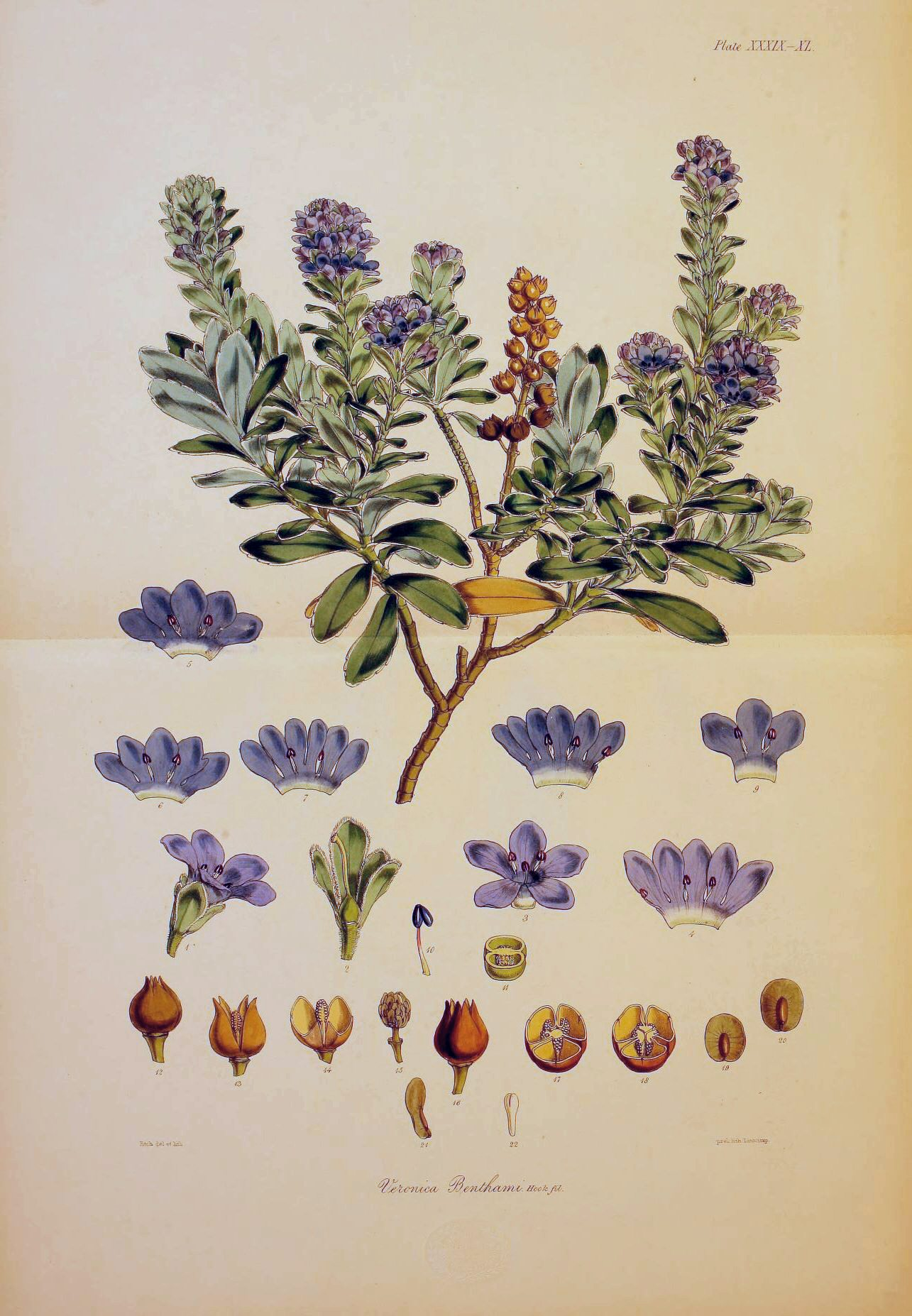
Veronica benthami

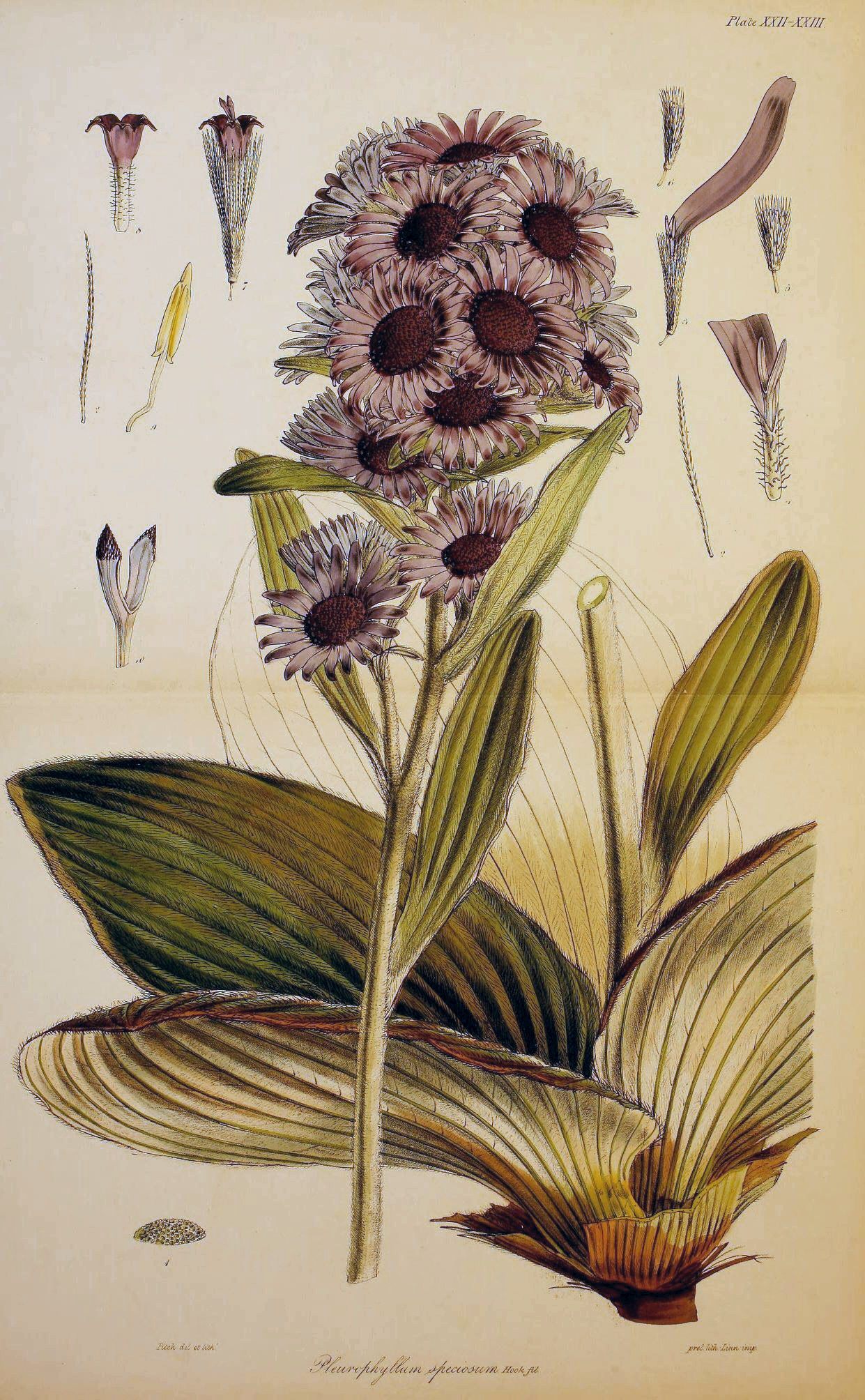
Pleurophyllum speciosum

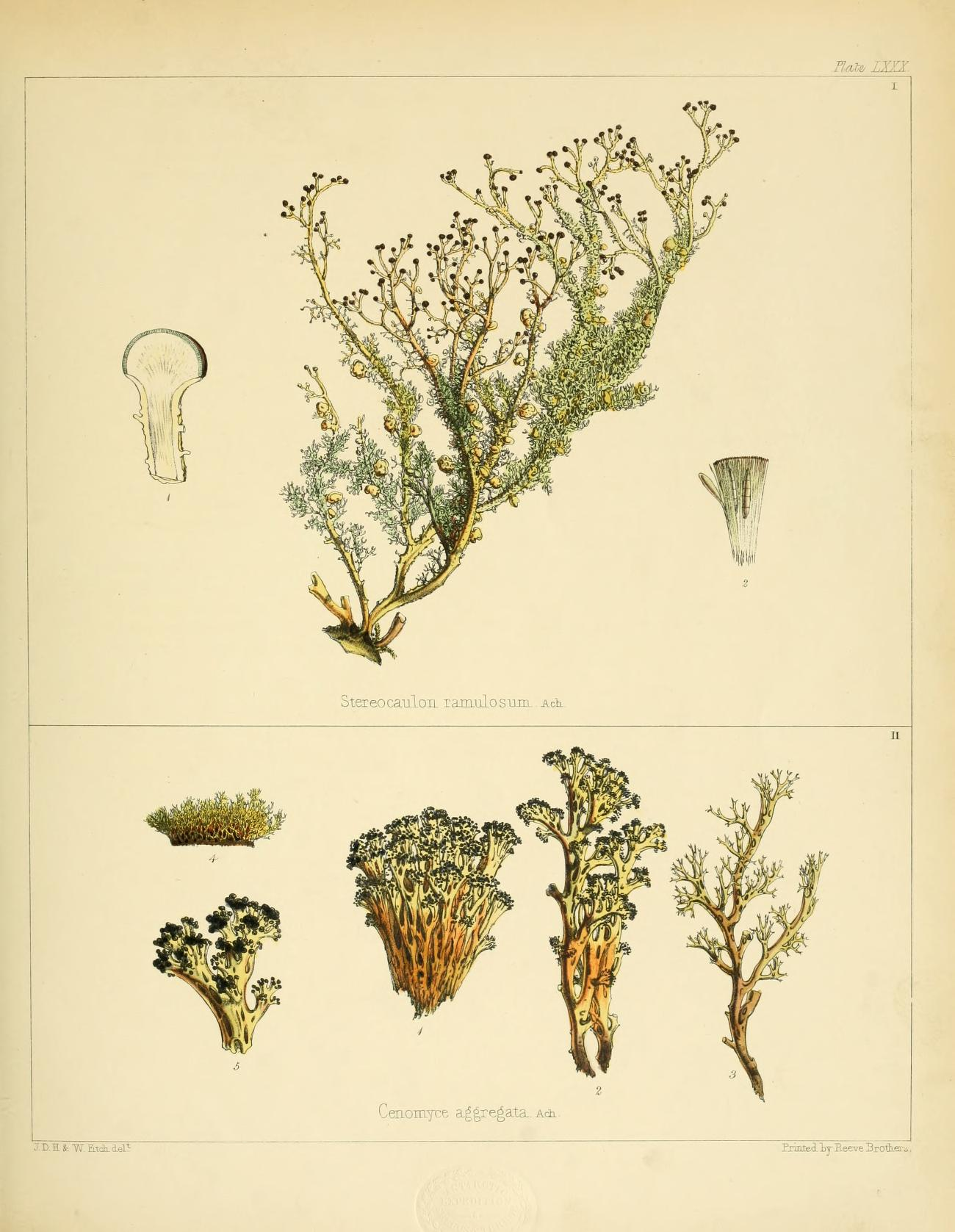
Stereocaulon ramulosum and Cenomyce aggregata

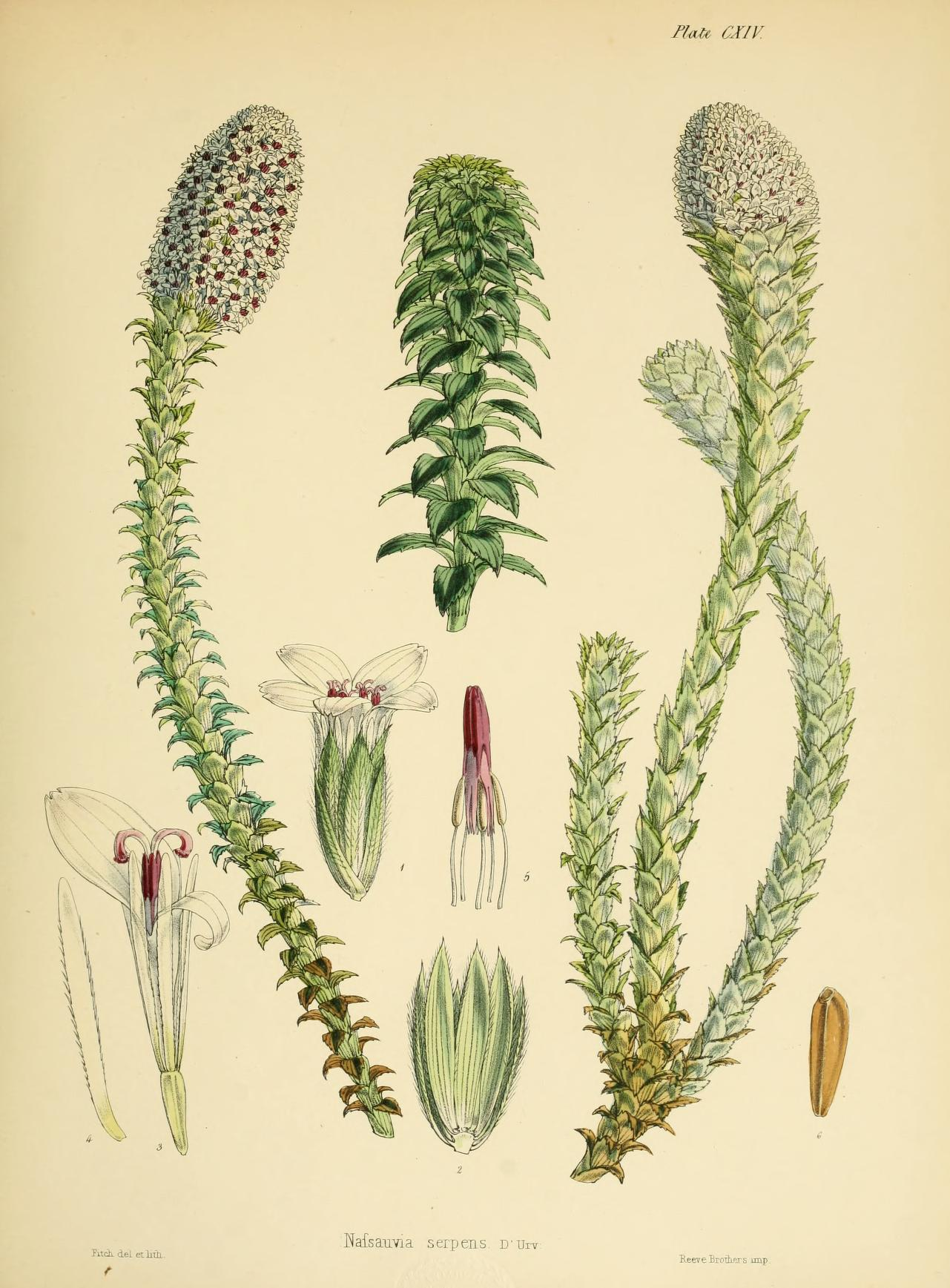
Nafsauvia serpens

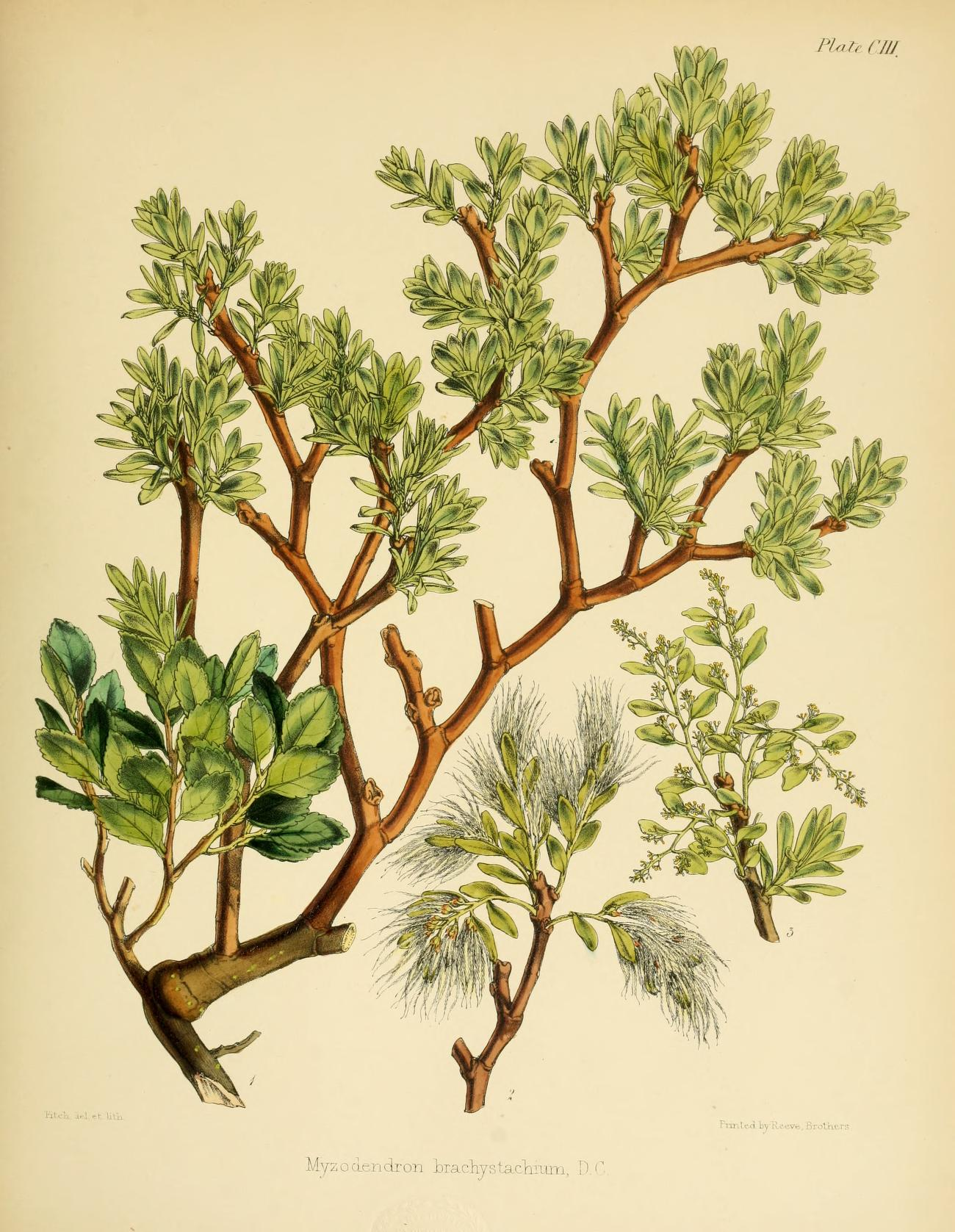
Myzodendron brachystachum

== Reception ==
=== Contemporary ===
Hooker wrote to Darwin in 1845 that the floras of Australia, New Zealand, and Southern South America had common ancestry, and that the plants had perhaps spread across long-vanished land bridges.

The American botanist Asa Gray welcomed the publication of the first two parts of the Flora, describing it as an "elaborate and highly beautiful work,—second in importance and in perfection of illustration, to no other Flora which has appeared in our time".

The work's author, Hooker, gave Charles Darwin a copy of (a draft of) the Flora; Darwin thanked him, and agreed in November 1845 that the geographical distribution of organisms would be "the key which will unlock the mystery of species". To explain the presence of plant groups on the widely-separated landmasses of Australia, New Zealand, and southern South America, Hooker proposed that the groups indeed had common ancestors, and that the plants had spread across now-vanished land bridges. Darwin was sceptical of the explanation, preferring the hypothesis of long-distance seed dispersal. For this work, Hooker has been described as "the real founder of causal historical biogeography".

In 1868, the botanist Robert Oliver Cunningham described the Flora as "invaluable" for his study of the plants of "Fuegia" from the survey ship HMS Nassau.

=== Modern ===
Flora Antarctica remains important, and continues to be cited in modern botanical research. For example, in 2013 W. H. Walton in his Antarctica: Global Science from a Frozen Continent describes it as "a major reference to this day", encompassing as it does "all the plants he found both in the Antarctic and on the sub-Antarctic islands", surviving better than Ross's deep-sea soundings which were made with "inadequate equipment".

David Senchina notes that Hooker was the first botanist to set foot on Antarctica, in 1840; the first sighting of a plant on the continent was only a few years earlier, namely A. Young's observation of Deschampsia antarctica (Antarctic hair grass) in 1819, from HMS Andromache, and the first plant specimen from an Antarctic island had been collected by the American James Eights only in 1830. Senchina calls Hooker's work "monumental", and notes that it covers ecology, with discussion of rocks as sources of heat for plants, and wind as a means of dispersing seeds and spores, as well as "standard plant collection, description, and classification". He concludes that Hooker, in the book and in discussion with Darwin, initiated the study of Antarctic plant geography and ecology.
