= Ranunculus crassipes =

Scientific classification
- Kingdom: Plantae
- Clade: Tracheophytes
- Clade: Angiosperms
- Clade: Eudicots
- Order: Ranunculales
- Family: Ranunculaceae
- Genus: Ranunculus
- Species: R. crassipes

Binomial name
- Ranunculus crassipes Hook.f.

Species of flowering plant

Ranunculus crassipes is a small flowering plant in the buttercup or crowfoot family Ranunculaceae that is native to the subantarctic region. The specific epithet comes from the Latin and refers to the plant's thicker and more succulent form compared to the closely related R. biternatus.

== Description ==
The plant is a perennial and stoloniferous herb, with glossy trifoliate leaves 15–150 mm long and usually 3–12 mm wide, with 2–5 acutely toothed lobes. The flowers are solitary with 5–7 petals and reddish-purple achenes. The plant flowers from December to March; it fruits in March, with the achenes persisting until September.

== Distribution ==
Ranunculus crassipes is found in boggy areas in the Kerguelen Islands, a French territory in the southern Indian Ocean, as well as on Australia’s Heard and Macquarie Islands.
