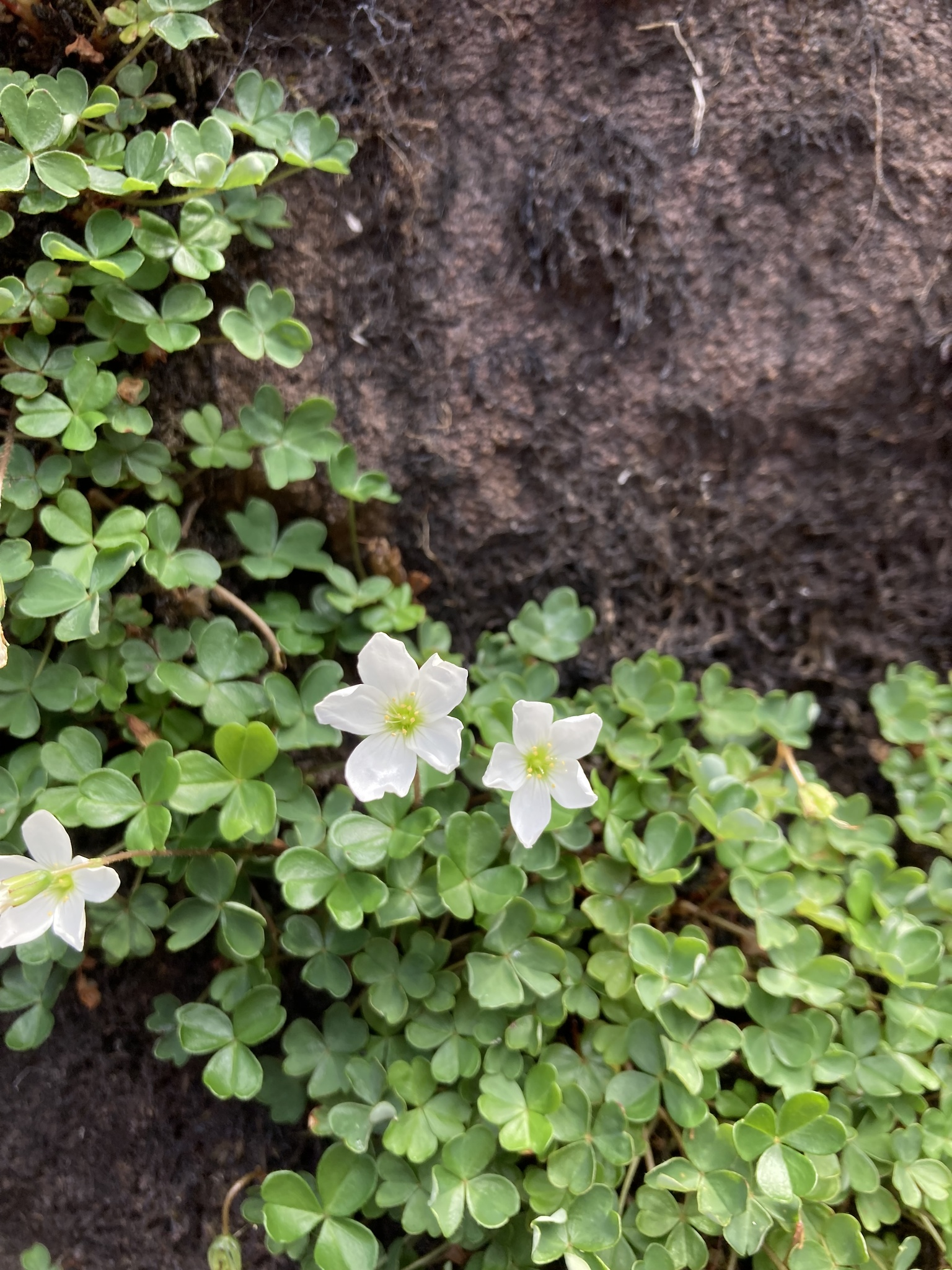

Scientific classification
- Kingdom: Plantae
- Clade: Tracheophytes
- Clade: Angiosperms
- Clade: Eudicots
- Clade: Rosids
- Order: Oxalidales
- Family: Oxalidaceae
- Genus: Oxalis
- Species: O. magellanica

Binomial name
- Oxalis magellanica G. Forst.

Synonyms
- Acetosella magellanica (G. Forst.) Kuntze; Acetosella modesta (Phil.) Kuntze; Oxalis carnosa Molina; Oxalis cataractae A. Cunn. Oxalis lactea Hook. Oxalis modesta Phil. Oxalis novae-zelandiae Gand.

= Oxalis magellanica =

Species of flowering plant

Oxalis magellanica or snowdrop wood-sorrel is an Oxalis species found in Chile, Argentina, New Zealand, and Tasmania. It was first described in 1789. It blooms from fall to spring with white flowers.

Its native distribution is puzzling given the wide geographic separation between its populations in Oceania and South America. It, along with other members of a clade within the section Oxalis that share a common ancestor dating back to roughly 30 Ma, have a strangely complex geographic distribution. This is especially perplexing given that the connection between Oceania and South America via Antarctica disappeared 35 million years ago, before the estimated diversification of the clade.
