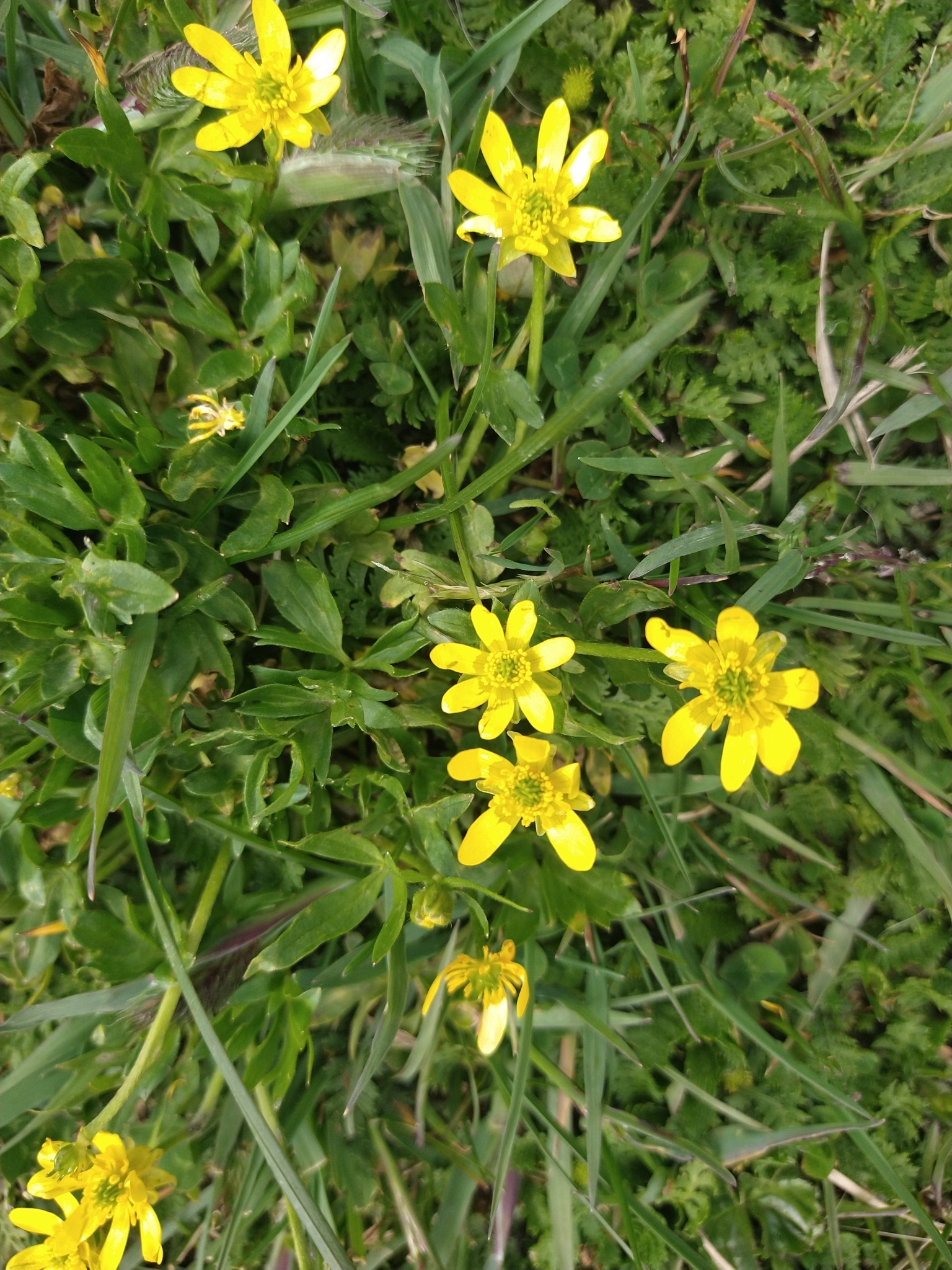

Scientific classification
- Kingdom: Plantae
- Clade: Tracheophytes
- Clade: Angiosperms
- Clade: Eudicots
- Order: Ranunculales
- Family: Ranunculaceae
- Genus: Ranunculus
- Species: R. peduncularis

Binomial name
- Ranunculus peduncularis Sm.

Synonyms
- R. andinus; R. erodiifolius; R. glandulifer; R. patagonicus

= Ranunculus peduncularis =

Species of flowering plant

Ranunculus peduncularis is a large perennial buttercup that grows in Patagonia on the margins of woods, scrubs and along streams, with long stems and deeply divided leaves. In the wild it flowers from spring to summer.

== Description ==
Ranunculus peduncularis is a perennial herbaceous plant of 10–50 cm (3.9–19.7 in) high, that grows in tufts from a rhizome. Its leaves are round, 6–8 cm in diameter, deeply incised to compound into three leaflets, each one of them two to three-lobed, with petioles of up to 20 cm (7.9 in) long. The flowers of 3½ cm (1.4 in) in diameter stand alone or with two or three together on a stem. The ten to twenty-two oblong petals are glossy rich yellow. In the variety erodiifolius the leaf is more deeply cut and the segments are narrower.

== Distribution and ecology ==
Ranunculus peduncularis is known from Chile and Argentina, where it grows from the central cordilleras in the North to Tierra del Fuego in the South, on grassy banks of stream, in meadows with scrubs and on the margin of woods, between sea level to 2,500 m (8,200 ft) depending on latitude. In Argentina the species has been found in the provinces Chubut, Mendoza, Neuquen, Rio Negro, Santa Cruz, and Tierra del Fuego, in Chile it occurs in the provinces Coquimbo, Valparaiso, O'Higgins, Maule, Bio Bio, Araucania, Los Lagos, Aisen, Magallanes, and Region Metropolitana.
