= Walter Hood Fitch =

Scottish botanical illustrator (1817-1892)

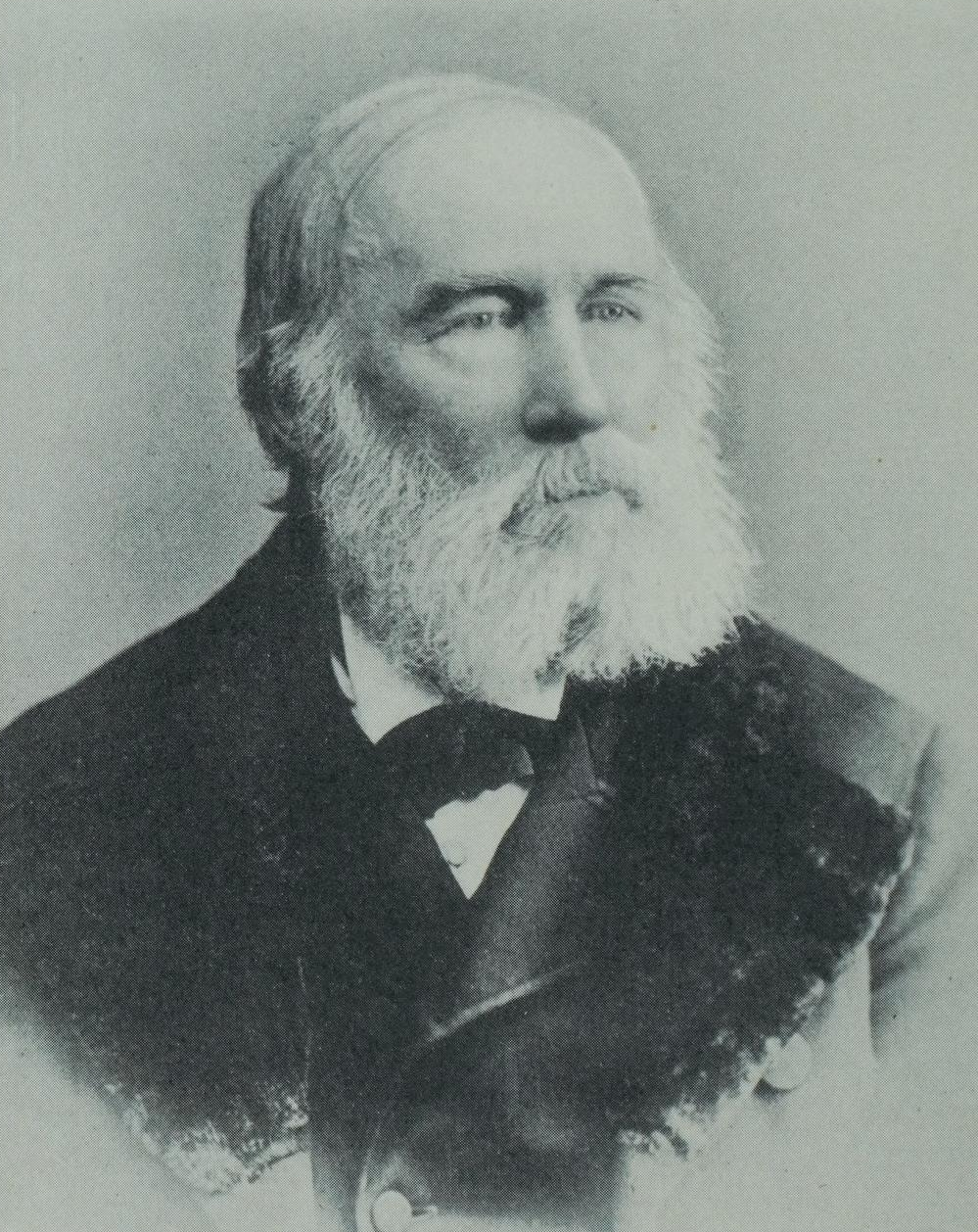

Walter Hood Fitch (28 February 1817 – 14 January 1892) was a botanical illustrator, born in Glasgow, Scotland, who executed some 10,000 drawings for various publications. His work in colour lithograph, including 2700 illustrations for Curtis's Botanical Magazine, produced up to 200 plates per year.

== Biography ==
Fitch was involved in fabric printing from the age of 17 and took to botanical art after meeting William Jackson Hooker, Regius Professor of Botany, a competent botanical illustrator, and the editor of Curtis's Botanical Magazine. Fitch's first lithograph of Mimulus roseus appeared in the Botanical Magazine in 1834, and he soon became its sole artist. In 1841 W.J. Hooker became director of Royal Botanic Gardens, Kew and Fitch moved to London. After 1841 Fitch was the sole artist for all official and unofficial publications issued by Kew; his work was paid for by Hooker personally. It was not unusual for him to work on several different publications simultaneously; he could draw directly onto the lithographic stone to save time. These chromolithographs were based on botanical illustrations provided by Hooker and others, and produced some of his most spectacular results.

Fitch's important works include his illustrations for William Hooker's A century of orchidaceous plants (1849), and for James Bateman's A Monograph of Odontoglossum (1864–74). He also created around 500 plates for Hooker's Icones Plantarum (1836–76) and four lithographic plates for the monograph Victoria Regia. The latter work received critical acclaim in the Athenaeum, "they are accurate, and they are beautiful".

Other works were for George Bentham's Handbook of the British Flora (1858, later editions edited by Joseph Dalton Hooker). When J. D, Hooker returned from his travels in India, Fitch prepared lithographs from Hooker's sketches for his Rhododendrons of Sikkim Himalaya (1849–51) and, from the drawings of Indian artists, for his Illustrations of Himalayan Plants (1855). He also produced the illustrations presented in the younger Hooker's The Botany of the Antarctic Voyage, consisting of six volumes covering the flora of the Antarctic, New Zealand, Tasmania, and outlying islands collected on the Ross expedition of 1839 to 1843.

A dispute over pay with J. D. Hooker ended Fitch's service to both the Botanical Magazine and Kew Gardens in 1877. He was much sought after and remained active as a botanical artist until 1888. Works during this period included Henry John Elwes's Monograph of the Genus Lilium (1877–80). His renown as a botanical illustrator was such that his obituary in Nature stated "... his reputation was so high and so world-wide that it is unnecessary to say much on this point."

The standard author abbreviation Fitch is used to indicate this individual as the author when citing a botanical name. Fitch was made a fellow of the Linnean Society in 1857. He died on 14 January 1892 and is buried in Richmond Old Cemetery together with his wife Hannah (died 13 March 1929).

The genus Fitchia is named for him.

His nephew, John Nugent Fitch (1840–1927), also produced illustrations for Curtis's Botanical Magazine.

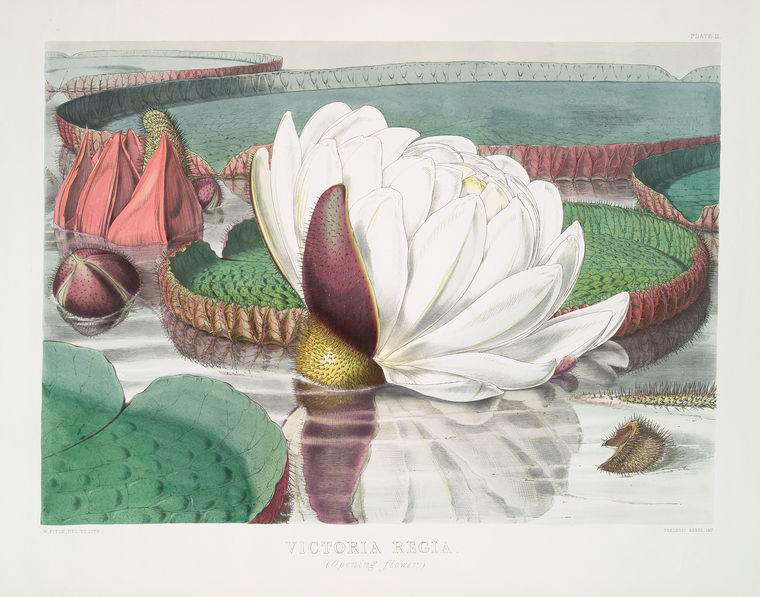
Plate 2, Victoria amazonica, of Victoria Regia, 1851

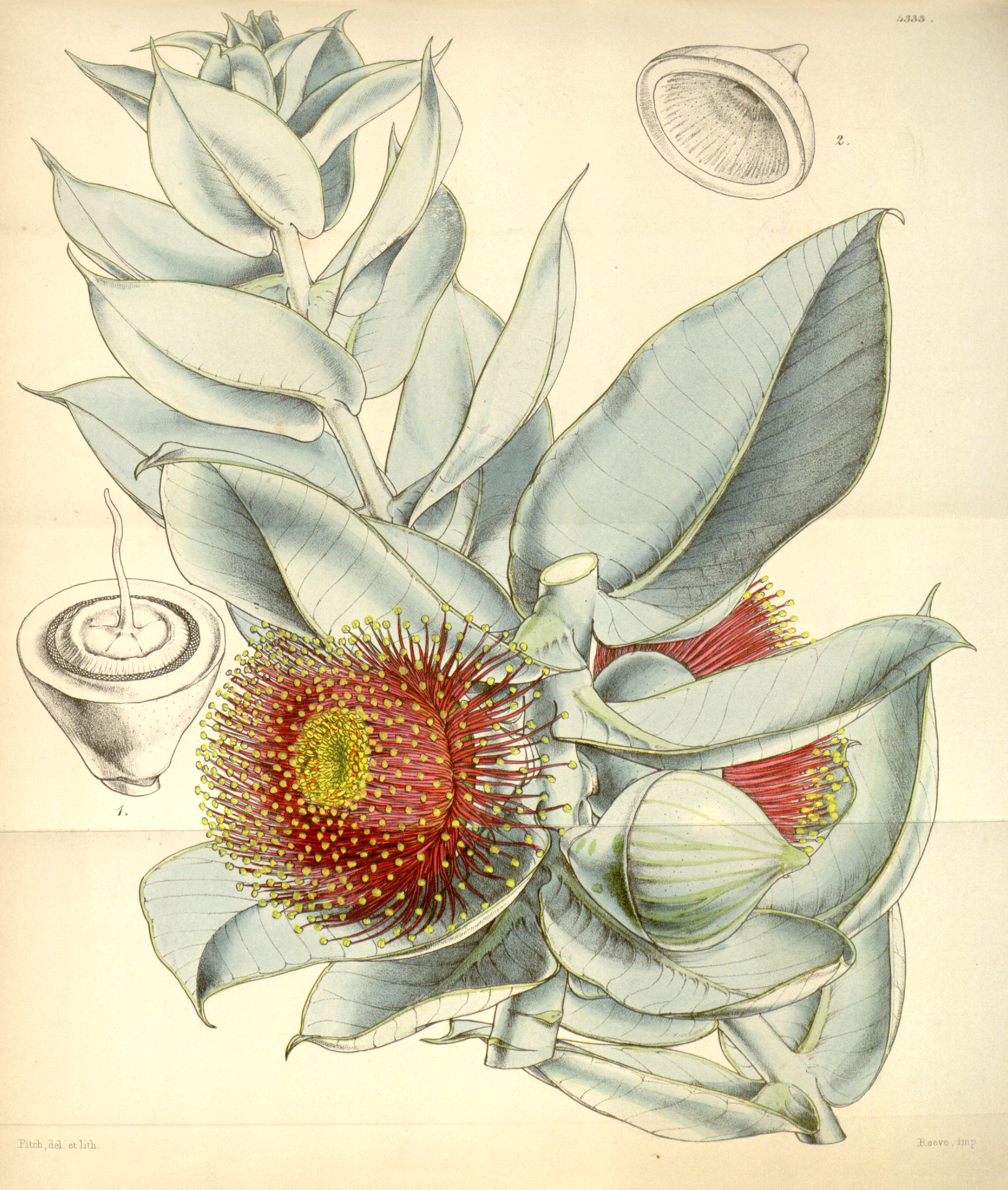
Eucalyptus macrocarpa
