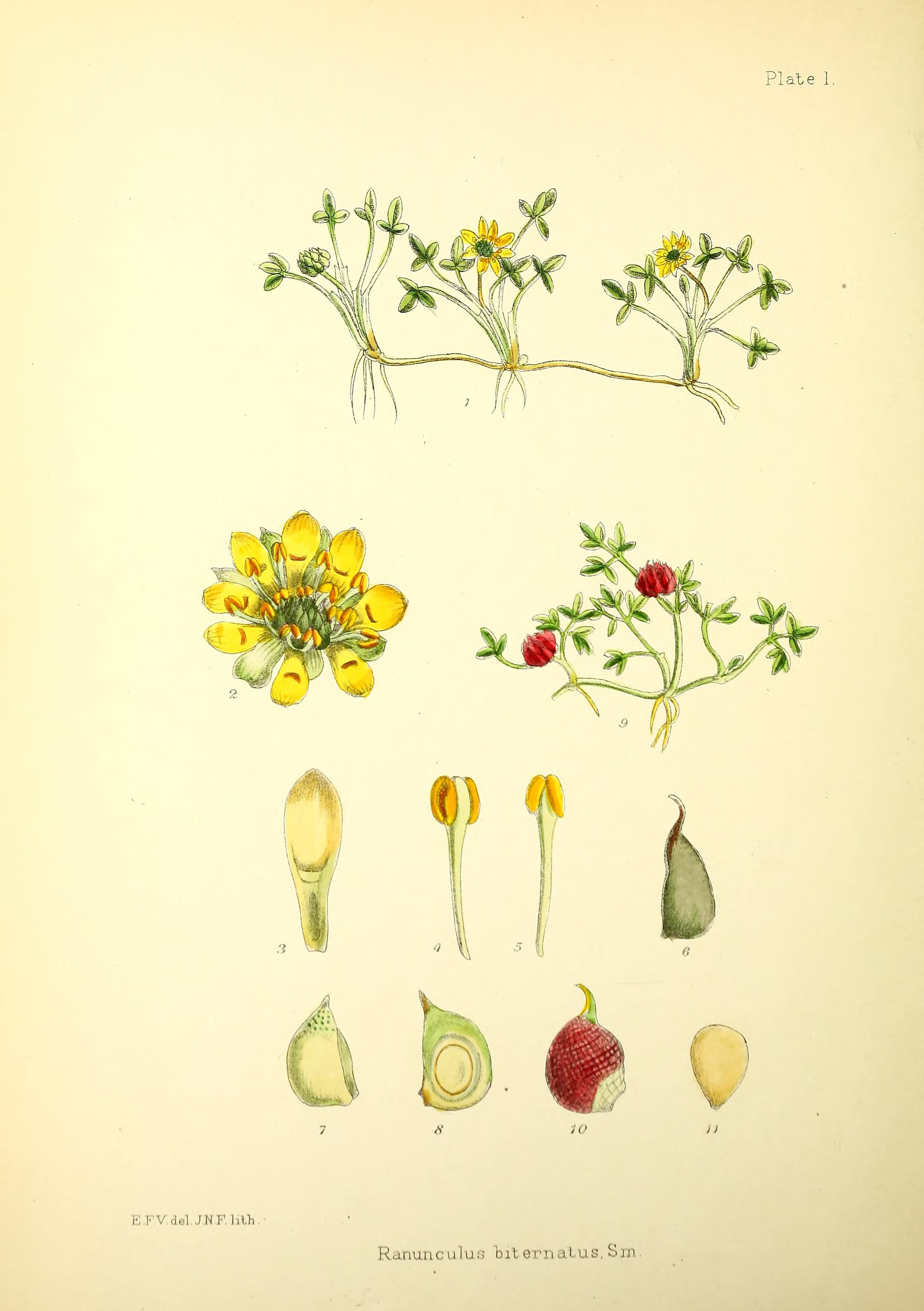
- From Illustrations of the flowering plants and ferns of the Falkland Islands

Scientific classification
- Kingdom: Plantae
- Clade: Tracheophytes
- Clade: Angiosperms
- Clade: Eudicots
- Order: Ranunculales
- Family: Ranunculaceae
- Genus: Ranunculus
- Species: R. biternatus

Binomial name
- Ranunculus biternatus Sm.

Synonyms
- Batrachium biternatum (Sm.) Bercht. & J.Presl; Casalea biternata (Sm.) A.St.-Hil.; Ranunculus commersonii DC. ex Poir.; Ranunculus exiguus d'Urv.; Ranunculus montteanus Phil.

= Ranunculus biternatus =

Antarctic buttercup

Species of plant

Ranunculus biternatus, the Antarctic buttercup, is a plant in the buttercup family Ranunculaceae. It is native to southern South America (Chile and Argentina) and some subantarctic islands.

== Description ==
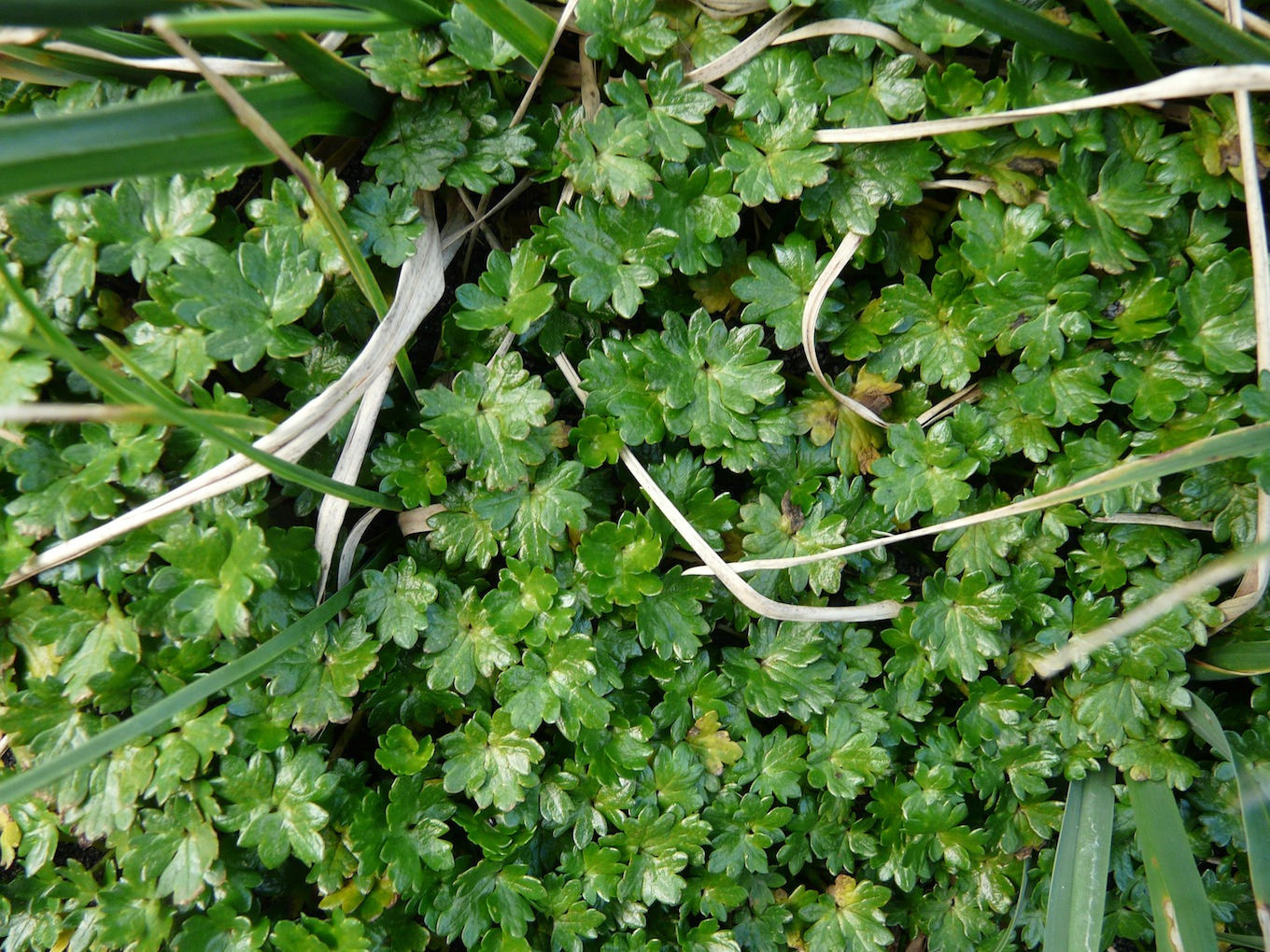
Leaves

Ranunculus biternatus grows as a forb. The leaves are mid to dark green, with at least three leaflets, each up to 2.5 centimetres (1 in) across. The flowers are yellow. The red or purple fruits resemble raspberries and are edible.

== Distribution and habitat ==
Ranunculus biternatus is native to Patagonia, the Falkland Islands and a number of subantarctic islands. The species is common in or near wet areas such as bogs, pools and streams, from sea level to 250 m (800 ft) altitude.
