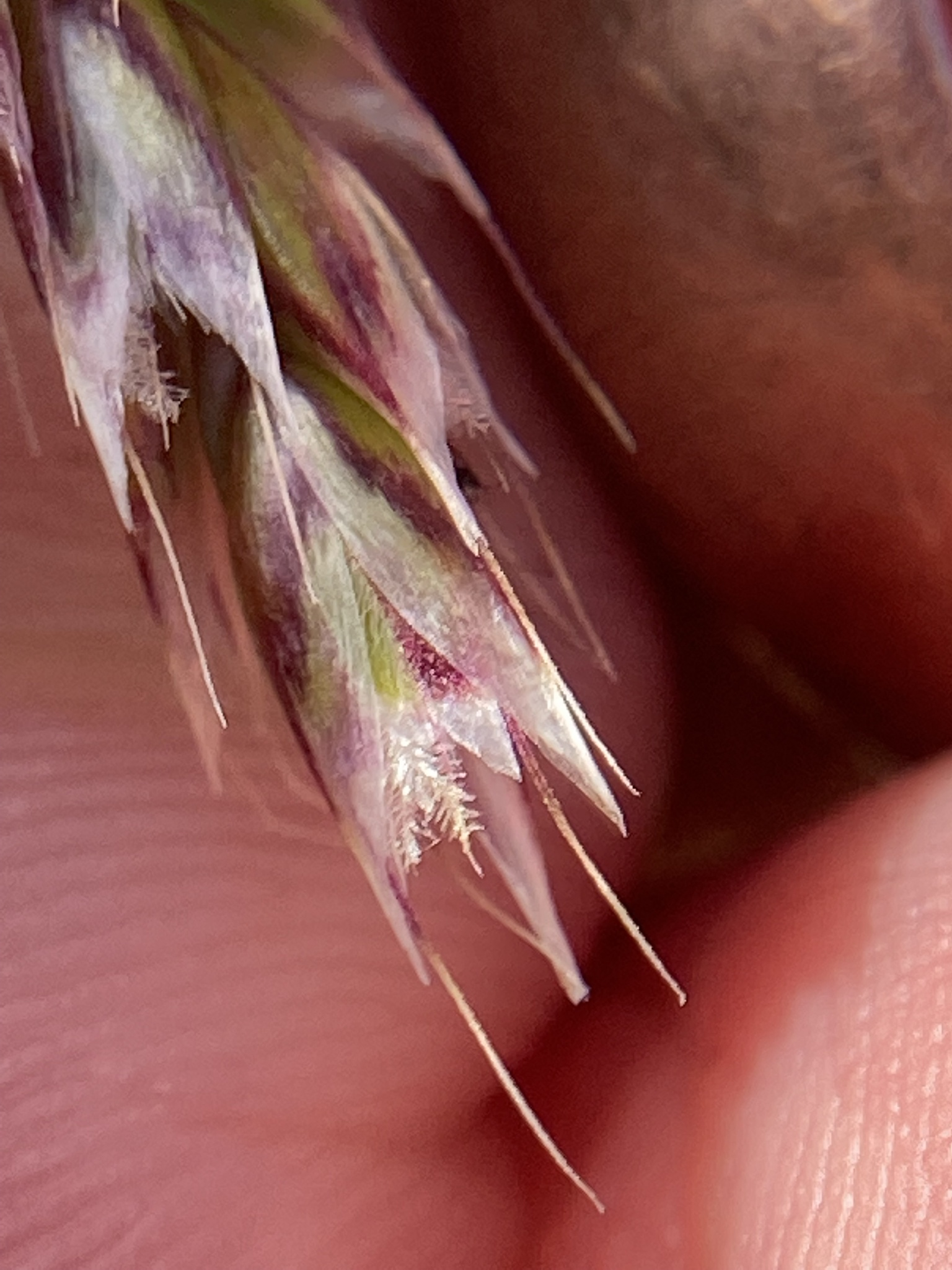

Scientific classification
- Kingdom: Plantae
- Clade: Tracheophytes
- Clade: Angiosperms
- Clade: Monocots
- Clade: Commelinids
- Order: Poales
- Family: Poaceae
- Subfamily: Pooideae
- Genus: Anthoxanthum
- Species: A. cupreum

Binomial name
- Anthoxanthum cupreum (Zotov) de Lange & C.J.James

Synonyms
- Hierochloe cuprea Zotov

= Anthoxanthum cupreum =

Species of plant

Anthoxanthum cupreum, also known as holy grass, is a species of grass endemic to New Zealand. It was described as Hierochloe cuprea by Russian-New Zealand botanist Victor Zotov in 1973.

== Distribution ==
Anthoxanthum cupreum is endemic to New Zealand. In the North Island, it is found on Taranaki Maunga, as well as in the Ruahine and Tararua Ranges. In the South Island, it is found from Kahurangi National Park, throughout the Southern Alps, in Victoria Forest Park, as well as in the mountains near Dunedin.

The type specimen was collected west of Kime Hut in the Tararua Ranges at c. 1400 metres above sea level, by Victor Zotov in 1933.

== Habitat ==
Anthoxanthum cupreum is an alpine species found in stream-side or tarn-side vegetation, damp flushes, and seepages within tussock grassland, cushion bogs and fell field.

== Biology ==
Anthoxanthum cupreum, like all New Zealand Anthoxanthum species that were formerly placed in Hierochloe, is andromonoecious. This means that plants have both hermaphrodite and male flowers. In particular, the florets in these species have two male florets on the outsides of their spikelets, while the floret in the middle is a hermaphrodite.

The base chromosomes number of native New Zealand Anthoxanthum is 2n = 7. A. cupreum, is the only species not to have had a chromosome count. Other chromosome counts include hexaploids, tetraploids, and 12-ploids.

== Ecology ==
Anthoxanthum cupreum is a host of the smut fungus Tilletia cathcartae. Prior to the evacuation of kakapō from the mainland South Island, A. cupreum was recorded as a food plant, with kakapō eating its shoots.

The pollination and dispersal of A. cupreum are by wind.

== Threats ==
Anthoxanthum cupreum is classified as At Risk - Declining under the New Zealand Threat Classification System. It is believed to be declining, but the trend is unclear.

== Taxonomy ==
Anthoxanthum cupreum was described as Hierochloe cuprea by Russian-New Zealand botanist Victor Zotov in 1973. In 1985, Dutch botanists Yolanda Schouten and Jan Frederik Veldkamp moved the Malesian and Thai species of Anthoxanthum, and considered the native Hierochloe species to be a part of that genus. However, they left New Zealand species in the genus Hierochloe. New Zealand botanist Henry Connor considered the two genera to be distinct, on the basis of their different reproductive system (andromonoecism) and base chromosome number (x = 7 c.f. x = 5). In 2024, Peter de Lange created names for all New Zealand species under Anthoxanthum.

== Gallery ==
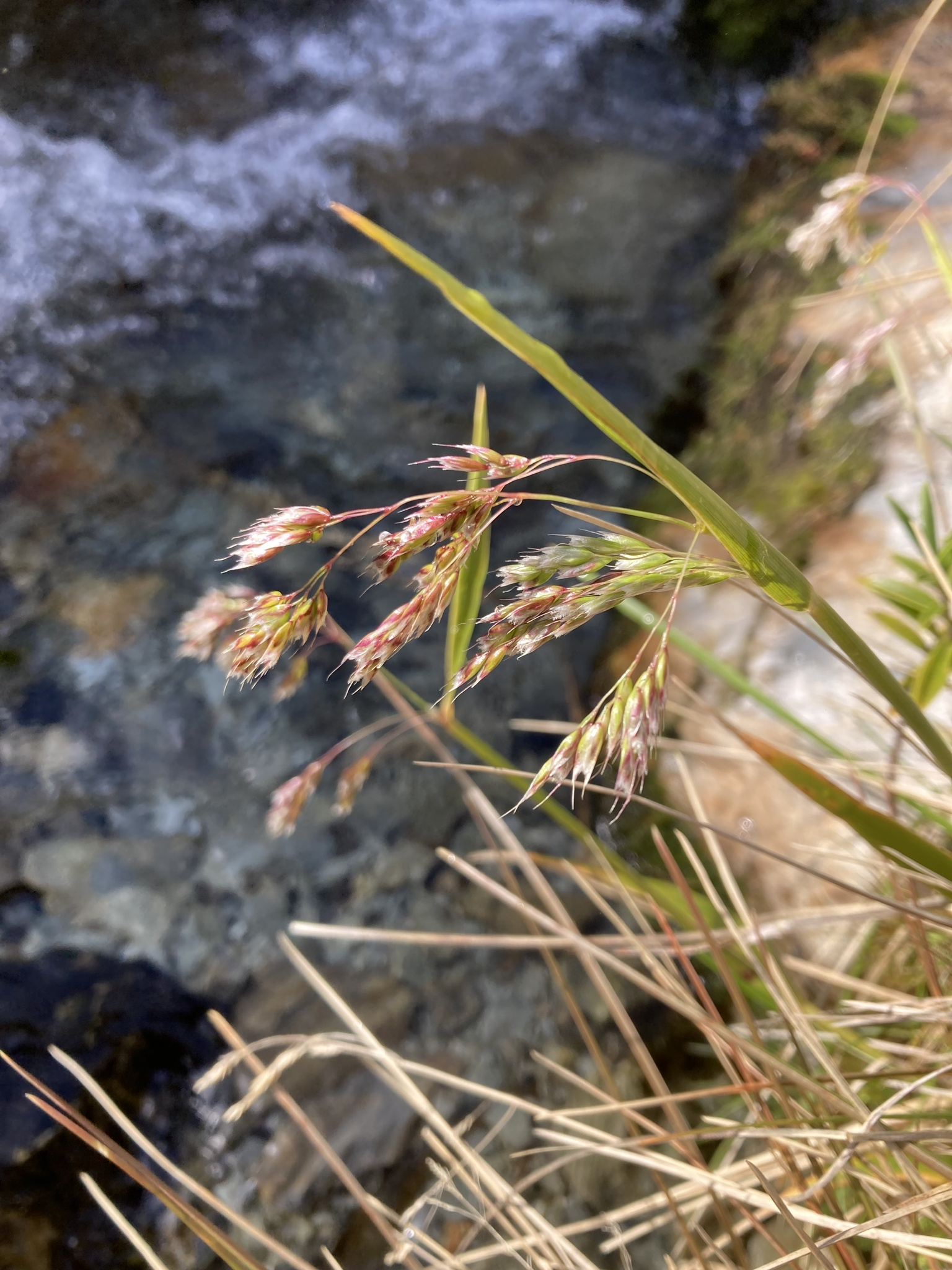

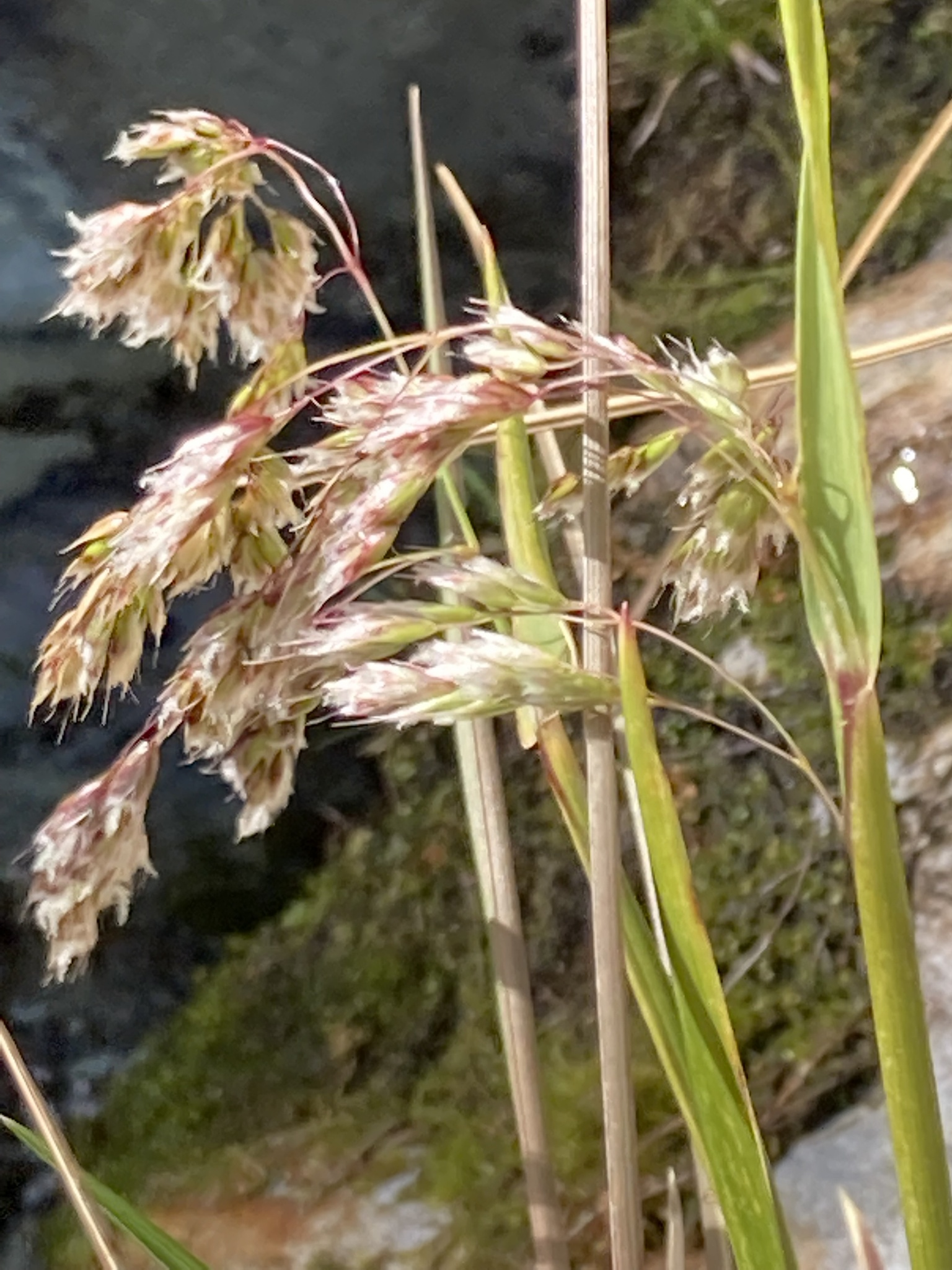
