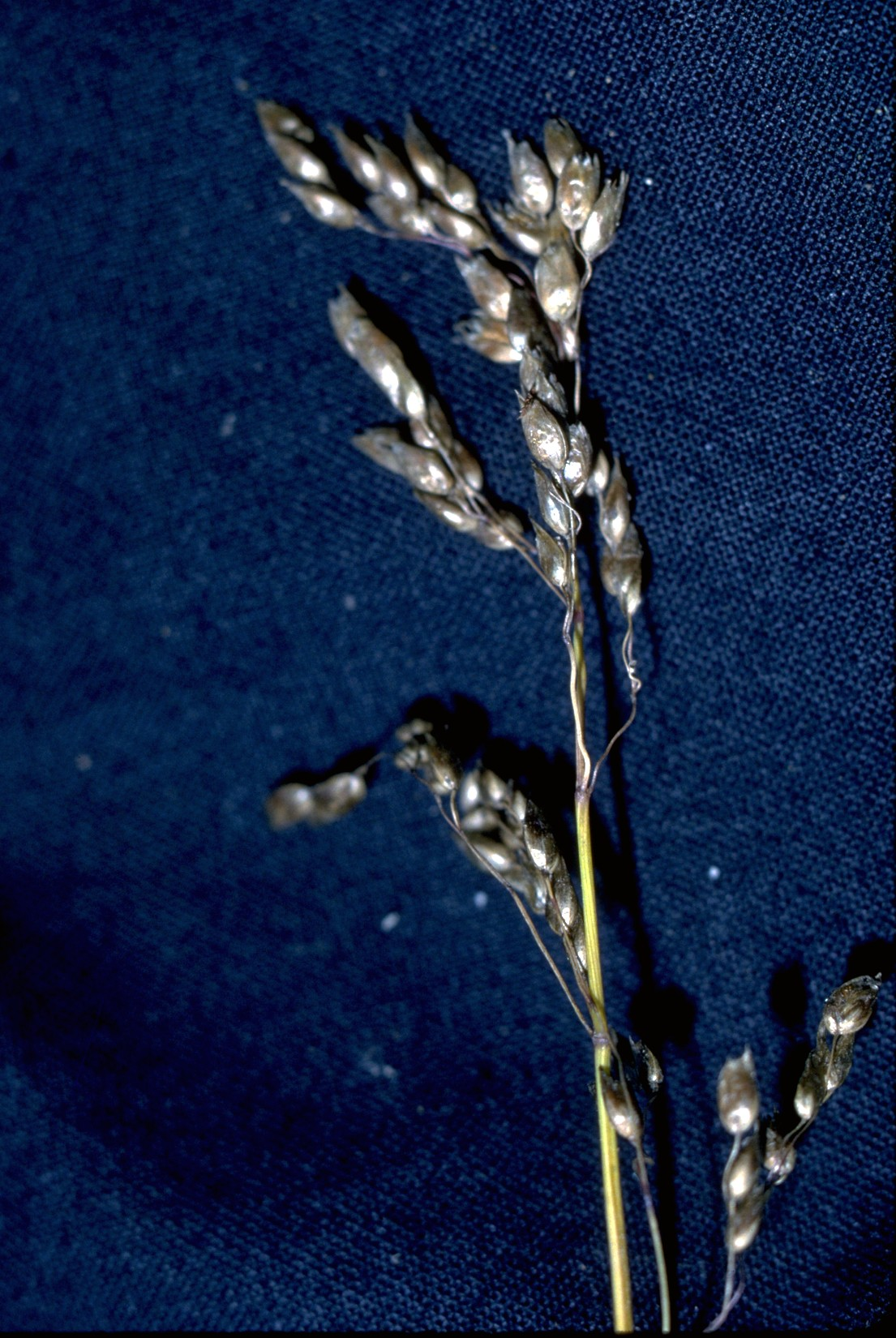

Conservation status
- Secure (NatureServe)

Scientific classification
- Kingdom: Plantae
- Clade: Tracheophytes
- Clade: Angiosperms
- Clade: Monocots
- Clade: Commelinids
- Order: Poales
- Family: Poaceae
- Genus: Hierochloe
- Species: H. odorata

Binomial name
- Hierochloe odorata (L.) P. Beauv.

Synonyms
- Anthoxanthum nitens (Weber) Y. Schouten & Veldk.; Hierochloe arctica J.Presl

= Hierochloe odorata =

Sweet grass, an aromatic herb

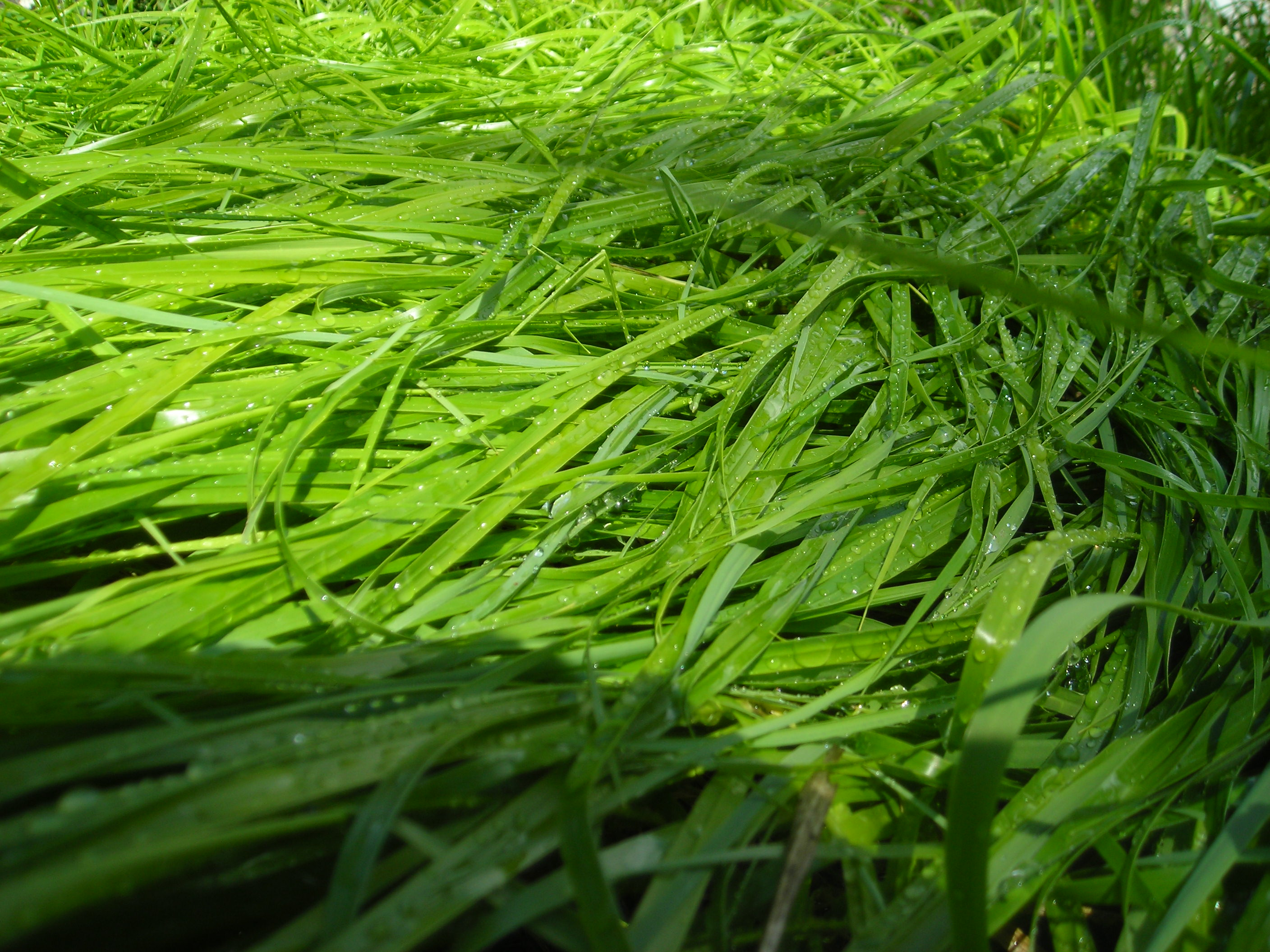
Sweet grass photographed in British Columbia, Canada 2007

Hierochloe odorata or Anthoxanthum nitens (commonly known as sweet grass, manna grass, Mary's grass or vanilla grass, and as holy grass in the UK, bison grass e.g. by Polish vodka producers) is an aromatic herb native to Northern Eurasia and North America. It is considered sacred by many Indigenous peoples in Canada and the United States. It is used as a smudge in herbal medicine and in the production of distilled beverages (e.g., Żubrówka, Wisent). It owes its distinctive sweet scent to the presence of coumarin.

This variety of grass is distinct from the species commonly known as buffalo grass in Australia and the United States (Stenotaphrum secundatum and Bouteloua dactyloides, respectively).

== Characteristics ==
Hierochloe odorata is a very hardy perennial, able to grow in the Arctic Circle. Its leaves do not have rigid stems, so only grow to about 20 cm (7.9 in) in height, and then the leaves grow outward horizontally to 100 cm (39 in) long or more, by late summer. The base of the leaf, just below the soil surface, is broad and white, without hairs; The underside of the leaf is shiny and glabrous. In the wild, the bases of the leaves are frequently purple-red colored, and this indicates a phosphorus-deficient soil.

Two chemicals found in sweetgrass, phytol and coumarin, repel mosquitoes.

== Taxonomy ==
The name Hierochloe odorata is from the Greek and Latin. Hierochloe means "holy grass" and odorata means "fragrant". Some authors include Hierochloe in Anthoxanthum; in this case this species is given the epithet nitens to avoid confusion with a different species, Anthoxanthum odoratum, sweet vernal grass.

== Distribution ==
In North America Hierochloe odorata occurs in southern Canada, northern Great Plains/Rocky Mountains and northwest of U.S., and New England. In continental Europe it occurs north from Switzerland. There is only one site in Ireland, and it is recorded in four counties of Scotland and one in north-eastern England.

== Ecology ==
Hierochloe odorata is a marshland species occupying the middle range of habitat between dune and salt marsh ecosystems. The species shows little preference for a soil's nutrient or water content, but is rigidly restricted by pH and salinity. The species is consistently associated with Juncus balticus in marshlands, and Ammophila breviligulata in dune ecosystems. The species reaches peak abundance on the edge of these competing species ranges. The associated plants are thought to be major inhibitors of growth. The species is only documented to be browsed by the American pika (Ochotona princeps) and European bison. Other native herbivores, such as white-tailed deer, elk or American bison may graze on it. The chemical coumarin, which creates the species signature vanilla smell, has a bitter taste that deters grazers.

== Propagation ==
Propagation is easiest by cutting out plugs from established plants. These plugs should have at least one active rhizome, and grow rapidly under greenhouse care. When establishing stands in the wild, Hierochloe odorata seeds require a period of cold temperatures before they germinate, and germinate at a rate of 25-50%. Hierochloe odorata grows best in soil with few competing weeds, loose texture and moistened to the point of surface puddling. Seedlings require constant moisture until they sprout, around 10 to 14 days later.

== Uses ==
The plant is harvested by cutting grass in early to late summer at the desired length. Hierochloe odorata harvested after the first frost has little or no scent and is less desirable for basketry. Basketweavers sun-dry cut sweet grass until it is dry and brittle. The brittle form of sweet grass must be soaked in warm water until it becomes pliable. The pliable grass is typically braided into thick threads and then redried for use.

=== European traditions ===
Holy grass was strewn before church doors on saints' days in northern Europe, presumably because of the sweet smell that arose when it was trodden on. It was used in France to flavor candy, tobacco, soft drinks, and perfumes. In Europe, the species Hierochloe alpina is frequently substituted or used interchangeably. In Russia, it was used to flavor tea. It is still used in flavored vodka, such as the Polish Żubrówka.

In Finnmark, Sámi peoples have braided and dried the grass (háissasuoidni in Northern Sámi) to use as a perfume, either directly or by storing it with clothes.

=== Indigenous traditions (North America) ===
Sweetgrass is widely used by Indigenous peoples from many different Nations in North America. The Haudenosaunee (Iroquois) tribes have been known to use sweetgrass in a variety of ways, such as basketry, ceremonial smudging, incense, perfume, and herbal medicine. Among many of the Indigenous peoples of the Great Plains and Canadian Prairies it is considered one of the "four sacred medicines". Though being used for many purposes, its main two purposes for many tribes are to attract good spirits and as a natural mosquito repellent. It is also known as the "Hair of Mother Earth". Robin Wall Kimmerer writes about sweetgrass and its sustainable harvesting in her book Braiding Sweetgrass.
