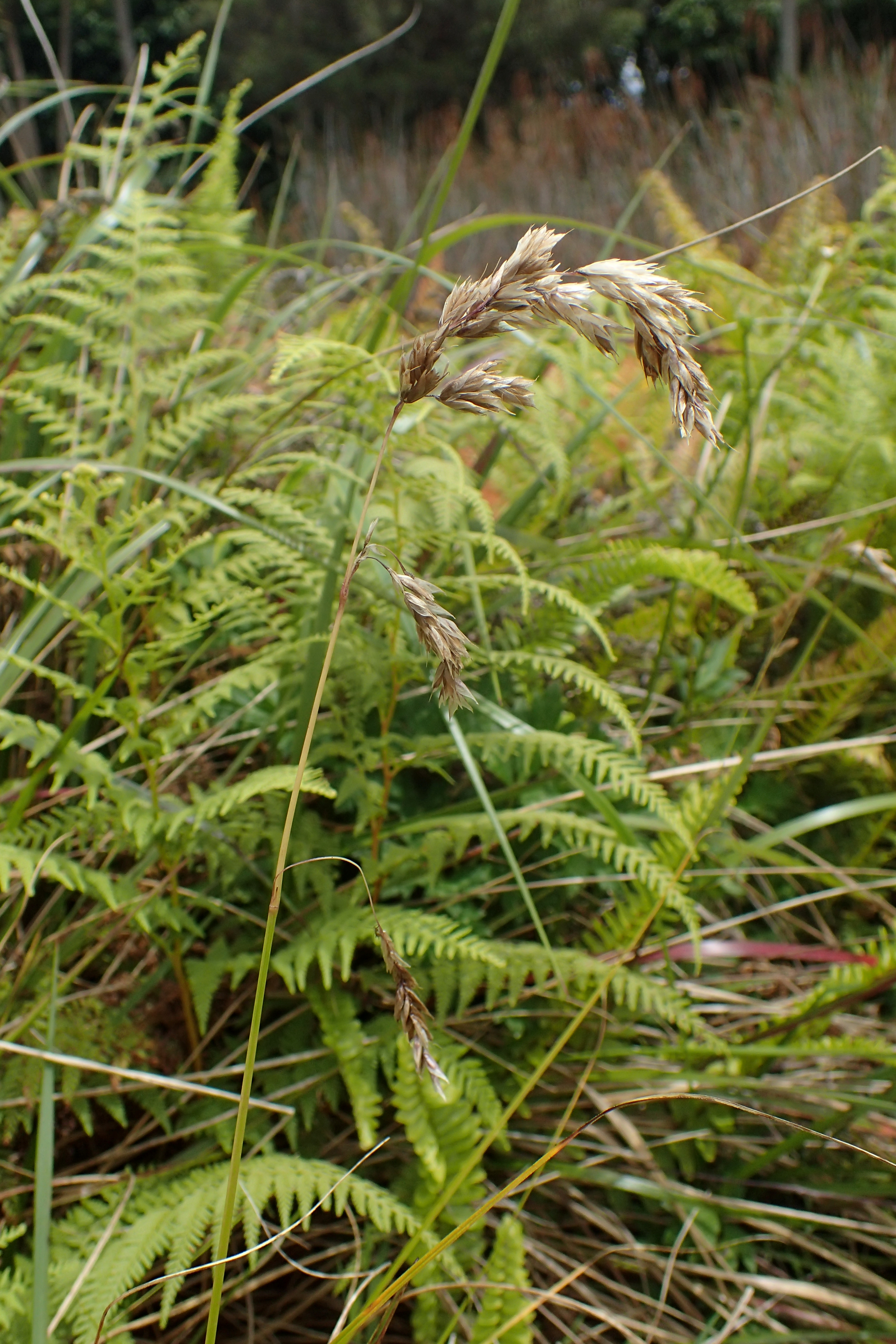

Scientific classification
- Kingdom: Plantae
- Clade: Tracheophytes
- Clade: Angiosperms
- Clade: Monocots
- Clade: Commelinids
- Order: Poales
- Family: Poaceae
- Subfamily: Pooideae
- Genus: Anthoxanthum
- Species: A. redolens

Binomial name
- Anthoxanthum redolens (Vahl) P.Royen, 1979

= Anthoxanthum redolens =

Species of plant

Anthoxanthum redolens, also known as holy grass, kāretu (Te Reo Māori), and cinnamon grass (Falkland Islands), is a species of grass native mostly to the Southern Hemisphere, as well as Ecuador. It was originally described as Holcus redolens by Martin Vahl in 1791 from a specimen collected in Tierra del Fuego.

== Description ==
A. redolens is a perennial, tufted grass with 8-45 cm long, 5-12 mm wide aromatic leaf-blades. The culms are 36-100 cm tall bearing compound panicle inflorescences. The spikelets are solitary on 1-7 mm pedicels.

Plants in New Zealand differ from plants in South America, the Falklands, and Tierra del Fuego. In all cases, the spikelets are 3-flowered. In New Zealand, they comprise an upper hermaphrodite floret, surrounded by two male florets. However, in South American plants, this upper floret is female, with two pollen-sterile anthers.

From other native New Zealand Anthoxanthum species, A. redolens differs in that the hermaphrodite floret is normally awned. The awns of the male florets are inserted near the lemma base and are normally straight.

== Distribution ==
A. redolens is indigenous to New Zealand, Australia, New Guinea, Argentina, Chile, the Falkland Islands, Bolivia, Peru, and Ecuador.

=== New Zealand ===
In New Zealand, it is found in the North, South, Three Kings, Campbell, and Chatham Islands.

=== Australia ===
In Australia, it is found in New South Wales, Victoria, and Tasmania.

Peru, Bolivia, and Ecuador

In Peru, it is found at 3,300-4,400 metres above sea level in the Andes and the Puna. However, some authors regard plants from Peru, Bolivia, and Ecuador as not fitting with the southern South American plants, possibly warranting recognition as separate species.

== Habitat ==
A. redolens is usually found in wet subalpine to alpine grasslands.

On Steeple Jason Island, off the Falkland Islands, A. redolens is found in fens, as well as grasslands comprising Cortaderia pilosa, Austroblechnum penna-marina, Rumex acetosella, Holcus lanatus, Agrostis capillaris, and Trisetum phleoides.

On Mt Willhelm, Papua New Guinea, A. redolens is co-dominant in tussockland with Deschampsia klossii and Poa saruwagedica.

In South America, A. redolens is described as living in both high-altitude meadows and at sea level, but always in humid places, and usually next to watercourses. Near Punta Arenos, a community dominated by A. redolens and Alopecurus antarcticus is described. This community is found on beaches made up of organic matter deposited by waves, forming an open cover of the two dominant species, in association with Poa fueguina, Agropyron magellanicum, and the daisy Senecio smithii.

== Ecology ==
In New Zealand, A. redolens sometimes grows on the 'trunks' produced by the large wetland sedge Carex secta.

=== Parasites ===
A. redolens is a host to numerous species of fungi and virus. It hosts fungi such as the rusts Uredo karetu and Puccinia graminis; the leaf-spot fungus Lophodermium gramineum; and sac fungi Mycosphaerella recutita and Pyrenophora chaetomioides. It also hosts a previously undiscovered Luteovirus. Of these, Uredo karetu is so far known only on A. redolens.

=== Herbivores ===
Prior to the evacuation of kakapō from the mainland South Island, A. redolens was recorded as one of its food plants, with kakapō eating its shoots. A. redolens is also eaten by cattle and sheep.

Other

A. redolens is used by Magellanic penguins on Martillo Island, Argentina for lining nesting burrows, producing bare pedestals made of tufts where leaves have been removed. The species epithet redolens may be a transliteration of its common name in Chile, ratonera, which translates to "mousetrap", which comes from larger plants being used by rodents as nests.

== Ethnobotany ==
In New Zealand, A. redolens is considered a tāonga (treasure) species by Māori, who call it karetū. Due to its pleasant smell, it was used to line sitting and sleeping places, or worn around the neck, head, and waist as a source of perfume. It was sometimes used by tōhunga (priests or healers) in rituals to restore fertility to women who had been unsuccessful in conceiving. The name karetū is thought to have been imported by Māori from Polynesia, from the unrelated but also aromatic grass Cymbopogon refractus, which is called 'aretu on the Society Islands.

== Threats ==
In New Zealand, A. redolens is generally considered not threatened nationally, but is threatened in some regions. In the South Island it used to be much more common throughout the lowlands, but has been reduced through agricultural burning and herbivory by introduced ungulate mammals, particularly cattle and sheep.

== Taxonomy ==
Anthoxanthum redolens was originally described as Holcus redolens by Martin Vahl in 1791 from a specimen collected in Tierra del Fuego.

Russian-New Zealand botanist Victor Zotov considered that South American and Fuegian plants should be removed from A. redolens into another species, but considered Australian and New Zealand plants the same species. He also believed that the location listed on the type specimen (Tierra del Fuego) was incorrect, given that he said it was more like New Zealand plants than Fuegian plants. María Elena de Paula agrees, stating that the type exhibits clearly hermaphroditic terminal flowers, whereas Fuegian plants have pollen-sterile terminal flowers. However, Moore and Doggett compared numerous specimens from Tierra del Fuego, Argentina, and the Falklands, and considered them to have substantial overlap with New Zealand plants. They do not, however, discuss the sexual systems of their plants.

A. redolens has many synonyms, including Holcus redolens Vahl, Avena redolens (Vahl) Pers., Hierochloe redolens (Vahl) Roem. & Schult., Torresia redolens (Vahl) Roem & Shult., and Hierochloe antarctica (Vahl) Roem.

=== Etymology ===
Anthoxanthum - From the Greek anthos meaning flower and xanthum meaning yellow, referring to the colour of the panicles.

redolens: from the Latin redoleo, meaning to give off odour. Or possibly as a transliteration of its common name in Chile, ratonera, which translates to "mousetrap", which comes from larger plants being used by rodents as nests.
