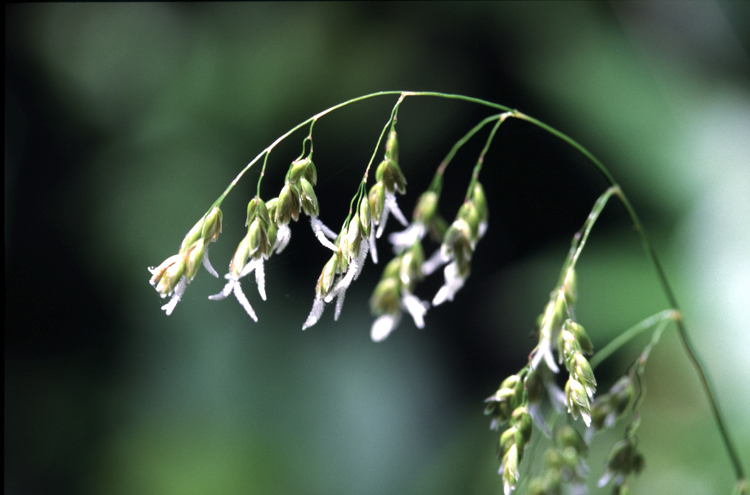

Conservation status
- Secure (NatureServe)

Scientific classification
- Kingdom: Plantae
- Clade: Tracheophytes
- Clade: Angiosperms
- Clade: Monocots
- Clade: Commelinids
- Order: Poales
- Family: Poaceae
- Subfamily: Pooideae
- Genus: Anthoxanthum
- Species: A. occidentale

Binomial name
- Anthoxanthum occidentale (Buckley) Veldkamp

Synonyms
- Hierochloe occidentalis Buckley; Hierochloe macrophylla Thurb. ex Bol.; Savastana macrophylla (Thurb. ex Bol.) Beal; Torresia macrophylla (Thurb. ex Bol.) Hitchc.

= Anthoxanthum occidentale =

Species of grass

Anthoxanthum occidentale is a species of grass known by the common name California sweetgrass. It is a close relative of the more widely known sweet grass. It is native to the west coast of the United States from Washington to California, where it grows in the coniferous forests of the coastal mountain ranges. This is a rhizomatous perennial grass with leaves up to 30 centimetres (12 in) long and 1.5 cm (0.59 in) wide. The stem reaches a metre in height with an inflorescence of 7 to 10 centimetres (2.8 to 3.9 in). The spikelets grow on short, wavy stalks and each has three florets with long, protruding stamens during flowering.
