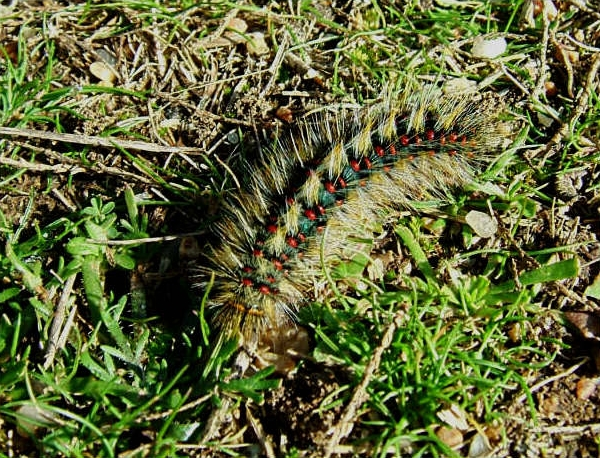

Scientific classification
- Domain: Eukaryota
- Kingdom: Animalia
- Phylum: Arthropoda
- Class: Insecta
- Order: Lepidoptera
- Family: Lasiocampidae
- Genus: Chondrostega
- Species: C. vandalicia

Binomial name
- Chondrostega vandalicia (Millière, 1865)

Synonyms
- Bombyx vandalicia Millière, 1865

= Chondrostega vandalicia =

Species of moth

Chondrostega vandalicia is a moth of the family Lasiocampidae. It is endemic to the Iberian Peninsula.

Adult males have grey wings with a wingspan of about 15 millimetres (0.59 in). They are weak fliers. Females have reduced wings and are incapable of flight. Adult males are on the wing from August to September.

The larvae can be found from November to April and mainly feed on grass species such as Nardus stricta, Festuca and Anthoxanthum aristatum, but also other low growing plants such as Hypochaeris radicata.
