= Whitwell Common SSSI =

UK Site of Special Scientific Interest

Coordinates: 52.741°N 1.089°E

- Site of Special Scientific Interest
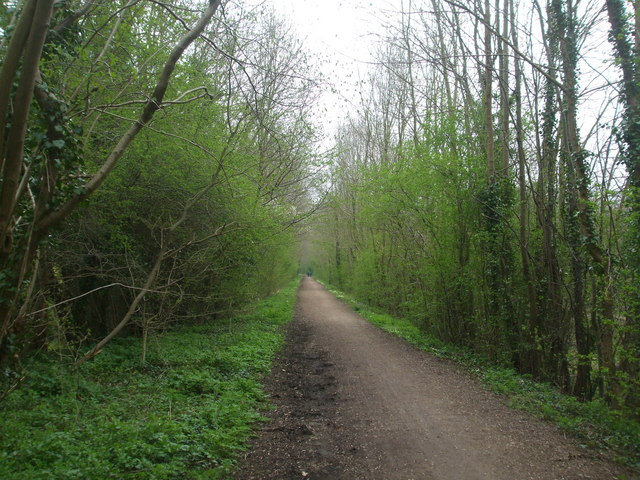
- Location of Whitwell Common SSSI.
- Area of search: Norfolk
- Grid reference: TG 086 204
- Interest: Biological
- Area: 19.4 hectares (48 acres)
- Notification date: 1985
- Location map: Magic Map

Whitwell Common is a 19.4-hectare (48-acre) biological Site of Special Scientific Interest north-east of Dereham in Norfolk, England.

This common in the valley of a tributary of the River Wensum has diverse wetland flora on peat soils. There are also areas of wet alder woodland, fen and unimproved grassland, with grasses such as sheep's fescue and Yorkshire fog.

The site is open to the public.
