= Pasture =

Land used for grazing

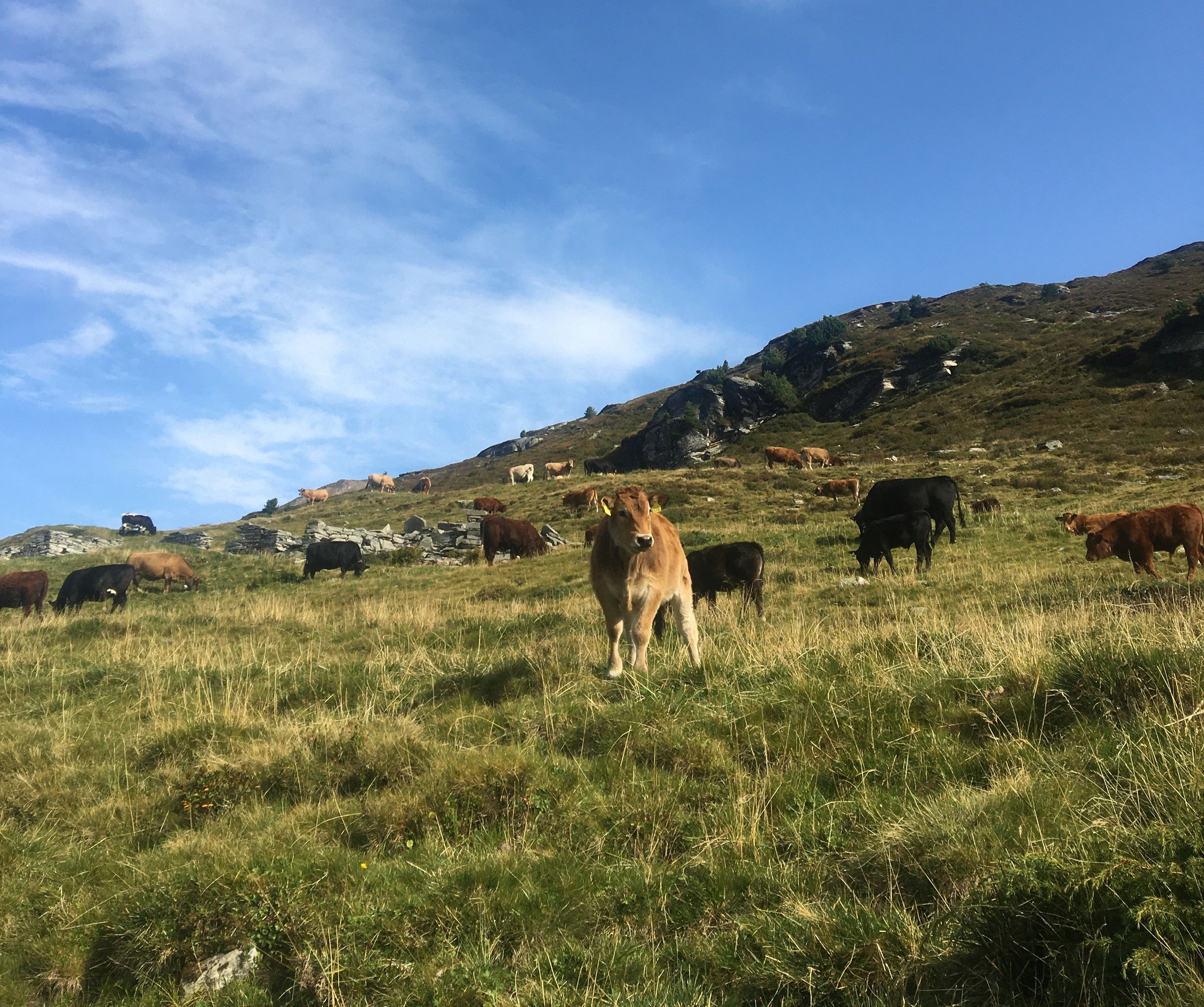
Mountain pasture in Switzerland

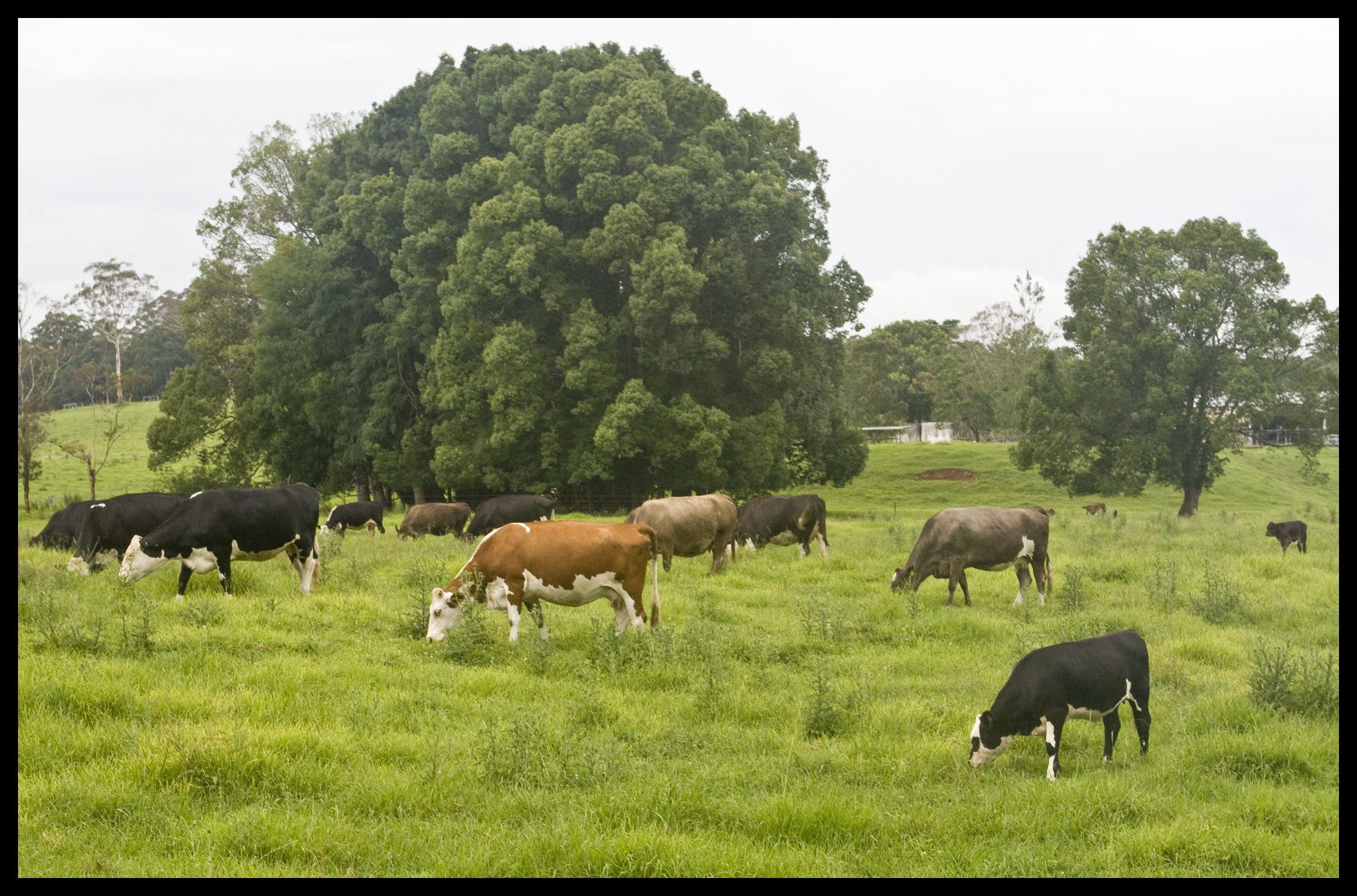
Lush lowland pasture

Pasture (from Latin pāstus 'fed, nourished; pastured'; past participle of pāscere 'to feed') is land used for grazing.

== Types of pasture ==
Pasture lands in the narrow sense are enclosed tracts of farmland, grazed by domesticated livestock, such as horses, cattle, sheep, or swine. The vegetation of tended pasture, forage, consists mainly of grasses, with an interspersion of legumes and other forbs (non-grass herbaceous plants). Pasture is typically grazed throughout the summer, in contrast to meadow which is ungrazed or used for grazing only after being mown to make hay for animal fodder.

Pasture in a wider sense additionally includes rangelands, other unenclosed pastoral systems, and land types used by wild animals for grazing or browsing. Pasture lands in the narrow sense are distinguished from rangelands by being managed through more intensive agricultural practices of seeding, irrigation, and the use of fertilizers, while rangelands grow primarily native vegetation, managed with extensive practices like controlled burning and regulated intensity of grazing.

Soil type, minimum annual temperature, and rainfall are important factors in pasture management.

World agricultural land by use, permanent meadows and pastures and cropland

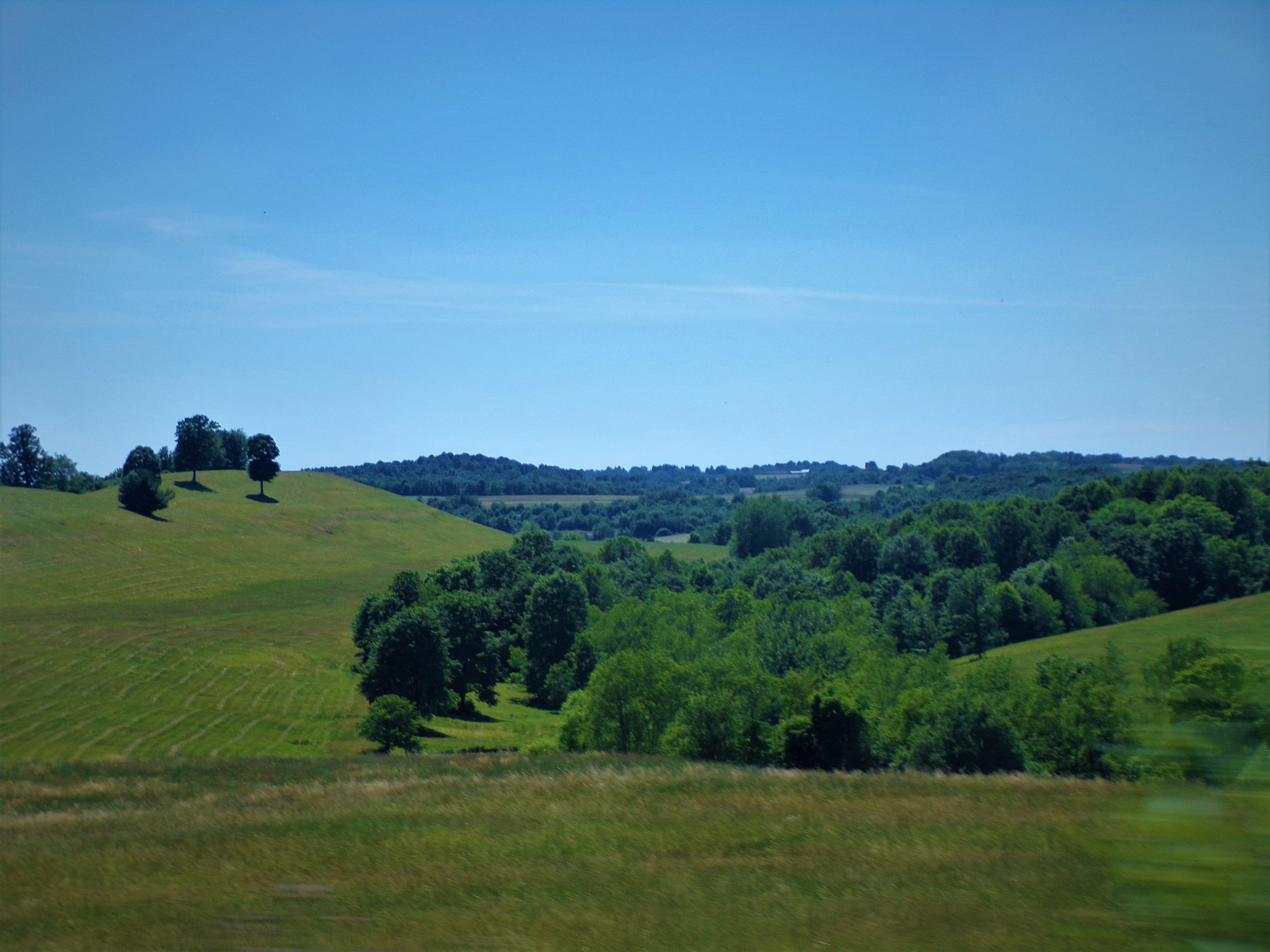
Hillside pasture in Pennsylvania.

Sheepwalk is an area of grassland where sheep can roam freely. The productivity of sheepwalk is measured by the number of sheep per area. This is dependent, among other things, on the underlying rock. Sheepwalk is also the name of townlands in County Roscommon, Ireland, and County Fermanagh, Northern Ireland. Unlike factory farming, which entails in its most intensive form entirely trough-feeding, managed or unmanaged pasture is the main food source for ruminants.

Pasture feeding dominates livestock farming where the land makes crop sowing or harvesting (or both) difficult, such as in arid or mountainous regions, where types of camel, goat, antelope, yak and other ruminants live which are well suited to the more hostile terrain and very rarely factory-farmed. In more humid regions, pasture grazing is managed across a large global area for free range and organic farming. Certain pasture types suit the diet, evolution, and metabolism of particular animals. Their fertilising and tending of the land may over generations result in the pasture combined with the ruminants in question being integral to a particular ecosystem.

== Examples of pasture habitats ==
- Bocage
- Grassland
- Heathland
- Machair
- Maquis
- Moorland
- Pampas
- Potrero (landform)
- Prairie
- Rangeland
- Rough pasture
- Savanna
- Sown biodiverse pasture
- Steppe
- Wood pasture
- Veld
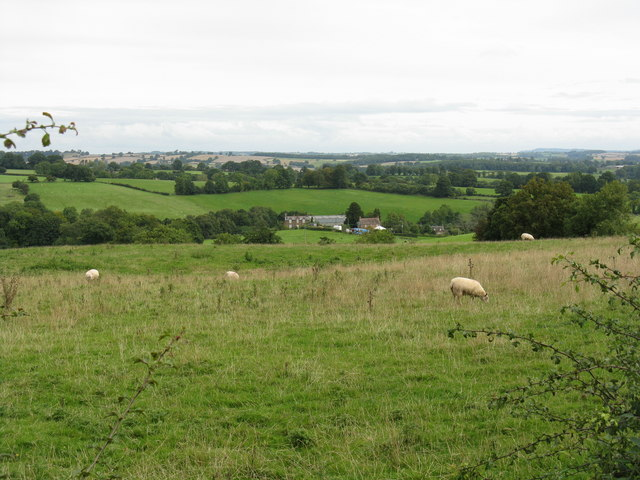
Red Hill Farm and fields sheep pasture at Bredenbury, Herefordshire, England

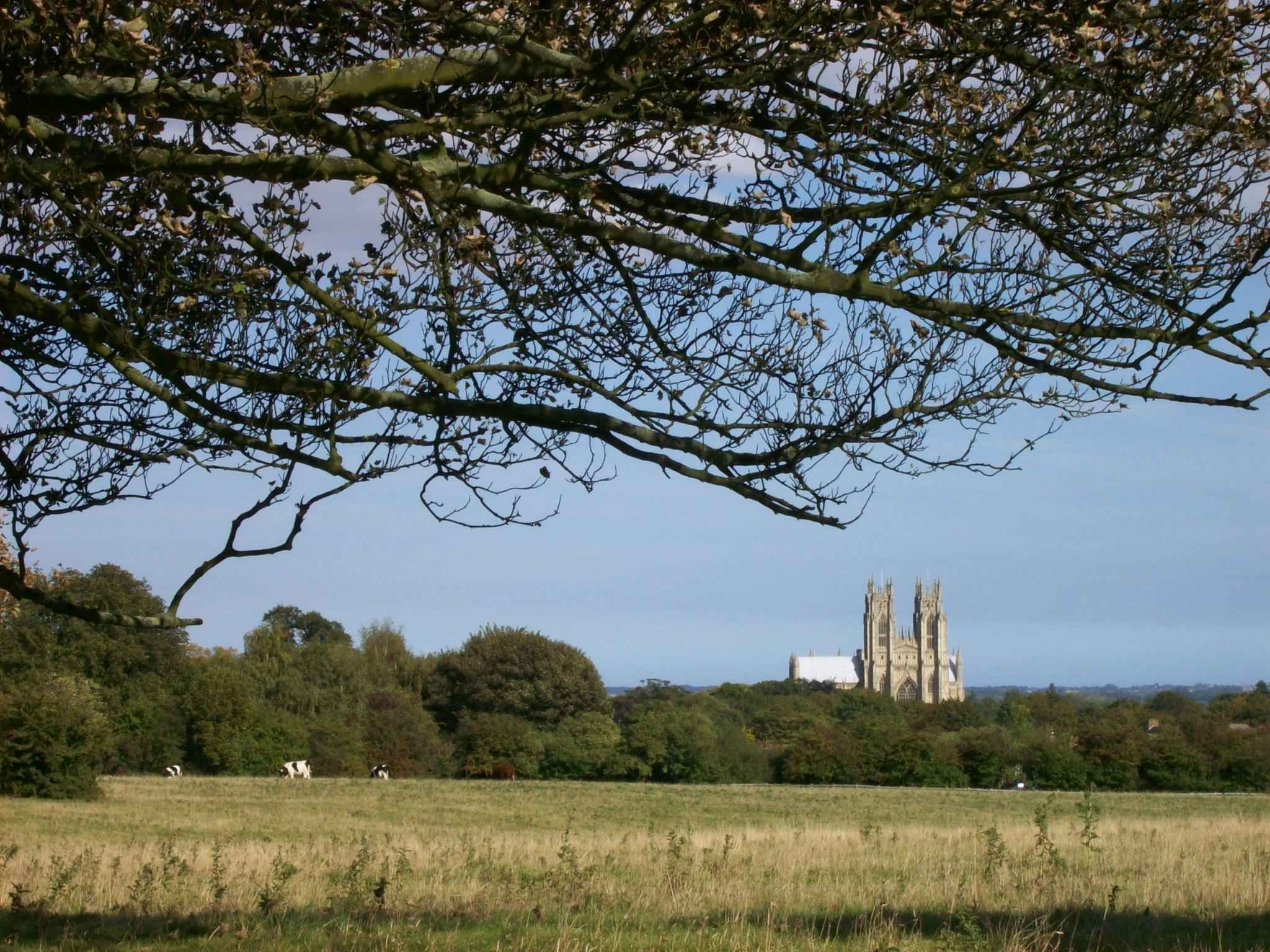
A pasture in the East Riding of Yorkshire in England

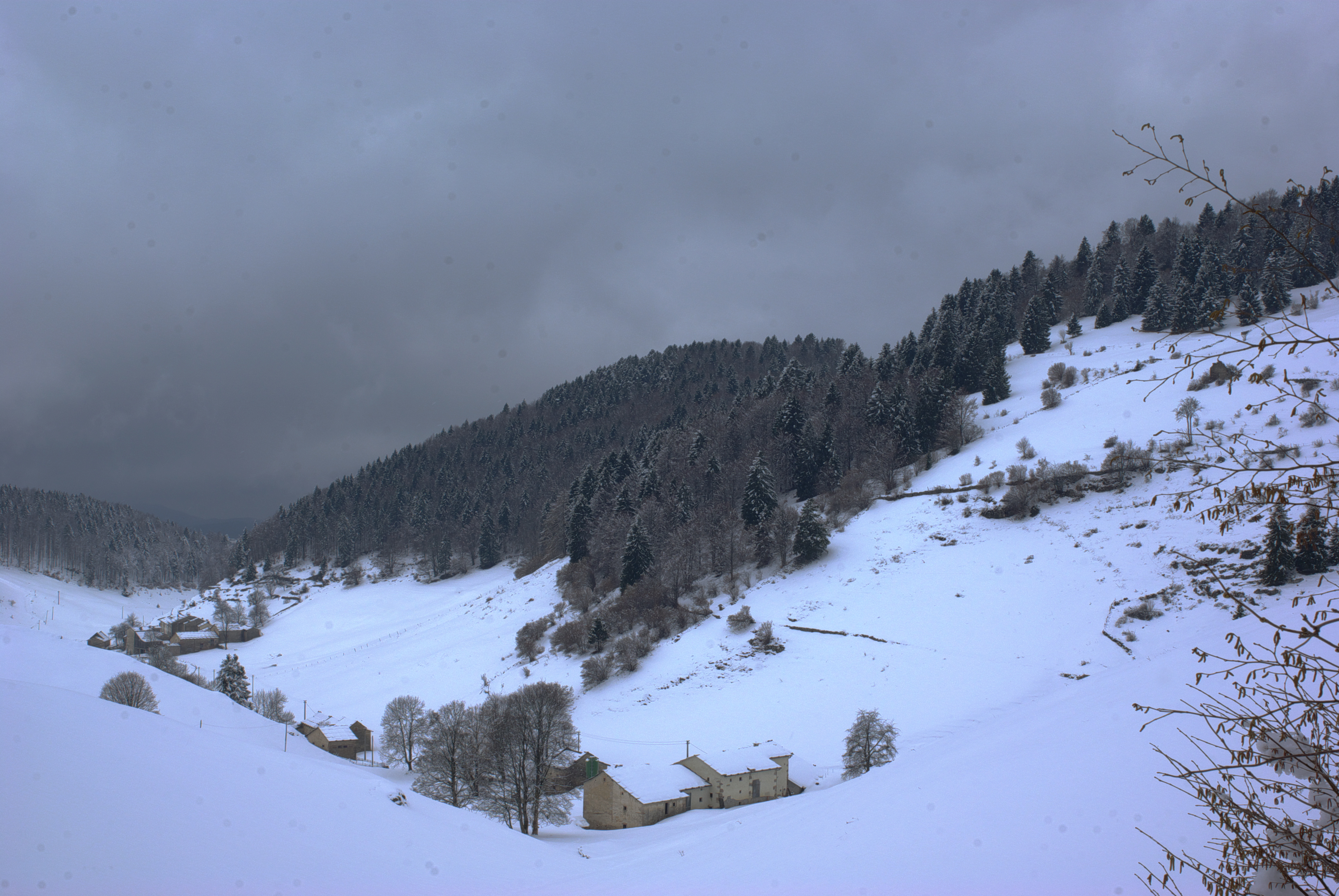
Snowy pasture at Bosco Chiesanuova in Italy
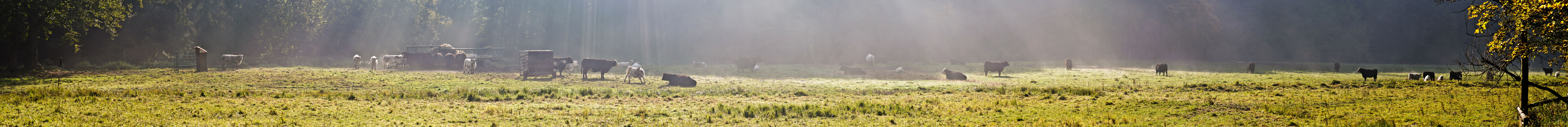
Grazing cattle on a pasture near Hradec nad Moravicí in the Czech Republic

== See also ==
- Transhumance
