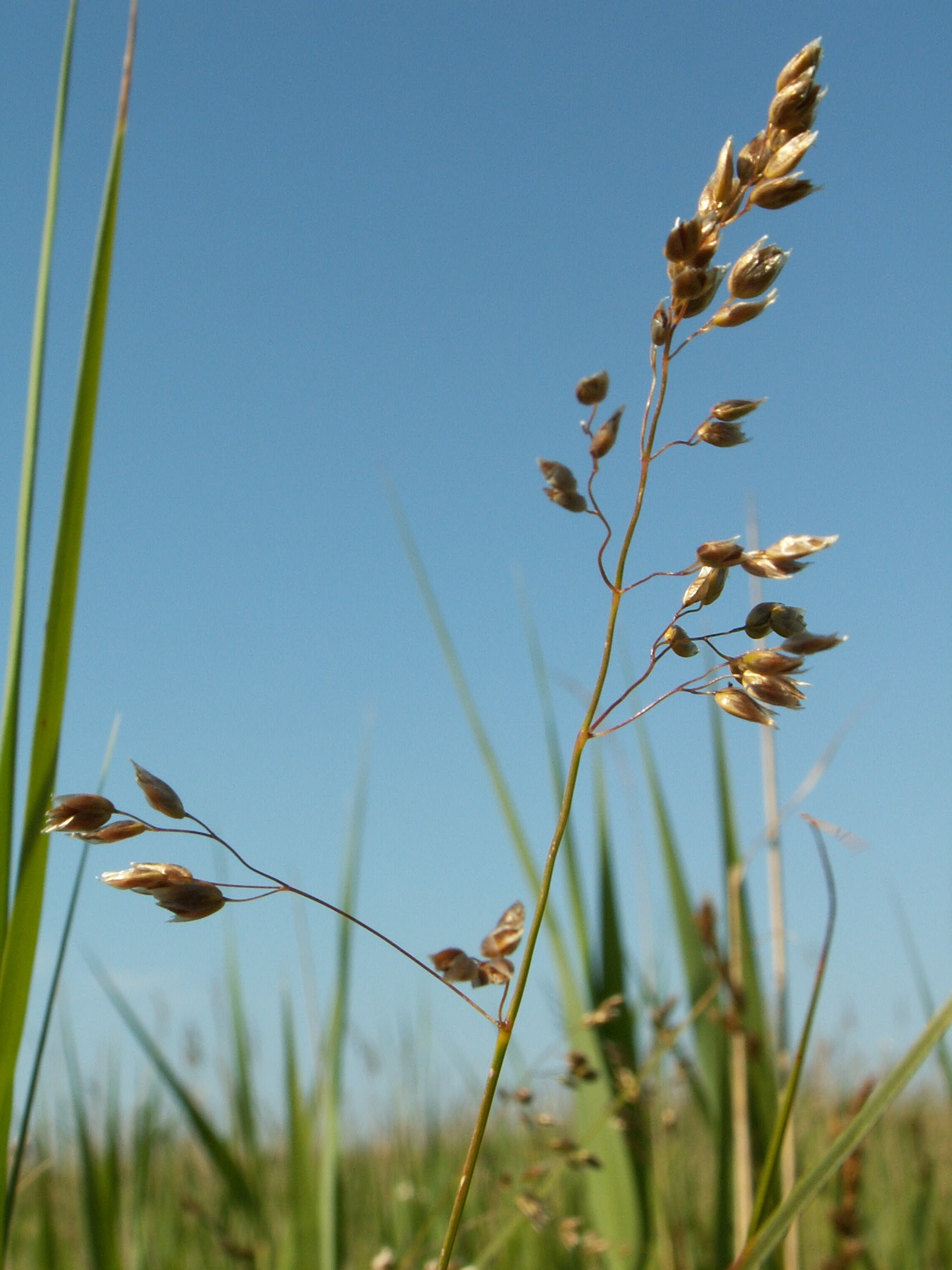
- Hierochloe odorata

Scientific classification
- Kingdom: Plantae
- Clade: Tracheophytes
- Clade: Angiosperms
- Clade: Monocots
- Clade: Commelinids
- Order: Poales
- Family: Poaceae
- Genus: Hierochloe; R.Br.

Synonyms
- Hierochloë R.Br., alternate spelling; Dimesia Raf.; Disarrenum Labill.; Disarrhenum P.Beauv.; Savastana Schrank; Torresia Ruiz & Pav.

= Hierochloe =

Genus of grasses

Hierochloe is a genus of plants in the grass family known generally as sweetgrass. These are perennial rhizomatous grasses found primarily in temperate and subarctic regions of Eurasia and North America, although some species extend southwards into Australia and Latin America.

These erect green grasses are known for their sweet scent. They bear panicle inflorescences with rounded grass grain fruits.

Some authors advocate merging the two genera Hierochloe and Anthoxanthum, though others disagree.

Species

- Hierochloe alpina - Russia, Scandinavia, Mongolia, Kazakhstan, Manchuria, Korea, Japan, Canada, Greenland, Alaska, northern United States (ME NH VT NY MN)
- Hierochloe australis - northern + central Europe
- Hierochloe brunonis - New Zealand (South I + Antipodean Is)
- Hierochloe cuprea - New Zealand (South I + North I)
- Hierochloe davidsei - Colombia, Venezuela, Costa Rica
- Hierochloe equiseta - New Zealand South I)
- Hierochloe flexuosa - Nepal, Sikkim, Bhutan, Arunachal Pradesh
- Hierochloe fraseri - Tasmania
- Hierochloe fusca - New Zealand (South I + North I, Chatham Is, Antipodean Is)
- Hierochloe glabra - China incl Tibet; Korea, Japan, Mongolia, Asiatic Russia, Kazakhstan
- Hierochloe gunckelii - Chile, Argentina
- Hierochloe helenae - Primorye
- Hierochloe juncifolia - Chile, Argentina
- Hierochloe khasiana - Assam
- Hierochloe laxa - Afghanistan, northern Pakistan, Himachal Pradesh, Jammu & Kashmir, Himachal Pradesh, Nepal, Gansu, Sichuan
- Hierochloe mexicana - Mexico, Guatemala, Venezuela
- Hierochloe novae-zelandiae - New Zealand (South I + North I)
- Hierochloe odorata - Eurasia, North America
- Hierochloe pauciflora - Russia, Canada, Alaska
- Hierochloe pluriflora - Japan
- Hierochloe potaninii - Gansu, Sichuan
- Hierochloe pusilla - Chile, Argentina
- Hierochloe quebrada - Peru
- Hierochloe rariflora - Australia
- Hierochloe recurvata - New Zealand (South I + North I)
- Hierochloe redolens - Australia, New Zealand, New Guinea, South America, Falkland Is
- Hierochloe repens - Russia, Kazakhstan, Ukraine, Belarus, Bulgaria, Romania, Czech Rep, Hungary, Austria
- Hierochloe spicata - southern Chile
- Hierochloe submutica - Australia
- Hierochloe tibetica - Tibet
- Hierochloe utriculata - Chile, Argentina
- Hierochloe wendelboi - Pakistan
- Hierochloe × zinserlingii - Ural Mountains of Russia

formerly included

numerous species now regarded as better suited to other genera: Anthoxanthum Centotheca Holcus
