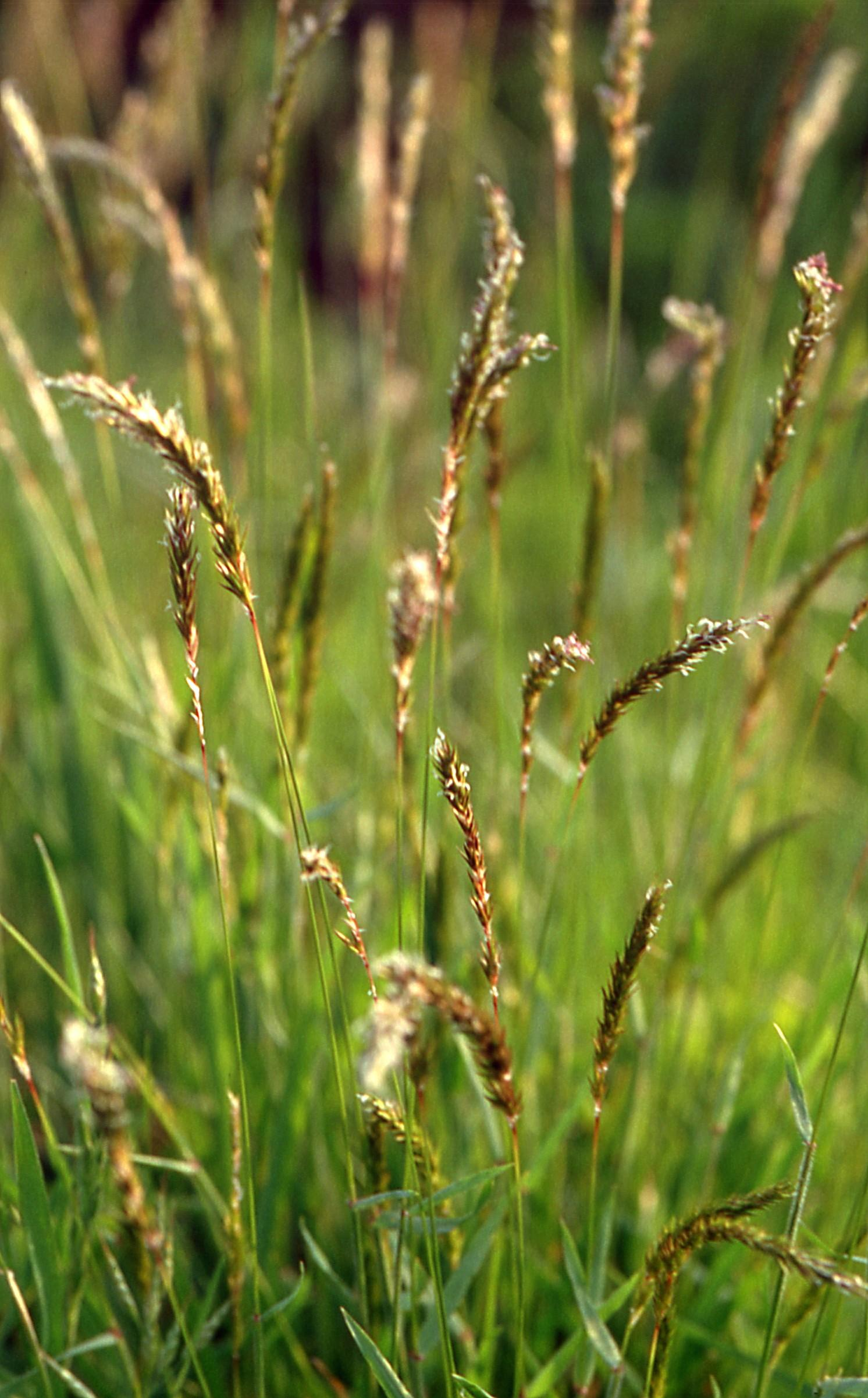

Scientific classification
- Kingdom: Plantae
- Clade: Tracheophytes
- Clade: Angiosperms
- Clade: Monocots
- Clade: Commelinids
- Order: Poales
- Family: Poaceae
- Subfamily: Pooideae
- Genus: Anthoxanthum
- Species: A. odoratum

Binomial name
- Anthoxanthum odoratum L.

= Anthoxanthum odoratum =

Species of grass

Anthoxanthum odoratum is a short-lived perennial grass, commonly known as sweet vernal grass, that is native to acidic grassland in Eurasia and northern Africa. It is grown as a lawn grass and a houseplant, due to its sweet scent, and can also be found on unimproved pastures and meadows. The specific epithet odoratum is Latin for 'odorous'.

== Description ==
Anthoxanthum odaoratum is a short-lived perennial grass that grows in tufts with stems up to 70 cm (28 in) tall. The leaves are short and broad, 3–5 mm (0.12–0.20 in) wide, and glabrous to loosely hairy. It flowers in late spring and early summer, i.e. quite early in the season, with flower spikes of 4–6 centimetres (1.6–2.4 in) long and crowded spikelets of 6–10 mm (0.24–0.39 in), oblong shaped, which can be quite dark when young. The lower lemmas have projecting awns. The ligules are quite long, up to 5 mm (0.20 in), blunt, with hairy fringes around the side.

The scent is particularly strong when dried, and is due to coumarin, a glycoside, and benzoic acid – it smells like fresh hay with a hint of vanilla. The seed head is bright yellow in color.

Anthoxanthum odoratum is experiencing parapatric speciation in areas of mine contamination.

== Distribution ==
Anthoxanthum odoratum is native to Europe and temperate parts of Asia, but is widely introduced and naturalised so that distribution is now Circumpolar Wide-temperate. It is ubiquitous at the 10 km square level in Britain.

== Cultivation ==
It is grown by scattering seed on tilled ground in the spring through fall, germinating in 4 to 5 days. It prefers sandy loam and acidic conditions (a low pH). As an agricultural grass it has a low yield, but can grow on land too acidic for other grasses.

== Gallery ==
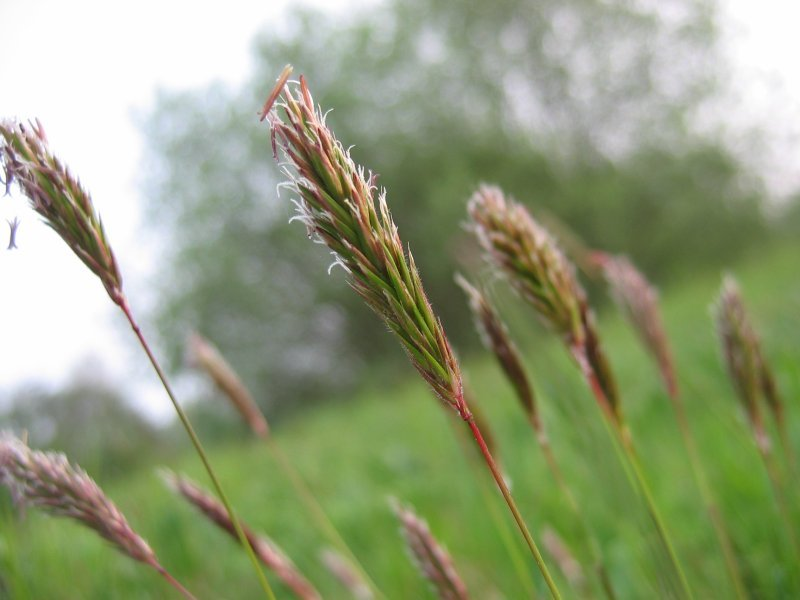

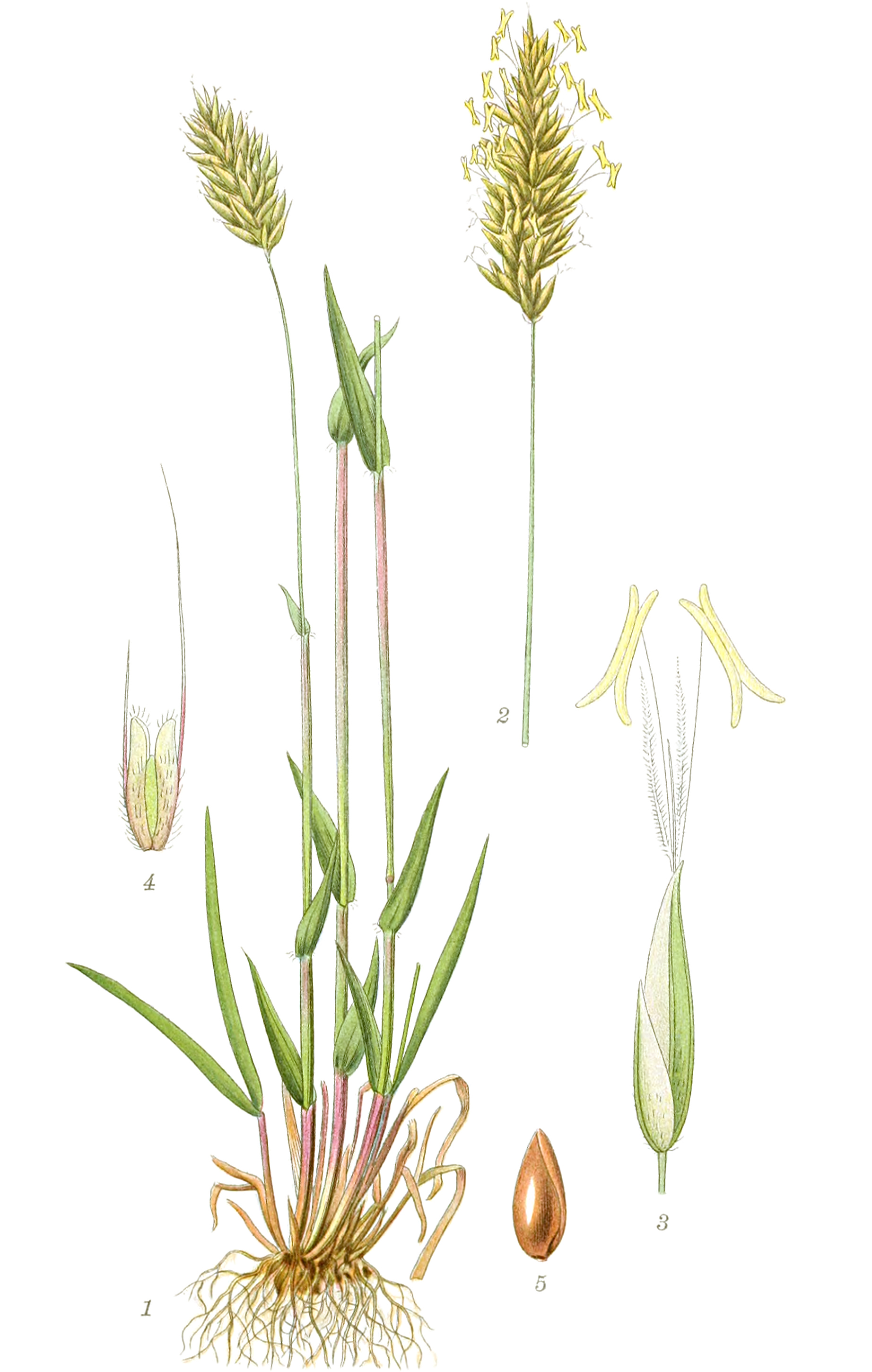

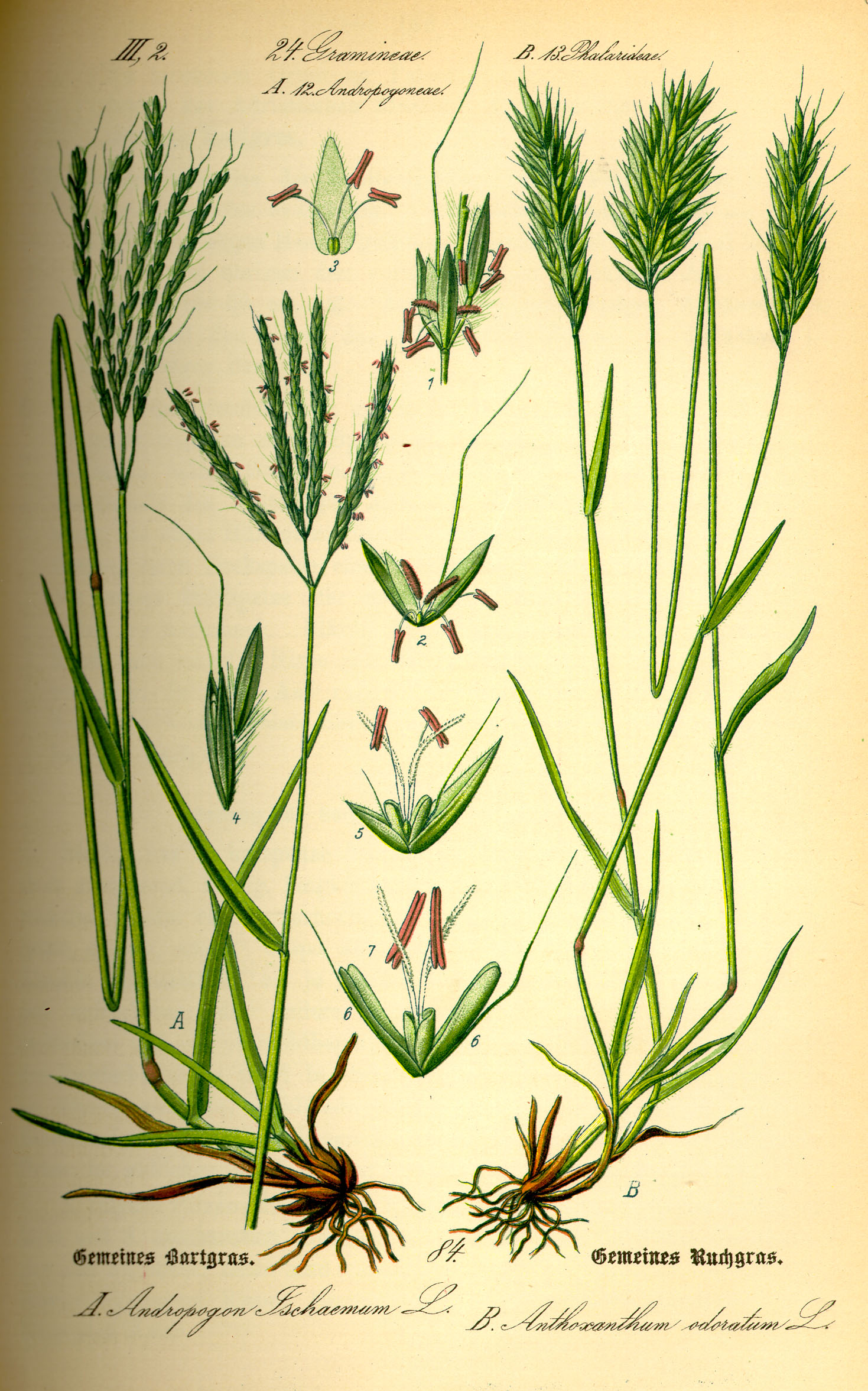

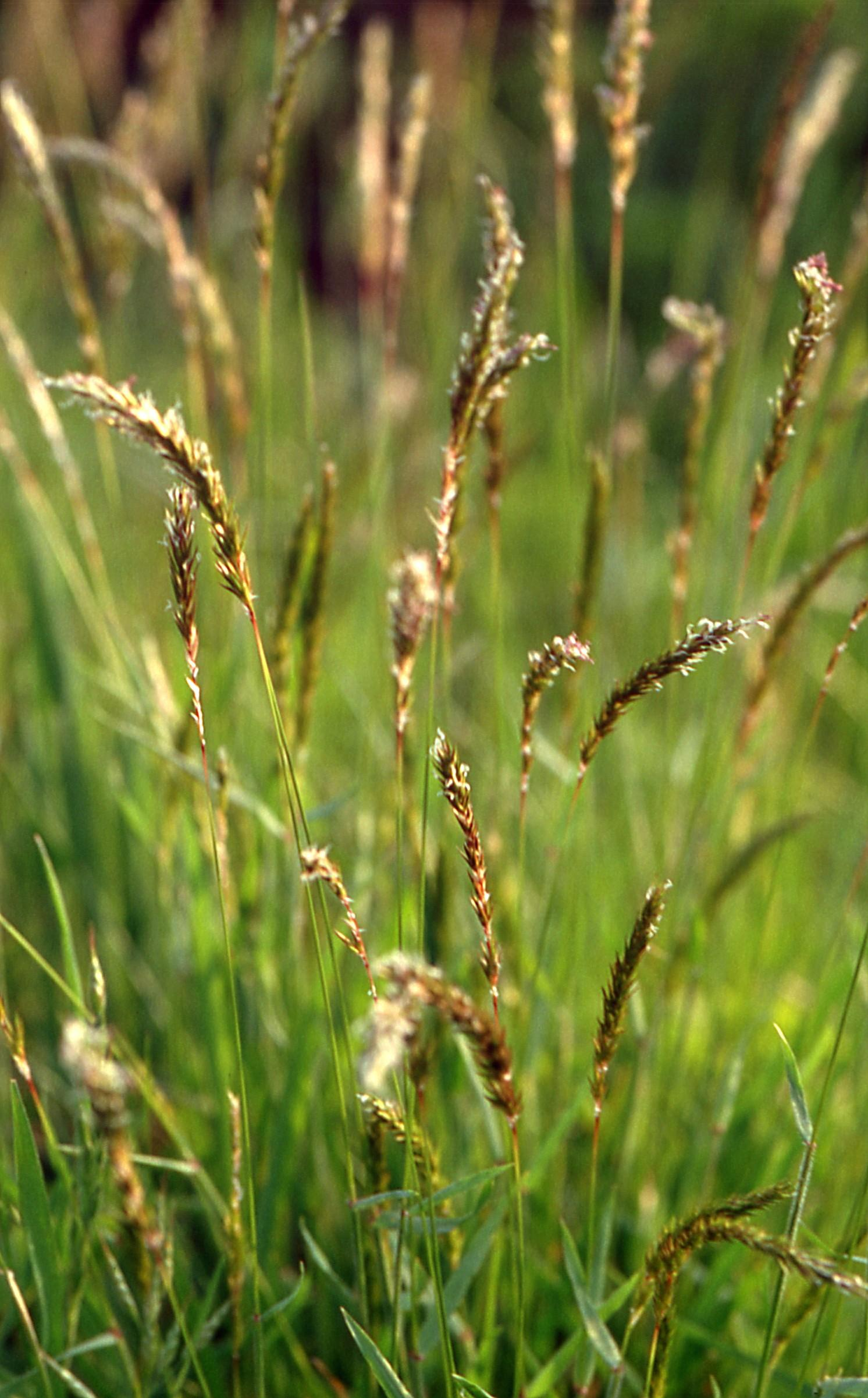

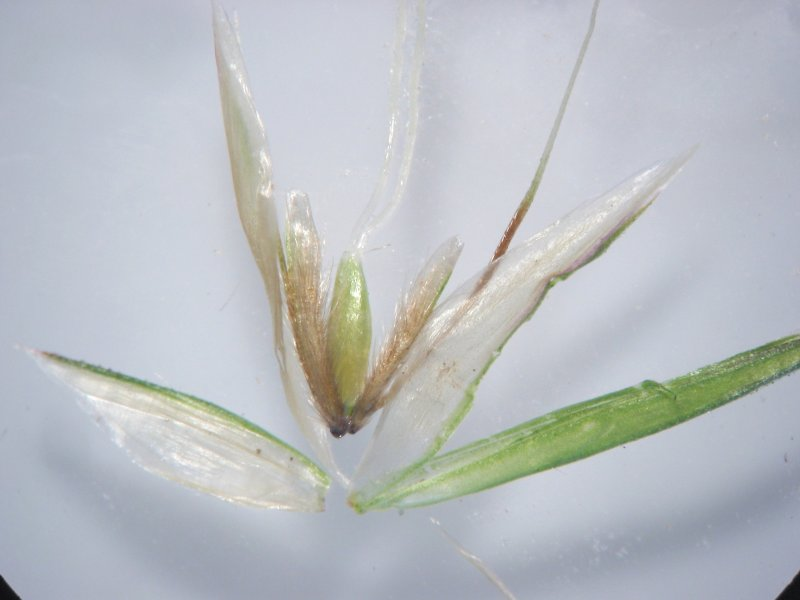

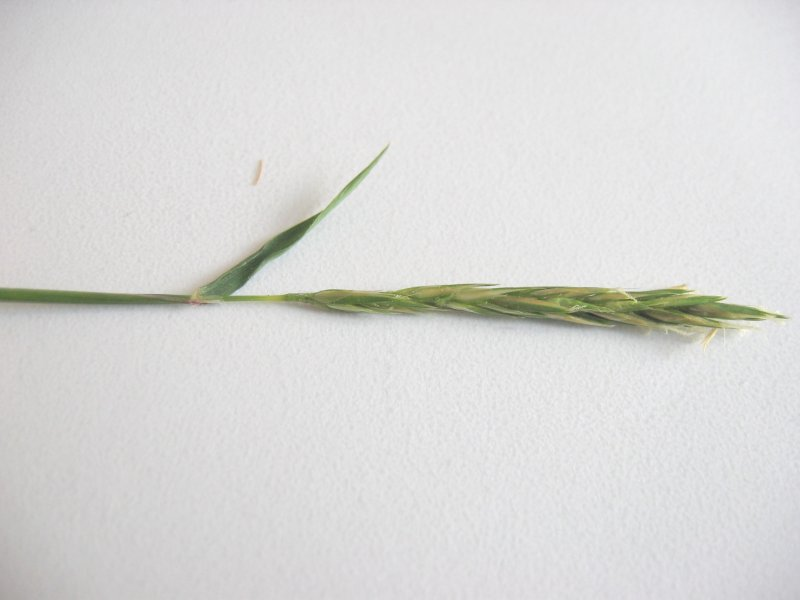

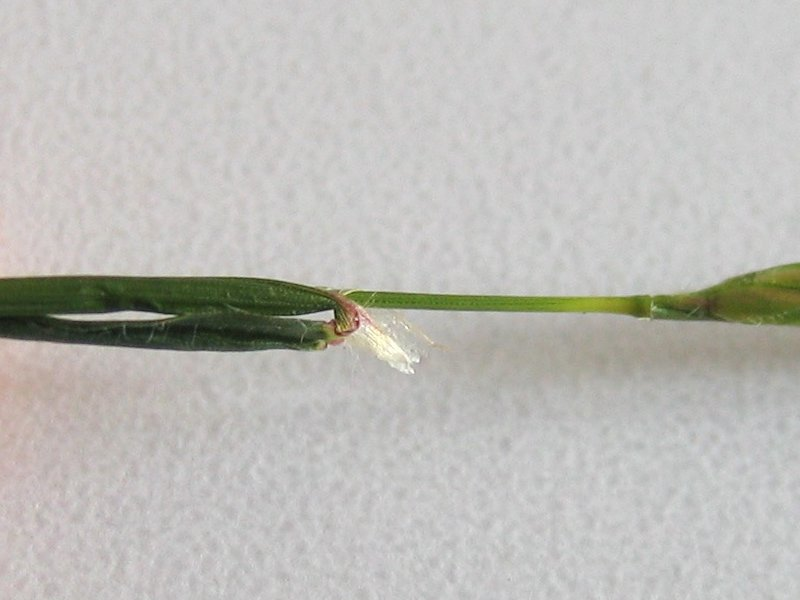

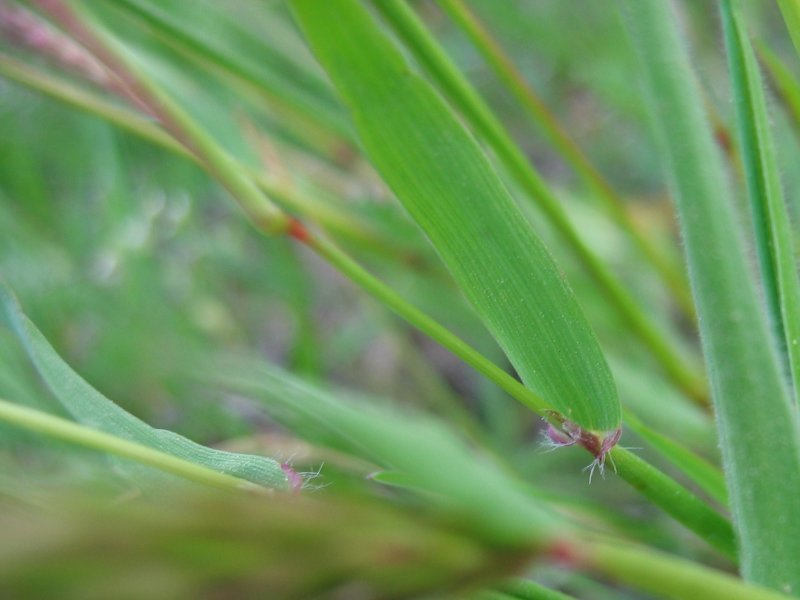

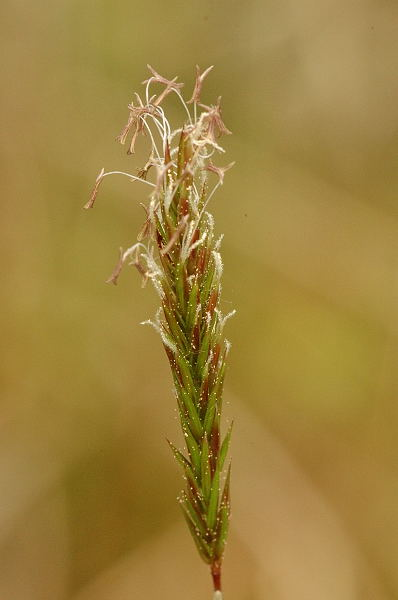

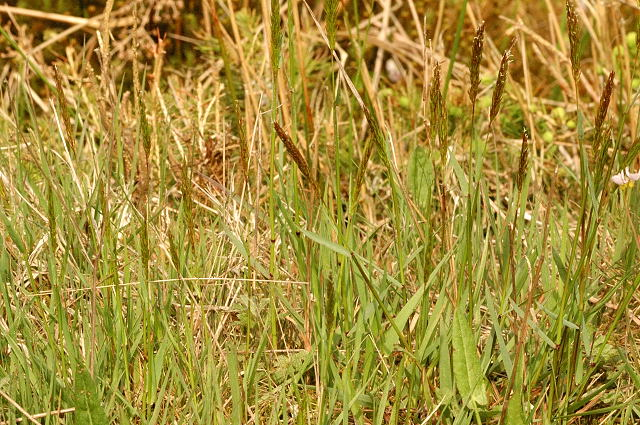

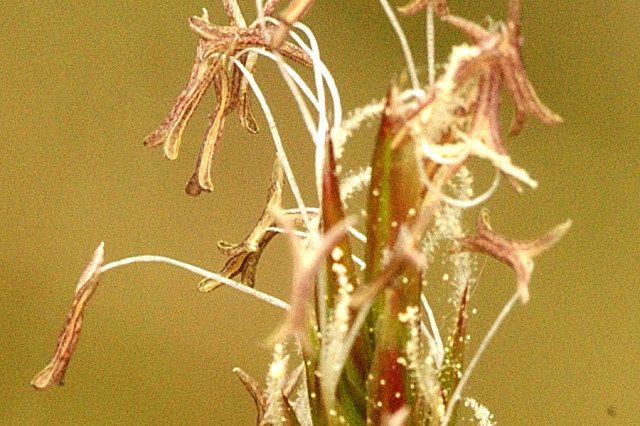
