= Holcus annuus =

Scientific classification
- Kingdom: Plantae
- Clade: Tracheophytes
- Clade: Angiosperms
- Clade: Monocots
- Clade: Commelinids
- Order: Poales
- Family: Poaceae
- Subfamily: Pooideae
- Genus: Holcus
- Species: H. annuus

Binomial name
- Holcus annuus Salzm. ex C.A.Mey.

Synonyms
- Holcus setosus Trin.; Holcus ventricosus Fisch. ex Trin.

Species of plant

Holcus annuus, called annual fog, is a species of flowering plant in the grass family Poaceae, native to the Mediterranean region and the Transcaucasus, and introduced to southeastern Australia. In spite of its scientific and common names, it is a perennial.
