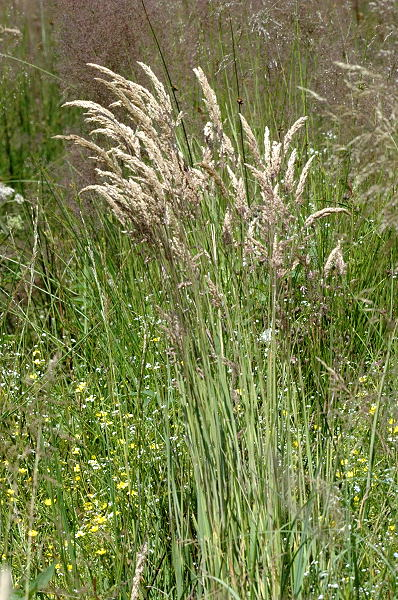

Scientific classification
- Kingdom: Plantae
- Clade: Tracheophytes
- Clade: Angiosperms
- Clade: Monocots
- Clade: Commelinids
- Order: Poales
- Family: Poaceae
- Subfamily: Pooideae
- Genus: Holcus
- Species: H. mollis

Binomial name
- Holcus mollis L.

= Holcus mollis =

Species of grass

Holcus mollis, known as creeping soft grass or creeping velvet grass, is a species of flowering plant in the grass family Poaceae. It is native to Europe and north Africa.

== Description ==
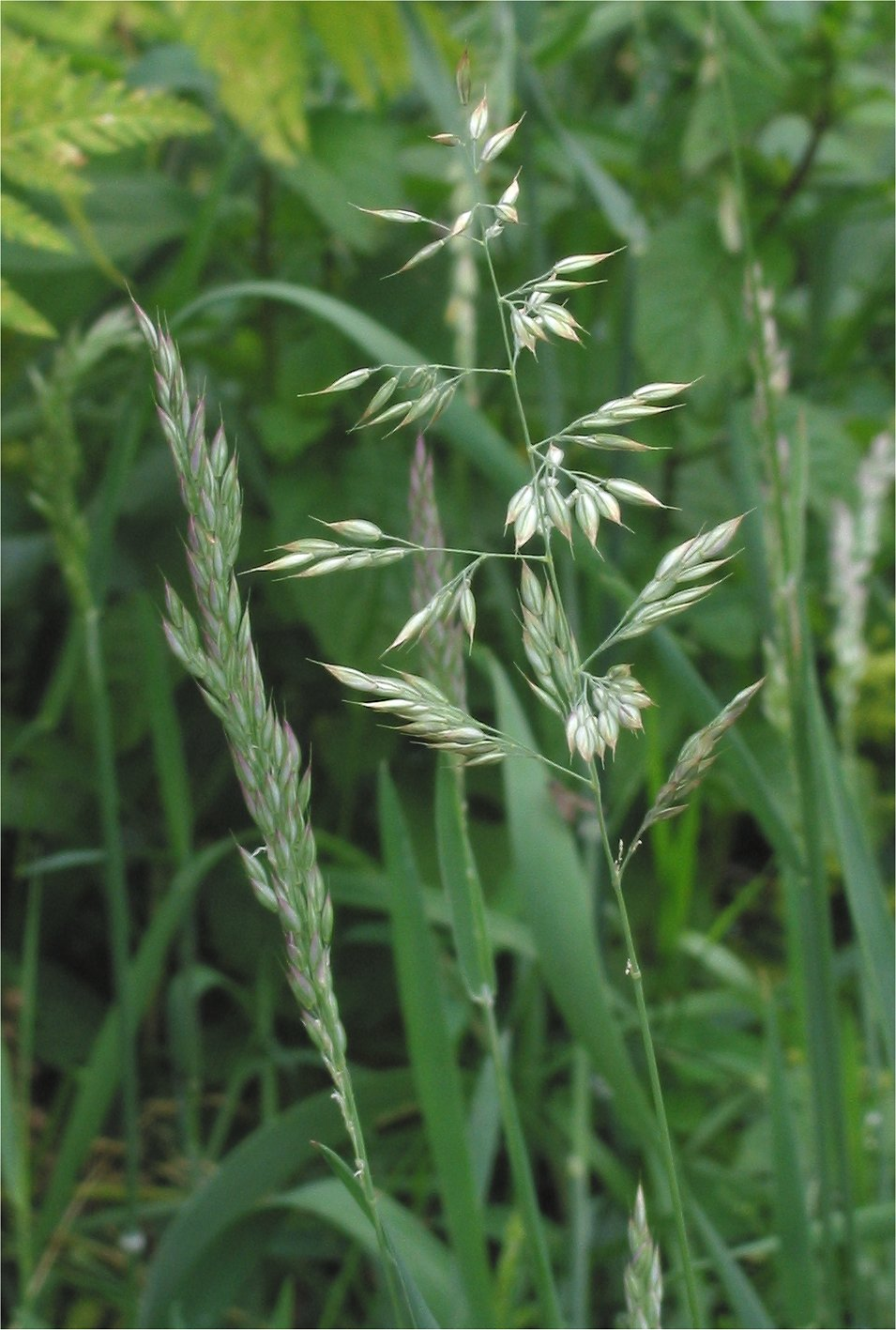
Young (left) and mature inflorescences

Holcus mollis is a rhizomatous perennial grass found in woods and hedgerows, growing to 50 centimetres (20 in) tall. It has rhizomes that occur around 5 cm (2.0 in) deep in soil or sometimes deeper. Rhizome growth occurs in the period May to November but is fastest from mid-June to mid-July. The rhizomes have many dormant buds that do not develop unless the rhizomes are disturbed and then fresh aerial shoots may arise from the broken fragments. It flowers from June to July.

The main distinguishing characteristics from H. lanatus are the presence of rhizomes, and the bearded nodes or 'hairy knees' on the culm.

== Habitat ==
Holcus mollis is favoured by conditions in woodland clearings and at the early stages of coppicing. Growth and flowering are restricted as the tree canopy develops. It is often a relict of former woodland vegetation, surviving in open grassland and grassy heaths after woodland clearance despite being a shade lover. It is found mostly on moist, freely-drained acid soils, normally light to medium texture and high in organic matter; it is absent from areas of calcareous or base rich soil, and often grows with bracken.

== Insect foodplant ==
The caterpillars of some Lepidoptera use it as a food plant, e.g. the Essex skipper (Thymelicus lineola).

== Status as a weed ==
In a survey of weeds in conventional cereals in central southern England in 1982, it was found in 1% of winter barley but not at all in winter wheat or spring barley.

Each small piece of rhizome is capable of developing into a new plant. Research shows that within 6–8 inches (150–200 mm) of the surface, 1 square foot (0.093 m^{2}) of rhizome infested soil may contain up to 110 feet (34 m) of rhizome, the weight of roots and rhizomes being estimated at 7.5 tons per acre.

== Varieties and hybridisation ==
A pentaploid variant of H. mollis is common in Britain; it is sterile but spreads vegetatively. H. mollis var. variegatus has striped green and white leaves; it is sometimes cultivated.

A male sterile hybrid with Holcus lanatus exists with 2n = 21 chromosomes. Hybrids tend to resemble H. lanatus in their morphology.
