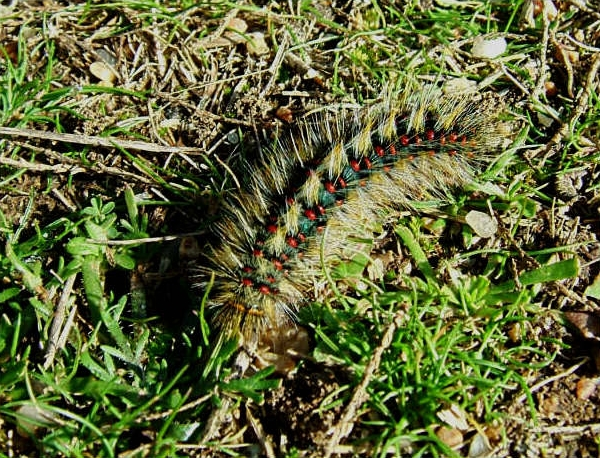
- Chondrostega vandalicia

Scientific classification
- Kingdom: Animalia
- Phylum: Arthropoda
- Class: Insecta
- Order: Lepidoptera
- Family: Lasiocampidae
- Genus: Chondrostega; Lederer, 1858

Synonyms
- Eustaudingeria Dyar, 1988

= Chondrostega =

Genus of moths

Chondrostega is a genus of moths in the family Lasiocampidae. The genus was erected by Julius Lederer in 1858.

== Species ==
- Chondrostega aurivillii Püngeler, 1902
- Chondrostega barbaresques
- Chondrostega brunneicornis Wiltshire, 1944
- Chondrostega constantina
- Chondrostega constantina Aurivillius, 1894 Tunisia, Algeria, Morocco
- Chondrostega darius Wiltshire, 1952
- Chondrostega fasciana Staudinger, [1892]
- Chondrostega feisali
- Chondrostega goetschmanni Sterz, 1915
- Chondrostega hyrcana Staudinger, 1871 Turkmenia, Uzbekistan, Tajikistan
- Chondrostega intacta
- Chondrostega longespinata Aurivillius, 1894
- Chondrostega maghrebica
- Chondrostega misuratana
- Chondrostega murina Aurivillus, 1927
- Chondrostega nigrifusa
- Chondrostega osthelderi Püngeler, 1925 Asia Minor
- Chondrostega palaestrana Staudinger, [1892]
- Chondrostega pastrana Lederer, 1858 Asia Minor
- Chondrostega pauli
- Chondrostega powelli
- Chondrostega pujoli
- Chondrostega subfasciata Klug, 1830
- Chondrostega tingitana Powell, 1916 Morocco
- Chondrostega vandalicia (Millière, 1865)
