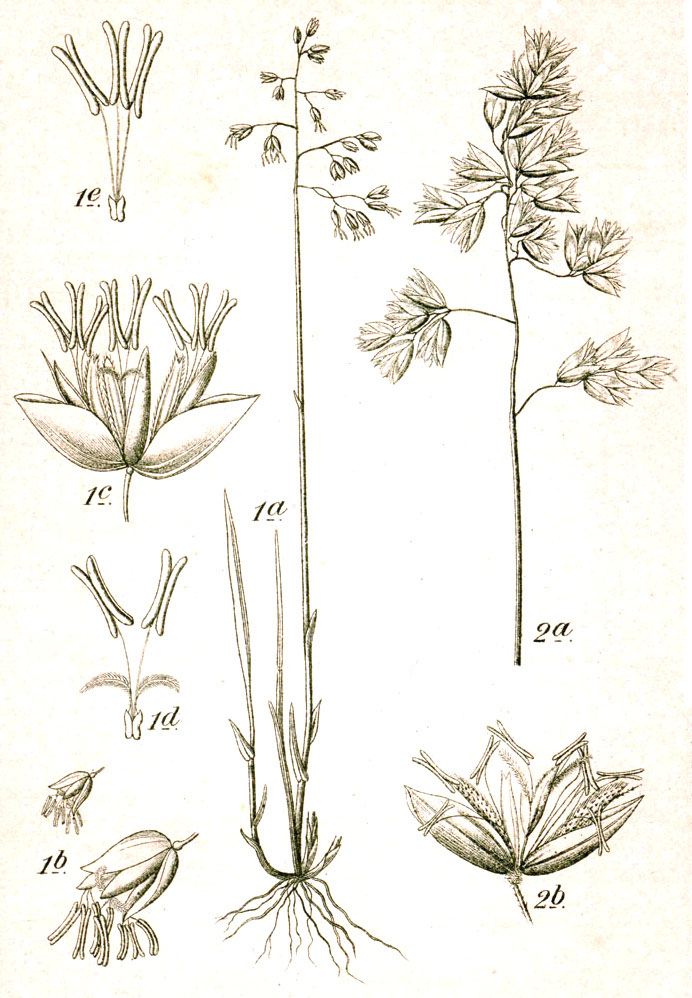
- Illustrated in 2A-B

Scientific classification
- Kingdom: Plantae
- Clade: Tracheophytes
- Clade: Angiosperms
- Clade: Monocots
- Clade: Commelinids
- Order: Poales
- Family: Poaceae
- Genus: Hierochloe
- Species: H. australis

Binomial name
- Hierochloe australis (Schrad.) Roem. & Schult.

= Hierochloe australis =

Species of grass

Hierochloe australis is a species of flowering plant belonging to the family Poaceae.

Synonyms:

- Anthoxanthum australe (Schrad.) Veldkamp
- Avena odorata var. aristata Lam. & DC.
- Hierochloe aristata Wulfen
- Hierochloe odorata var. aristata (Lam. & DC.) Fiori
- Holcus australis Schrad.
