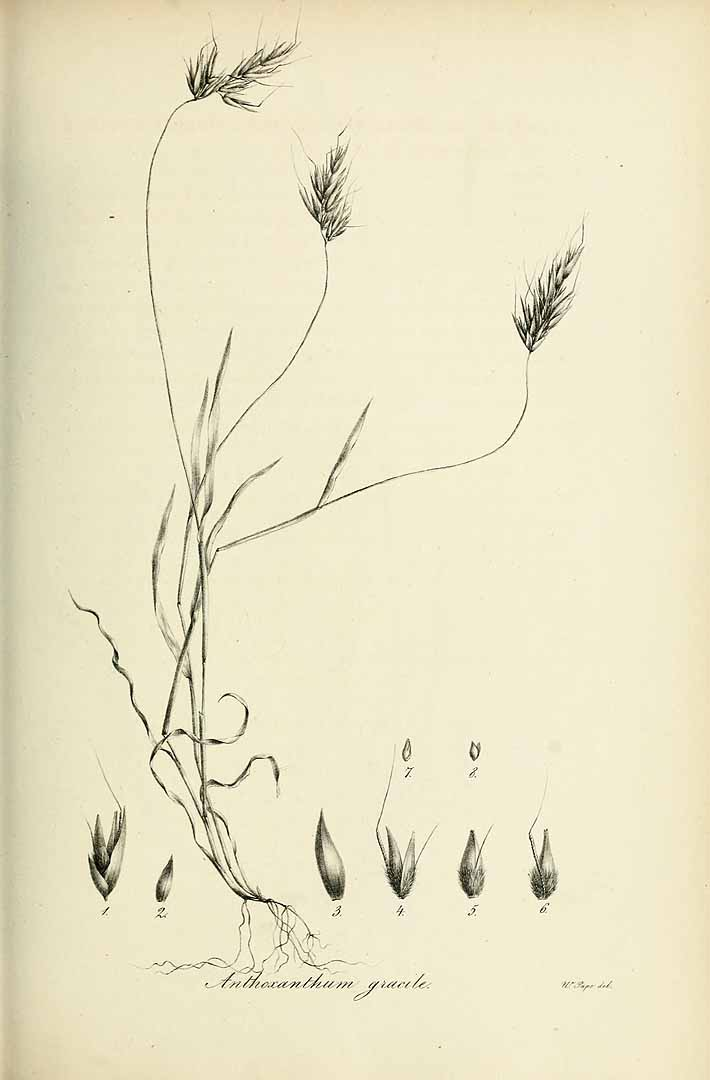

Scientific classification
- Kingdom: Plantae
- Clade: Tracheophytes
- Clade: Angiosperms
- Clade: Monocots
- Clade: Commelinids
- Order: Poales
- Family: Poaceae
- Subfamily: Pooideae
- Genus: Anthoxanthum
- Species: A. gracile

Binomial name
- Anthoxanthum gracile Biv.

= Anthoxanthum gracile =

Species of grass

aAnthoxanthum gracile is an ornamental plant.
