= Rough pasture =

Non-intensive grazing pasture

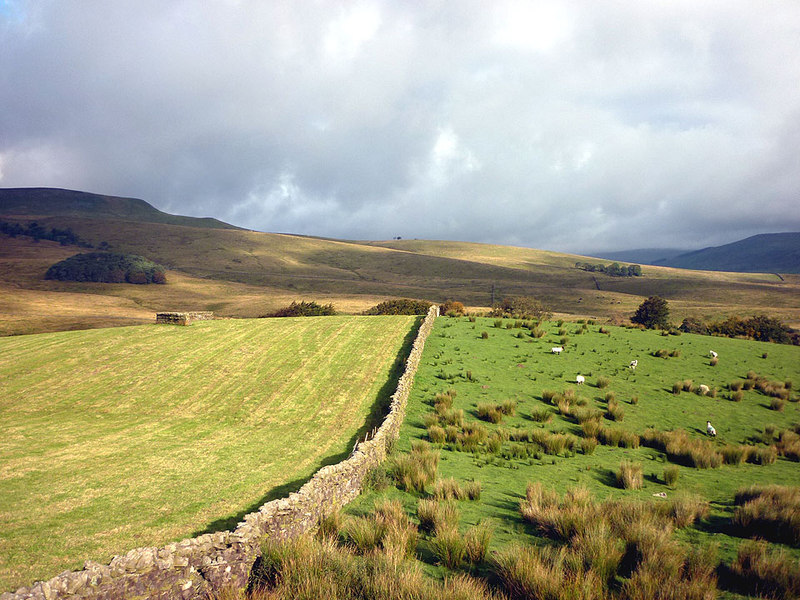
Not-so-rough pasture (left) and rough pasture (right) above Widdale.

Rough pasture or rough grazing is non-intensive grazing pasture, commonly found on poor soils, especially in hilly areas, throughout the world.

In agricultural environment, it is an area outside of a field, a meadow or an area without any or with few trees. This area is not fertilized nor is fodder taken there. Rough pastures are often rich biomes with great biodiversity, sometimes with endangered species because they offer many different kinds of habitats for many different plant, mushroom, insect and bird species. If near fields, they can be beneficial for cultivation when pollinators and beneficial insects visit a field from rough pastures.

Grazing these pastures is beneficial for animals as they get to practice natural behaviours for their species. Different shapes in the landscape give them a more diverse range of exercise and diverse vegetation can be beneficial for the immune system of the animals.
