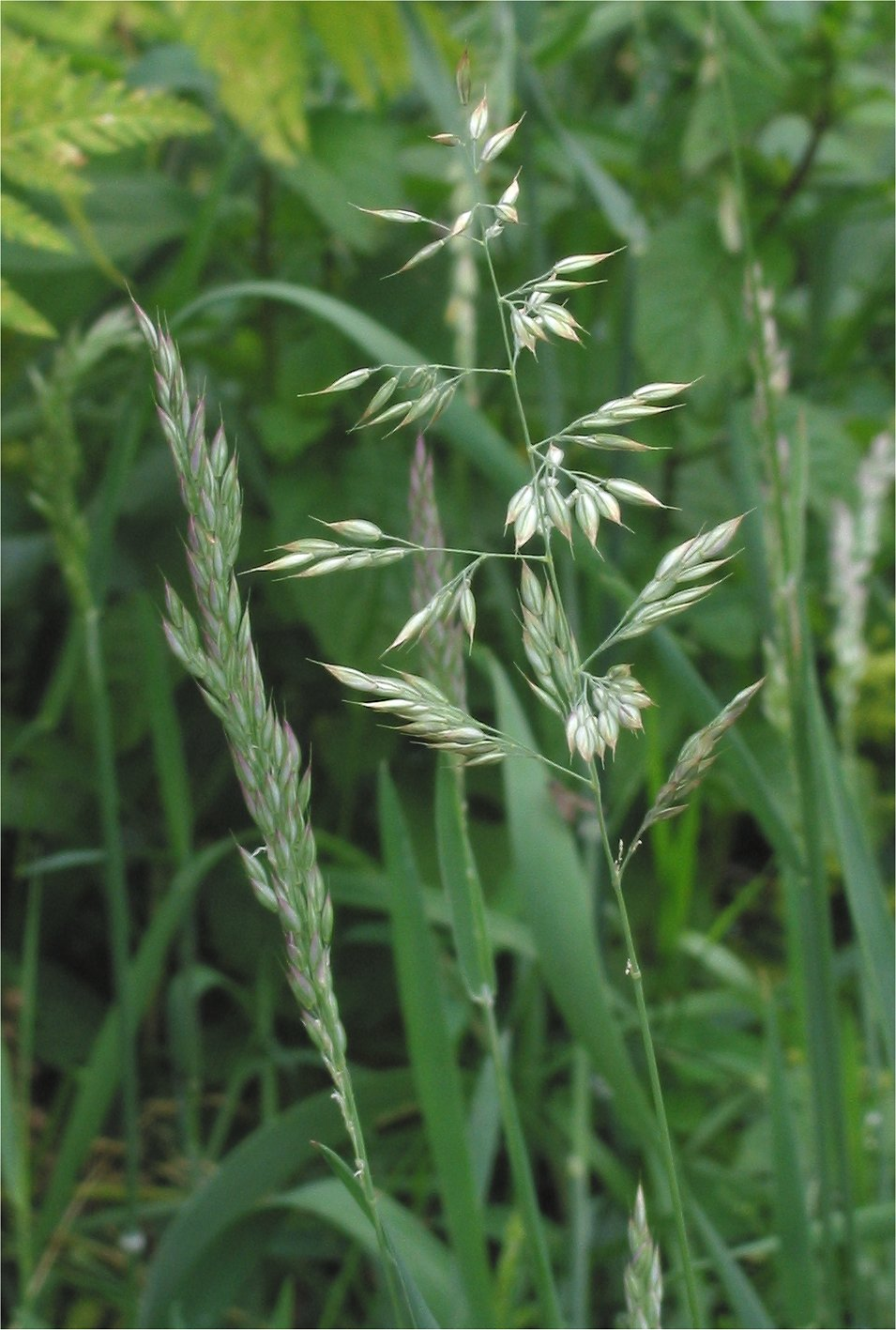
- Holcus mollis

Scientific classification
- Kingdom: Plantae
- Clade: Embryophytes
- Clade: Tracheophytes
- Clade: Spermatophytes
- Clade: Angiosperms
- Clade: Monocots
- Clade: Commelinids
- Order: Poales
- Family: Poaceae
- Subfamily: Pooideae
- Supertribe: Poodae
- Tribe: Poeae
- Subtribe: Holcinae
- Genus: Holcus; L.

Type species
- Holcus lanatus L.

Synonyms
- Arthrochloa R.Br.; Ginannia Bubani; Homalachne (Benth. & Hook.f.) Kuntze; Homoiachne Pilg.; Notholcus Nash ex Hitchc.; Nothoholcus Nash; Sorgum Adans., rejected name

= Holcus =

Soft-grass

Genus of grasses

Holcus (soft-grass or velvetgrass) is a genus of African and Eurasian plants in the oat tribe within the grass family.

Holcus species are used as food plants by the larvae of some Lepidoptera species including Coleophora lixella.

Species

- Holcus annuus - Mediterranean and nearby areas from Portugal + Morocco to Caucasus
- Holcus azoricus - Azores - possibly a hybrid of H. lanatus and H. rigidus
- Holcus caespitosus - Sierra Nevada in southern Spain
- Holcus gayanus - Spain, Portugal
- Holcus grandiflorus - Spain
- Holcus × hybridus - France, Germany, British Isles -- H. lanatus × H. mollis
- Holcus lanatus - Europe, Mediterranean + nearby areas from Iceland to Canary Isles to Caucasus; naturalized in North + South America, Australia, New Zealand, East Asia, various islands
- Holcus mollis - Algeria, Tunisia, most of Europe; naturalized in Australia, new Zealand, scattered locales in North America
- Holcus notarisii - Macedonia, Italy
- Holcus rigidus - Azores
- Holcus setiger - Cape Prov of South Africa

formerly included

Several species now regarded as better suited to other genera; Andropogon Arrhenatherum Arundinella Bothriochloa Capillipedium Centotheca Chasmanthium Chrysopogon Deschampsia Heteropogon Hierochloe Pennisetum Pentameris Pseudoraphis Rostraria Sorghum Sporobolus Ventenata
