= Sown biodiverse pasture =

Sown biodiverse pastures consist of diverse mixes of up to twenty different species or varieties of seeds, and are rich in legumes. They are more productive than natural grasslands, and are also richer in number of species. The seed mix is designed specifically for each location after soil analysis. Species in the mix is adapted to soil physical and chemical characteristics, as well as to local climate conditions, and therefore there is no single representative mix. However, some very common sown species in SBP are Trifolium subterraneum, Trifolium incarnatum, Trifolium resupinatum, Ornithopus spp., Biserrula pelecinus, annual Medicago spp., and grass species of the genera Lolium, Dactylis and Phalaris. The mixes of sown species are often enriched with seeds from spontaneous plants such as Plantago spp., Vulpia spp. and Bromus spp.. Legumes are thus very common in these mixtures and cover more than 50% of first-year SBP. As pasture settlement progresses, legumes increase and eventually dominate. Percentage of legumes in the plant cover of a mature SBP (more than 5 years) is around 25–30%. Legumes are inoculated with bacteria of the genus Rhizobium which induce nitrogen-fixing nodules in the roots of legumes. The fixated atmospheric nitrogen is then used by grasses thus making the overall system self-sufficient in terms of nitrogen.

Given the species variability, there are fewer gaps in plant cover throughout the plots (it is ensured that the species most suited for each spatial condition will thrive). The higher plant productivity of SBP implies increased atmospheric carbon capture through photosynthesis. Part of the biomass produced is stored in soils due to the high density of yearly renewed roots. Storage is in the form of non-labile soil organic carbon (SOC), which is part of the soil organic matter (SOM) pools. SOM pools are also increased by leaves’ senescence, and by animals returning undigested fibre to the soil.

Sown biodiverse pastures were developed in Portugal in the 70’s decade. They have been installed throughout some regions of the country in the past decade, as well as in some minor areas in Spain and Italy.
