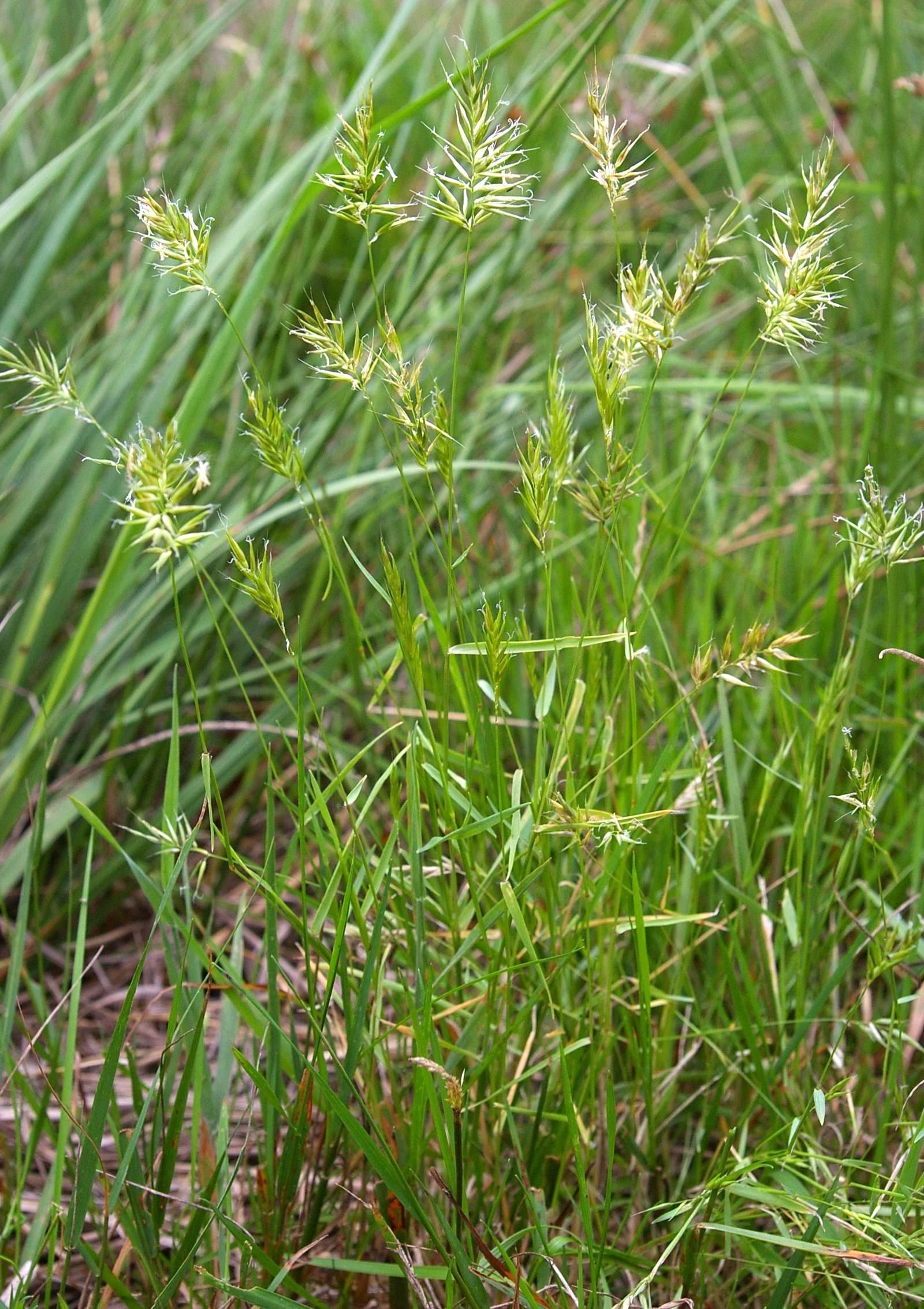

Conservation status
- Apparently Secure (NatureServe)

Scientific classification
- Kingdom: Plantae
- Clade: Embryophytes
- Clade: Tracheophytes
- Clade: Spermatophytes
- Clade: Angiosperms
- Clade: Monocots
- Clade: Commelinids
- Order: Poales
- Family: Poaceae
- Subfamily: Pooideae
- Genus: Anthoxanthum
- Species: A. aristatum

Binomial name
- Anthoxanthum aristatum Boiss.

Synonyms
- Anthoxanthum aetnense Lojac. Anthoxanthum angustifolium Planellas; Anthoxanthum aristatum subsp. puelii (Lecoq & Lamotte) P.Silva; Anthoxanthum carrenianum Parl. Anthoxanthum laxiflorum Bubani; Anthoxanthum lloydii Jord. ex Boreau; Anthoxanthum myrthense Lojac. Anthoxanthum puelii Lecoq & Lamotte

= Anthoxanthum aristatum =

Species of plant in the grass family

Anthoxanthum aristatum is a species of grass known by the common names awned vernalgrass and annual vernalgrass. It is native to North Africa and southern and western Europe as far north as the Netherlands. It is also known in other regions, including northern Europe and North America, as an introduced species. It is occasionally a minor weed of fields. It is an annual grass growing in small tufts up to about 30 centimetres (12 in) tall. The leaves are short, pointed, and somewhat hairy. The inflorescence is up to 3 centimetres (1.2 in) long and 1 centimetre (0.4 in) wide, flat and hairy with spikelets a few millimeters long.
