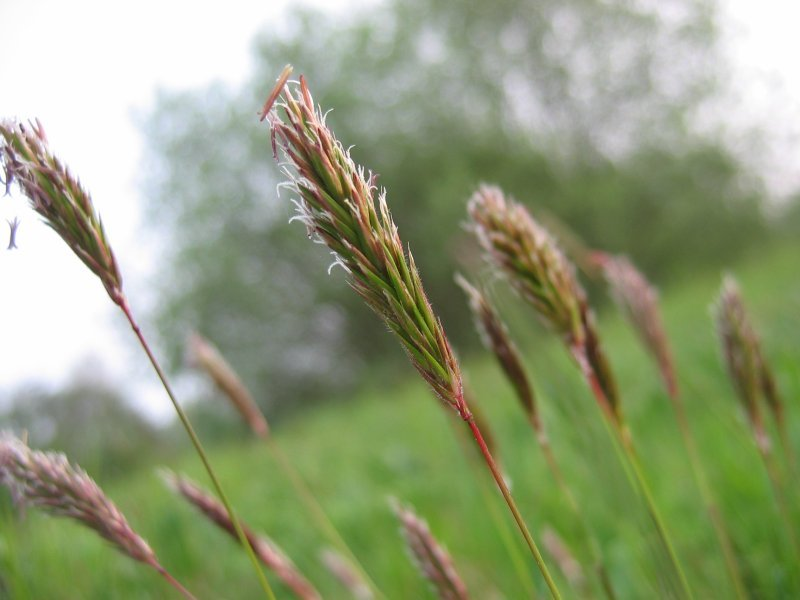
- Anthoxanthum odoratum

Scientific classification
- Kingdom: Plantae
- Clade: Tracheophytes
- Clade: Angiosperms
- Clade: Monocots
- Clade: Commelinids
- Order: Poales
- Family: Poaceae
- Subfamily: Pooideae
- Supertribe: Poodae
- Tribe: Poeae
- Subtribe: Anthoxanthinae; A.Gray
- Genus: Anthoxanthum; L.

Type species
- Anthoxanthum odoratum L.

Synonyms
- Ataxia R.Br.; Flavia Heist. ex Fabr.; Xanthonanthos St.-Lag.

= Anthoxanthum =

Genus of grasses

Anthoxanthum (Latinised Greek for "yellow blossom"), commonly known as hornworts, vernal grasses, or vernalgrasses, is a genus of plants in the grass family. The generic name means 'yellow flower' in Botanical Latin, referring to the colour of the mature spikelets.

The members of Anthoxanthum are widespread in temperate and subtropical parts of Africa and Eurasia, with a few species in tropical mountains. Some species have become naturalized in Australia, New Zealand, and the Americas. Anthoxanthum odoratum is a common species of acidic grassland and bogs in northern Europe. All the species reportedly contain the compound coumarin, used medicinally in many countries.

The genus Hierochloe is included in Anthoxanthum by some recent authors. Others, however, continue to treat them as separate genera, and we provisionally treat them as such here pending further research.

Species

- Anthoxanthum aethiopicum - Ethiopia
- Anthoxanthum amarum - Spain, Portugal
- Anthoxanthum aristatum - Mediterranean and neighboring areas from Madeira and the Canary Islands to the Aegean
- Anthoxanthum borii - India
- Anthoxanthum dregeanum - Cape Province of South Africa
- Anthoxanthum ecklonii- South Africa, Lesotho, Malawi
- Anthoxanthum gracile - Mediterranean from Morocco to the Aegean
- Anthoxanthum hookeri - Guizhou, Sichuan, Tibet, Yunnan, Bhutan, Nepal, Sikkim, Assam, Arunachal Pradesh, Myanmar
- Anthoxanthum horsfieldii - Southeast Asia, New Guinea, Assam, Taiwan, Guizhou
- Anthoxanthum japonicum - Honshu
- Anthoxanthum madagascariense - Madagascar
- Anthoxanthum monticola - Russia, Scandinavia, Mongolia, Kazakhstan, Manchuria, Korea, Japan, Canada, Greenland, Alaska, northern United States (ME NH VT NY MN)
- Anthoxanthum nivale - mountains of central Africa (Zaïre, Rwanda, Uganda, Kenya, Tanzania)
- Anthoxanthum occidentale - Washington, Oregon, California
- Anthoxanthum odoratum - widespread from Iceland to the Canary Islands to Mongolia; naturalized in North and South America, South Africa, Japan, East Asia, and various islands
- Anthoxanthum ovatum - Mediterranean from Spain to the Aegean
- Anthoxanthum pallidum - Sichuan, Yunnan
- Anthoxanthum redolens - Australia, New Guinea, New Zealand, and South America
- Anthoxanthum sikkimense - Nepal, Yunnan, Sikkim, Bhutan, Arunachal Pradesh
- Anthoxanthum tongo - Cape Province of South Africa

formerly included

numerous species now considered better suited to other genera. Most important is Hierochloe; others include Centotheca Crypsis Dichelachne Dimeria Festuca Perotis Saccharum

== See also ==
- List of Poaceae genera
