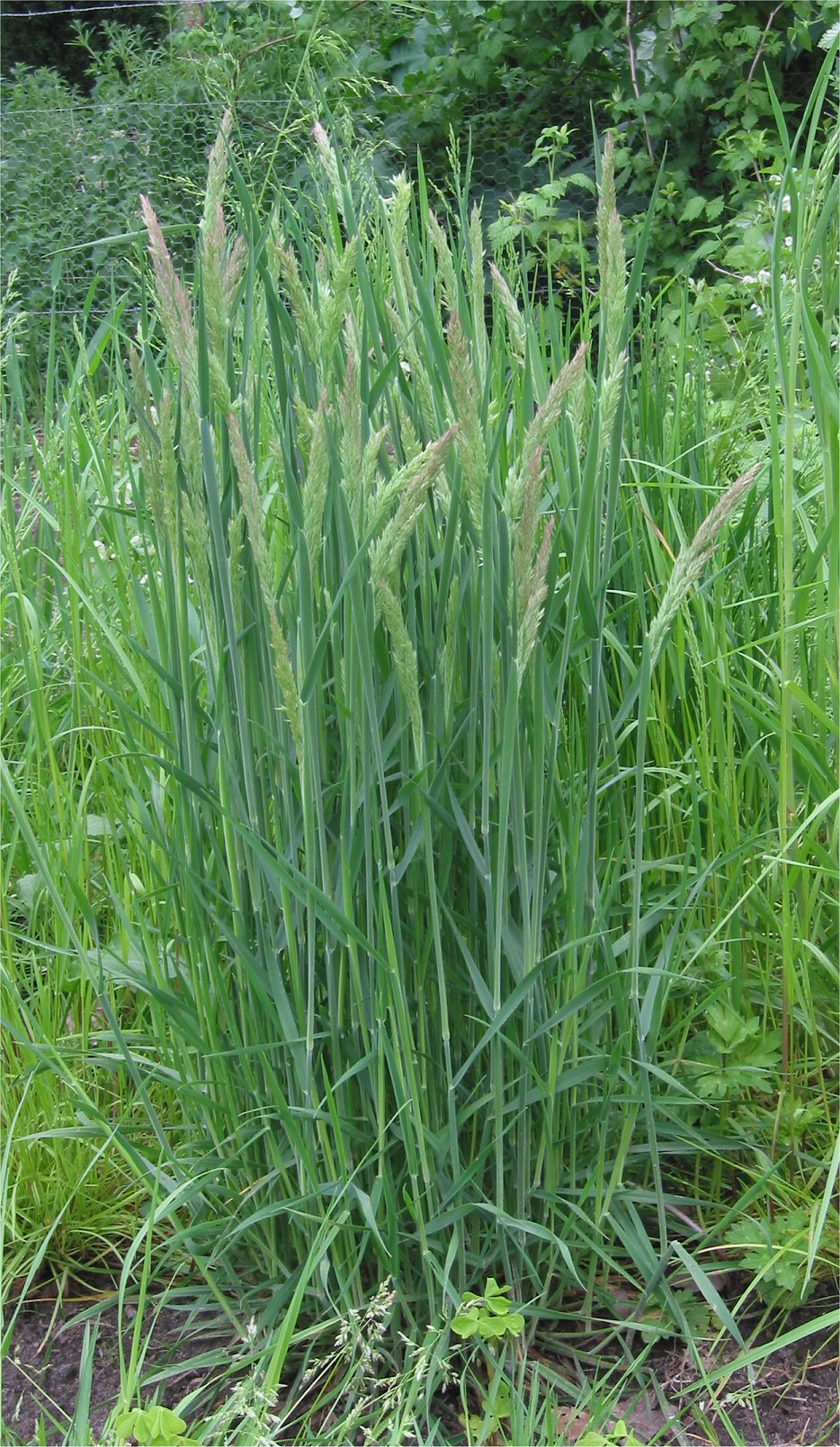

Scientific classification
- Kingdom: Plantae
- Clade: Embryophytes
- Clade: Tracheophytes
- Clade: Spermatophytes
- Clade: Angiosperms
- Clade: Monocots
- Clade: Commelinids
- Order: Poales
- Family: Poaceae
- Subfamily: Pooideae
- Genus: Holcus
- Species: H. lanatus

Binomial name
- Holcus lanatus L.

= Holcus lanatus =

Species of plant

Holcus lanatus is a perennial flowering plant in the grass family Poaceae. The specific epithet lanatus is Latin for 'woolly' which describes the plant's hairy texture. Common names include Yorkshire fog, tufted grass, and meadow soft grass. In North America, where it is an invasive species, names include velvet grass and common velvet grass.

In parts of northern Europe the grass is a common native species and a hardy pasture grass.

== Characteristics and hybrids ==
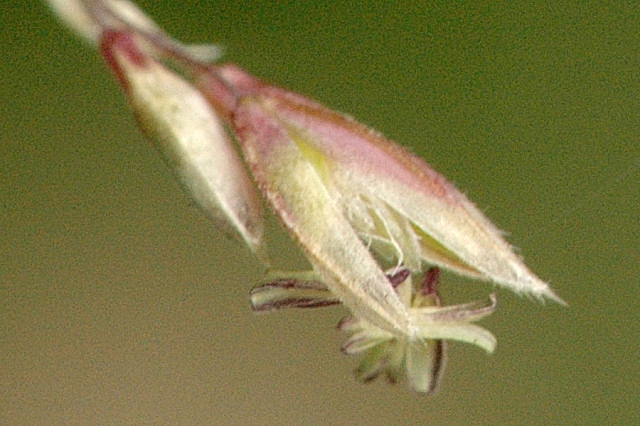
Flower showing anthers

Holcus lanatus has velvety grey-green leaves. The stems are round. The bases of the stems are white with pink stripes or veins; this character has been called the "stripy pyjamas". The inflorescence is robust and often tinged purple. It produces a large amount of seed and is a rapid coloniser of disturbed ground. It prefers wetter ground; it is often seen around drainage ditches. The ligule is 1–4 millimetres (0.039–0.157 in) long, blunt, and hairy.

This species can be distinguished from H. mollis by the beardless nodes on its culm, the absence of rhizomes, and the awn becoming hooked when dry and not projecting beyond the tips of the glumes. It has been known to hybridize with H. mollis, producing a male sterile hybrid with 2n = 21 chromosomes. Hybrids tend to resemble H. lanatus in their morphology.

It spreads vegetatively by developing new shoots and roots at its nodes. Plants form a blanket of runners on the soil surface. Semi-prostrate rosettes of shoots called 'mops' may form at the end of the runners. These mops root readily in contact with moist soil.

== Invasive species and habitat preferences ==
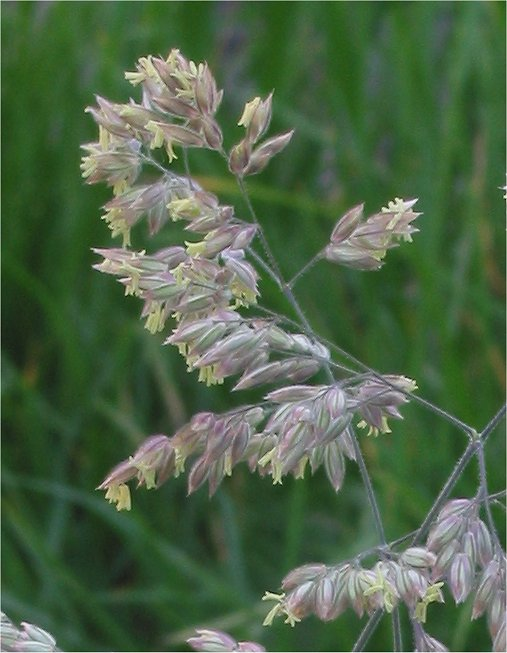
Mature flowers

In a European survey of weed contamination in cereal seed in 1970, Holcus lanatus seed was found in 1% of samples. H. lanatus is an indicator of poor soil, low grazing levels, and poor drainage. It is tolerant of a range of soil pH, but grows best between 5.0 and 7.5. It exhibits climatic tolerance over a wide altitude range, but severe frosts can kill it. It does not survive trampling and puddling. It can be controlled in some European locations by increasing available potassium and phosphorus, increasing stock, and improving drainage. These remedies are not as effective in North America.

=== Noxious weed ===
Holcus lanatus is a significant pest weed in Australia, as it is a winter-growing C_{3} grass and survives droughts and hot summers as seed. It is distasteful to stock unless it is young and little other plant material is available. The flowers are wind-pollinated and usually out-crossing. The first seeds become viable 5 to 9 days after flowering and all are viable after 20 days. Seeds are shed in summer and early autumn. One panicle has 100 to 380 seeds, with 177,000 to 240,000 seeds per plant, depending on time of emergence.

=== Invasive species ===
In North America, Holcus lanatus is an invasive species in native grasslands and other ecosystems. In Yosemite National Park it is one of nine priority noxious weeds to control for habitat restoration and regenerating native plant balances. It forms dense stands that can exclude other plants.

It is also established in Chile and Australia. In the former it has been found as an invasive species in Sphagnum peatlands disturbed by peat extraction in southern Patagonia.

== Ecology ==
Holcus lanatus in its natural habitat is a food source for butterflies such as the speckled wood, the wall, and especially the small skipper. It is rarely utilized by the Essex skipper. In its native range it may occur in plant associations such as the Juncus subnodulosus–Cirsium palustre fen-meadow habitat.

== See also ==
- Invasive grasses of North America
