= Jan Frederik Veldkamp =

Dutch botanist

Jan Frederik Veldkamp (31 March 1941, Amsterdam - 12 November 2017) was a Dutch botanist, plant taxonomist and grass specialist.

== Career ==
He worked in the Rijksherbarium (National Herbarium of the Netherlands), he undertook various plant expeditions in Papua New Guinea. Which were documented between 1984- 2008 in Flora Malesiana Bulletin in about 400 publications. He was a student, friend and also Bridge partner of Dutch botanist Cornelis Gijsbert Gerrit Jan van Steenis (1901–1986).

In 2008, botanists Yasushi Ibaragi and Shiro Kobayashi in J. Jap. Bot. vol.83 on page 108 published Veldkampia, which is a monotypic genus of flowering plants belonging to the family Poaceae. It was named in Veldkamp's honour.

== Eponymy ==
Veldkampia Ibaragi & Shiro Kobay., Artabotrys veldkampii I.M.Turner, Biophytum veldkampii A.E.S.Khan, E.S.S.Kumar & Pushp., Bulbophyllum veldkampii J.J.Verm. & P.O'Byrne, Dimeria veldkampii Kiran Raj & Sivad., Glyphochloa veldkampii M.A.Fonseca & Janarth., Isachne veldkampii K.G.Bhat & Nagendran, Ischaemum veldkampii Lasut, Macrolenes veldkampii Karton., Mnesithea veldkampii Potdar, S.P.Gaikwad, Salunkhe & S.R.Yadav, Papuacalia veldkampii D.J.N.Hind, Vaccinium veldkampii Danet, Veldkampia sagaingensis Ibaragi & Shiro Kobay.
