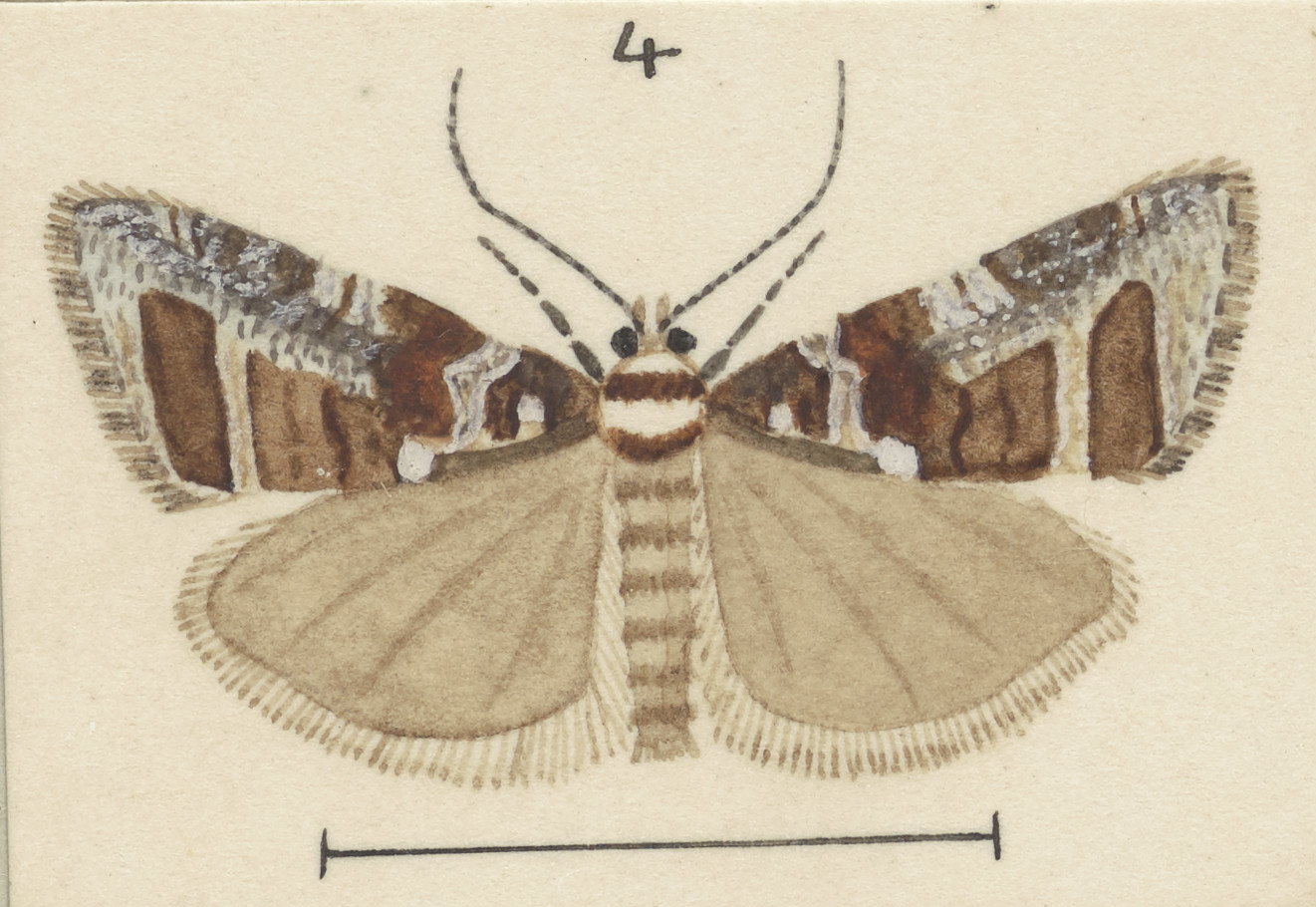
- Illustration of male

Scientific classification
- Domain: Eukaryota
- Kingdom: Animalia
- Phylum: Arthropoda
- Class: Insecta
- Order: Lepidoptera
- Family: Tortricidae
- Genus: Harmologa
- Species: H. columella

Binomial name
- Harmologa columella Meyrick, 1927

= Harmologa columella =

Species of moth

Harmologa columella is a species of moth of the family Tortricidae. It was first described by Edward Meyrick in 1927. It is endemic to New Zealand and is found in the South Island at Arthur's Pass and Mount Arthur. This species inhabits open mountainous terrain above the tree line. The larvae feed on flowering shoots of Cassinia vauvilliersii. They are very active when disturbed. The larvae play host to the fly larvae of Pales tecta. The adult moths are on the wing in January and February.

== Taxonomy ==
This species was first described by Edward Meyrick in 1927 using a male specimen collected by Stella Hudson at Arthur's Pass at approximately 4000 ft in January. George Hudson discussed and illustrated this species both in his 1928 book The butterflies and moths of New Zealand and in his 1939 book A supplement to the butterflies and moths of New Zealand. The holotype specimen is held at the Natural History Museum, London.

== Description ==
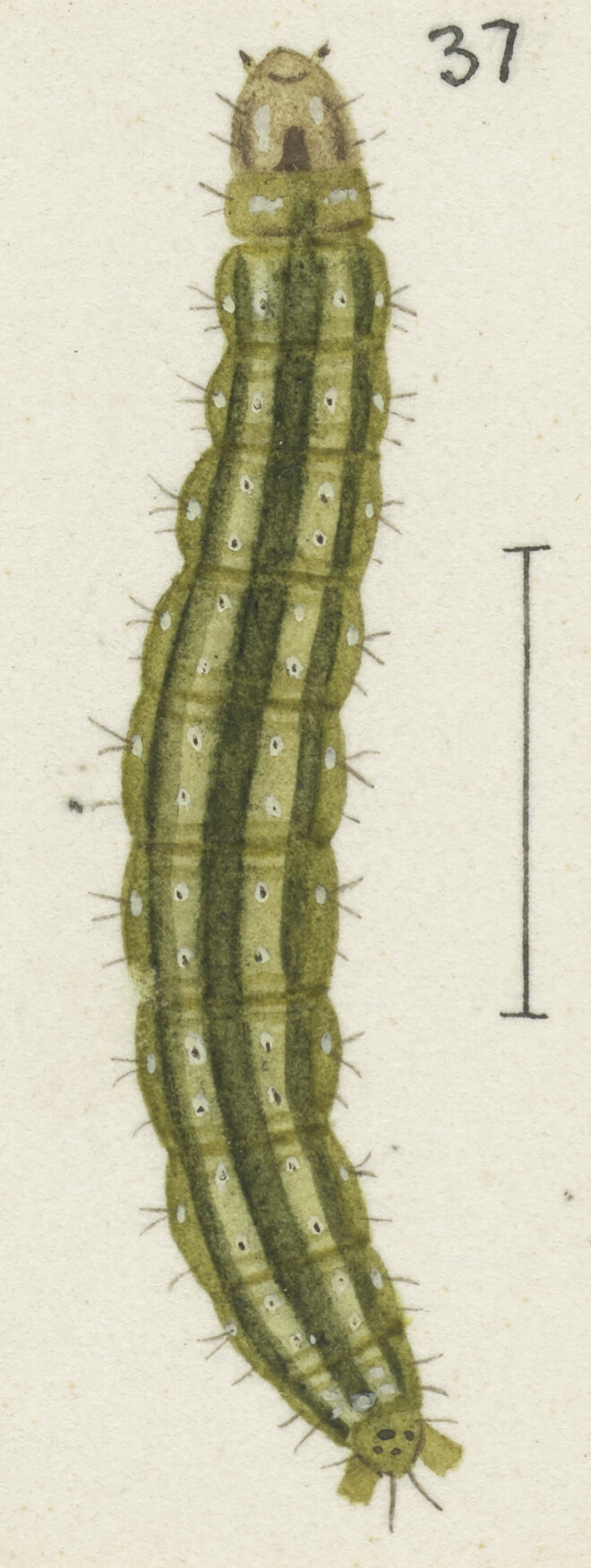
Larva.

Hudson described the larva of this species as follows:

The length of the larva is about 5/8 inch. Flattened, rather broad, tapering at each end, especially posteriorly; dark green with broad, much paler, subdorsal lines. Head very dull brownish-ochreous, with obscure blackish stripe on each side and darker median patch at base. A few fine short bristles.

Meyrick described this species as follows:

♂ 21 mm. Head white, a greyish bar on face, crown greyishtinged, collar ferruginous-grey. Palpi whitish mixed grey and ferruginous. Thorax white, a transverse median band and apex of crest deep ferruginous. Forewings elongate-triangular, costa with moderate fold from base to ¼, termen nearly straight, somewhat oblique; whitish mixed light violet-grey, with some ferruginous strigulae; a moderate basal patch, with subquadrate central prominence whence a strigula connects with a spot on dorsum before middle; central fascia moderately broad, rather oblique; costal patch represented by four dark violet-grey spots and an elongate-triangular violet-grey and ferruginous suffusion connecting them beneath; an erect fasciate evenly broad and straight-edged streak from tornus nearly reaching this: cilia pale grey. Hindwings grey, somewhat darker posteriorly; cilia grey.

== Distribution ==
This species is endemic to New Zealand. It has been observed both at Arthur's Pass and on Mount Arthur.

== Habitat and host ==
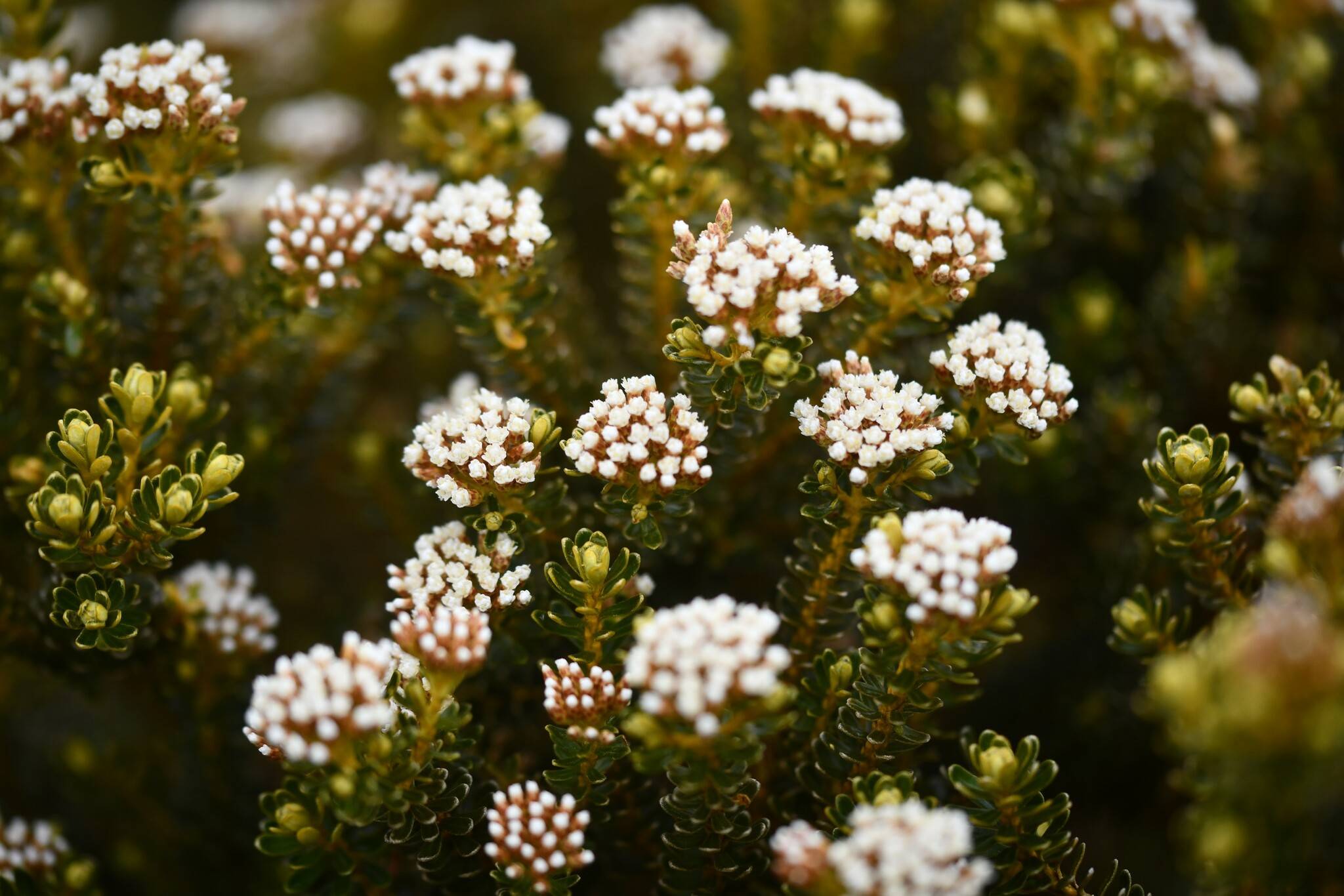
Larval host O. vauvilliersii.

This species inhabits open mountainous country just above the native forest limit. The larvae of this species feed on the spun up flowering shoots of Cassinia vauvilliersii.

== Behaviour ==
The larva is very active when disturbed. Larvae taken around the end of January emerge as adults during February. Adults are on the wing in January and February.

== Enemies ==
This larvae of this moth are the host for the fly species Pales tecta. The larva ingests the eggs of the fly and the fly larva grows in the caterpillar and kills it.
