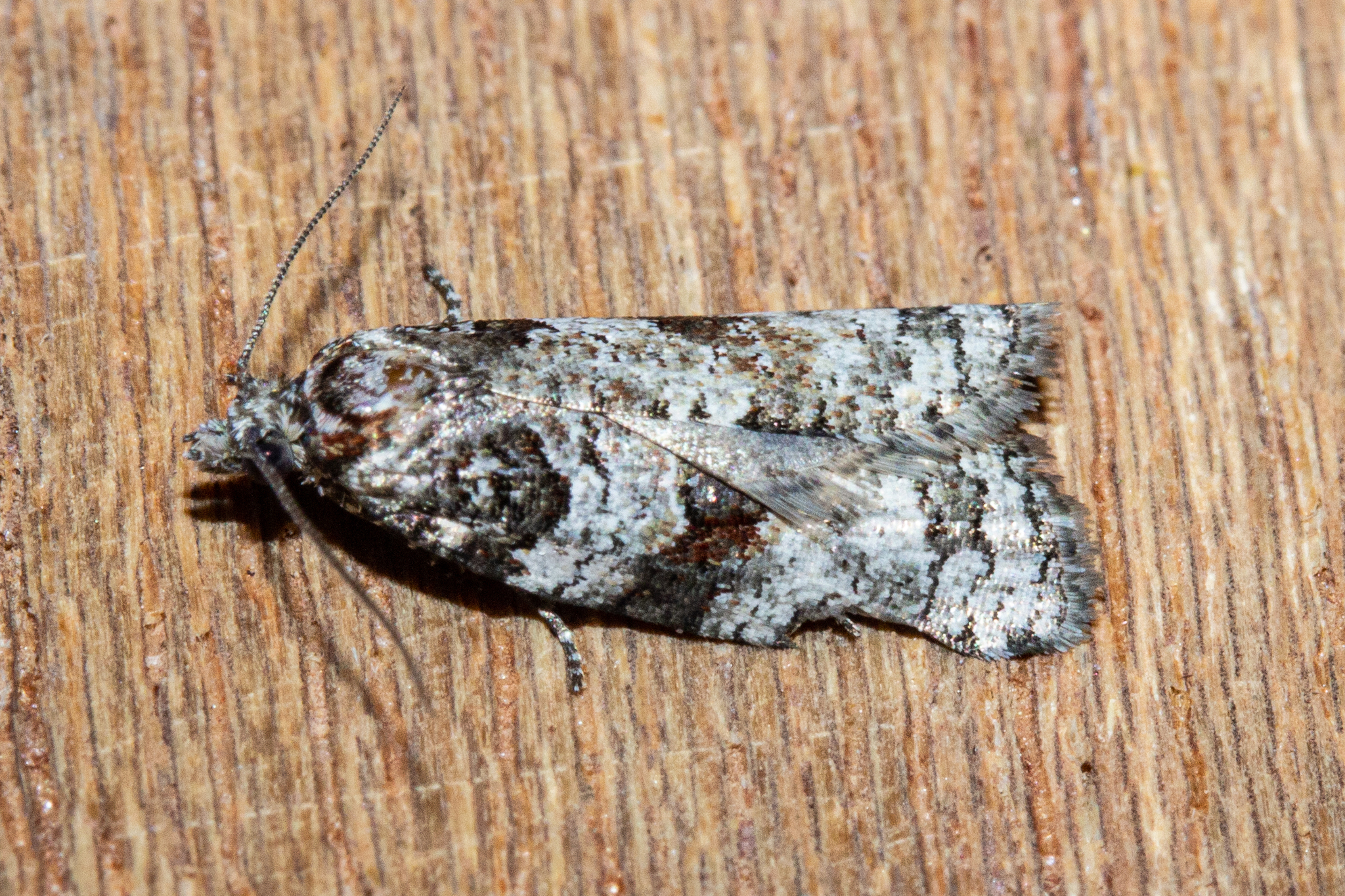

Scientific classification
- Kingdom: Animalia
- Phylum: Arthropoda
- Clade: Pancrustacea
- Class: Insecta
- Order: Lepidoptera
- Family: Tortricidae
- Genus: Harmologa
- Species: H. petrias

Binomial name
- Harmologa petrias Meyrick, 1901

= Harmologa petrias =

Species of moth endemic to New Zealand

Harmologa petrias is a species of moth of the family Tortricidae. This species was first described by Edward Meyrick in 1901. It is endemic to New Zealand and has occurred in the Hunter Mountains, Longwood Range, Invercargill, and Bluff. This species inhabits open country amongst Cassinia as well as shrubland. Adults of this species are on the wing from November until January. The larvae of this species are hosted by Ozothamnus leptophyllus.

== Taxonomy ==
This species was first described in 1901 by Edward Meyrick using a specimen he collected in Invercargill in December. George Hudson, in his 1928 publication The butterflies and moths of New Zealand, described and illustrated this species. The male holotype is held at the Natural History Museum, London.

== Description ==
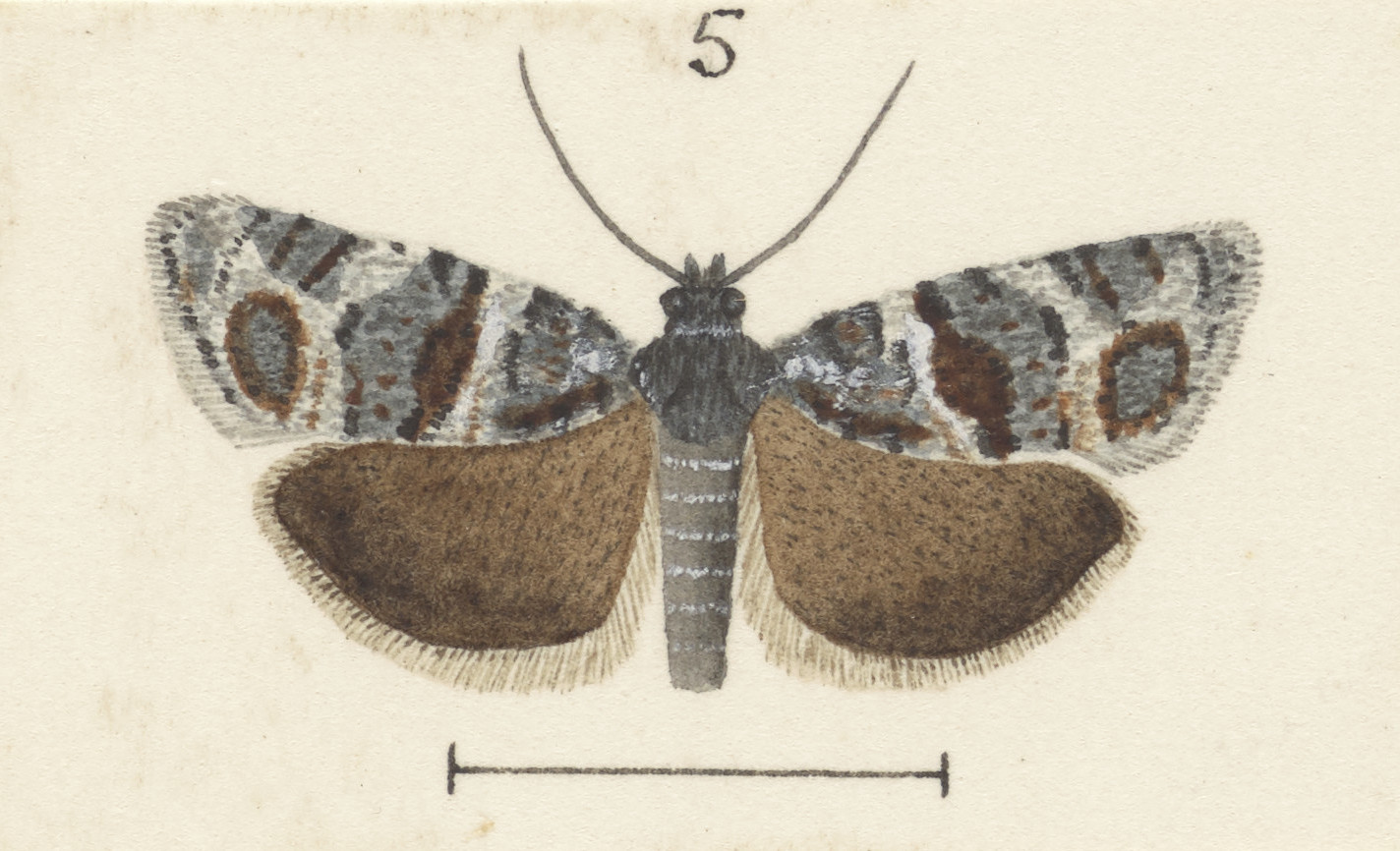
Illustration by Hudson.

Meyrick described this species as follows:

♂. 15m.m. Head and thorax fuscous, mixed with dark fuscous, ochreous, and whitish; thorax crested. Abdomen rather dark fuscous. Forewings moderate, costa gently arched, apex obtuse, termen straight, little oblique, rounded beneath; fuscous irregularly sprinkled with whitish; markings formed by ochreous iroration, mixed especially on edges with black; basal patch with outer edge somewhat obtusely angulated in middle; central fascia moderate, somewhat irregular-edged; costal patch rhomboidal, almost confluent with an erect suboval spot from tornus: cilia fuscous mixed with whitish. Hindwings rather dark fuscous, darker terminally; cilia whitish-fuscous, with a fuscous line.

In some specimens the dark transverse markings appear more broken than in others. H. petrias has a considerable superficial resemblance to Harmologa pontifica, which is a larger insect.

== Distribution ==
H. petrias is endemic to New Zealand. This species has occurred in the Hunter Mountains, Longwood Range, Invercargill, and Bluff.

== Habitat and hosts ==
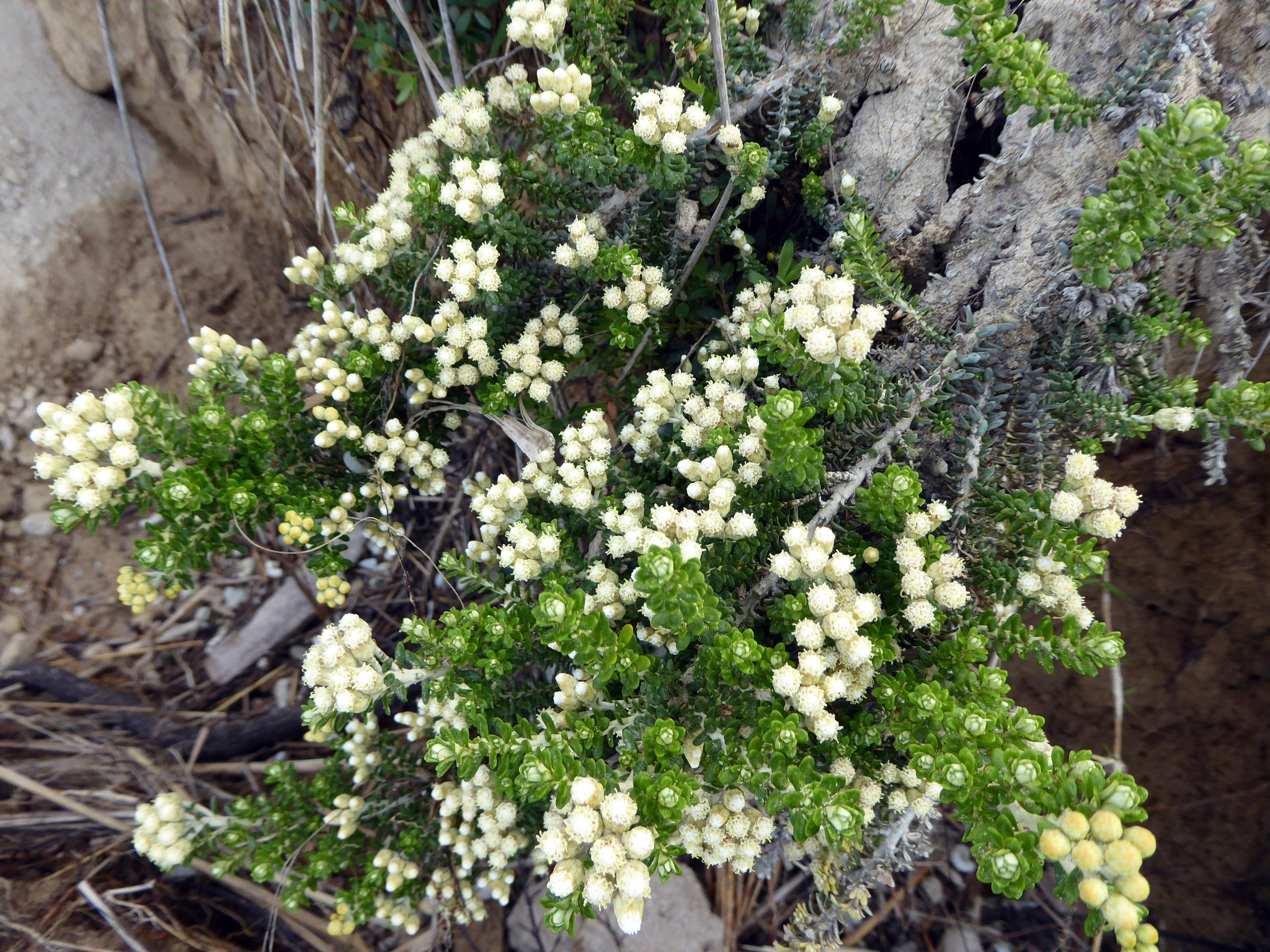
Larval host species O. leptophyllus.

This species inhabits open country amongst Cassinia as well as shrubland. The larval hosts of this moth are species in the genus Ozothamnus including Ozothamnus leptophyllus (previously known as Cassinia vauvilliersii).

== Behaviour ==
Adults of this species is on the wing from November until January. It is a day flying moth.
