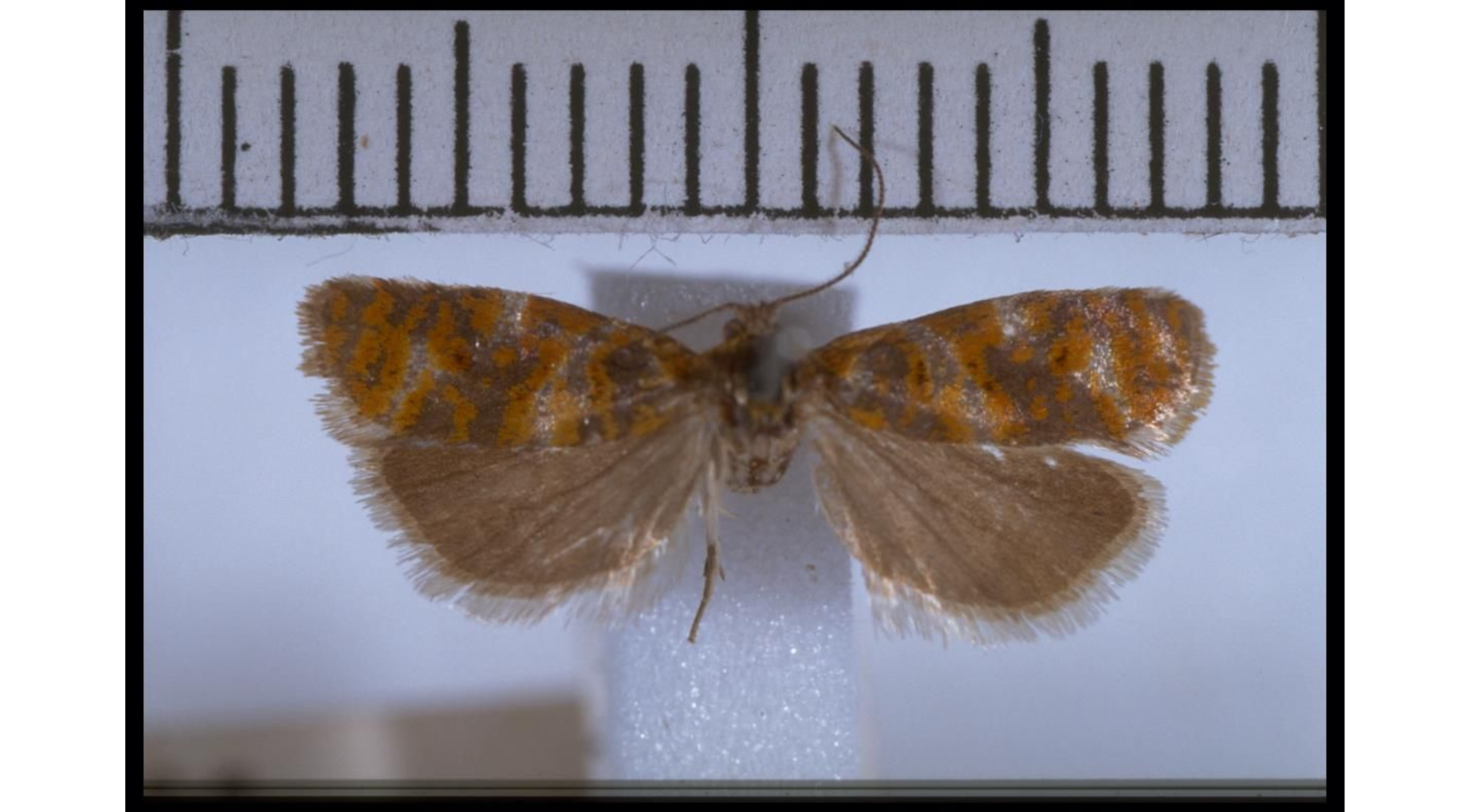
- Male holotype

Scientific classification
- Kingdom: Animalia
- Phylum: Arthropoda
- Class: Insecta
- Order: Lepidoptera
- Family: Tortricidae
- Genus: Harmologa
- Species: H. reticularis

Binomial name
- Harmologa reticularis Philpott, 1915

= Harmologa reticularis =

Species of moth endemic to New Zealand

Harmologa reticularis is a species of moth of the family Tortricidae. This species was first described by Alfred Philpott in 1915. It is endemic to New Zealand and has been collected at the Longwood Range in Southland and at Ben Lomond in Otago. This species inhabits high open country and adults are on the wing in December.

== Taxonomy ==
This species was first described by Alfred Philpott in 1915 using two specimens collected at the Longwood Range in Southland on the bare tops at 2800 ft. in December. George Hudson described and illustrated this species in his 1928 publication The butterflies and moths of New Zealand. In 1928 Philpott studied the male genitalia of this species. The male holotype is held at the New Zealand Arthropod Collection.

== Description ==
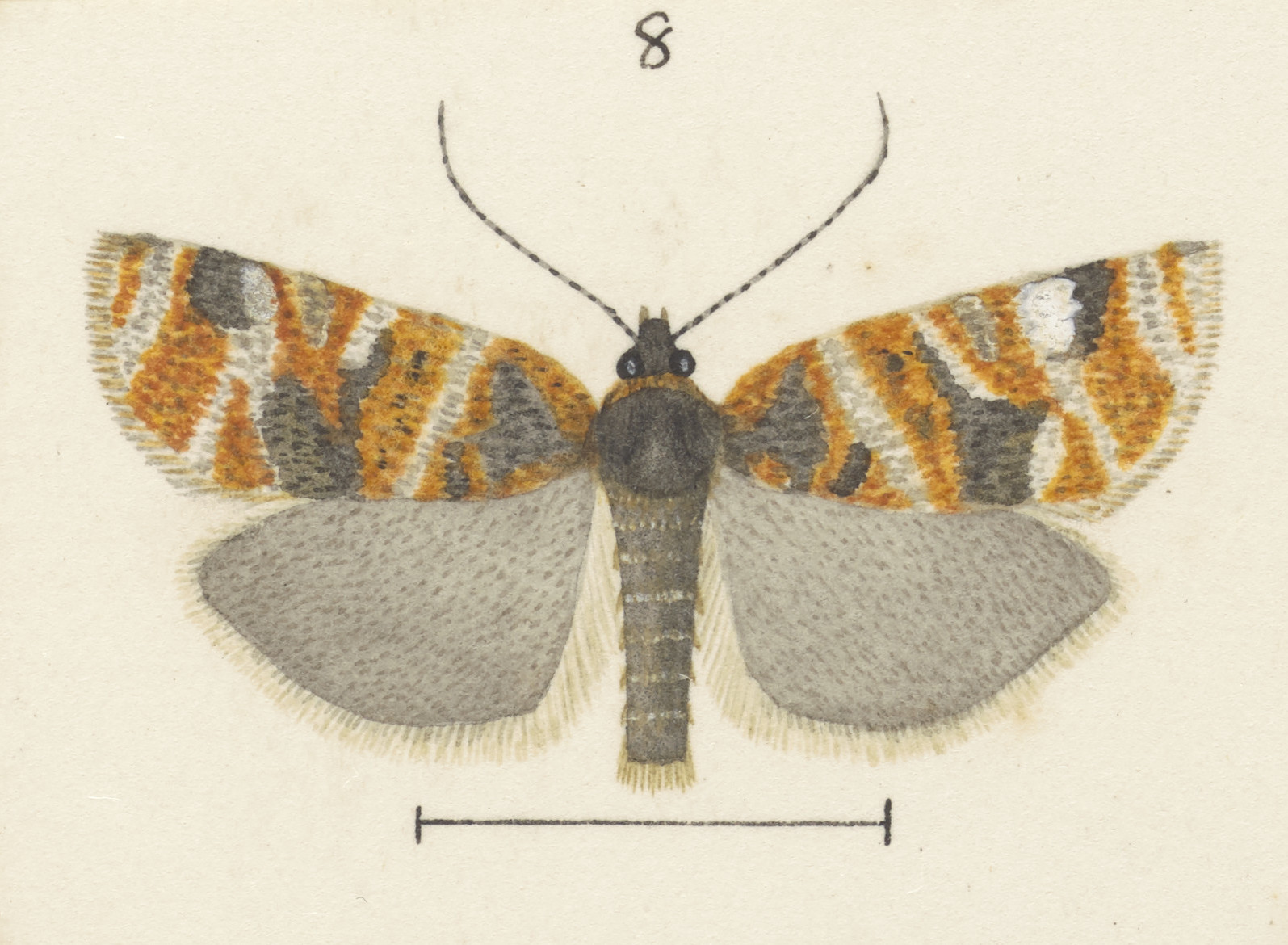
Illustration by Hudson.

Philpott described this species as follows:

♂. 16 1/2—17 1/2 mm. Head greyish-fuscous. Palpi dark brownish-ochreous. Antennae fuscous ringed with whitish, ciliations 1 1/4. Thorax fuscous mixed with orange and white. Abdomen fuscous-grey. Forewings rather elongate, costa moderately arched, apex rounded, termen obliquely rounded; pale orange; some irregular leaden-coloured markings within basal patch; first fascia narrow, outwardly oblique, bifid from middle to dorsum, white; median fascia narrow, outwardly oblique, irregular, costal portion white and the lower half breaking up into a network of leaden-coloured fasciae; a narrow fascia from 3/4 costa, bifid from middle, anterior limb to 3/4 dorsum and posterior limb to tornus, white, leaden-coloured beneath costa and on anterior limb; a white dot, margined beneath with leaden colour, on costa between this fascia and the preceding one; a narrow white subterminal striga, touching termen before tornus : cilia grey mixed with white, tips yellowish. Hindwings greyish-fuscous : cilia greyish-white with darker basal line.

Philpott states that this species is distinctive in colouration and markups. He also points out that one specimen was almost wholly leaden coloured.

== Distribution ==
This species is endemic to New Zealand. It has been observed in Southland and also at Ben Lomond in Otago.

== Habitat ==
H. reticularis inhabits high open country.

== Behaviour ==
Adults of this species are on the wing in December.
