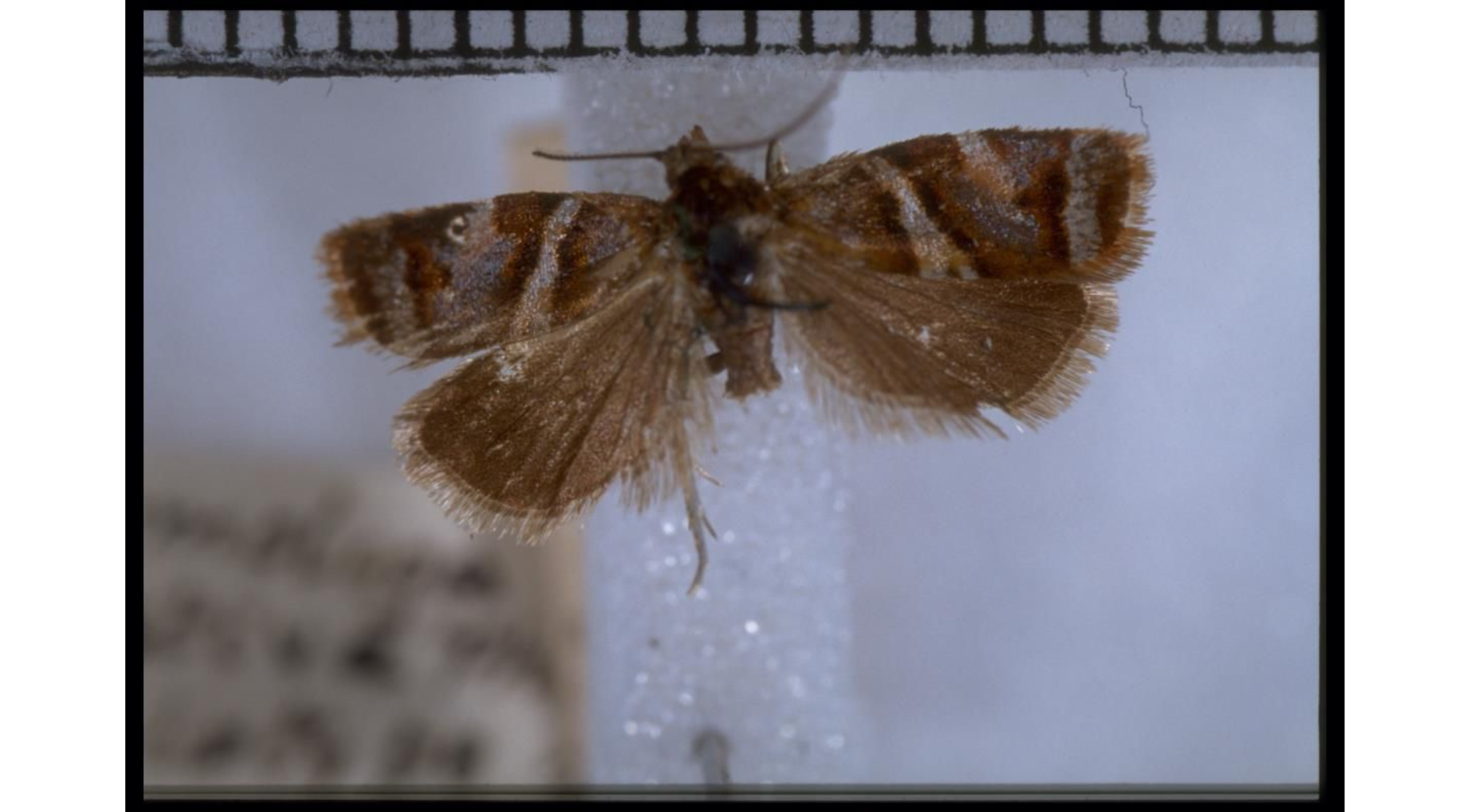
- Male holotype

Scientific classification
- Kingdom: Animalia
- Phylum: Arthropoda
- Class: Insecta
- Order: Lepidoptera
- Family: Tortricidae
- Genus: Harmologa
- Species: H. festiva

Binomial name
- Harmologa festiva Philpott, 1915

= Harmologa festiva =

Species of moth endemic to New Zealand

Harmologa festiva is a species of moth of the family Tortricidae. This species was first described by Alfred Philpott in 1915. It is endemic to New Zealand and is found in the South Island including in the Hunter Mountains, near Manapouri and at Te Anau. This species inhabits subalpine habitat with Veronica and other native shrubs present as well as granite sand plains. Adults are on the wing in January.

== Taxonomy ==
This species was first described by Alfred Philpott in 1915 using specimens collected at Cleughearn Peak in the Hunter Mountains at around 3000 ft. in January. George Hudson described and illustrated this species in his 1928 publication The butterflies and moths of New Zealand. The male holotype is held at the New Zealand Arthropod Collection.

== Description ==
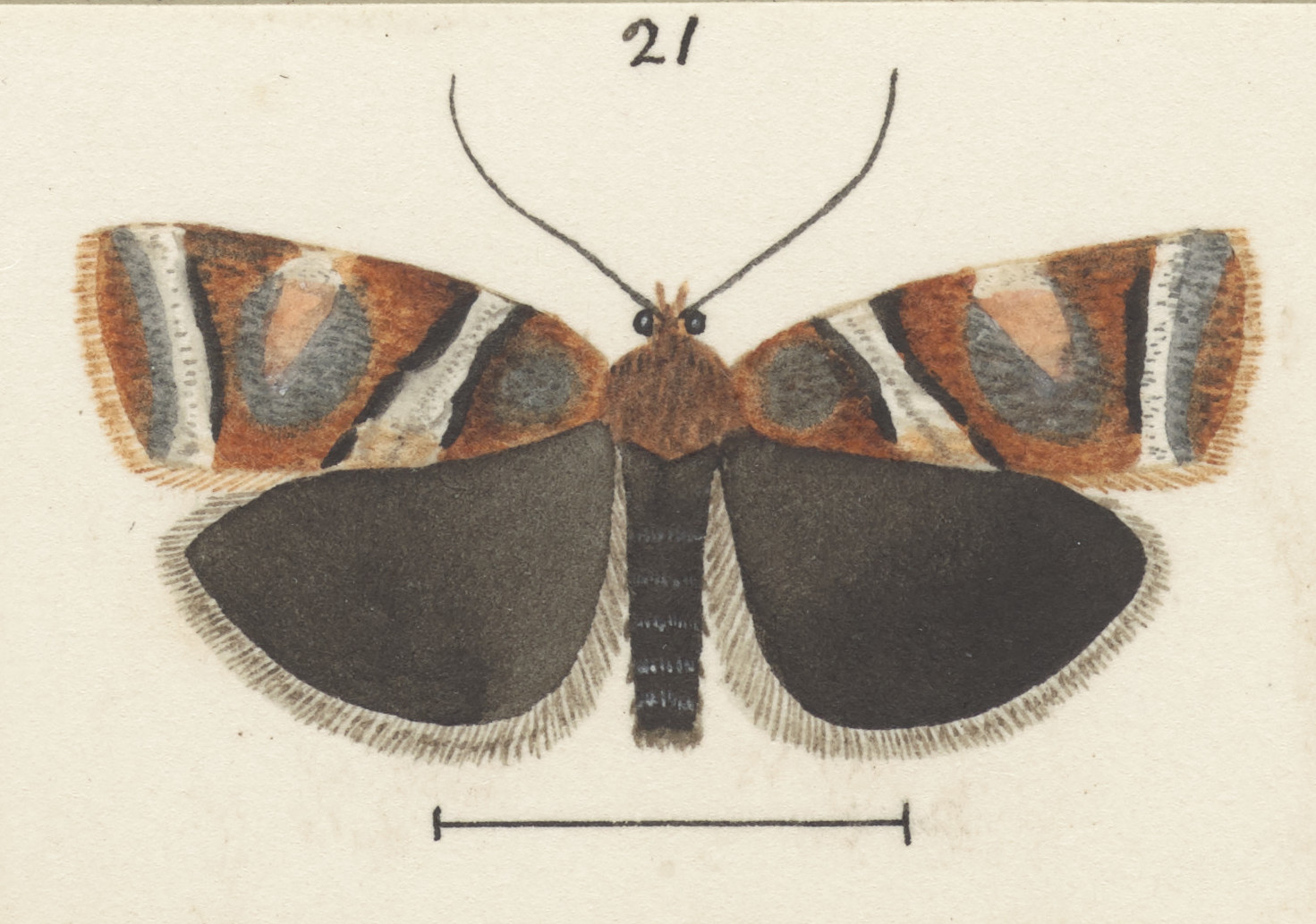
Illustration of male.

Philpott described the species as follows:

♂. 16 mm. Head grey. Palpi ferruginous. Antennae fuscous, obscurely ringed with paler, ciliations 1. Thorax fuscous mixed with ochreous-reddish and grey. Abdomen fuscous, segmental divisions grey. Forewings moderate, rather oblong, costa strongly arched, apex obtuse, termen bowed, hardly oblique; bright ochreous-red; fasciae white; first fascia, defining basal patch, outwardly oblique, almost straight, narrowest towards costa, its edges suffusedly margined with blackish, clouded above and below middle with ochreous, median fascia broad, dilated in disc, lower half almost filled with ochreous blotch; subterminal fascia straight, blackish-margined, from ⅚ costa to tornus: cilia pale ochreous with darker basal line. Hindwings fuscous: cilia as in forewings but paler. A shorter-winged species than the preceding; the antennal ciliations are also shorter.

== Distribution ==
H. festiva is endemic to New Zealand and is found in the South Island, including at The Hump and Flat Top Mountain near Manapouri and at Te Anau.

== Habitat ==
This species can be found in subalpine habitats with Veronica and other shrubs present. H. festiva has also been observed in granite sand plains near Mt Titiroa.

== Behaviour ==
Adults of this species are on the wing in January.
