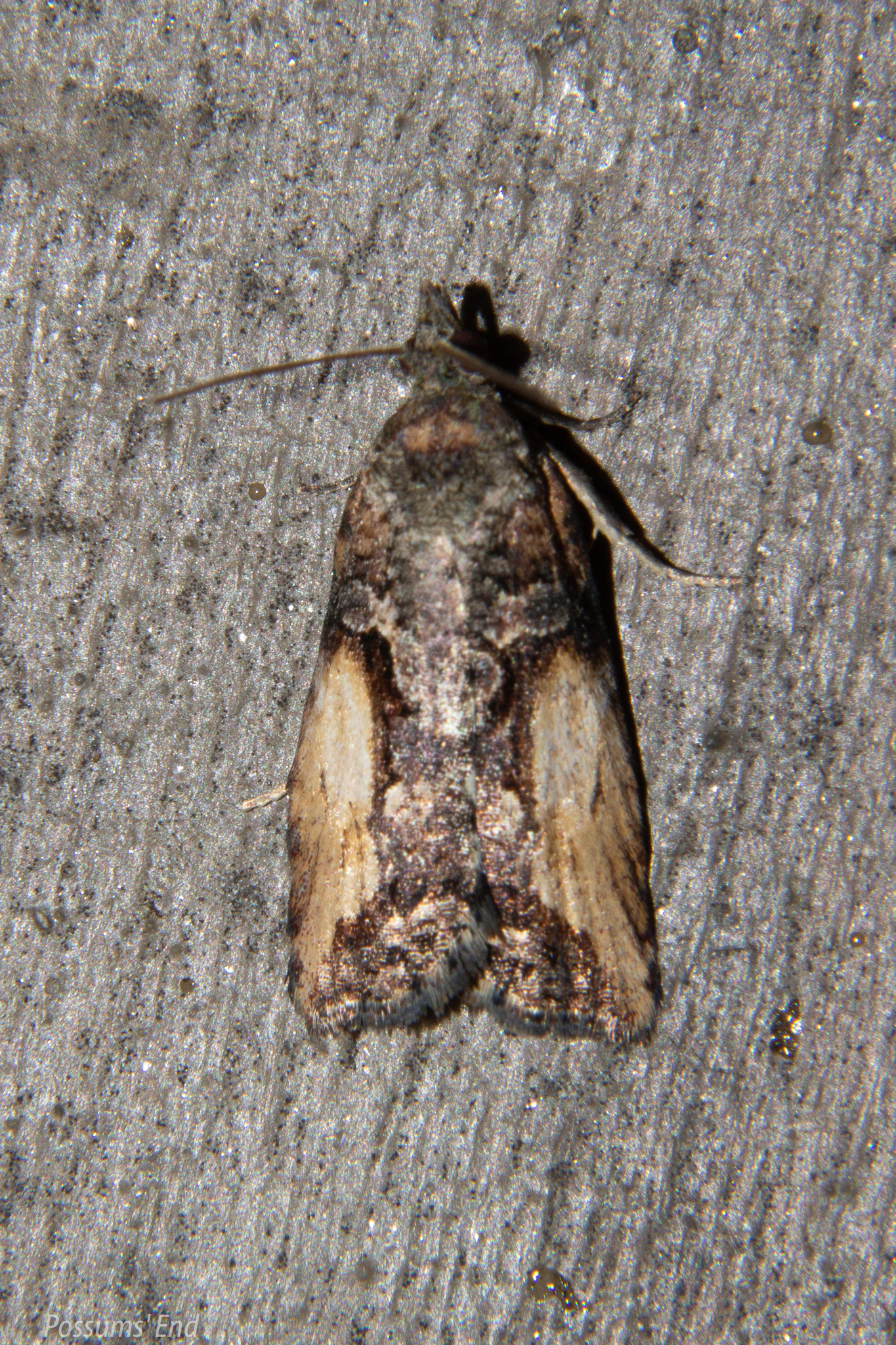

Scientific classification
- Domain: Eukaryota
- Kingdom: Animalia
- Phylum: Arthropoda
- Class: Insecta
- Order: Lepidoptera
- Family: Tortricidae
- Genus: Harmologa
- Species: H. scoliastis

Binomial name
- Harmologa scoliastis (Meyrick, 1907)

Synonyms
- Trachybathra scoliastis Meyrick, 1907; Harmologa scoliastes (Meyrick, 1907)

= Harmologa scoliastis =

Species of moth endemic to New Zealand

Harmologa scoliastis is a species of moth of the family Tortricidae. This species was first described by Edward Meyrick in 1907. It is endemic to New Zealand and is found in the southern parts of the North Island and throughout the South Island. This species inhabits open country and has an affinity for Discaria toumatou. Adults are on the wing from November until April, most commonly in January and February.

== Taxonomy ==
This species was first described by Edward Meyrick in 1907 using a specimen collected by George Hudson at Lake Wakatipu and named Trachybathra scoliastis. Meyrick placed this species in the genus Harmologa in 1911. George Hudson discussed and illustrated this species in his 1928 book The butterflies and moths of New Zealand. The male holotype is held at the Natural History Museum, London.

== Description ==
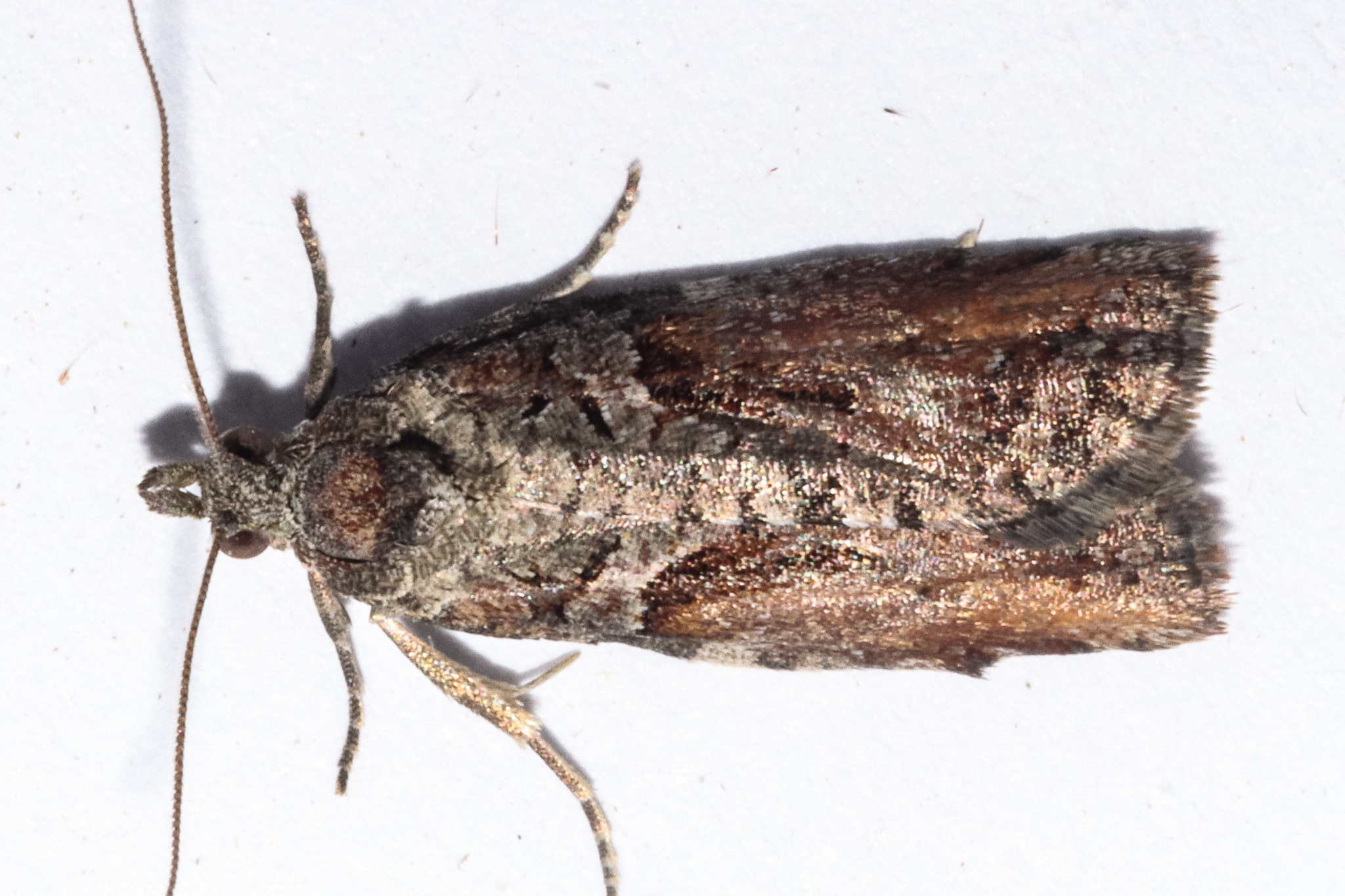
Harmologa scoliastis.

Meyrick described this species as follows:

♂. 18 mm. Head, palpi, and thorax brownish irrorated with grey-whitish and dark fuscous. Abdomen fuscous. Forewings elongate, hardly dilated, costa slightly bent before middle, apex obtuse, termen faintly sinuate beneath apex, bowed, oblique; pale brownish, partially suffused irregularly with whitish, costa and dorsum strigulated with dark fuscous; outer edge of basal patch indicated by a blackish line in disc, obsolete towards extremities; an irregular incurved fuscous streak marked with black from ⅖ of costa to below middle of disc, followed by whitish suffusion; an irregular dark-fuscous spot above tornus, and some dark-fuscous strigulae towards lower part of termen: cilia grey-whitish mixed with dark grey. Hindwings fuscous, strigulated with darker; some undefined ochreous-yellowish suffusion in centre of disc and towards costa in middle; cilia pale grey, with dark-grey subbasal line.

== Distribution ==
This species is endemic to New Zealand. This species is found in the southern parts of the North Island and throughout the South Island.

== Habitat and hosts ==
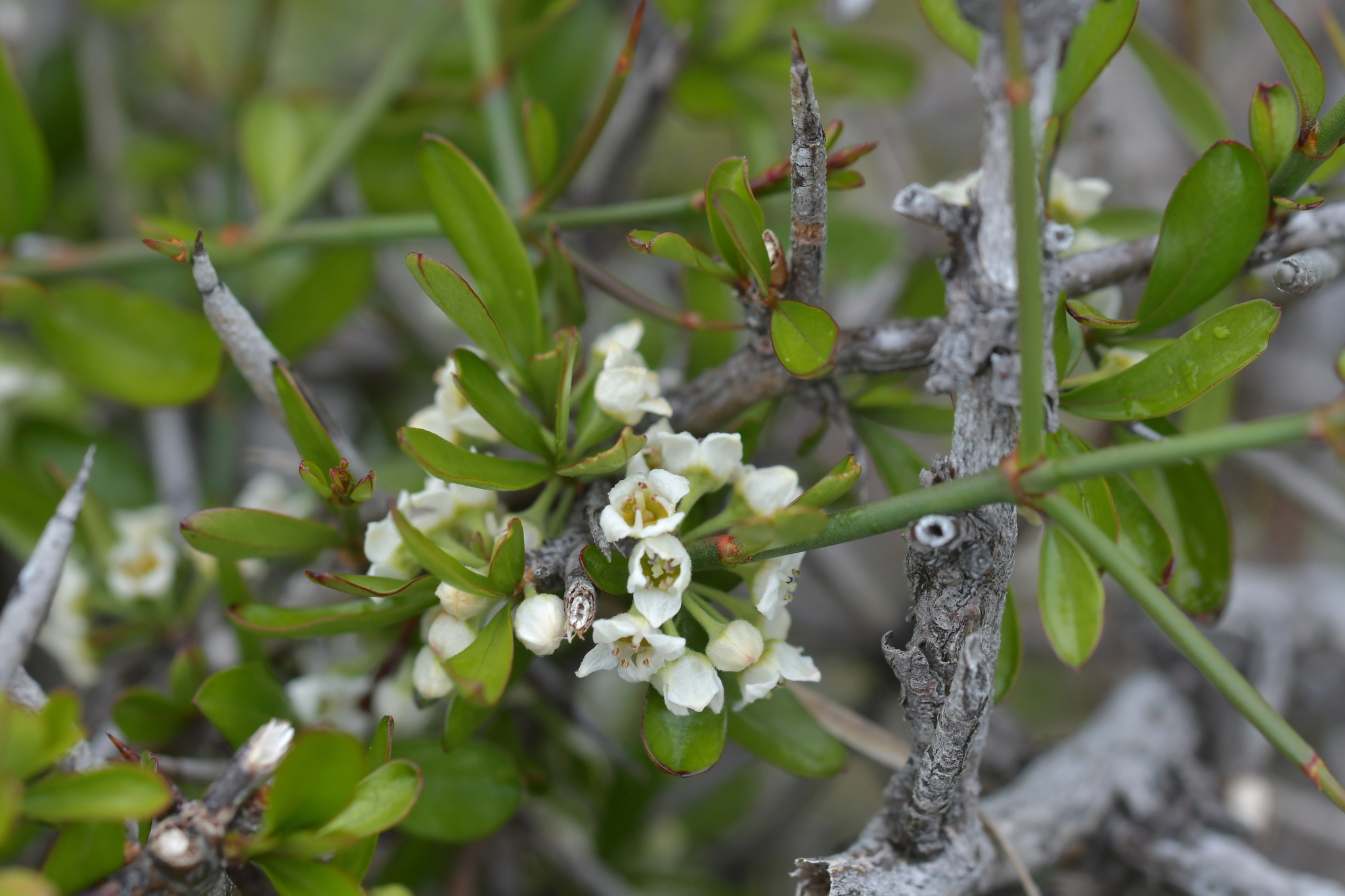
Matagouri (Discaria toumatou).

H. scoliastis inhabits open country. Hudson stated that he obtained specimens by dislodging them from the foliage of Discaria toumatou growing on the banks of the Dart River.

== Behaviour ==
Adults of H. scoliastis are on the wing from November until April, most commonly in January and February. Hudson recorded that a Mr. Gourlay states that

the larva of this insect sometimes inhabits the swellings

in the stems of Muehlenbeckia made by the larva of Morovu

subfasciata*
