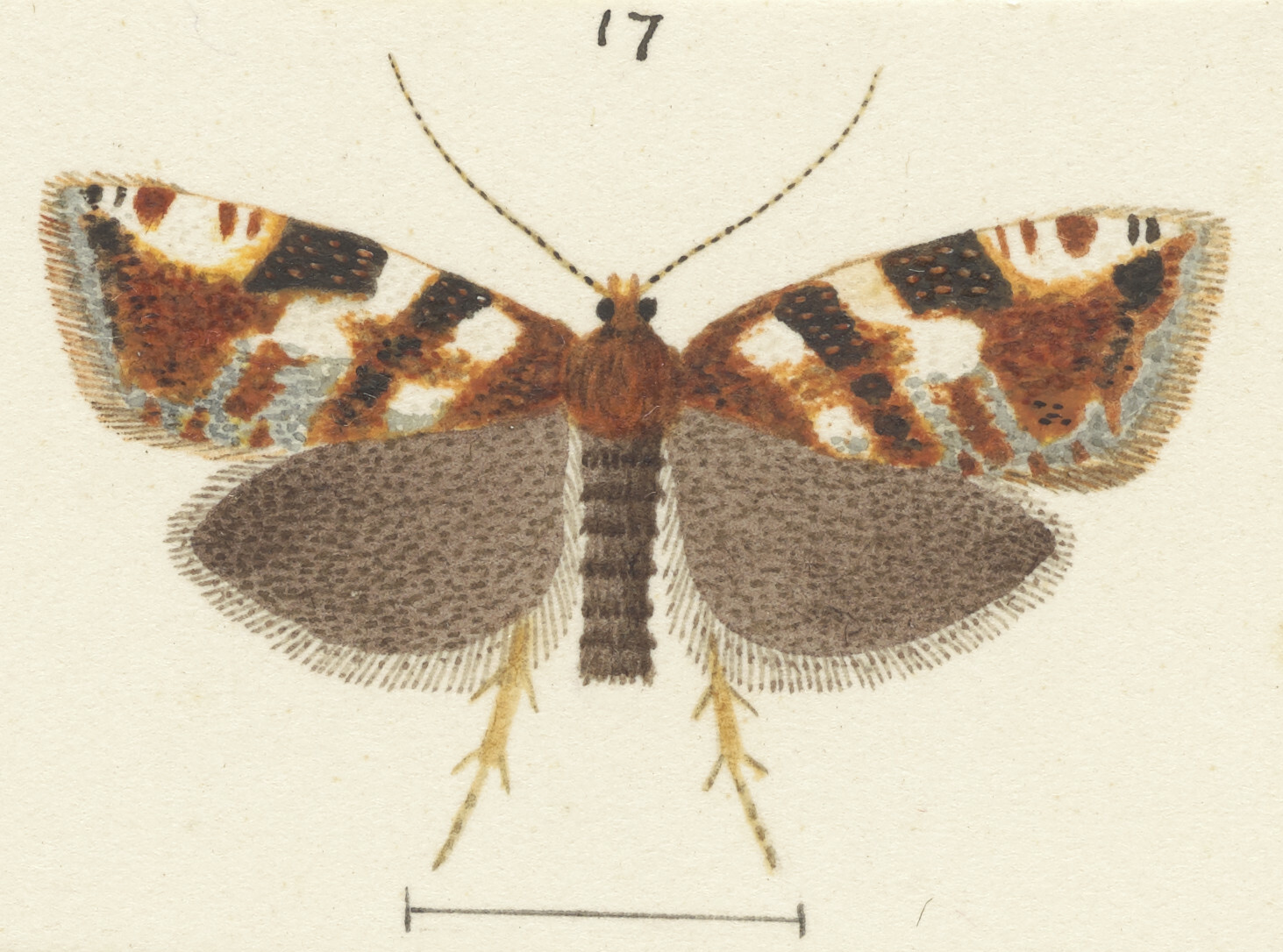
- Hudson's illustration of H. speciosa.

Scientific classification
- Domain: Eukaryota
- Kingdom: Animalia
- Phylum: Arthropoda
- Class: Insecta
- Order: Lepidoptera
- Family: Tortricidae
- Genus: Harmologa
- Species: H. speciosa

Binomial name
- Harmologa speciosa (Philpott, 1927)

Synonyms
- Epichorista speciosa Philpott, 1927

= Harmologa speciosa =

Species of moth endemic to New Zealand

Harmologa speciosa is a species of moth of the family Tortricidae. This species was first described by Alfred Philpott in 1927. It is endemic to New Zealand and has been observed in the Canterbury and Otago regions. Larvae have been observed feeding on Hebe odora and the adult moth has been observed on the wing in January and February.

== Taxonomy ==
This species was first described by Alfred Philpott in 1927 using a male specimen collected by S. Lindsay at Arthur's Pass in February and named Epichorista speciosa. In 1928 Alfred Philpott studied the male genitalia of this species. George Hudson discussed and illustrated this species in his 1939 book A supplement to the butterflies and moths of New Zealand. In 1988 John S. Dugdale placed this species in the genus Harmologa. The male holotype is held at the Canterbury Museum.

== Description ==
Philpott described this species as follows:

♂. 14 mm. Head, palpi and thorax ferruginous. Antennae ringed alternately with ochreous-grey and black, ciliations in male 1 1/2. Abdomen dark greyish-fuscous. Legs greyish-ochreous, anterior pair fuscous, all tarsi annulated with ochreous. Forewings, costa straight, apex almost rectangular, termen slightly rounded, little oblique; white; markings ferruginous mixed with ochreous and black; a small basal patch, including costal fold, margin outwardly oblique; a prominent fairly broad straight fascia from apex of costal fold to before 1/2 of dorsum, outer margin extended in disc by ochreous patch; an outwardly oblique broad fascia from middle of costa, greatly constricted (almost interrupted) at middle, thence much dilated and recurved to apex; several spots on costa between 1/2 and apex, and some irregular markings between fasciae on dorsum, where the ground-colour is leaden grey; fringes ferruginous, tipped with yellowish-ochreous. Hindwings dark fuscous; fringes fuscous with darker basal line, round tips ochreous.

This species is similar in appearance to Epichorista zatrophana but is larger.

== Distribution ==
This species is endemic to New Zealand. It has been observed in the Canterbury and Otago Regions.

== Habitat and hosts ==
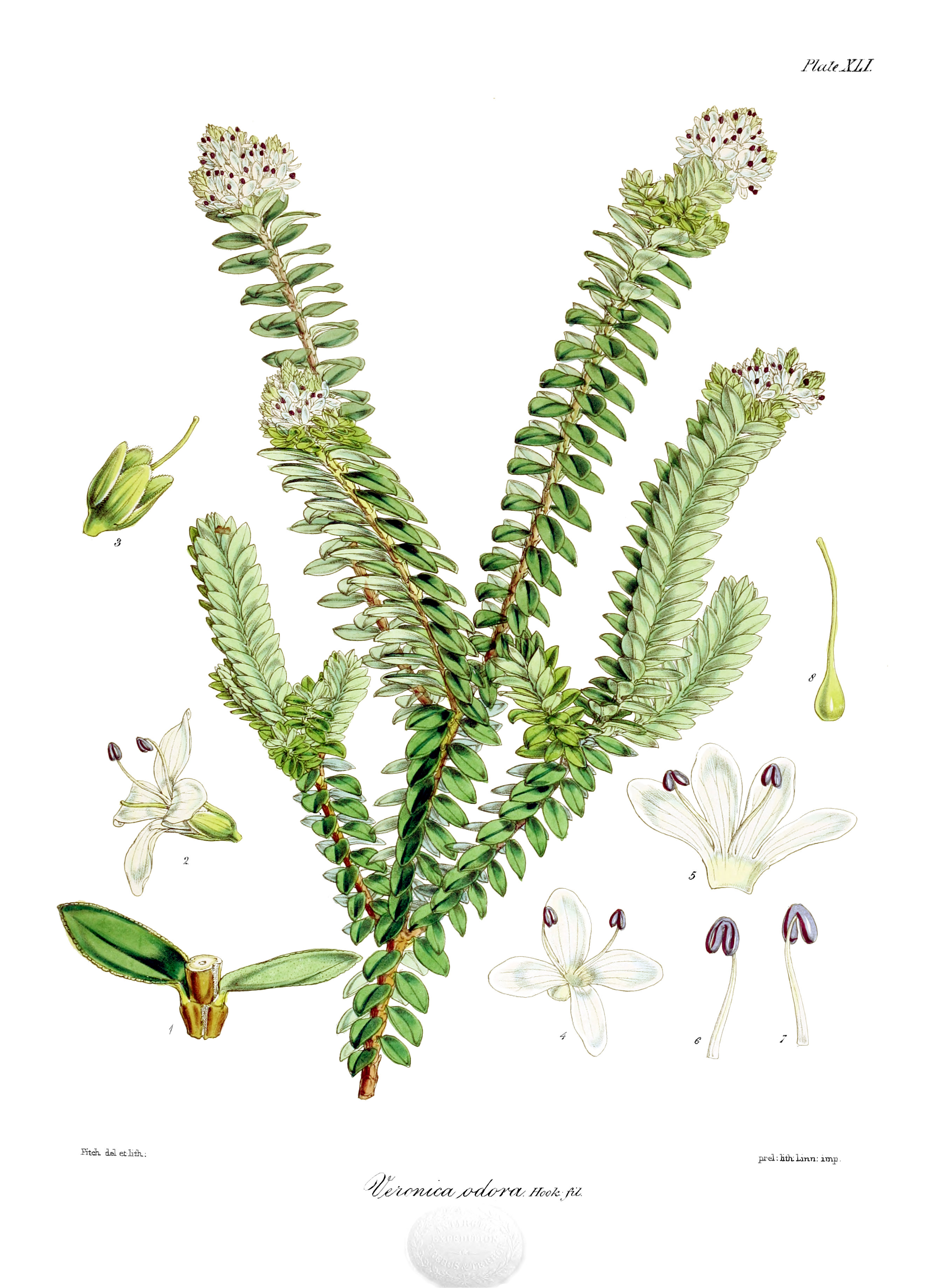
Larval host plant Hebe odora.

Larvae have been collected feeding on Hebe odora and have been found in abundant numbers on their host plant.

== Behaviour ==
Adults are on the wing in January and February.
