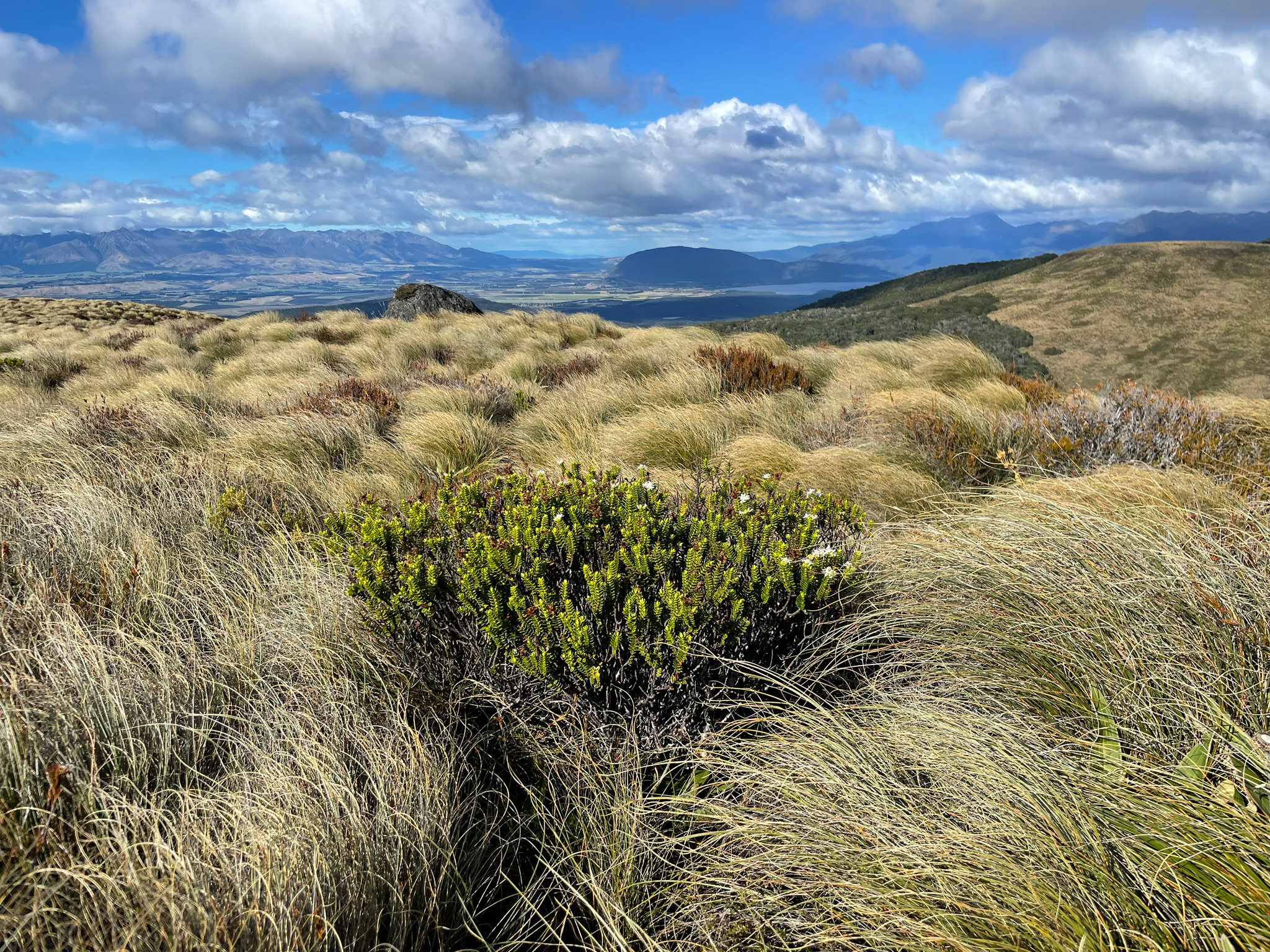
- Veronica odora in Fiordland National Park

Scientific classification
- Kingdom: Plantae
- Clade: Embryophytes
- Clade: Tracheophytes
- Clade: Spermatophytes
- Clade: Angiosperms
- Clade: Eudicots
- Clade: Asterids
- Order: Lamiales
- Family: Plantaginaceae
- Genus: Veronica
- Section: Veronica sect. Hebe
- Species: V. odora

Binomial name
- Veronica odora Hook.f.

Synonyms
- Hebe odora (Hook.f.) Cockayne; Leonohebe odora (Hook.f.) Heads; Hebe anomala (J.B.Armstr.) Cockayne; Hebe buxifolia (Benth.) Cockayne & Allan; Hebe haustrata (Anon.) Andersen; Veronica anomala J.B.Armstr.; Veronica buxifolia Benth.; Veronica haustrata Anon.

= Veronica odora =

Species of flowering plant

Veronica odora, known as the boxwood hebe, mountain-box, Hebe odora or Hebe buxifolia, is a plant in the family Plantaginaceae, and it is native to New Zealand. Veronica odora was discovered on the Auckland Islands by J.D Hooker in 1840. A certain amount of confusion later arose following its collection on mainland New Zealand by Ernst Dieffenbach and its naming as Veronica buxifolia by George Bentham. Even overseas, Veronica odora is still not infrequently known as Veronica buxifolia.

== Description ==
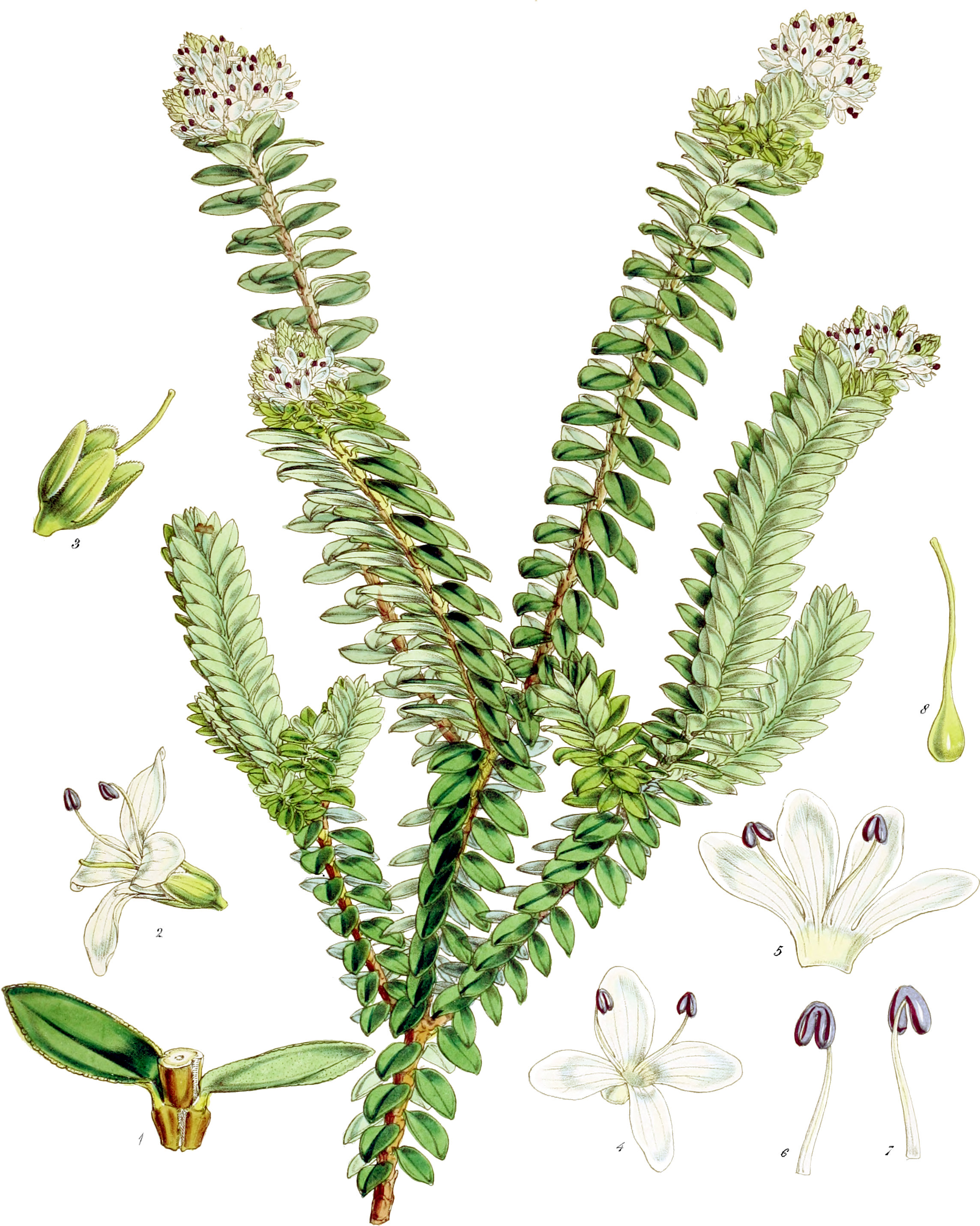
Veronica odora from the Flora of Lord Auckland and Campbell's Islands by Walter Hood Fitch, 1844

Veronica odora is an easily recognizable round, spherical and evergreen shrub. Its Buxus-like foliage has given rise to this plant's common name, boxwood. Veronica odora is grows slowly. Normally, it can grow to about 1 m high, but in a suitable environment, it can grow to 1.5m or even higher. The leaves of the plant are elliptic-ovate. They are compact, dense and upright, 1–2 cm long and 4-10mm wide. They are generally dark green and cortical. The upper surface of the leaf is dark green, smooth, and shiny, while the lower part is dim and pale. Leaf buds have a small gap at the base. The young branches are usually green to yellowish green, and the leaf buds are obviously heart-shaped or shield-shaped. The blade edge has obvious beveled edges, the midrib on the lower surface of the blade is obvious, and the blade base has obvious protrusions. Inflorescences are usually terminal, with one or two pairs of lateral spikes, or sometimes only one spike, which may be terminal or lateral. The peduncle is short and often hidden by leaves. Because of the growth habit of inflorescences, most Veronica odora have conical flower heads.

== Distribution ==
As a native plant of New Zealand, Veronica odora is widely distributed. It inhabits the North Island, South Island, Stewart Island and Auckland Island. It is common in the subalpine to low mountain areas to the south of Hikurangi Mountain, and in the humid environment with an altitude of 600 to 1400 meters, but poorly represented in the forests. It usually exists in subalpine shrubs and mixed snow grass, and sometimes extends to snow grass grassland. At the same time, it can be seen in areas such as riverbanks, cliffs and ridges. Veronica odora is also found in urban environments and some people plant it in their own gardens, because it is cold-resistant and easy to grow.

== Life cycle ==
Veronica odora is a very common plant in cultivation. It usually in October (mid spring) to March (early autumn) produces white flowers, and although its name odora has the meaning of fragrance, has no odour. It fruits in December – April.

It has two modes of dispersal. One is to spread its seeds far away through the wind, but these seeds are very fragile and cannot be preserved for a long time. Autumn is the best time to plant Veronica odora. People need to plant the seed in a position that is not exposed to direct sunlight and provide 12-15 °C for optimum germination temperature. If those conditions are met, seeds will generally germinate the following spring.

Another method of dispersal is cuttings, in which 10–12 cm branches are transplanted into soft soil in spring. The growing tip can be removed to promote bushy growth. The low temperature of 12-15 °C is very suitable for cutting growth. Too high a temperature can cause the cuttings to rot or dry out. Cutting selection is also very important, people cannot choose old wood, damaged shrubs, shrubs damaged by disease and insects, poor flowering or poor growth of shrubs and so on. Cuttings should be obtained from growing branches and cutting should avoid cutting the growing buds under the stem. To take root successfully, people should choose a twig that is not too soft, or it will wither.

== Interactions ==
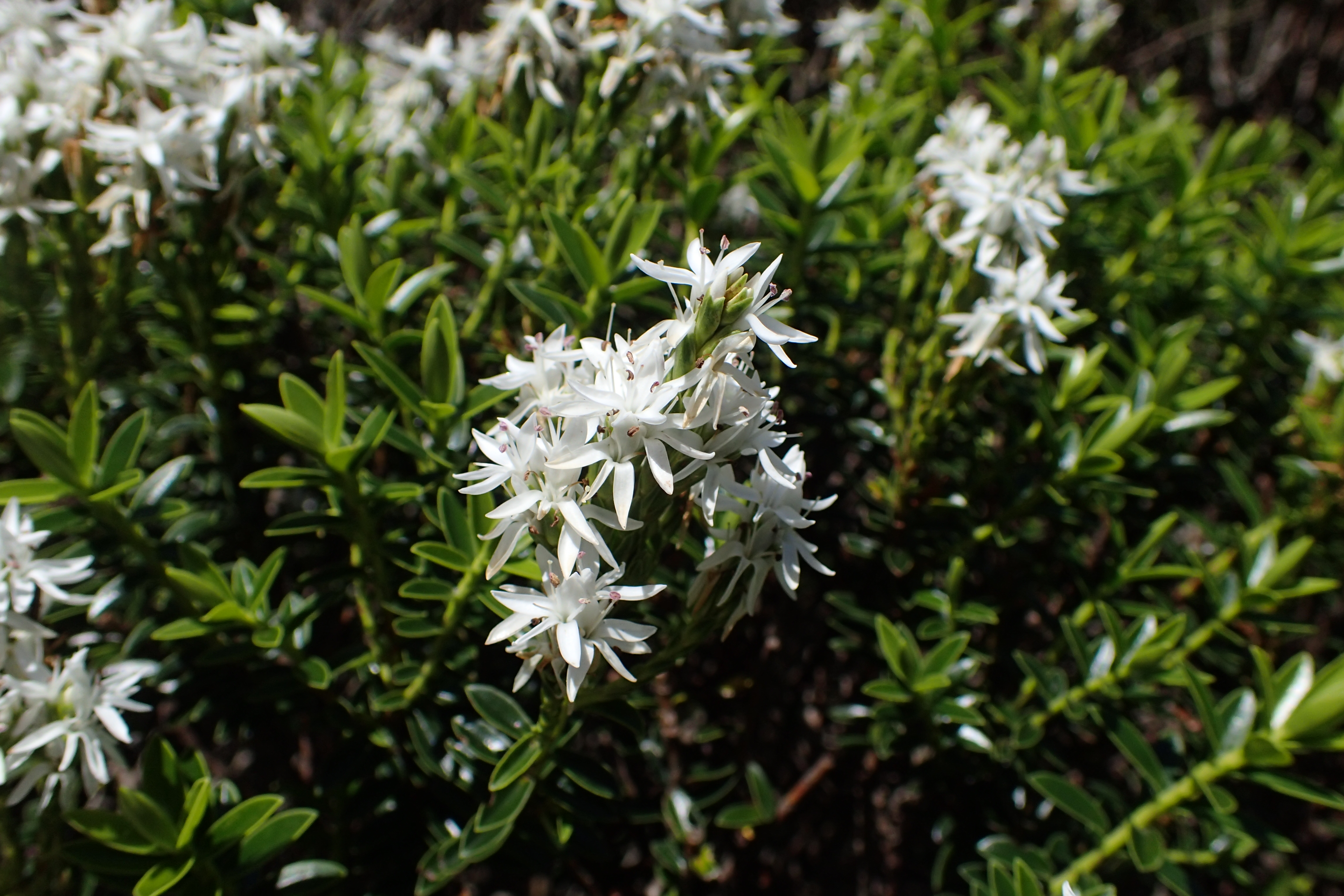
Veronica odora in Dunedin Botanic Garden by Krzysztof Ziarnek, Kenraiz, 2017

=== Habit ===
Veronica odora is best planted in sunny or partially shaded areas to enhance its color, but if planted in full shady areas, its flowering will be delayed or reduced, the shoots will become longer and thinner, and the leaves will change color and become smaller. When placed in a sunny place, it should also be protected from direct summer sunlight, which can cause burns. It can grow well in places with high rainfall because it likes wet conditions, but it is also drought tolerant. When planting in dry areas, wishing to encourage deeper rooting, it is best to water and mulch it regularly in the late afternoon or early morning, otherwise the water will evaporate quickly. Dry soil can also cause shrub leaves to turn pale. Veronica odora can survive in common garden soil, acidic or alkaline. However, it is necessary to avoid excessive fertilizer or compost. The plant is wind-resistant and is much less vulnerable to strong winds than other plants.

=== Threats, pests and diseases ===
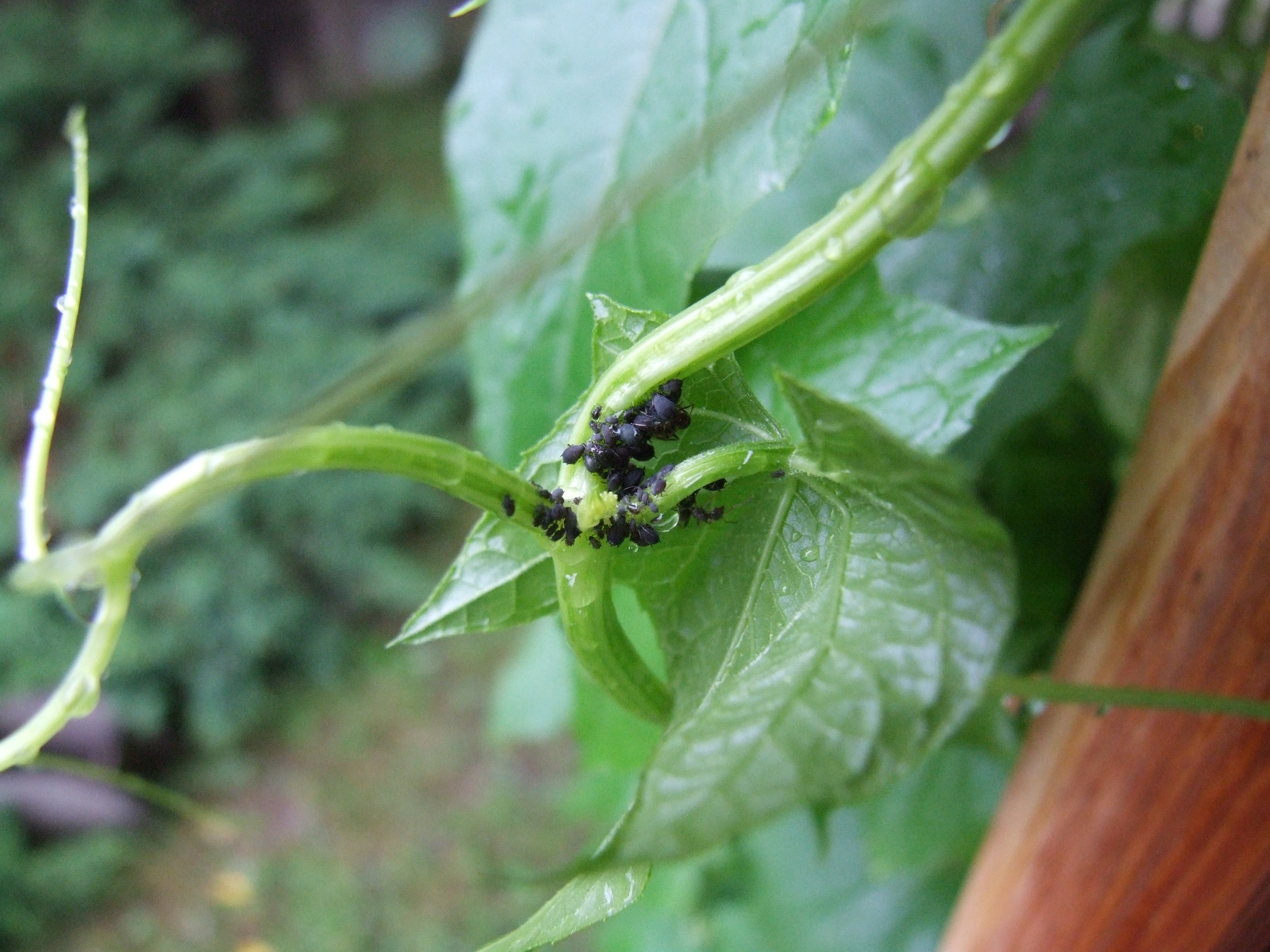
Aphidoidea by Joymaster, 2007

Aphids

Aphids are very common in spring, when plants are growing and are more vulnerable to attack. These aphids mainly attack the underside of young leaves, twigs and leaf buds, which may lead to premature defoliation. Some aphids also attack inflorescences, which can affect the flowering of plants. The damage of aphids in plants comes from their liquid absorption activities. The aphids not only affect the growth of plants, but also secrete a kind of honeydew, which will make the attacked parts of plants become sticky, which will promote the growth of black mold. If the situation is too serious, these twigs need to be trimmed.

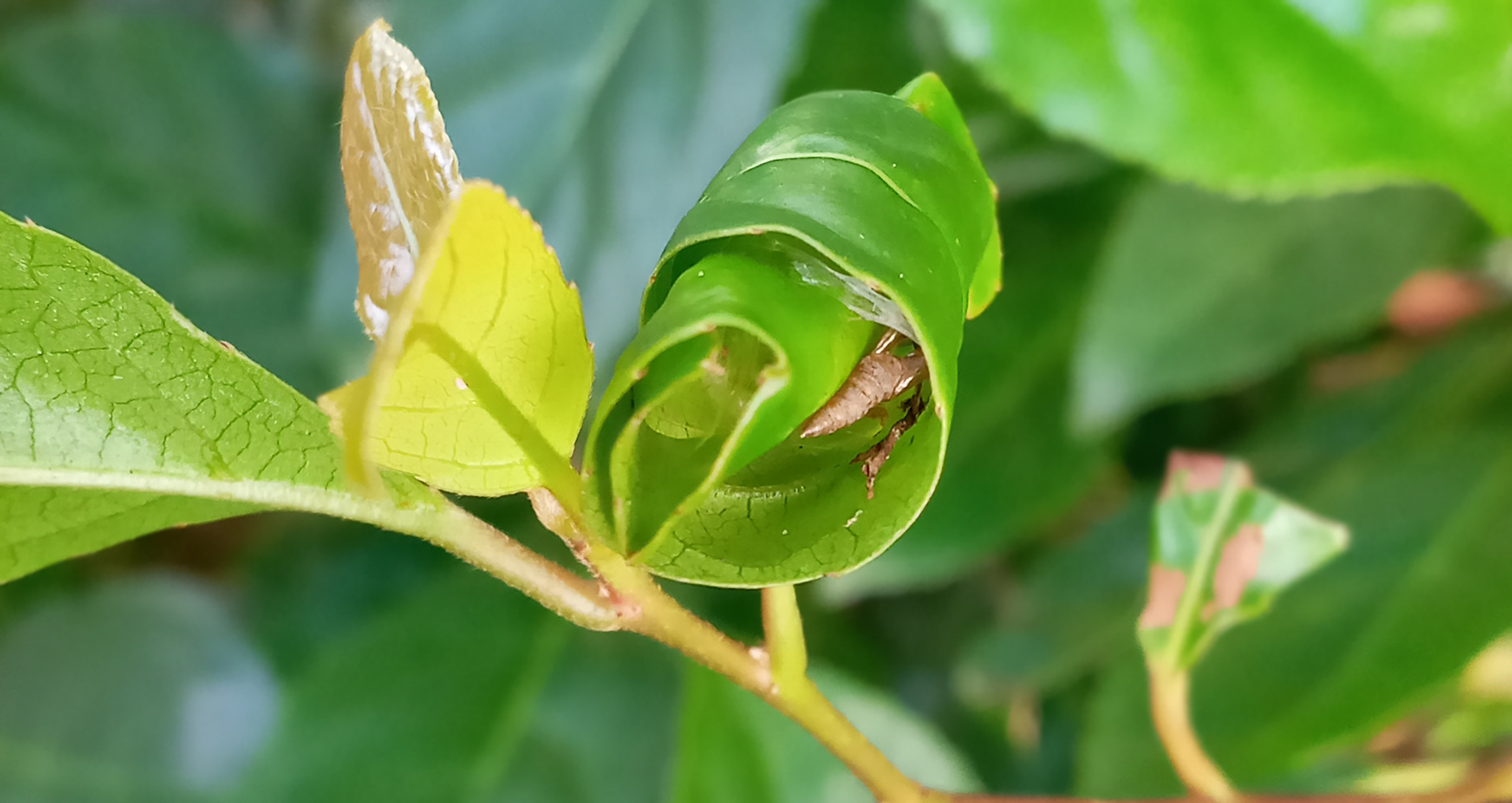
Leaf-rolling weevil nest by Madugrero, 2020

Leaf-rolling and leaf-tying caterpillars

V. odora is the larval host plant for the leaf roller moth Harmologa speciosa. Moth larvae can do a lot of damage to the buds and young leaves as they eat them or curl them up, which can damage the growing branches. These caterpillars reproduce so quickly that if left untreated, the consequences can be serious. People need to pay attention to the hygiene of the garden, and remove the fallen leaves. These actions will reduce the number of overwintering pupae, which will reduce the number of early summer larvae next year.

Diseases

Downy Mildew is a very severe and common disease, and if a plant has it, its leaves and buds distort and change color, eventually turning black. Downy Mildew is most likely to occur between autumn and spring, when the soil and the environment are very wet.

Fusarium wilt causes some twigs to wilt and die, and it spreads quickly and can kill entire bushes in severe cases. If the infection is not serious, people should prune infected branches and spray them with an appropriate fungicide.

Phytophthora root rot often attacks the roots or stems of plants. This causes the leaves to wither or turn yellow, and eventually the whole branch or shrub to die. It usually appears as branchlets or change from yellowish green to brown or black.

Drought

Although the plant has some drought resistance, if exposed to drought for long periods of time, the lower leaves of twigs turn yellow and begin to shed, which continues along the twigs. Once these symptoms occur, people need to water the Veronica to ensure that the root balls are moist.

Frost damage

Veronica odora can tolerate temperatures ranging from -12 to -17 °C, but it can also be affected by frost. This is mainly because the sun hits the frozen plants, causing a sudden rise in temperature and rapid thawing. Stems and leaves are easily affected. When freezing damage is severe, not only individual branches will be affected, but even the whole plant may die.

Rabbits, hares, deer

Rabbits, hares and deer often eat Veronica. These animals are very common in suburban or rural areas, and they bite off the top of plants and cause certain damage to plants. Fences can be built to exclude these animals.

== Further information ==
Veronica odora is a good decorative shrub, and it has been planted in many different places because of its growing habits. It is widely grown in coastal towns because it likes cool summers and mild winters, and can provide beautiful flowers. It is grown in industrial environments because it is an inexpensive ground covering, and easy to grow. As a cold resistant evergreen plant, it is usually planted in the park or back garden, because this round shrub can easily match with other plants in the garden to create a good landscape.
