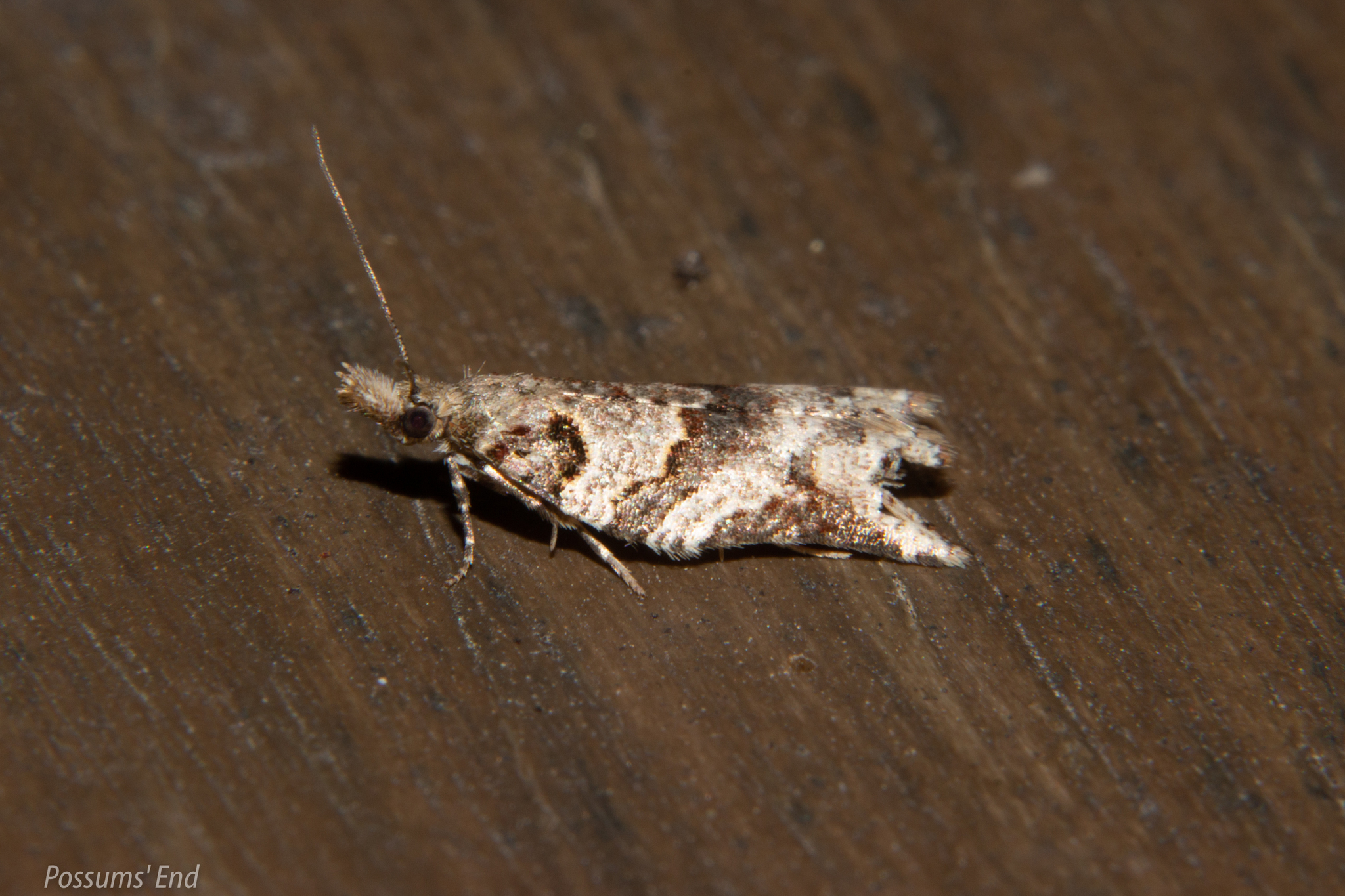
- Harmologa amplexana

Scientific classification
- Kingdom: Animalia
- Phylum: Arthropoda
- Class: Insecta
- Order: Lepidoptera
- Family: Tortricidae
- Tribe: Archipini
- Genus: Harmologa; Meyrick, 1882

Synonyms
- Trachybathra Meyrick, 1907

= Harmologa =

Genus of tortrix moths

Harmologa is a genus of moths belonging to the subfamily Tortricinae of the family Tortricidae.

== Species ==
- Harmologa amplexana (Zeller, 1875)
- Harmologa arenicolor Diakonoff, 1953
- Harmologa columella Meyrick, 1927
- Harmologa festiva Philpott, 1915
- Harmologa oblongana (Walker, 1863)
- Harmologa petrias Meyrick, 1902
- Harmologa pontifica Meyrick, 1911
- Harmologa reticularis Philpott, 1915
- Harmologa sanguinea Philpott, 1915
- Harmologa scoliastis (Meyrick, 1907)
- Harmologa sisyrana Meyrick, 1883
- Harmologa speciosa (Philpott, 1927)
- Harmologa toroterma Hudson, 1925

== See also ==
- List of Tortricidae genera
