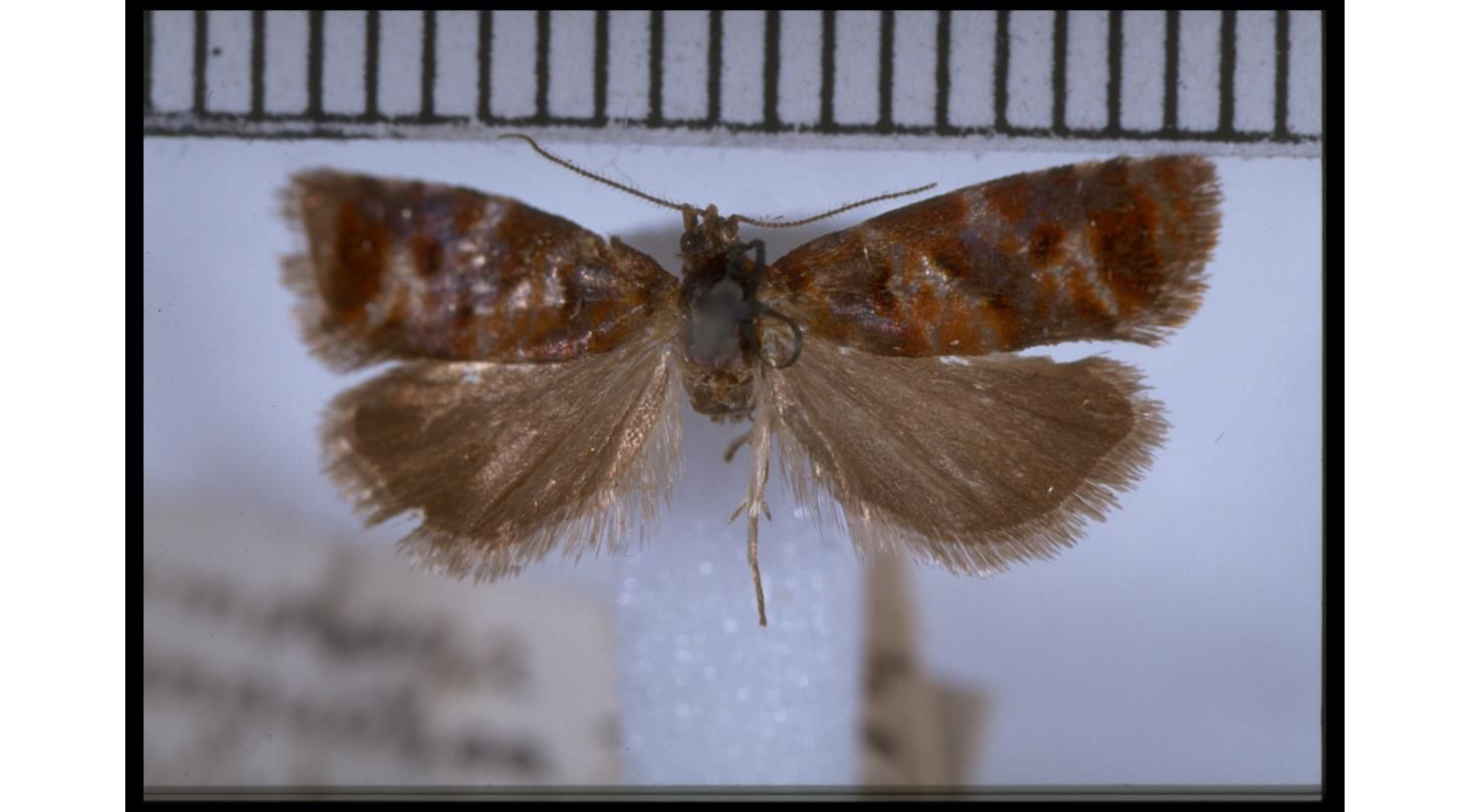
- Male holotype

Scientific classification
- Kingdom: Animalia
- Phylum: Arthropoda
- Clade: Pancrustacea
- Class: Insecta
- Order: Lepidoptera
- Family: Tortricidae
- Genus: Harmologa
- Species: H. sanguinea

Binomial name
- Harmologa sanguinea Philpott, 1915

= Harmologa sanguinea =

Species of moth endemic to New Zealand

Harmologa sanguinea is a species of moth of the family Tortricidae. This species was first described by Alfred Philpott in 1915. It is endemic to New Zealand and has been observed in the southern parts of the South Island including Fiordland, Southland and Otago. Larvae feed on species of Veronica and adults are on the wing in November to March.

== Taxonomy ==
This species was first described by Alfred Philpott in 1915 using specimens collected at using specimens collected at Cleughearn Peak in the Hunter Mountains at around 3000 ft. in January. George Hudson described and illustrated this species in his 1928 publication The butterflies and moths of New Zealand. The male holotype is held at the New Zealand Arthropod Collection.

== Description ==
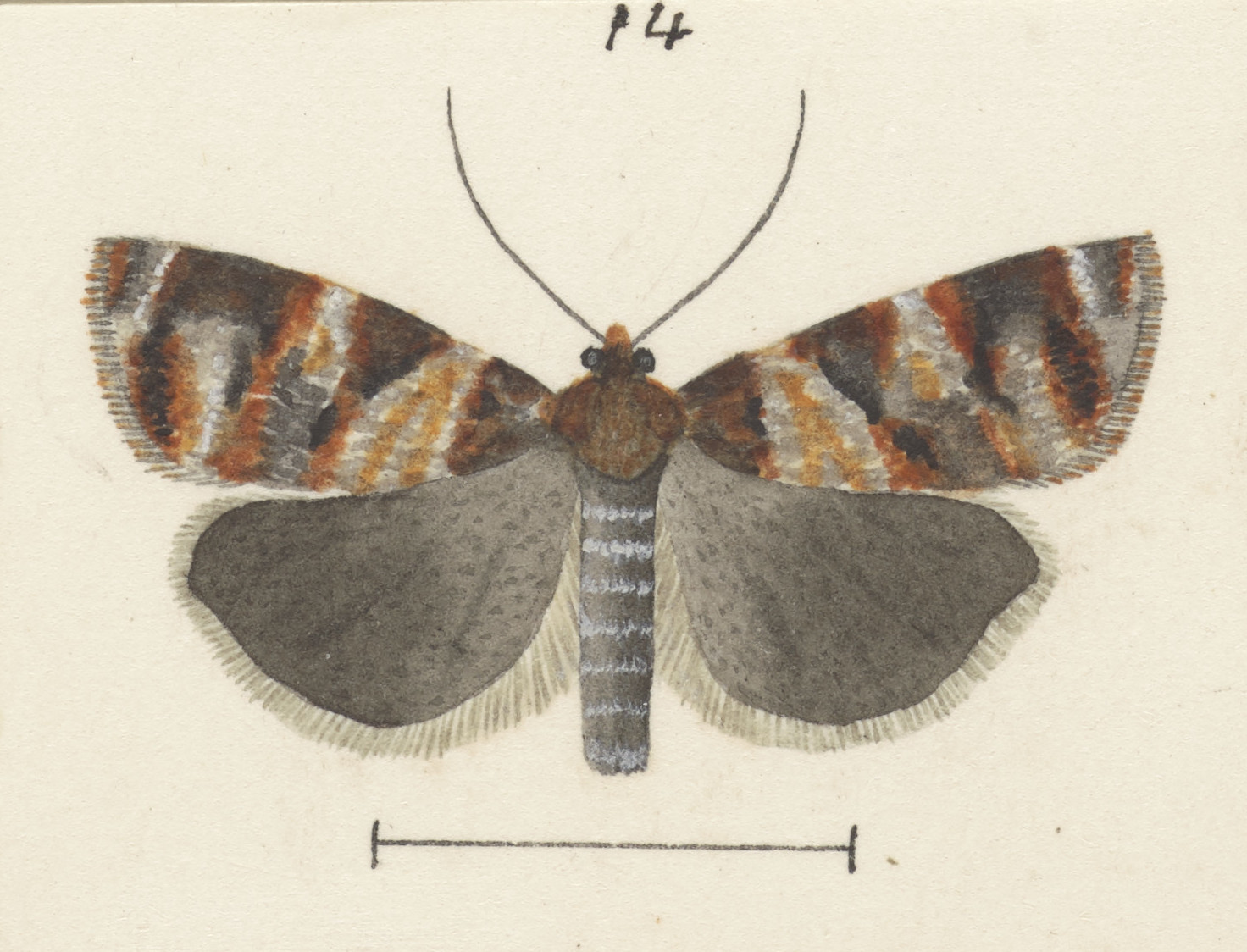
Illustration by Hudson.

Philpott described this species as follows:

♂. 17-18 1/2 mm. Head fuscous mixed with grey. Palpi reddish-brown. Antennae fuscous ringed with oclireous, filiations 1 1/2. Thorax brownish-red mixed with grey. Abdomen pale fuscous, segmental margins grey. Forewings elongate, costa moderately arched, apex subacute, termen rounded, slightly oblique; dark purplish-red; margin of basal patch oblique, almost straight, from 1/5 to 1/3 ; followed by a shining silvery fascia much intermixed with yellow or orange, its outer margin from just beyond costal patch, very oblique to 3/4, thence less oblique to dorsum at 1/2; a similarly coloured median fascia, rather broad, narrowest on costa, usually becoming obsolete at middle; a similar fascia from tornus, rather oblique inwardly to middle, thence bent acutely downwards and inwards, sometimes obscurely touching median fascia; an obscure subterminal fascia from before apex obliquely to termen at middle : cilia greyish-fuscous mixed with some reddish and with two darker lines. Hindwings dark fuscous : cilia grey with a darker line.

H. sanguinea can be distinguished from similar looking moths as result of differences in tornal and subterminal fasciae.

== Distribution ==
This species is endemic to New Zealand and has been observed in Fiordland. It has also been observed at the Eyre Ecological District in Southland, as well as on Maungatua and Flat Top Mountain in the Otago Region.

== Habitat and hosts ==
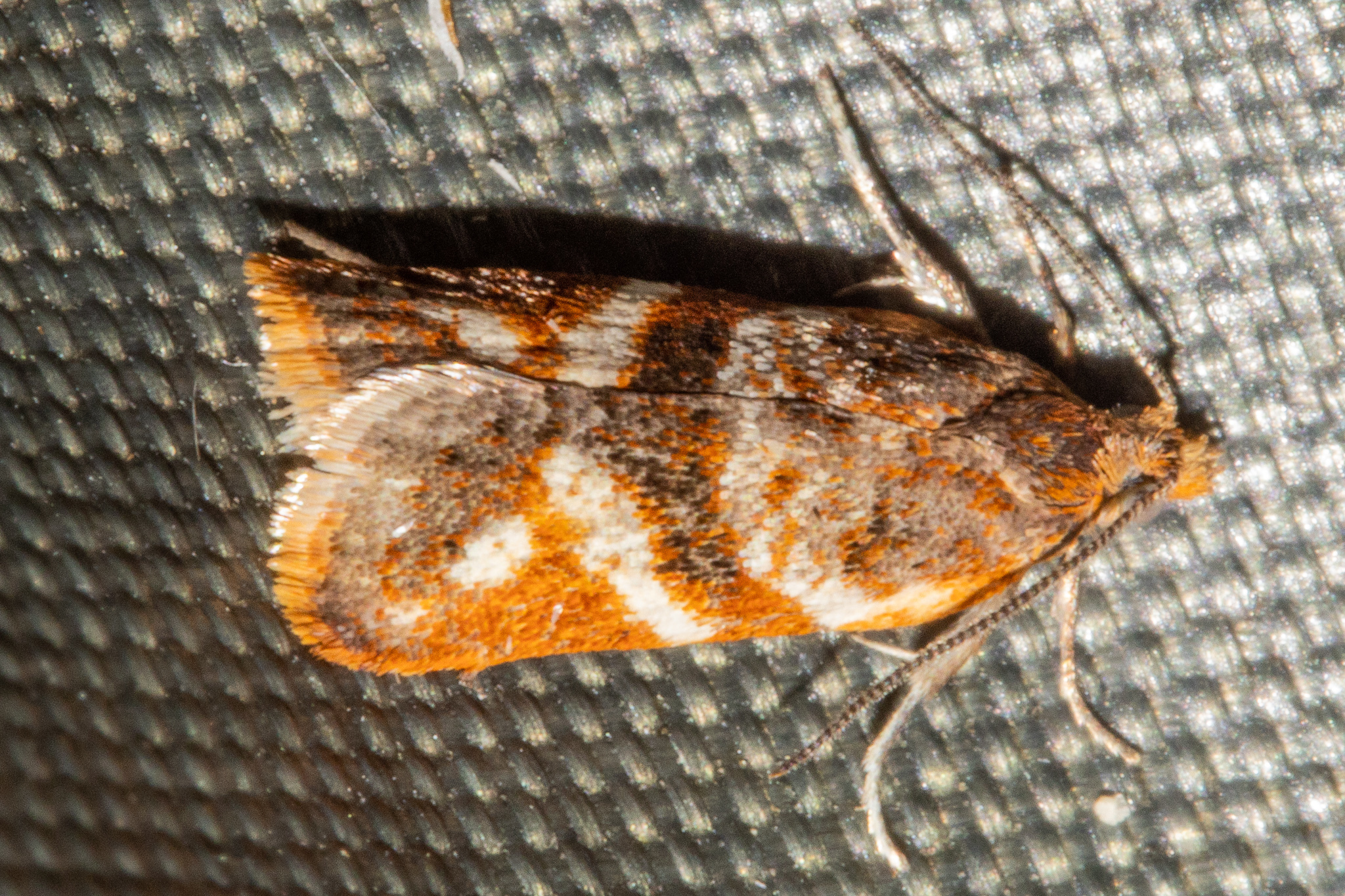
H. sanguinea caught by day in Hebe shrubs on the edge of a wetland.

This species inhabits subalpine habitat. The larval plant host of this moth are species in the genus Veronica.

== Behaviour ==
Adults are on the wing from November to March and have been observed flying amongst Veronica and Cassinia plants.
