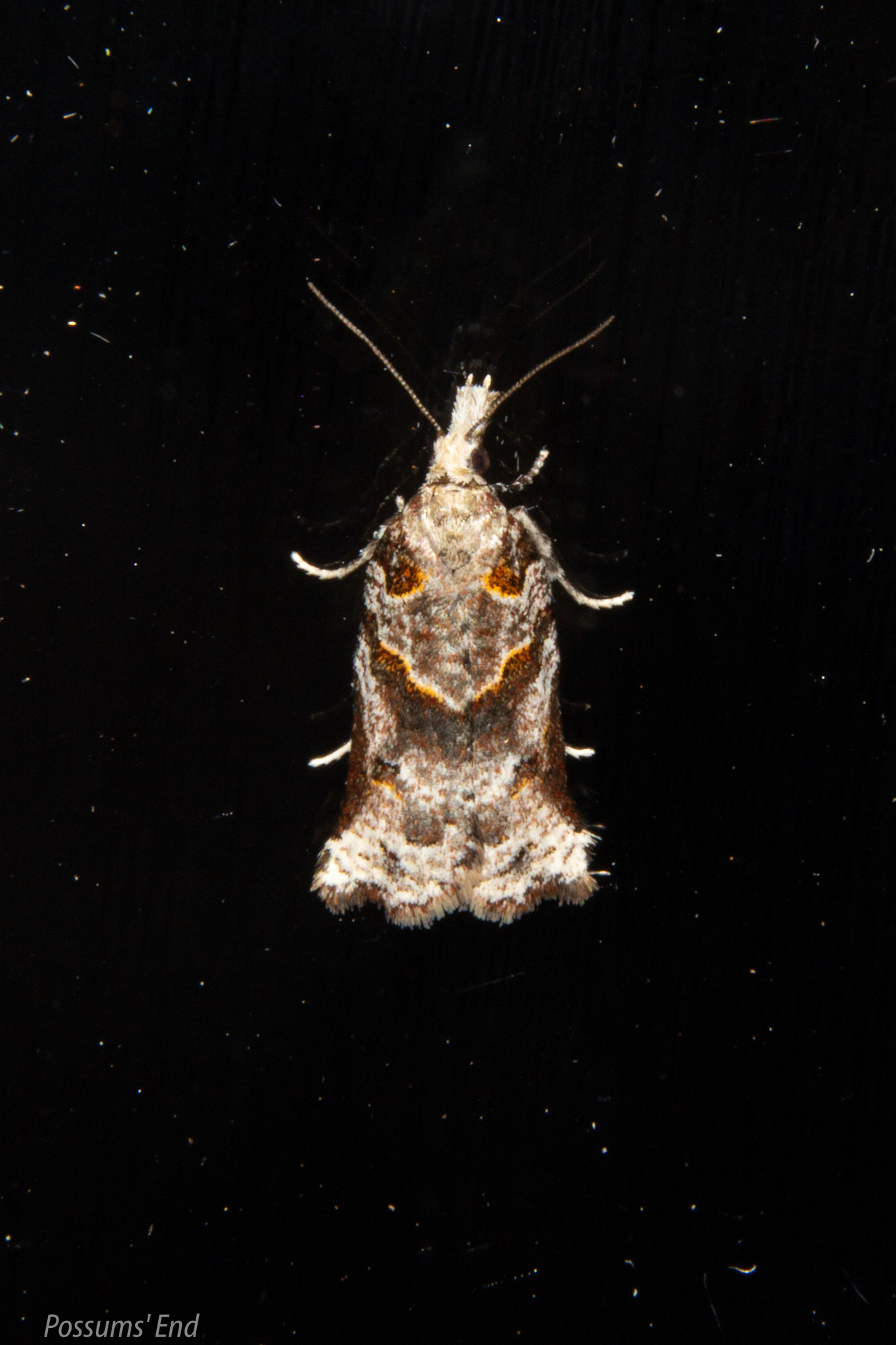

Scientific classification
- Kingdom: Animalia
- Phylum: Arthropoda
- Clade: Pancrustacea
- Class: Insecta
- Order: Lepidoptera
- Family: Tortricidae
- Genus: Harmologa
- Species: H. amplexana

Binomial name
- Harmologa amplexana (Zeller, 1875)

Synonyms
- Idiographis amplexana Zeller, 1875; Tortrix amplexana (Zeller, 1875); Cacoecia amplexana (Zeller, 1875); Cacoecia vilis Butler, 1877

= Harmologa amplexana =

Species of moth endemic to New Zealand

Harmologa amplexana is a species of moth of the family Tortricidae. This species was first described by Phillipp Christoph Zeller in 1875. It is endemic to New Zealand and is found from the middle of the North Island down to and including the Otago region in the South Island. It inhabits native forest as well as cultivated gardens. The larval host plants are Muehlenbeckia complexa and Olearia odorata. The larvae make webs of silk amongst the leaf litter of their hosts and feed on the same. The larvae are parasitised by the New Zealand endemic wasp Eupsenella insulana. Adults are commonly on the wing from September until April and during the day can be disturbed from native vegetation. Adults are attracted to light.

== Taxonomy ==
This species was first described by Phillipp Christoph Zeller in 1875 and named Idiographis amplexana. In 1877, Arthur Gardiner Butler, thinking he was describing a new species, named this moth Cacoecia vilis. In 1881 Edward Meyrick placed this species in the genus Cacoecia and synonymised C. vilis. In 1883 Meyrick placed this species in the genus Harmologa. George Hudson, in this 1928 publication The butterflies and moths of New Zealand, followed Meyrick and used the name Harmologa amplexana when describing and illustrating this species. The male lectotype specimen, the provenance of which is unknown, is held at the Natural History Museum, London.

== Description ==
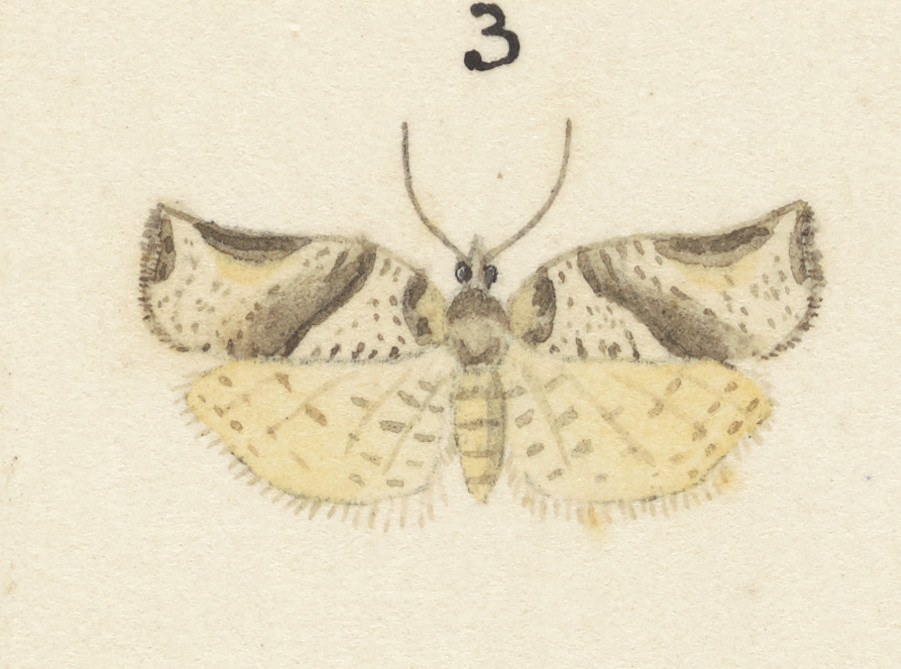
Hudson's illustration of female.

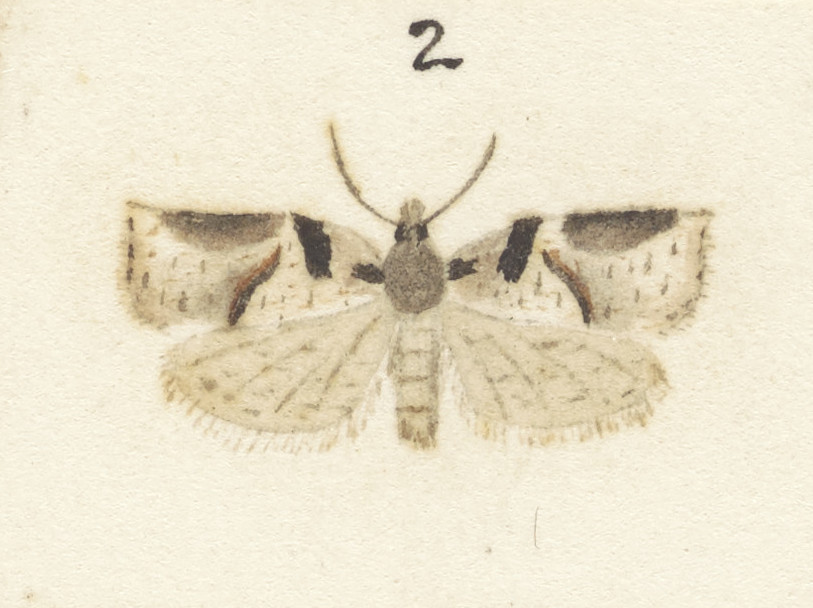
Hudson's illustration of male.

Hudson described this species as follows:

The expansion of the wings of the male is slightly under 3/4 inch, of the female slightly over 3/4 inch. The fore- wings of the male have the costa strongly arched at the base, the apex pointed and the termen curved; in the female the costa is very strongly arched at the base, becoming concave before the apex, which is very prominent, the termen being very strongly bowed outwards; very pale ochreous with brown markings; there is a narrow, very dark band from 1/4 of costa extending obliquely inwards to the disc, thence abruptly to the base—this marking is smaller, fainter and much more curved in the female; an oblique band from before the middle of the costa to the middle of the dorsum, Sharply defined towards the base, shaded towards the termen, but obsolete towards the costa in the male; an elongate curved mark on the costa from the middle almost to the apex, much larger and touching the central band in the male; several small markings near the termen, including a brownish-patch near the middle edged towards the termen with from two to four blackish dots; in both sexes the whole wing is very finely dotted and streaked with minute brown marks. The hind-wings are pale yellowish-ochreous with grey mottling.

Meyrick stated that this species differs from all other Australian and New Zealand species in the produced apex and excavated hindmargin of the forewings as well as the angulated dark streak beneath basal portion of costa.

== Distribution ==
H. amplexana is endemic to New Zealand. This species is found from the centre of the North Island down to and including the Otago region of the South Island.

== Habitat and hosts ==
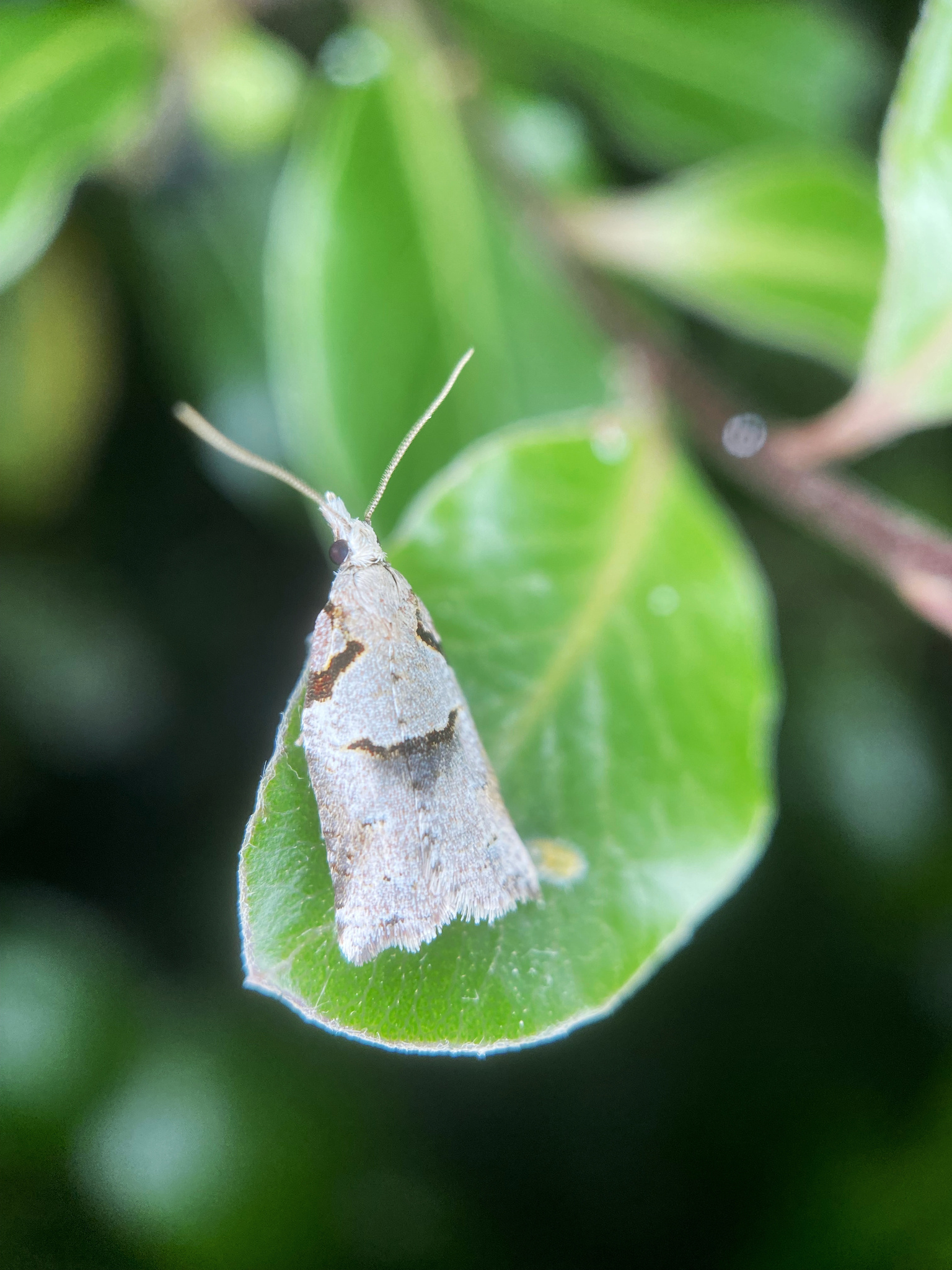

This species inhabits both native forests as well as cultivated gardens. The larval host plants are Muehlenbeckia complexa and Olearia odorata.

== Behaviour ==
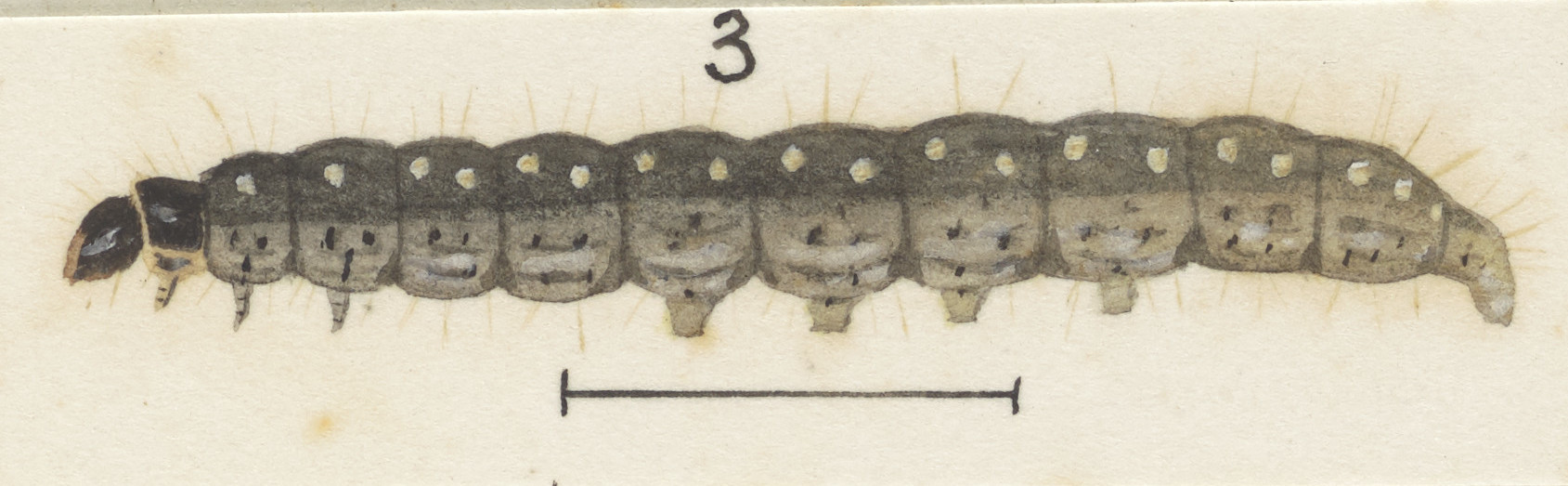
Illustration of larva.

Larvae of this species create silken webs amongst leaf litter and then feed on the same. Adults are on the wing from September until April and are attracted to light. During the day adult H. amplexana can be disturbed from native vegetation.

== Enemies ==
Larvae of H. amplexana are the hosts of and are parasitised by the New Zealand endemic wasp Eupsenella insulana.
