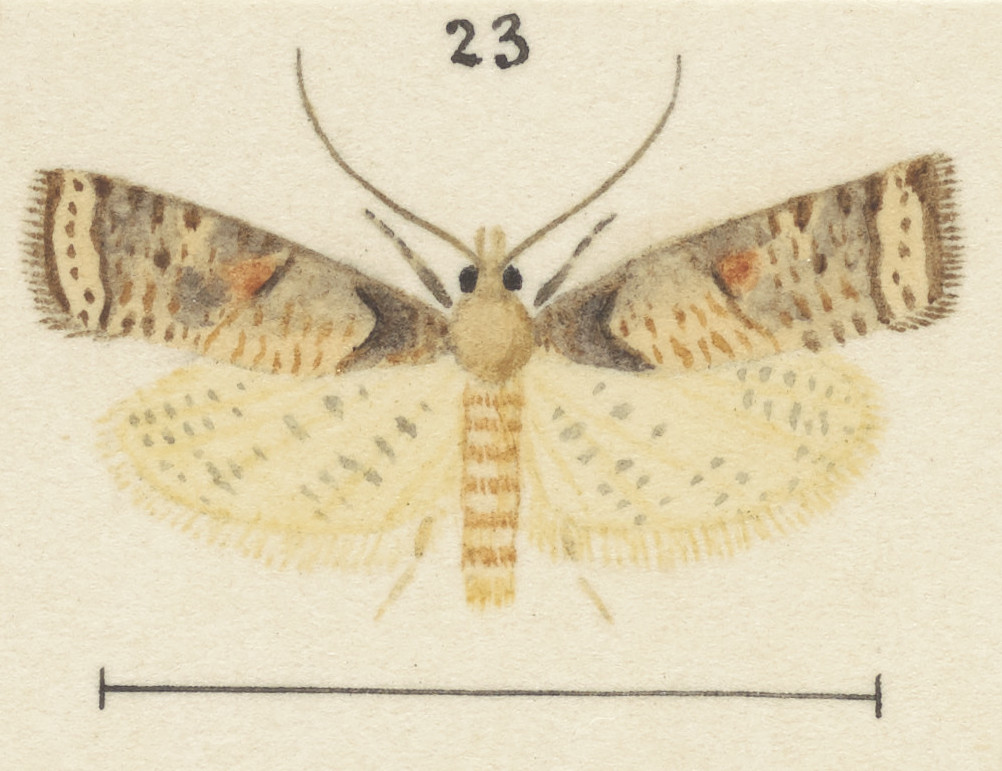

Scientific classification
- Kingdom: Animalia
- Phylum: Arthropoda
- Class: Insecta
- Order: Lepidoptera
- Family: Tortricidae
- Genus: Harmologa
- Species: H. toroterma

Binomial name
- Harmologa toroterma Hudson, 1925

= Harmologa toroterma =

Species of moth endemic to New Zealand

Harmologa toroterma is a species of moth of the family Tortricidae. This species was first described by George Hudson in 1925. It is endemic to New Zealand, where it has been recorded in Central Otago on the South Island as well as possibly in the Nokomai Range near Garston. Adults are on the wing in February and possibly also in March. It is said to be an autumn emerging species.

== Taxonomy ==
This species was first described by George Hudson in 1925 using a specimen collected by Charles E. Clarke in Mount Ida, Central Otago, in February. Hudson went on to discuss and illustrate this species in his 1928 book The butterflies and moths of New Zealand. This species is regarded as being taxonomically unresolved as it likely belongs to another genus. It is therefore also known as Harmologa (s.l.) toroterma. The male holotype is held at Te Papa.

== Description ==
Hudson described this species as follows:

The expansion of the wings is almost 1 inch. The fore-wings are elongate-oblong, with the termen almost straight; pale brownish-ochreous, with numerous brown and yellowish-brown transverse strigulae; a faint suffused purplish-grey basal patch, its outer edge strongly angulated and partly outlined in blackish; another suffused triangular patch on costa before middle, having at its apex a cloudy reddish-brown discal spot; a very distinct, fine wavy subterminal line, having beyond it a broad pale terminal band containing a row of brown dots; the cilia are pale brown, with darker basal line. The hindwings are pale ochreous, with several series of faint grey spots; the cilia are pale ochreous.

== Distribution ==
This species is endemic to New Zealand. It has been observed in Central Otago and possibly Southland.

== Behaviour ==
This species has been collected on the wing in February and possibly March. It is said to be an autumn emerging species and was also possibly collected on the Nokomai Range about Garston at 1100 m in March 1987.
