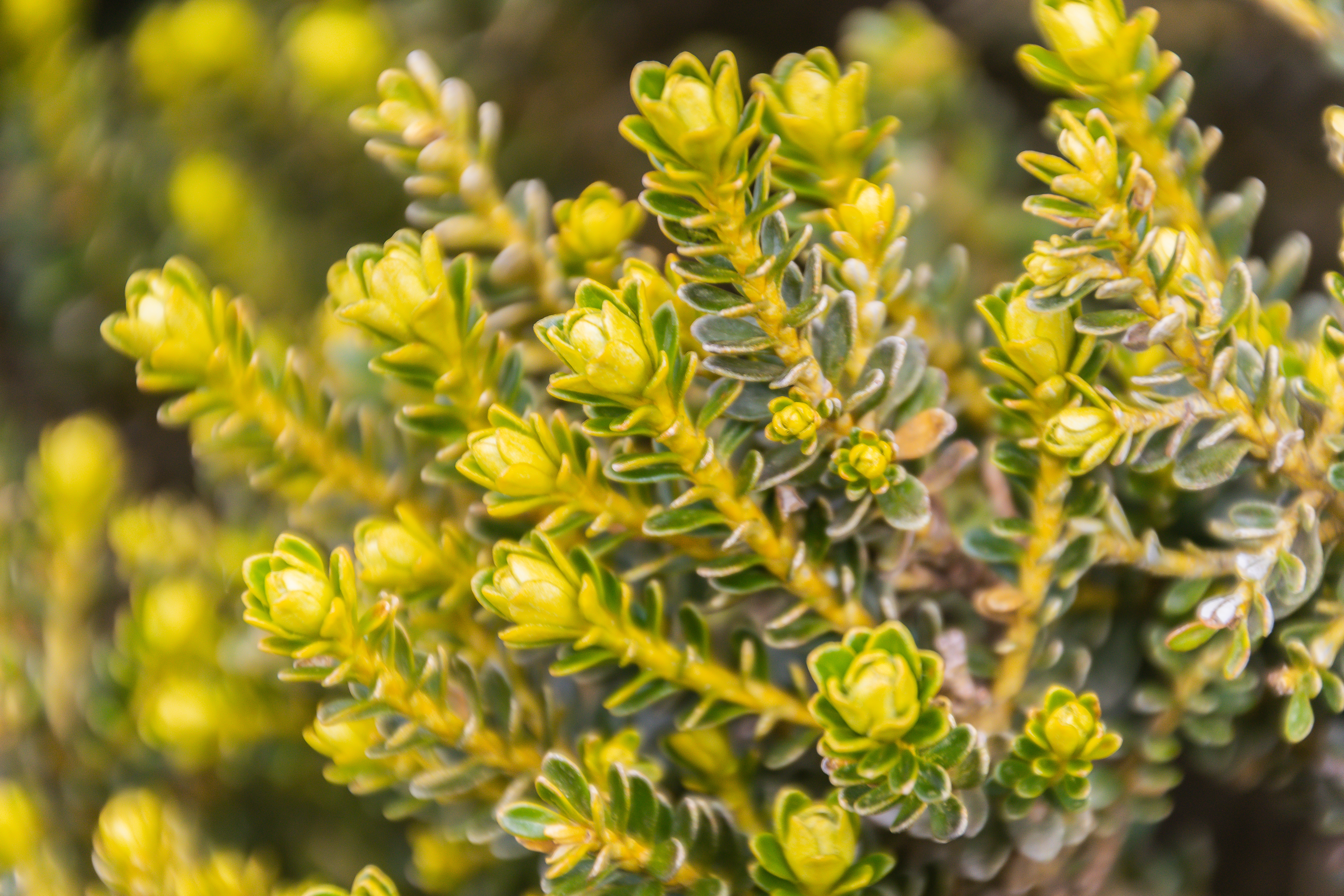

Scientific classification
- Kingdom: Plantae
- Clade: Tracheophytes
- Clade: Angiosperms
- Clade: Eudicots
- Clade: Asterids
- Order: Asterales
- Family: Asteraceae
- Genus: Ozothamnus
- Species: O. vauvilliersii

Binomial name
- Ozothamnus vauvilliersii (Hook.f.) Hombr. & Jacquinot ex Decne.

Synonyms
- Cassinia vauvilliersii Hook 1852; Cassinia vauvilliersii var. pallida Allan 1961; Olearia xanthophylla Colenso 1888

= Ozothamnus vauvilliersii =

Species of shrub

Ozothamnus vauvilliersii is a species of shrub in the family Asteraceae, native to New Zealand.

== Description ==
This is an evergreen shrub that reaches up to 6 ft (1.8 m) in height and has yellowish-white leaves. The numerous flowers are small and white.

== Range ==
The species is present throughout New Zealand.
