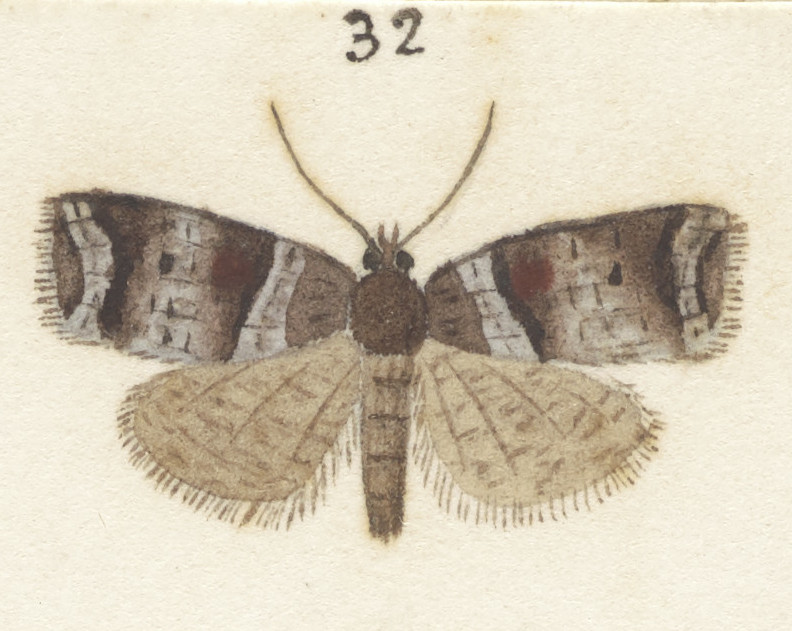

Scientific classification
- Kingdom: Animalia
- Phylum: Arthropoda
- Class: Insecta
- Order: Lepidoptera
- Family: Tortricidae
- Genus: Harmologa
- Species: H. pontifica

Binomial name
- Harmologa pontifica Meyrick, 1911

= Harmologa pontifica =

Species of moth

Harmologa pontifica is a species of moth of the family Tortricidae. It is found in New Zealand.

The wingspan is about 21 mm. The forewings are greyish with ashy-purplish reflections, sprinkled with dark fuscous and some whitish scales. The costal fold is dark fuscous. The hindwings are grey, but darker posteriorly.
