= Botany of Lord Auckland's Group and Campbell's Island =

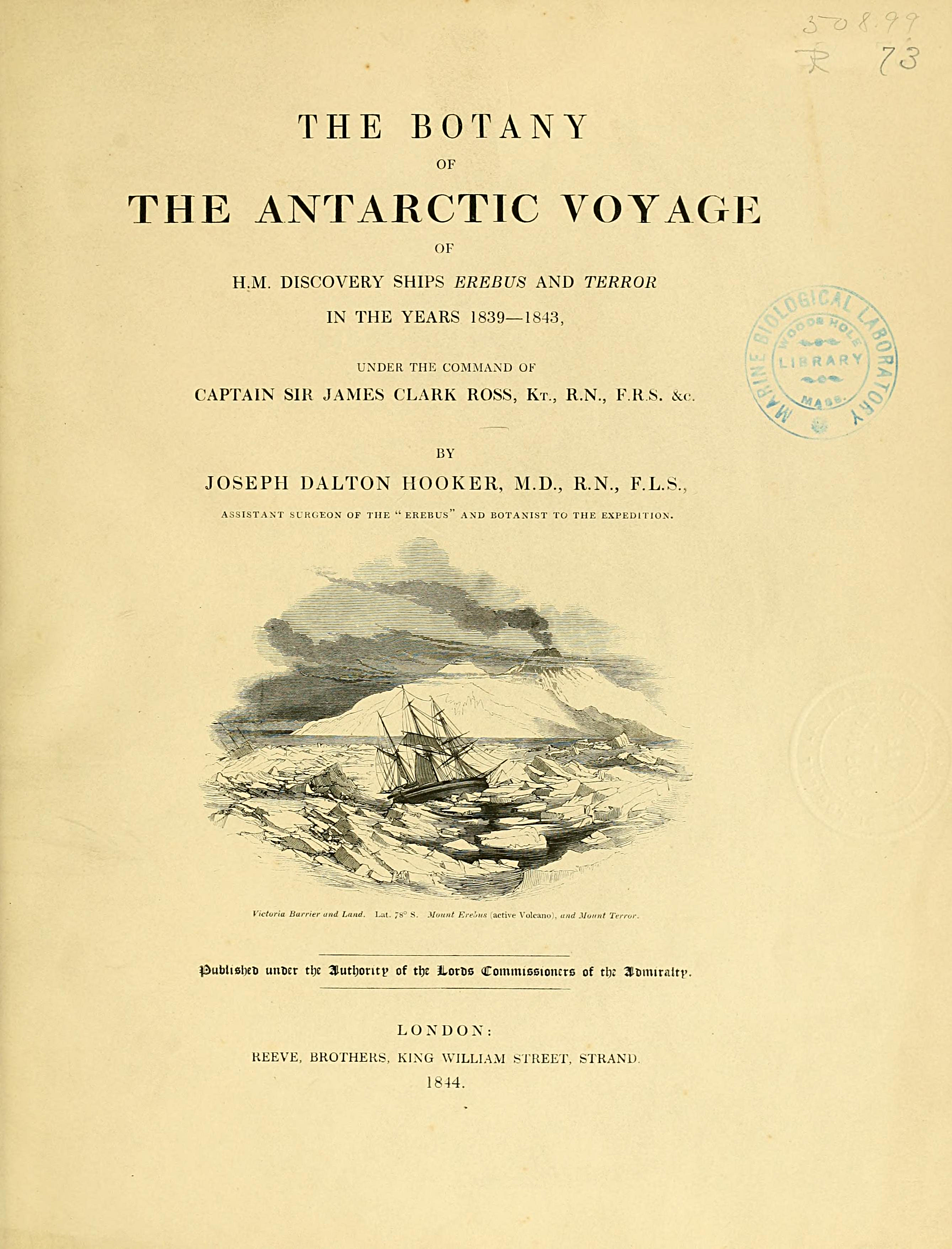
- Title page with an etching of the Victoria Barrier with Mount Erebus and Mount Terror
- Author: Joseph Dalton Hooker
- Illustrator: Walter Hood Fitch
- Language: English
- Series: Monthly parts
- Subject: Botany
- Publisher: Reeve Brothers
- Publication date: 1844–1845
- Publication place: England

The Botany of Lord Auckland's Group and Campbell's Island is a description of the plants discovered in those islands during the Ross expedition written by Joseph Dalton Hooker and published by Reeve Brothers in London between 1844 and 1845. Hooker sailed on HMS Erebus as assistant surgeon. It was the first in a series of four Floras in the Flora Antarctica, the others being the Botany of Fuegia, the Falklands, Kerguelen's Land, Etc. (1845–1847), the Flora Novae-Zelandiae (1851–1853), and the Flora Tasmaniae (1853–1859). They were "splendidly" illustrated by Walter Hood Fitch.

The larger part of the plant specimens collected during the Ross expedition are now part of the Kew Herbarium.

== Context ==
The British government fitted out an expedition led by James Clark Ross to investigate magnetism and marine geography in high southern latitudes, which sailed with two ships, HMS Terror and HMS Erebus on 29 September 1839 from Chatham.

The ships arrived, after several stops, at the Cape of Good Hope on 4 April 1840. On 21 April the giant kelp Macrocystis pyrifera was found off Marion Island, but no landfall could be made there or on the Crozet Islands due to the harsh winds. On 12 May the ships anchored at Christmas Harbour for two and a half months, during which all the plant species previously encountered by James Cook on the Kerguelen Islands were collected. On 16 August they reached the River Derwent, remaining in Tasmania until 12 November. A week later the flotilla stopped at Lord Auckland's Islands and Campbell's Island for the spring months.

Large floating forests of Macrocystis and Durvillaea were found until the ships ran into icebergs at latitude 61° S. Pack-ice was met at 68° S and longitude 175°. During this part of the voyage Victoria Land, Mount Erebus and Mount Terror were discovered. After returning to Tasmania for three months, the flotilla went via Sydney to the Bay of Islands, and stayed for three months in New Zealand to collect plants there. After visiting other islands, the ships returned to the Cape of Good Hope on 4 April 1843. At the end of the journey specimens of some fifteen hundred plant species had been collected and preserved.

== Species ==
According to Hooker, the flora of the islands south of Tasmania and New Zealand is related to that of New Zealand and bears no likeness to that of Australia. On the Auckland Islands wood grows near the sea and consists of the tree Metrosideros umbellata intermixed with woody Dracophyllum, Coprosma, hebes and Panax. These are undergrown by many ferns. Higher up grow alpines. On the Campbell Islands brushwood is limited to narrow bays which are relatively sheltered. These islands are steeper and rocky and have bear less vegetation, primarily grasses.

Plants collected by Hooker from Auckland and Campbell Islands are listed below. Species described by him should be cited with his acronym Hook.f. (Hooker filius), but this has not been applied here for brevity. Species already described by other authors are indicated though. Where applicable and as far as possible, the corrected botanical names, and the currently accepted name have been indicated accompanied by the abbreviated author names.

=== Seedplants ===
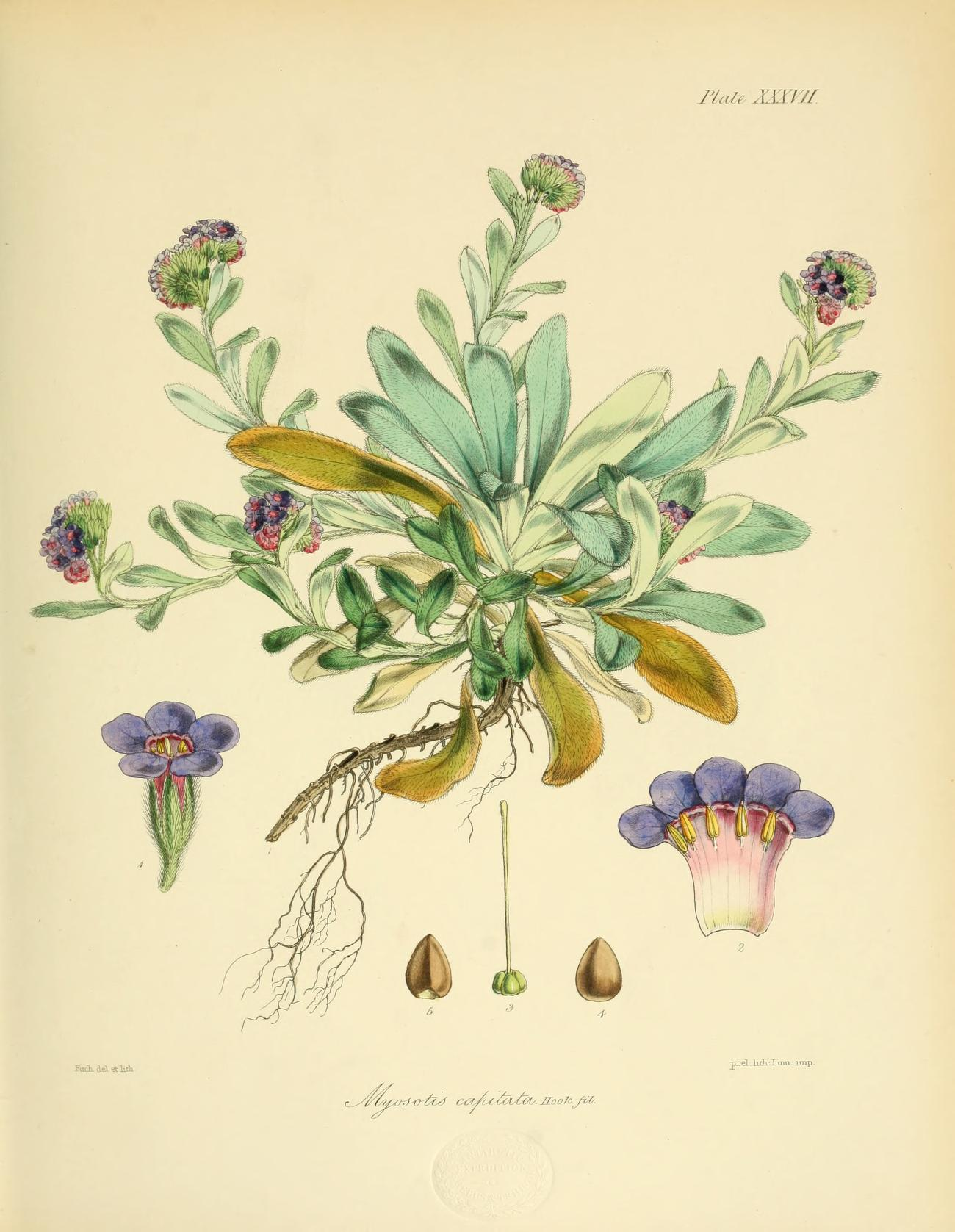
Myosotis capitata (Plate XXXVII)

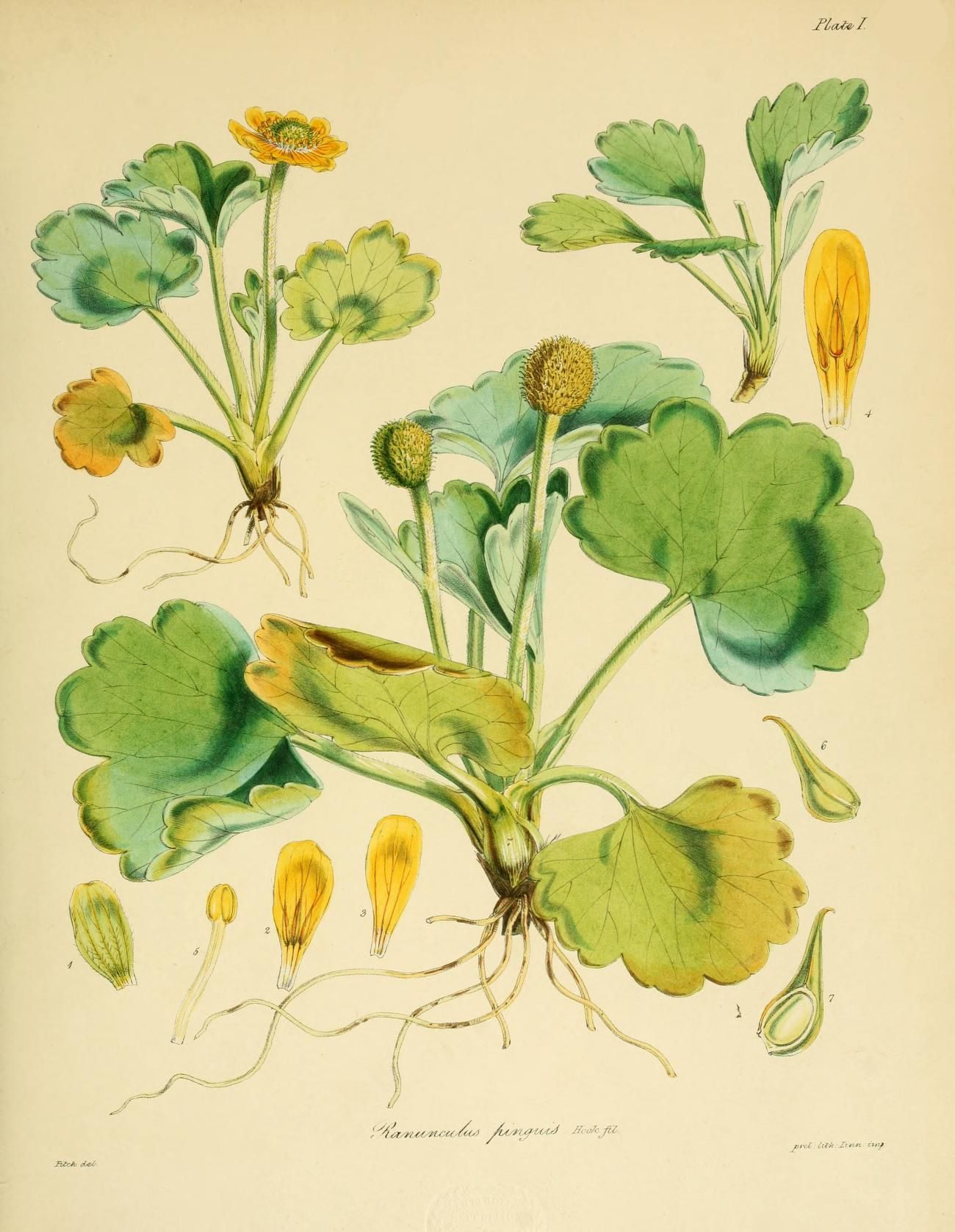
Ranunculus pinguis (Plate I)

The following seedplants are described by Hooker in Flora Antarctica.

- Acaena adscendens Vahl.
- Acaena sanguisorbae Vahl. var. minor
- Agrostris aucklandica
- Agrostris leptostachys
- Agrostris multicaulis
- Agrostris subulata
- Androstoma empetrifolia
- Anisotome antipoda
- Anisotome latifolia
- Astelia linearis
- Bromus antarcticus = Chionochloa antarctica (Hook.f.) Zotov
- Chrysobactron rossii = Bulbinella rossii (Hook.f.) Cheeseman
- Bulliardia moschata D’Urv.
- Callitriche verna DC. var. terrestris = Callitriche palustris var. palustris
- Cardamine corymbosa
- Cardamine depressa
- Cardamine hirsuta L. var. subcarnosa
- Cardamine stellata
- Carex appressa R.Br.
- Carex ternate G.Forst.
- Carex trifida Cav.
- Catabrosa antarctica
- Celmisia vernicosa = Damnamenia vernicosa (Hook.f.) Given
- Ceratella rosulata
- Chiloglottis cornuta
- Colobanthus billardieri = C. quitensis (Kunth) Bartl.
- Colobanthus muscoides
- Colobanthus subulatus (d’Urv.) Hook.f.
- Coprosma affinis
- Coprosma ciliata
- Coprosma cuneata
- Coprosma foetidissima G.Forst.
- Coprosma myrtillifolia
- Coprosma repens
- Dracophyllum longifolium R.Br.
- Dracophyllum scoparium
- Epilobium confertifolium
- Epilobium linnaeoides
- Epilobium nerterioides A. Cunn.
- Festuca foliosa
- Festuca scoparia
- Forstera clavigera
- Gaimardia ciliata
- Gaimardia pallida
- Gentiana cerina
- Gentiana concinna
- Geranium microphyllum
- Helichrysum prostratum
- Hierochloe brunonis
- Hierochloe redolens R.Br.
- Isolepis aucklandica
- Juncus antarcticus
- Juncus scheuchzerioides Gaudich. var. inconspicuous
- Leptinella lanata
- Leptinella plumosa
- Leptinella propinqua
- Luzula crinita
- Metrosideros lucida = M. umbellata Cav.
- Montia fontana L.
- Myosotis antarctica
- Myosotis capitata
- Nertera depressa Banks
- Oreobolus pectinatus
- Ozothamnus vauvilliersii Hombr. & Jacq.
- Panax simplex G.Forst.
- Plantago aucklandica
- Plantago carnosa
- Pleurophyllum criniferum
- Pleurophyllum speciosum
- Poa annua L. (introduced)
- Poa breviglumis
- Poa ramosissima
- Pozoa reniformis
- Pratia arenaria
- Ranunculus acaulis Banks & Sol.
- Ranunculus pinguis
- Ranunculus subscaposus
- Rostkovia gracilis
- Rostkovia magellanica (Lam.) Hook.f.
- Rumex cuneifolius Campd. var. alismaefolius
- Sieversia albiflora
- Stellaria decipiens
- Stellaria media (L.) Vill. (introduced)
- Aralia polaris = Stylbocarpa polaris (Hombr. & Jacq. ex Hook.f.) A.Gray
- Suttonnia divaricata
- Suttonnia tenuifolia
- Thelymitra stenoperala
- Trineuron spathulatum
- Trisetum subspicatum Beauv.
- Uncinia hookeri Boott
- Urtica australis
- Urtica aucklandica
- Veronica benthami
- Veronica elliptica
- Veronica odora Hook.f.

=== Ferns and clubmosses ===
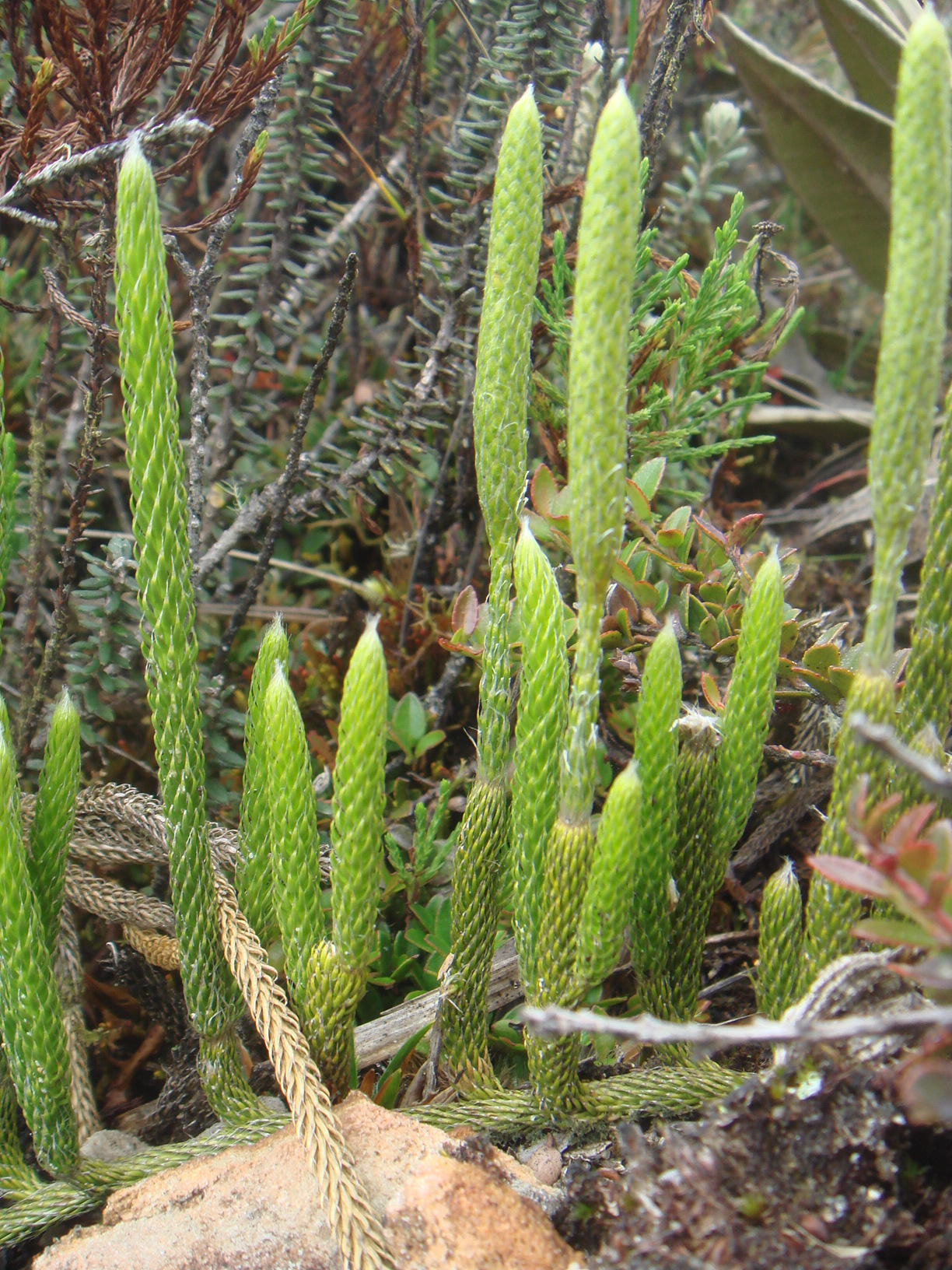
Lycopodium clavatum is a cosmopolitan species

The following ferns and clubmosses are described by Hooker in Flora Antarctica from the Auckland and Campbell Islands.

- Three Asplenium species:
  - A. flaccidum G.Forst.
  - A. obtusatum G.Forst.
  - A. scleroprium Hombr. & Jacq.
- Lomaria lanceolata = Blechnum lanceolatum (R.Br.) Sturm
- L. procera = B. procerum
- Polypodium grammitidis = Ctenopteris heterophylla (Labill.) Tindale
- Grammitis australis = G. billardierei Willd.
- Pteris vespertilionis = Histiopteris incisa (Thunb.) J.Sm.
- five Hymenophyllum species:
  - H. demissum
  - H. flabellatum Lab.
  - H. minimum A.Rich.
  - H. multifidum
  - H. rarum R.Br.
- Three species of Lycopodium:
  - L. clavatum L.
  - L. scariosum Forst.
  - L. varium = Huperzia varia (R.Br.) Trevis.
- Polypodium viscidum Spreng. = Hypolepis rufobarbata (Colenso) N.A.Wakef.
- Phymatodes billardierei = Polypodium phymatodes L.
- Aspidium venustum = Polystichum vestitum (G.Forst.) C.Presl
- Schizaea australis = Schizaea fistulosa Labill.

=== Mosses ===
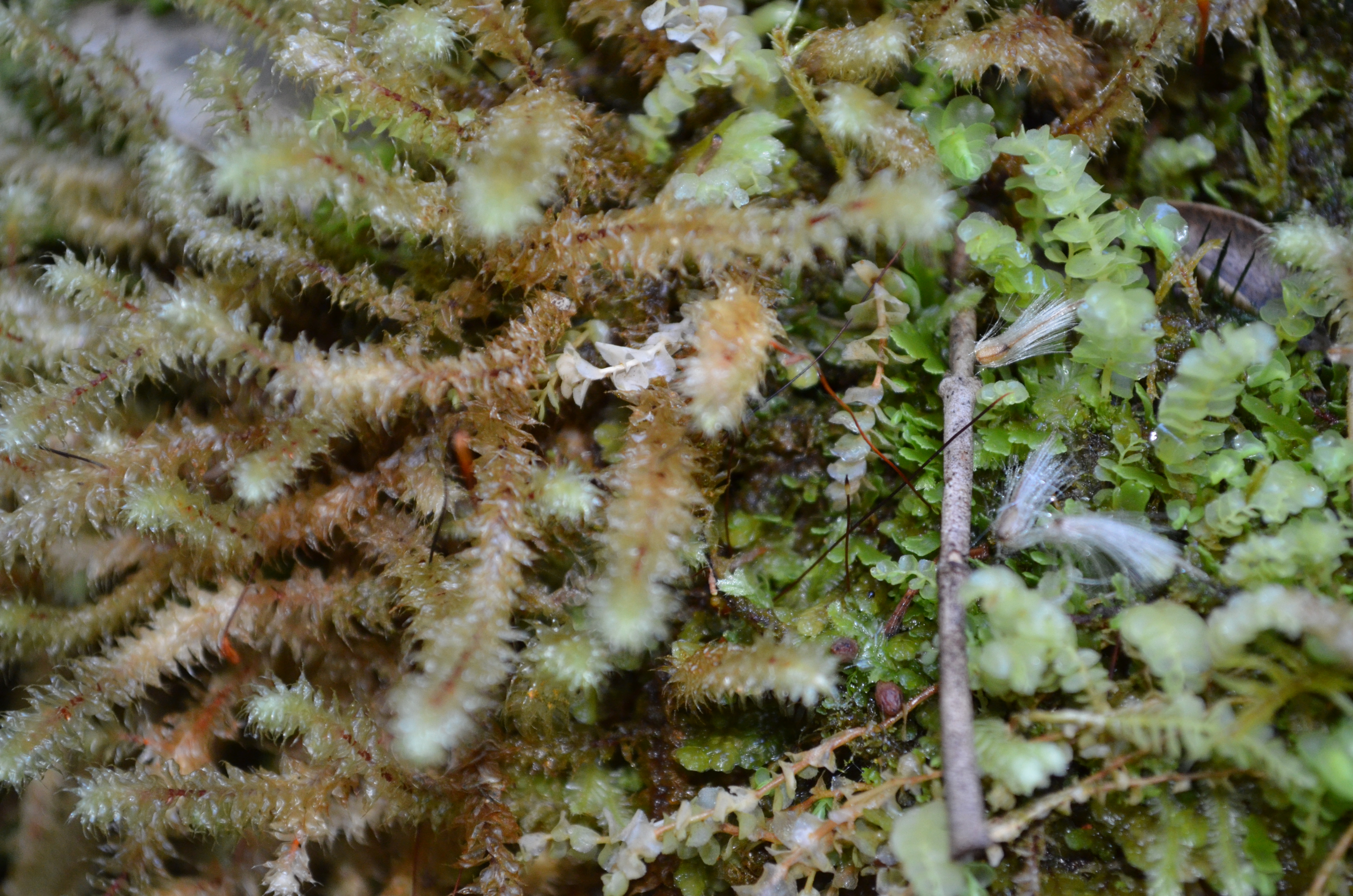
The species Hypnum aciculare found on Auckland's Islands is now called Ptychomnion aciculare

The following mosses are described by Hooker in Flora Antarctica from the Auckland and Campbell Islands.

- Four species of the genus Andreaea:
  - A. acutifolia Hook.f. & Wils.
  - A. mutabilis Hook.f. & Wils.
  - A. nitida Hook.f. & Wils.
  - A. subulata Harvey
- Anoectangium humboldti = Rhacocarpus purpurascens (Brid.) Paris
- Three Bartramia species:
  - B. patens
  - B. pendula = Breutelia pendula
  - B. robusta = B. patens var. robusta (Hook. f. & Wilson) Matteri
- Bryum annulatum = Gemmabryum dichotomum (Hedw.) J.R. Spence & H.P. Ramsay
- B. blandum Hook.f. & Wils.
- B. nutans = Pohlia nutans (Hedw.) Lindb.
- B. truncorum = B. billardieri (Brid.) Brid.
- B. wahlenbergii = Pohlia wahlenbergii (F.Weber & D.Mohr) A.L.Andrews
- Two species of Campylopus:
  - C. flexuosus (Rusty Swan-neck Moss)
  - C. introflexus
- Ceratodon purpureus (Hedw.) Brid.
- Conostomum australe = C. pentastichum (Brid.) Lindb.
- Four species of Dicranum, now assigned to Dicranoloma:
  - D. billardieri Schwaeg. = Dicranoloma billarderii (Brid.) Paris
  - D. menziesii = Dicranoloma menziesii (Tayl.) Renauld
  - D. pungens = Dicranoloma robustum (Hook.f. & Wilson) Paris
  - D. setosum = Dicranoloma robustum (Hook.f. & Wilson) Paris
- Dryptodon crispulus = Racomitrium crispulum (Hook.f. & Wilson) Hook.f. & Wilson
- Funaria hygrometrica Hedw.
- Four species of Hookeria
  - H. denticulata Mitt.
  - H. nervosa Hook.f. & Wils.
  - H. pennata = Cyathophorum bulbosum (Hedw.) Müll.Hal.
  - H. pulchella = Distichophyllum pulchellum (Hampe) Mitt.
- Hypnum aciculare = Ptychomnion aciculare (Brid.) Mitt.
- H. acutifolium Hook.f. & Wils.
- H. arbuscula Sw.
- H. bifarium = Hymenodontopsis bifaria (Hook.) N.E.Bell, A.E.Newton & D.Quandt
- H. chlamydophyllum = Acrocladium chlamydophyllum (Hook.f. & Wils.) Müll.Hal. & Broth.
- H. cochlearifolium = Weymouthia cochlearifolia (Schwägr.) Dixon
- H. comosum = Mniodendron comosum var. comosum (Labill.) Lindb. ex Paris
- H. consimile Hook.f. & Wils.
- H. cupressiforme L.
- H. elongatum = Breutelia elongata (Hook.f. & Wilson) Mitt.
- H. filicinum L.
- H. fluitans L. = Warnstorfia fluitans (Hedw.) Loeske
- H. gracile Hook.f. & Wils.
- H. hispidum = Echinodium hispidum (Hook.f. & Wils.) Reichardt
- H. leptorhynchum = Rhaphidorrhynchium amoenum var. amoenum (Hedw.) M.Fleisch.
- H. rutabulum L. = Brachythecium rutabulum (Hedw.) Schimp.
- H. scabrifolium = Philonotis scabrifolia (Hook.f. & Wilson) Braithw.
- H. serpens L. = Amblystegium serpens (Hedw.) Bruch & Schimp.
- H. spiniforme L. = Pyrrhobryum spiniforme (Hedw.) Mitt.
- H. terraenovae var. australe = Isopterygium limatum (Hook.f. & Wilson) Broth.
- Leptostomum gracile = Leptostomum inclinans R.Br.
- Three species misprinted as Leskia (= Leskea):
  - Leskia concinna = Lopidium concinnum (Hook.) Wilson
  - L. novaehollandiae Schwaeg.
  - L. tamariscina = Hypnum setigerum P. Beauv.
- Lophiodon strictus = Ditrichum strictum (Hook.f. & Wils.) Hampe
- M. acutifolium Brid.
- Macromitrium longirostre Schwaeg. = M. acutifolium
- Racomitrium lanuginosum Brid.
- Two species of Orthotrichum:
  - O. angustifolium Hook.f. & Wils.
  - O. crassifolium Hook.f. & Wils.
- Polytrichum magellanicum = Polytrichadelphus magellanicus (Hedw.) Mitt.
- Schlotheimia quadrifida Brid. = S. angulosa (P. Beauv.) Dixon.
- Sphagnum compactum Brid.
- Two species of Splachnum now assigned to Tayloria:
  - S. purpurascens = T. purpurascens (Hook.f. & Wils.) Broth.
  - S. octoblepharum = T. octoblepharum (Hook.) Mitt.
- Sprucea perichaetialis = Holomitrium perichaetiale (Hook.) Brid.
- Two species of Weissia:
  - W. crispula = Dicranoweisia crispula (Hedwig) Milde
  - W. contecta = Dicranoweisia contecta (Hook.f. & Wilson) Paris.

=== Liverworts ===
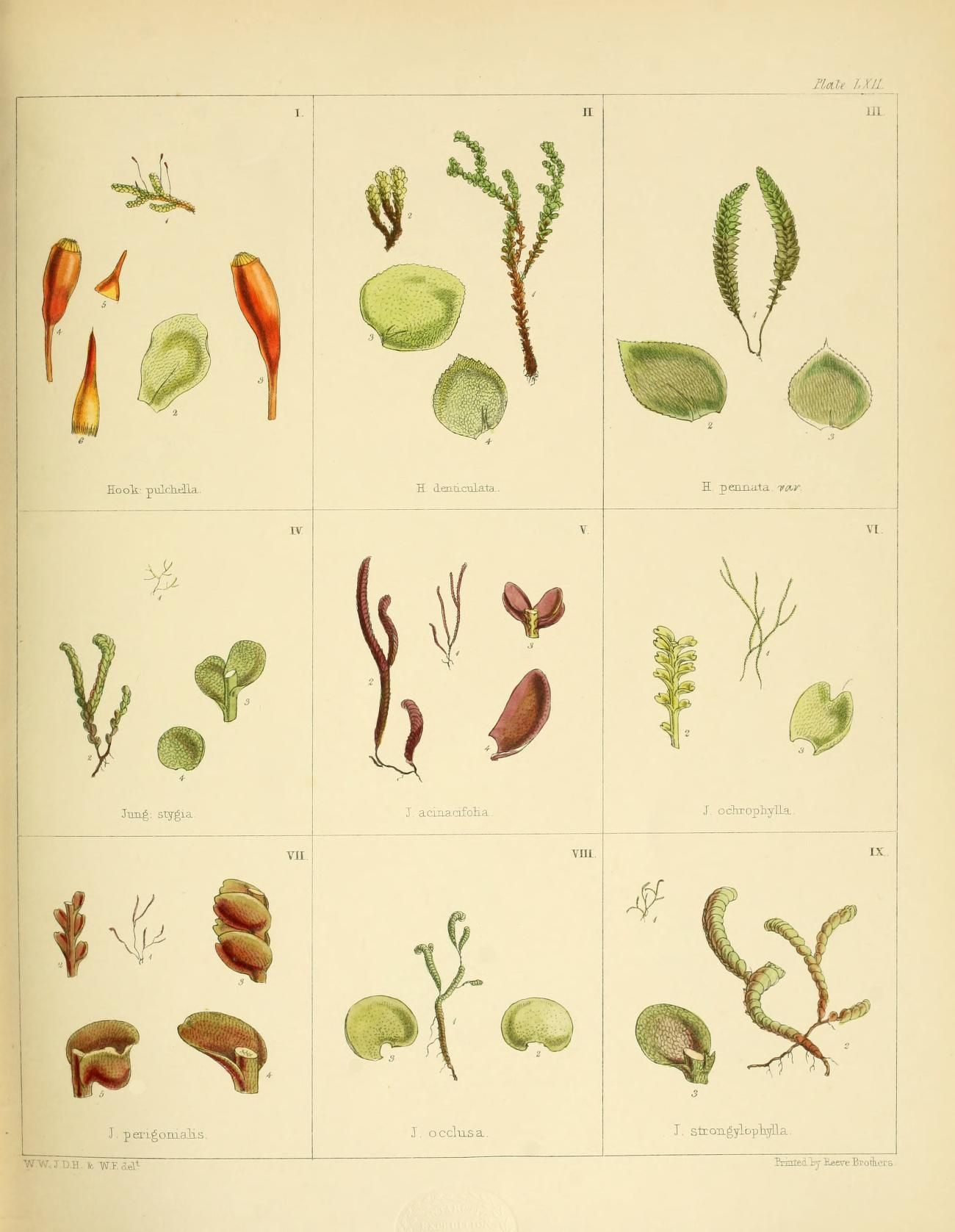
Plate LXII, left to right, than top to bottom: I Hookeria pulchella, II H. denticulata, III H. pennata, IV: Jungermannia stygia, V J. acinacifolia, VI: J. ochrophylla, VII J. perigonialis, VIII J. occlusa, IX J. strongylophylla

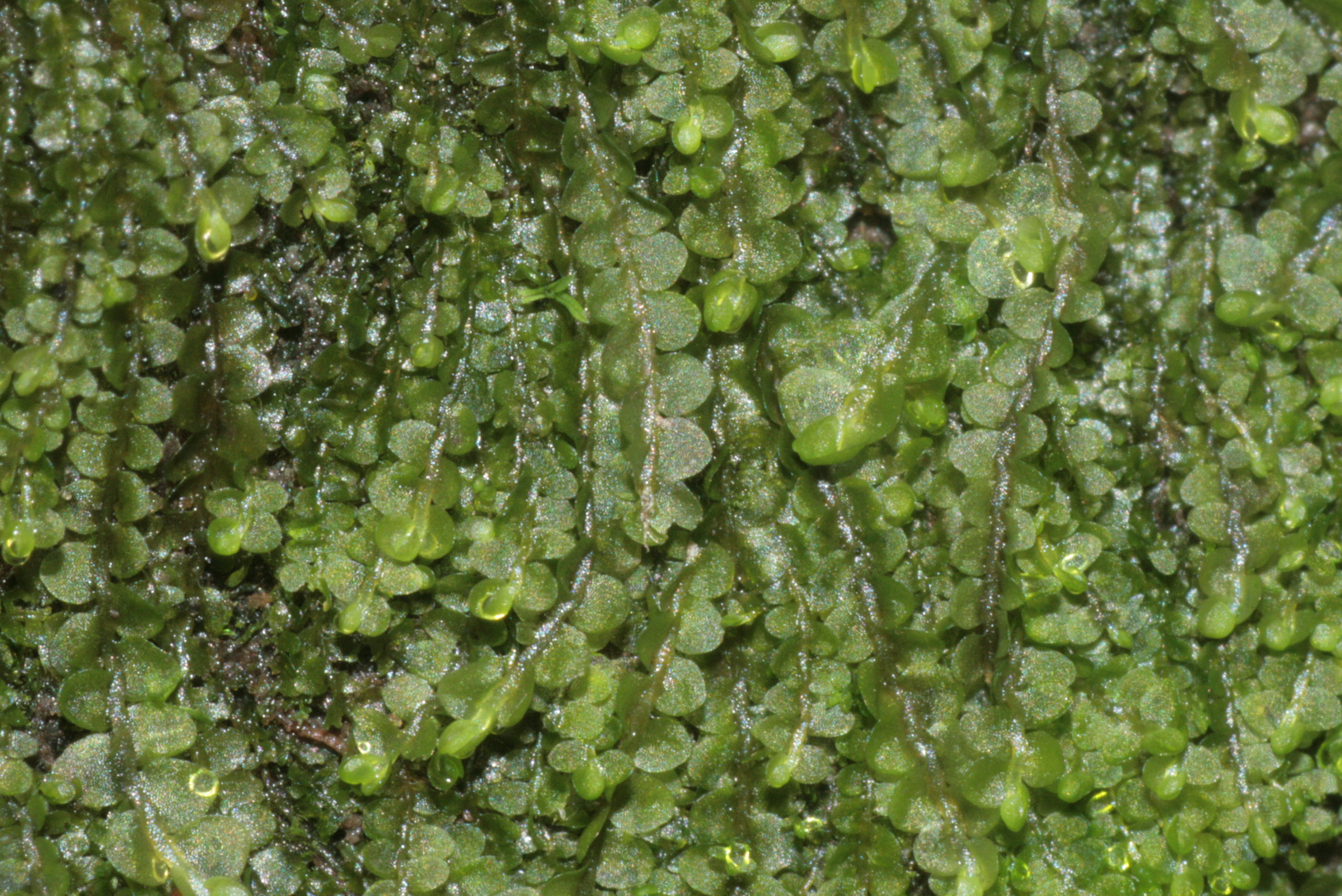
Jungermannia atrovirens

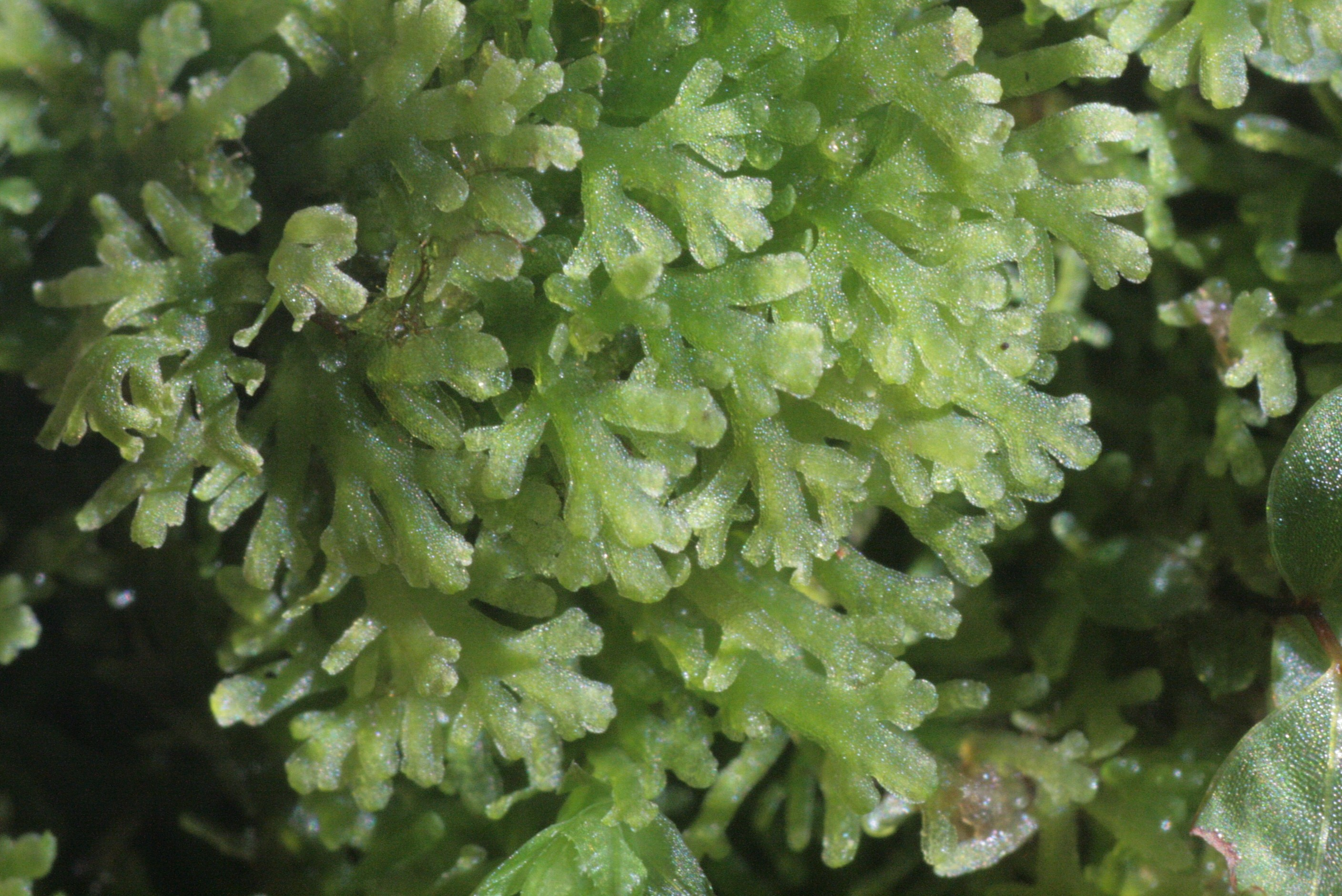
J. multifida, now assigned to Riccardia

The Flora Antarctica contains a very large number of liverwort species from the Auckland and Campbell Islands, at that time almost all assigned to the genus Jungermannia. Of the 82 species mentioned in the Flora Antarctica, 79 have since been reassigned to other genera in the Jungermanniales. Hooker credits the scientists in the Cryptogamic Botany Department, especially Thomas Taylor, for their expertise and cooperation in preparing the sections on mosses, liverworts and lichens. The species published under their common authorship are generally indicated by Hook.f & Taylor. This has been omitted in this section for brevity. Authors are also not indicated with type species that have later been transferred to another genus while retaining the original species epithet, because this authority appears in the new combination between brackets. All other author (combinations) were indicated though.

- Anthoceros punctatus L.
- Hygropila dilatata Hook.f. & Taylor
- Jungermannia acinacifolia = Syzygiella acinacifolia (Hook.f. & Taylor) K.Feldberg, Váňa, Hentschel & Heinrichs
- J. albovirens = Cheilolejeunea albovirens (Hook. f. & Taylor) E.A. Hodgs.
- J. albula = Lepidozia ulothrix (Schwagr.) Lindenb.
- J. allodonta = Heteroscyphus allodontus (Hook.f. &. Taylor) J. J. Engel &. R. M. Schust.
- J. allophylla = Lepidolaena reticulata (Hook.f. & Taylor) Trevis.
- J. argentea = Zoopsis argentea (Hook. f. & Taylor) Spruce
- J. aterrima = Frullania aterrima (Hook.f. &. Taylor) Hook.f. & Taylor ex Gottsche, Lindenb. & Nees
- J. atrovirens, J. australis = Leptoscyphus australis (Gottsche. Lindenb. & Nees) Schust.
- J. balfouriana Taylor = Gottschea ciliistipula Colenso
- J. billardieri = Heteroscyphus billardieri (Schwägr.) Schiffn.
- J. bispinosa = Chiloscyphus bispinosus (Hook.f. & Taylor) J.J.Engel & R.M.Schust.
- J. circinalis = Plagiochila circinalis (Lehm. &. Lindenb.) Lehm. &. Lindenb. ex Lindenb.
- J. clavigera = Lepidolaena clavigera (Hook.) Dumort. ex Trevis.
- J. coalita = Heteroscyphus coalitus (Hook.) Schiffn.
- J. cognata Hook.f. & Taylor = Dinckleria pleurata (Hook.f. & Taylor) Trevis.
- J. colorata Lehm. = Jamesoniella colorata
- J. complanata = Radula complanata (L.) Dumort.
- J. congesta = Lethocolea congesta (Lehm.) S.W. Arnell
- J. cymbalifera = Heteroscyphus cymbalifer (Hook.f. & Taylor) J.J.Engel & R.M.Schust.
- J. diplophylla = Balantiopsis diplophylla (Hook.f. & Taylor) Mitt.
- J. dispar = Telaranea dispar (Mont. ex Hook.f. & Taylor) E.A.Hodgs.
- J. elegantula = Porella elegantula (Mont.) E.A.Hodgs.
- J. fasciculata (Lindenb.) Hook.f. & Taylor
- J. fissistipa = Heteroscyphus fissistipus (Hook.f. & Taylor) Schiffn.
- J. flabellata = Hymenophyton flabellatum (Labill.) Dumort. ex Trevis.
- J. furcata = Metzgeria furcata (L.) Dumort.
- J. fuscella = Plagiochila fuscella (Hook.f. & Taylor) Gottsche et al.
- J. grisea = Chiloscyphus novaezeelandiae var. novae-zeelandiae (Lehm. & Lindenb.) J.J.Engel & R.M.Schust.
- J. hemicardia = Plagiochila circinalis (Lehm. &. Lindenb.) Lehm. &. Lindenb. ex Lindenb.
- J. hippurioides = Kurzia hippurioides (Hook.f. & Taylor) Grolle
- J. hirsuta Nees = Lepicolea ochroleuca (L.f. ex Spreng.) Spruce
- J. implexicaulis = Cheilolejeunea implexicaulis (Taylor) R.M.Schuster
- J. involuta = Bazzania involuta (Mont.) Trevis.
- J. lehmannia Lind.
- J. intortifolia = Isotachis intortifolia (Hook.f. & Taylor) Gottsche
- J. laevifolia = Lepidozia laevifolia (Hook.f. & Taylor) Gottsche, Lindenb. & Nees
- J. latitans = Harpalejeunea latitans (Hook.f. & Taylor) Grolle
- J. lenta = Chiloscyphus lentus (Hook.f. & Taylor) J.J.Engel & R.M.Schust.
- J. leucophylla = Cryptolophocolea leucophylla (Hook.f. & Taylor) L.Söderstr.
- J. magellanica = Lepidolaena magellanica (Lam.) A.Evans
- J. mimosa = Cheilolejeunea mimosa (Hook.f. & Taylor) R.M.Schust.
- J. minuta Crantz = Eremonotus minutus (Schreb.) R.M.Schust.
- J. mollisima = Trichocolea mollissima (Hook.f. & Taylor) Gottsche
- J. multicuspidata = Protolophozia multicuspidata (Hook.f. & Taylor) Váňa & L.Söderstr.
- J. multifida Hook. = Riccardia multifida ssp. multifida (L.) Gray
- J. multipenna = Chiloscyphus multipennus (Hook.f. & Taylor) J.J.Engel & R.M.Schust.
- J. notophylla = Clasmatocolea notophylla (Hook.f. & Taylor) Grolle
- J. novaehollandiae Nees = Bazzania adnexa (Lehm. &. Lindenb.) Trevis.
- J. nutans = Lembidium nutans (Hook.f. & Taylor) Mitt. ex A.Evans
- J. occlusa = Calyptrocolea occlusa (Hook.f. & Taylor) R.M. Schust.
- J. ochrophylla = Acrobolbus ochrophyllus (Hook.f. & Taylor) R.M.Schust.
- J. pachyphylla = Pachyschistochila pachyphylla (Lehm.) R.M.Schust. & J.J.Engel
- J. patentissima = Telaranea patentissima (Hook.f. & Taylor) E.A.Hodgs.
- J. perigonialis = Andrewsianthus perigonialis (Hook.f. & Taylor) R.M.Schust.
- J. perpusilla = Chiloscyphus perpusillus (Hook.f. & Taylor) J.J.Engel
- J. phyllanthus = Podomitrium phyllanthus (Hook.) Mitt.
- J. physoloba (Mont.) Hook.f. = Radula physoloba Mont.
- J. pinnatifida Hook. = Riccardia chamedryfolia (With.) Grolle
- J. planiuscula = Heteroscyphus planiusculus (Hook.f. & Taylor) J.J.Engel
- J. pleurota = Dinckleria pleurata (Hook.f. & Taylor) Trevis.
- J. plicatiloba = Diplasiolejeunea plicatiloba (Hook.f. & Taylor) Grolle
- J. polyacantha = Eotrichocolea polyacantha (Hook.f. & Taylor) R.M.Schust.
- J. primordialis = Lejeunea primordialis (Hook.f. & Taylor) Taylor ex Gottsche, Lindenb. & Nees
- J. ptychantha = Frullania ptychantha (Mont.) Hook.f. & Taylor
- J. reticulata = Lepidolaena reticulata (Hook.f. & Taylor) Trevis.
- J. rostrata = Frullania rostrata (Hook.f. & Taylor) Hook.f. & Taylor ex Gottsche, Lindenb. & Nees
- J. saccata = Tylimanthus saccatus (Hook.) Mitt.
- J. scandens = Frullania scandens (Mont.) Hook.f. & Taylor
- J. schismoides = Anastrophyllum schismoides (Mont.) Steph.
- J. scolopendra = Leperoma scolopendra (Hook.) Bastow
- J. sinuosa = Heteroscyphus sinuosus (Hook.) Schiffn.
- J. spinifera = Chiloscyphus spiniferus (Hook.f. & Taylor) J.J.Engel & R.M.Schust.
- J. strongylophylla = Clasmatocolea strongylophylla (Hook.f. & Taylor) Grolle
- J. stygia = Herzogobryum teres (Carrington & Pearson) Grolle
- J. tenacifolia = Chiloscyphus tenacifolius (Hook.f. & Taylor) Hentschel & J.Heinrichs
- J. tenax = Kurzia tenax (Grev.) Grolle
- J. tetradactyla = Telaranea tetradactyla (Hook.f. &. Taylor) E.A.Hodgs.
- J. turgescens = Clasmatocolea strongylophylla (Hook.f. & Taylor) Grolle
- J. urvilleana Gottsche, Lind. & Lehm. = Acrobolbus concinnus (Mitt.) Grolle
- J. uvifera = Patarola uvifera (Hook.f. & Taylor) Trevis
- J. vertebralis = Blepharidophyllum vertebrale (Taylor ex Gottsche, Lindenb. &. Nees) Angstr.
- Marchantia polymorpha L. (common liverwort).

=== Green algae ===
- Codium tomentosum Stack (velvet horn)
- Ulva latissima L. = Saccharina latissima (L.) C.E.Lane, C.Mayes, Druehl & G.W.Saunders (sea belt).

=== Red algae ===
- Ballia brunonia = B. callitricha (Agardh) Kütz.
- Callithamnion gracile Hook.f. & Harvey
- C. hirtum = Lophothamnion hirtum (Hook.f. & Harvey) Womersley
- C. micropterum Hook.f. & Harvey = C. cryptopterum Kütz.
- C. pectinatum = Antithamnion pectinatum (Mont.) Brauner
- Ceramium cancellatum = C. planum Kütz.
- C. diaphanum var. aucklandicum Hook.f. & Harvey
- C. rubrum var. secundatum (Lyngb.) Agardh
- C. rubrum var. tenue Agardh
- Chondrus tuberculosus = Iridaea tuberculosa (Hook.f. & Harvey) Leister
- Conferva pacifica = Spongomorpha pacifica (Mont.) Kütz.
- C. verticillata Hook.f. & Harvey = ? illegitimate later homonym of C. verticillata Lightfoot, 1777
- Delesseria crassinerva = Nitophyllum bonnemaisonii var. crassinerva Batters
- Dumontia cornuta Hook.f. & Harvey
- D. filiformis = D. contorta (S.G.Gmelin) Ruprecht
- Gigartina divaricata Hook.f. & Harvey
- Grateloupia aucklandica = Glaphyrosiphon aucklandicus (Mont.) W.A.Nelson, S.Y.Kim & S.M.Boo
- Griffithsia setacea (Huds.) Agardh = Halurus flosculosus (J.Ellis) Maggs & Hommersand
- Halymenia latissima = Iridaea latissima (Hook.f. & Harvey) Grunow
- Iridaea radula = Sarcothalia radula (Esper) Edyvane & Womersley
- Hypnea multicornis (Mont.) Mont.
- Jania hombronii = Corallina hombronii (Mont.) Mont. ex Kütz.
- Laurentia pinnatifida var. angustifolia (Turner) Grev. = Osmundea hybrida (DC) K.W.Nam
- Nitophyllum crispatum = Haraldiophyllum crispatum (Hook.f. & Harvey) S.-M.Lin, Hommersand & W.A.Nelson
- Nitophyllum punctatum (Stackh.) Grev.
- Nothogenia variolosa (Mont.) Mont.
- Phyllophora obtusa = Rhodymenia obtusa (Grev.) Womersley
- Plocamium coccineum = Plocamium cartilagineum (L.) P.S.Dixon
- Polysiphonia botryocarpa = Microcolax botryocarpus (Hook.f. & Harvey) F.Schmitz
- P. ceratoclada = Herposiphonia ceratoclada (Mont.) Reinbold
- P. cladostephus = Brongniartella australis (Agardh) F.Schmitz
- Polysiphonia decipiens Mont.
- P. dumosa Hook.f. & Harvey
- P. lyalli = Echinothamnion lyallii (Hook.f. & Harvey) Kylin ex P.C.Silva
- P. punicea = Heterosiphonia punicea (Mont.) Kylin
- P. rudis Hook.f. & Harvey
- Polyzonia cuneifolia = Euzonia cuneifolia (Mont.) Kylin
- Porphyra capensis Kütz
- Ptilota formosissima = Euptilota formosissima (Mont.) Kütz.
- Rhodymenia dichotoma Hook.f. & Harvey
- R. hombroniana = Callophyllis hombroniana (Mont.) Kütz.
- R. ornata = Callophyllis ornata (Mont.) Kütz.
- Rhodomela glomerata Mont.

=== Brown algae ===
- Adenocystis lessoni (Bory) Hook.f. & Harvey = A. utricularis (Bory) Skottsberg
- Asperococcus echinatus = A. fistulosus (Hudson) Hook.
- Chorda lomentaria = Scytosiphon lomentaria (Lyngb.) Link
- Cordaria flagelliformis (O.F.Müller) Agardh (slimy whip weed)
- Desmarestia viridis Lamour. (stringy acid kelp)
- Dictyosiphon fasciculatus = Scytothamnus fasciculatus (Hook.f. & Harvey) A.D.Cotton
- Durvillaea utilis Bory = Durvillaea antarctica (Chamisso) Hariot
- Laminaria sp. (kelp)
- Macrocystis pyrifera (L.) Agardh (giant bladder kelp)
- Marginaria urvilleana = Marginariella urvilleana (A.Rich.) Tandy
- Sphacelaria funicularis = Halopteris funicularis (Mont.) Sauvageau
- Xyphophora billardieri = X. gladiata (Lab.) Mont. ex Kjellman.

=== Diatoms ===
- Schizonema crispum Mont..

=== Lichens ===
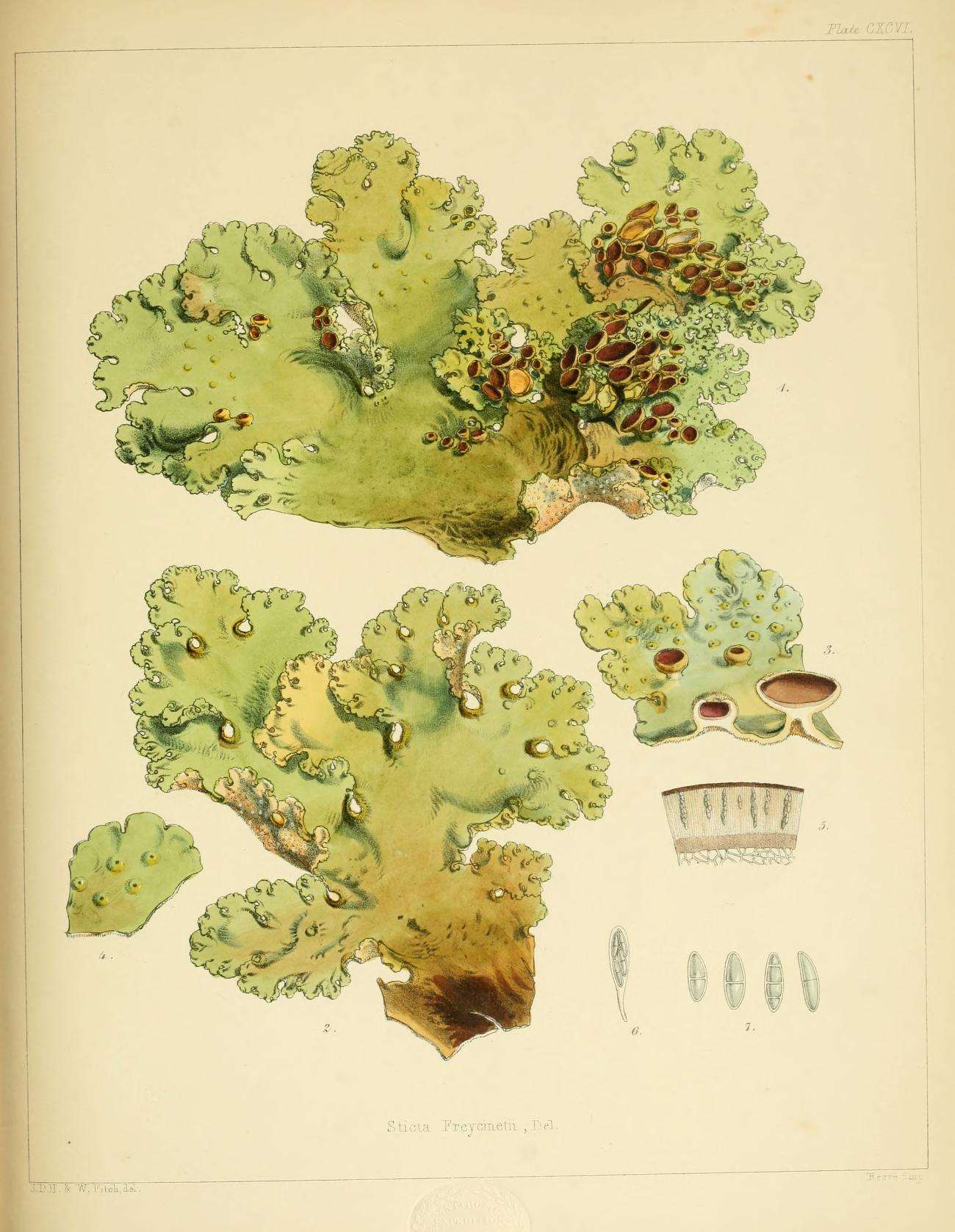
The lichen "Sticta freycinetii" (Pseudocyphellaria glabra)

- Caenomyce aggregata = ?
- C. pyxidata = Cladonia pyxidata (L.) Hoffm.
- C. rangiferina = Cladonia rangiferina (L.) Weber ex F.H. Wigg.
- C. uncialis = Cladonia uncialis (L.) Weber ex F.H. Wigg.
- Lecanora hypnorum = Psoroma hypnorum (Vahl) Gray
- L. parella = Ochrolechia parella (L.) A.Massal.
- L. tartarea = Ochrolechia tartarea (L.) A.Massal.
- L. versicolor = Degeliella versicolor (Müll.Arg.) P.M.Jørg
- Lecidea geomaea = Micarea lignaria var. lignaria (Ach.) Hedl.
- Opegrapha atra Pers.
- Parmelia rubiginosa = Pannaria rubiginosa (Ach.) Bory (rusty bordermoss)
- P. sphinctrina = Pannaria sphinctrina (Mont.) Hue
- Peltidea polydactyla = Peltigera polydactylon (Neck.) Hoffm., Descr. et Adumb.
- Porina granulata = Coccotrema granulatum (Hook.f. & Taylor) R.Sant.
- Ramalina inflata = R. inflata subsp. inflata (Hook.f. & Taylor) Hook.f. & Taylor
- Sphaerophoron australe = Budonophoron australe (Laurer) A.Massal
- S. compressum Ach.
- S. tenerum = Leifidium tenerum (Laurer) Wedin
- Sticta cellulifera Hook.f. & Taylor
- S. foveolata Delise
- S. freycinetii = Pseudocyphellaria glabra (Hook.f. & Taylor) C.W.Dodge
- S. menziesii Hook.f. & Taylor
- Thelotrema lepadinum (Ach.) Ach.
- S. orygmaea Ach.
- S. richardi = S. faveolata var. richardi (Mont.) Linds.
- Usnea barbata var. sulphurea Hook.f. & Taylor
- U. plicata var. hirta = U. hirta (L.) Weber ex F.H. Wigg..

=== Fungi ===
The following fungi are described by Hooker in Flora Antarctica from the Auckland and Campbell Islands.

- Agaricus pyxidatus = Omphalina pyxidata (Bull.) Quél.
- Antennaria scoriadea Berk. (on Dracophyllum longifolium) - new name not found but necessary because Antennaria is taken by an Asteraceae -
- Asteroma dilatatum Berk. (on Panax simplex)
- Cladosporium herbarum (Pers.) Link (on Carex adpressa)
- Aylographum bromi Berk. (on Bromus antarcticus)
- Hendersonia microsticta Berk. (on Bulbinella rossii)
- Dothidea hemisphaerica = Clypeostroma hemisphaericum (Berk.) Theiss. & Syd. (on Veronica odora)
- Dothidea spilomea = Clypeostroma spilomeum (Berk.) Theiss. & Syd. (on Veronica elliptica)
- Hysterium brevi Berk. (on Uncinea hookeri)
- Sclerotium durum Pers. (on capsules of Gentiana concinna)
- Sphaeria depressa Berk. = Physalospora depressa (Berk.) Sacc. (on Luzula crinita)
- S. herbarum = Pleospora herbarum (Pers.) Rabenh. (on Bulbinella rossii)
- S. nebulosa = Phoma nebulosa (Pers.) Berk.
- S. nigrella = Diaporthopsis nigrella (Auersw.) Fabre
- S. phaeosticta = Anthostomella phaeosticta (Berk.) Sacc.
- Uredo antarctica = Puccinia tenuispora McAlpine (on Luzula crinita).
