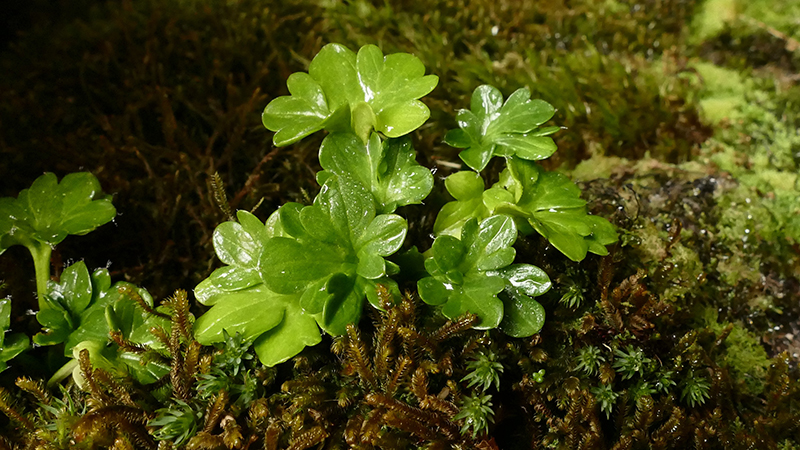

Conservation status
- Nationally Critical (NZ TCS)

Scientific classification
- Kingdom: Plantae
- Clade: Tracheophytes
- Clade: Angiosperms
- Clade: Eudicots
- Order: Ranunculales
- Family: Ranunculaceae
- Genus: Ranunculus
- Species: R. viridis

Binomial name
- Ranunculus viridis H.D.Wilson et Garn.-Jones

= Ranunculus viridis =

Species of buttercup

Ranunculus viridis, the Mount Allen buttercup, is a critically endangered species of alpine Ranunculus (buttercup), endemic to Rakiura / Stewart Island, New Zealand, where it occurs at altitudes of 700 metres (2,300 ft) on Mount Allen in the Tin Range.

== Discovery ==
R. viridis was first described by botanist Hugh Wilson in 1980. The epithet viridis refers to its bright green leaves. Department of Conservation surveys found a small number of plants in the early 2000s and again in March 2017. The latest survey team collected two rosettes, which are being grown in a climate-controlled glasshouse at the Dunedin Botanic Garden.

Rakiura/Stewart Island

== Description ==
The Mount Allen buttercup is a short perennial herb with leaves forming small clumps or patches. It has a stout rhizome with numerous fleshy roots. The leaves are bright green, thick and glossy (20-40mm in diameter). The flower stem is short (15-30mm tall) and barely rises above the leaves. It is covered with fine cobwebby hairs and grooved on its upper surface. A single bright yellow flower forms on each stem and is 25-30mm in diameter. The lower third of the petals are green. The seed head is light green (12 mm in diameter) with many small brown achenes. R. viridis flowers between December and March and fruits between December and May.

== Habitat and ecology ==
New Zealand has more than 40 species of wild buttercups. Thirty-four of these are native and they usually grow in mountain regions and on some predator-free offshore islands. The Mount Allen buttercup is one of three species endemic to Rakiura/Stewart Island. It is found only in the remote Tin Range on the slopes of Mount Allen. It survives in the shady damp crevices and ledges of rocky outcrops high on the mountainside at altitudes of 700 m (2,300 ft). It is most closely related to R. pinguis, which is found on the Auckland and Campbell Islands, and the yellow mountain buttercup (R. sericophyllus) from the South Island.

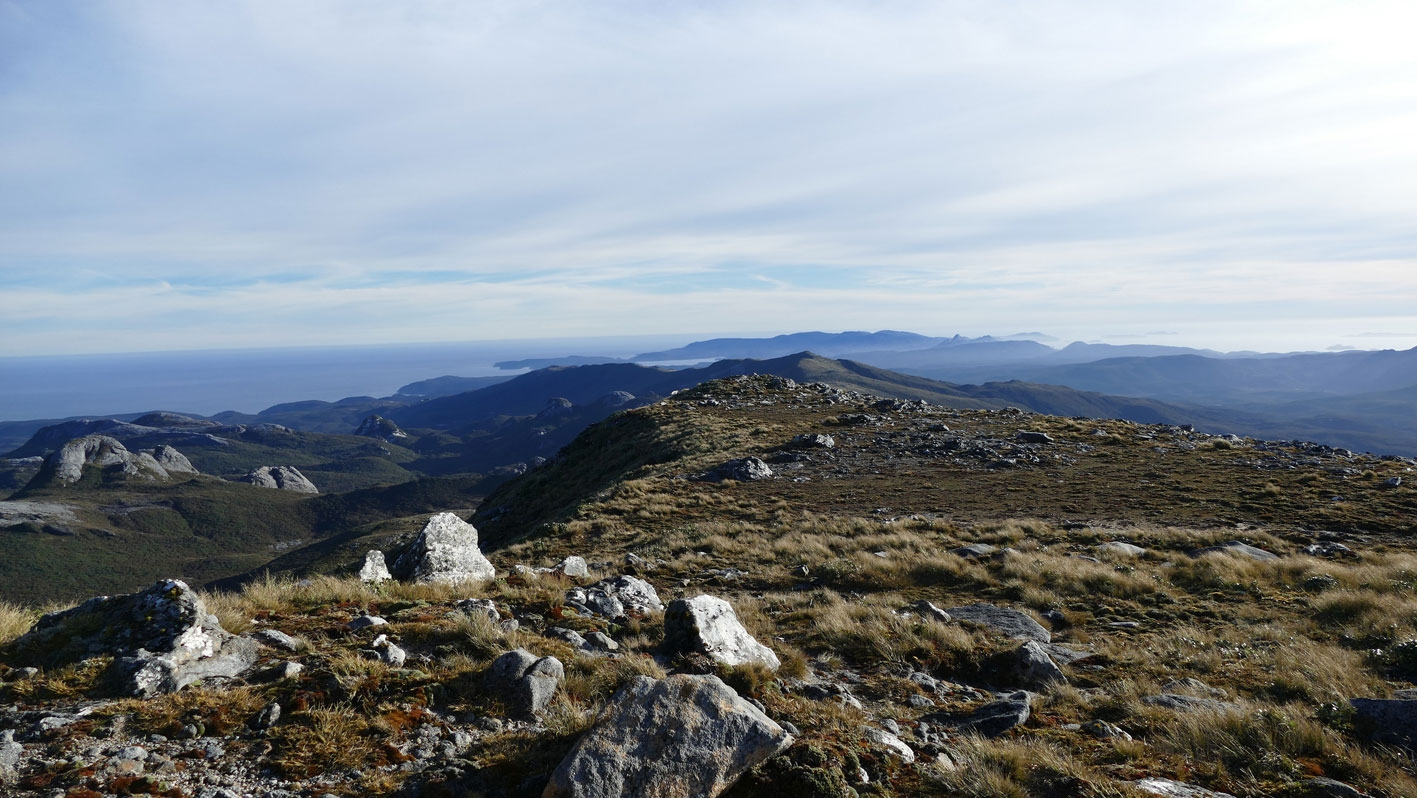
View from Mount Allen
