= Mount Allen (Stewart Island) =

Mountain on Stewart Island, New Zealand

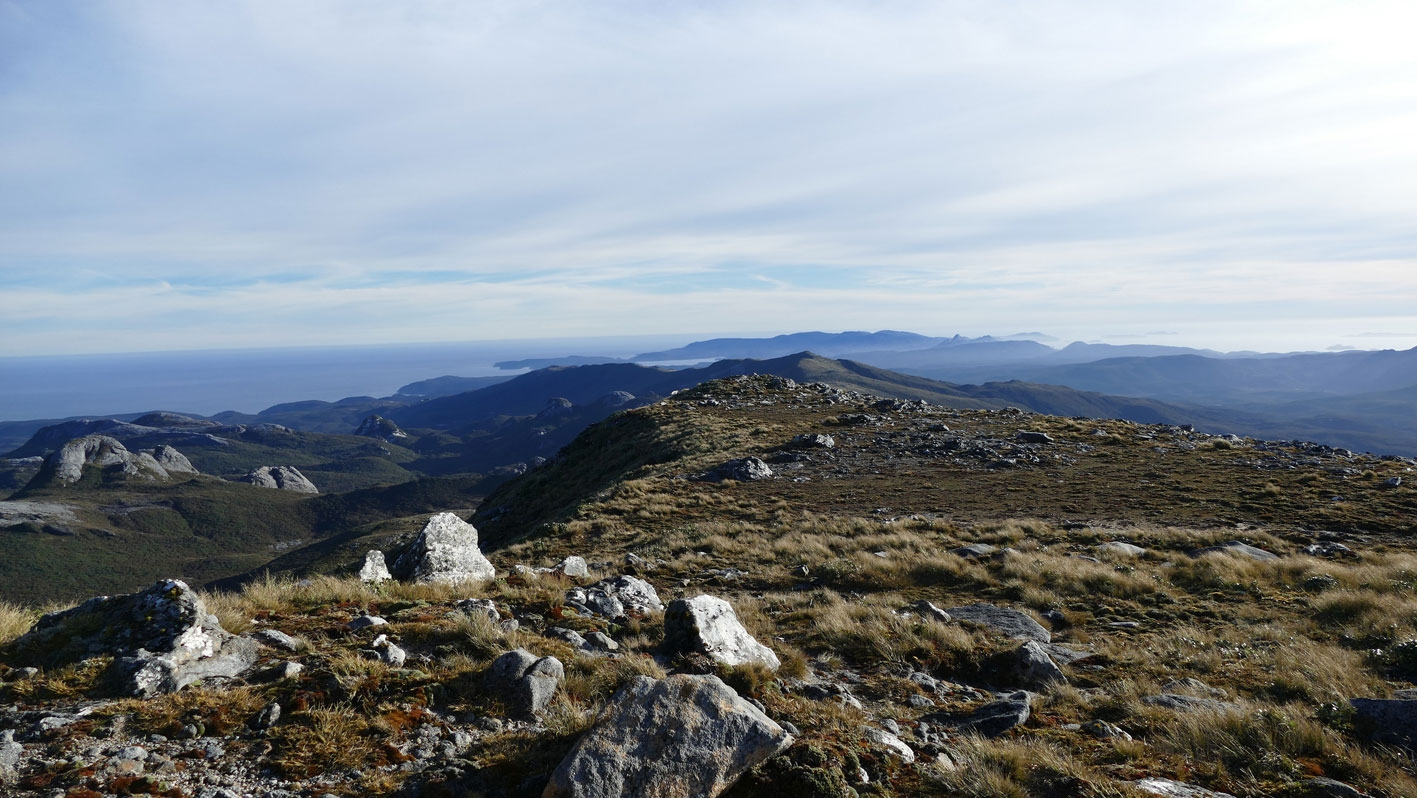

Highest point
- Elevation: 750 m (2,460 ft)
- Coordinates: 47°05′09″S 167°47′56″E

Geography
- Location within New Zealand
- Location: Stewart Island / Rakiura, New Zealand

Mount Allen is the second-highest peak on Stewart Island in southern New Zealand. Located in the southwest of the island, it lies 10 kilometres (6.2 mi) from the coast at Port Pegasus. Mount Allen rises to a height of 750 metres (2,460 ft) and is the highest point in a short range of hills known as Tin Range. It is part of the Rakiura National Park.
