= Ranunculus subscaposus =

- Ranunculus subscaposus with fruits on Auckland Island

Scientific classification
- Kingdom: Plantae
- Clade: Tracheophytes
- Clade: Angiosperms
- Clade: Eudicots
- Order: Ranunculales
- Family: Ranunculaceae
- Genus: Ranunculus
- Species: R. subscaposus

Binomial name
- Ranunculus subscaposus Hook.f.

Species of flowering plant

Ranunculus subscaposus is a species of flowering plant in the family Ranunculaceae, endemic to the subantarctic Auckland Islands and Campbell Island in New Zealand.
