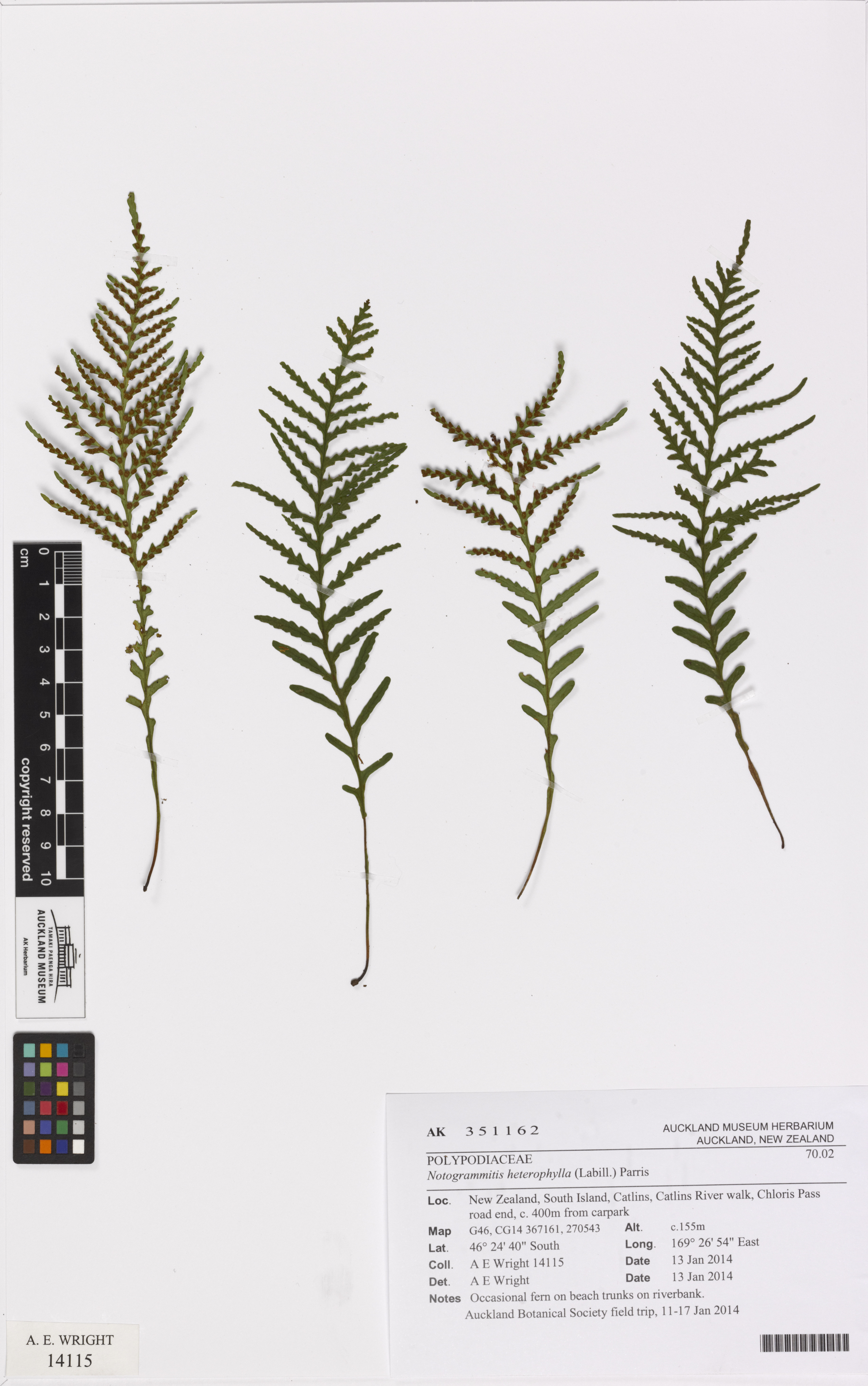

Scientific classification
- Kingdom: Plantae
- Clade: Embryophytes
- Clade: Tracheophytes
- Division: Polypodiophyta
- Class: Polypodiopsida
- Order: Polypodiales
- Suborder: Polypodiineae
- Family: Polypodiaceae
- Genus: Notogrammitis
- Species: N. heterophylla

Binomial name
- Notogrammitis heterophylla (Labill.) Parris

Synonyms
- Ctenopteris heterophylla Labill.

= Notogrammitis heterophylla =

Species of fern

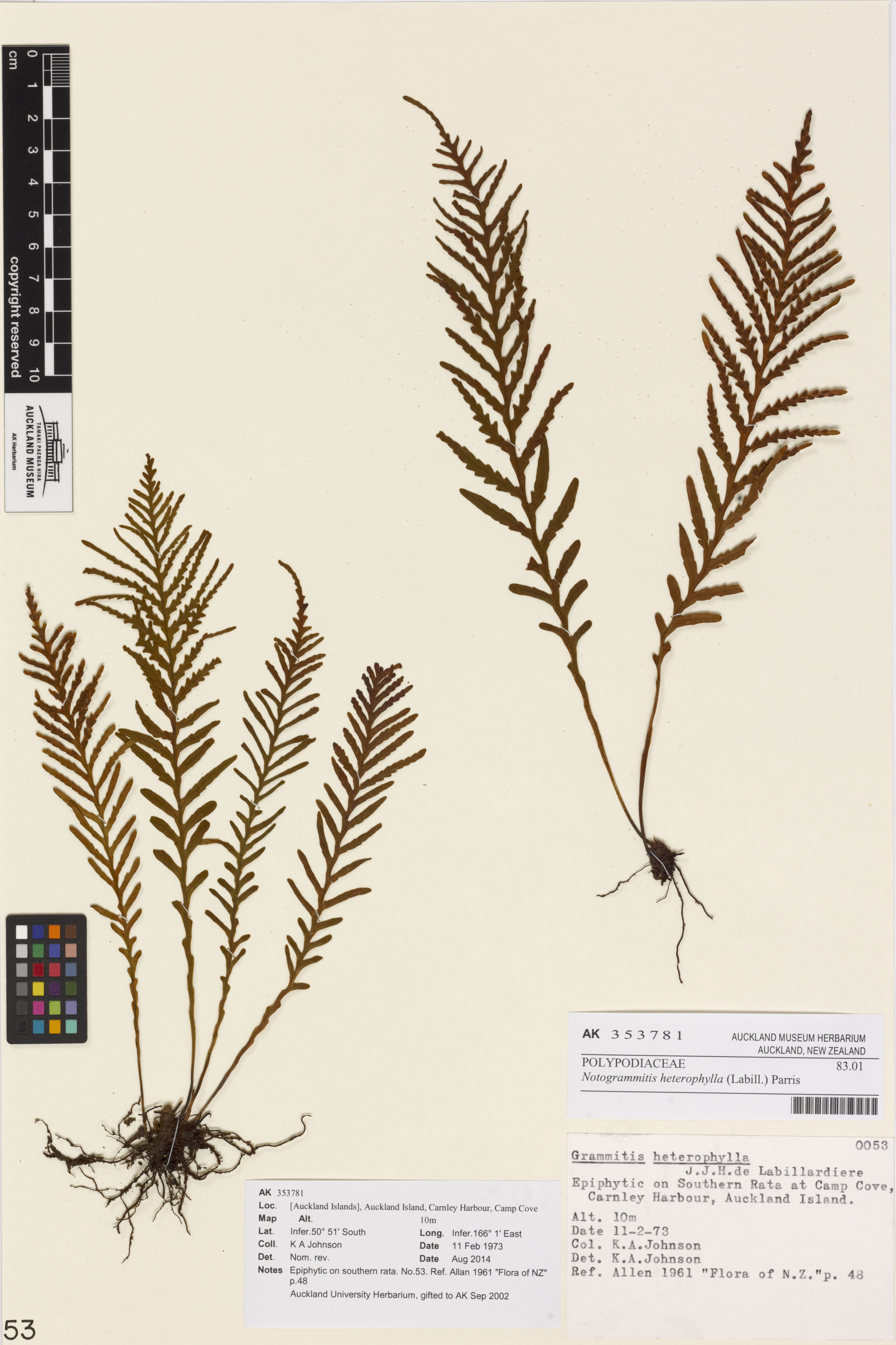
Notogrammitis heterophylla

Notogrammitis heterophylla is a species of fern within the family Polypodiaceae. The species is found in New Zealand (where it is also known by its Māori name of taupeka), Tasmania and Victoria, Australia. This plant is epiphytic. In New Zealand, N. heterophylla occurs in association with other epiphytes such as Asplenium polyodon and Trichomanes reniforme.

== Identification ==
Notogrammitis heterophylla is a type of comb fern and forms tufted patches. It is a dark to light green colour on both surfaces. The fronds are produced in two rows and the leaf margins are entire or they have primary and secondary lobules. The pinnae have approximately 7–42 pairs and the longest pinnae are from 3–60mm long and 1.5–15mm in width.

== Geographic Distribution and Habitat ==
=== Natural Global Range ===
The species can be found in New Zealand and in Tasmania and Victoria, Australia.

=== New Zealand Range ===
In New Zealand, the species is found in the North Island, including Northland, Auckland, Volcanic Plateau, Gisborne, Taranaki, southern North Island, in the South Island, including western Nelson, Sounds-Nelson, Marlborough, Westland, Canterbury, Otago, Southland, Fiordland, and in the costal islands including Chatham Islands, Solander Island, Stewart Island and Auckland Islands.

=== Habitat Preferences ===
The preferred habitat for this species is coastal to subalpine environments. It is usually an epiphytic species; however, it can also be found on cliff faces, in the forest on boulders, and on rocks which are sheltered within talus and scree. The species can be found in forests of beech, kauri, podocarp and broadleaf trees, as well as in coastal and subalpine shrub, and underneath mānuka and kānuka trees.

== Lifecycle and Phenology ==
The life cycle of the species begins when the minute spores are dispersed by the wind. Once spores are dispersed they will then grow with an erect rhizome from areas such as clay banks, or they will grow at the base of trees, on logs that have fallen, as well as rock outcrops, the ground, wet cliff faces and on track and stream banks.

== Diet and Foraging ==
The species prefers to be in conditions that are in lowland, montane and subalpine areas, and so the soils that they like are the ones found in these types of areas, which is a variety. It is mostly an epiphyte, which means that it will grow on the surface of another plant species. Epiphytes derive their moisture and nutrients from the environment that surrounds them, so the nutrients they receive vary depending on whereabouts they are growing.
