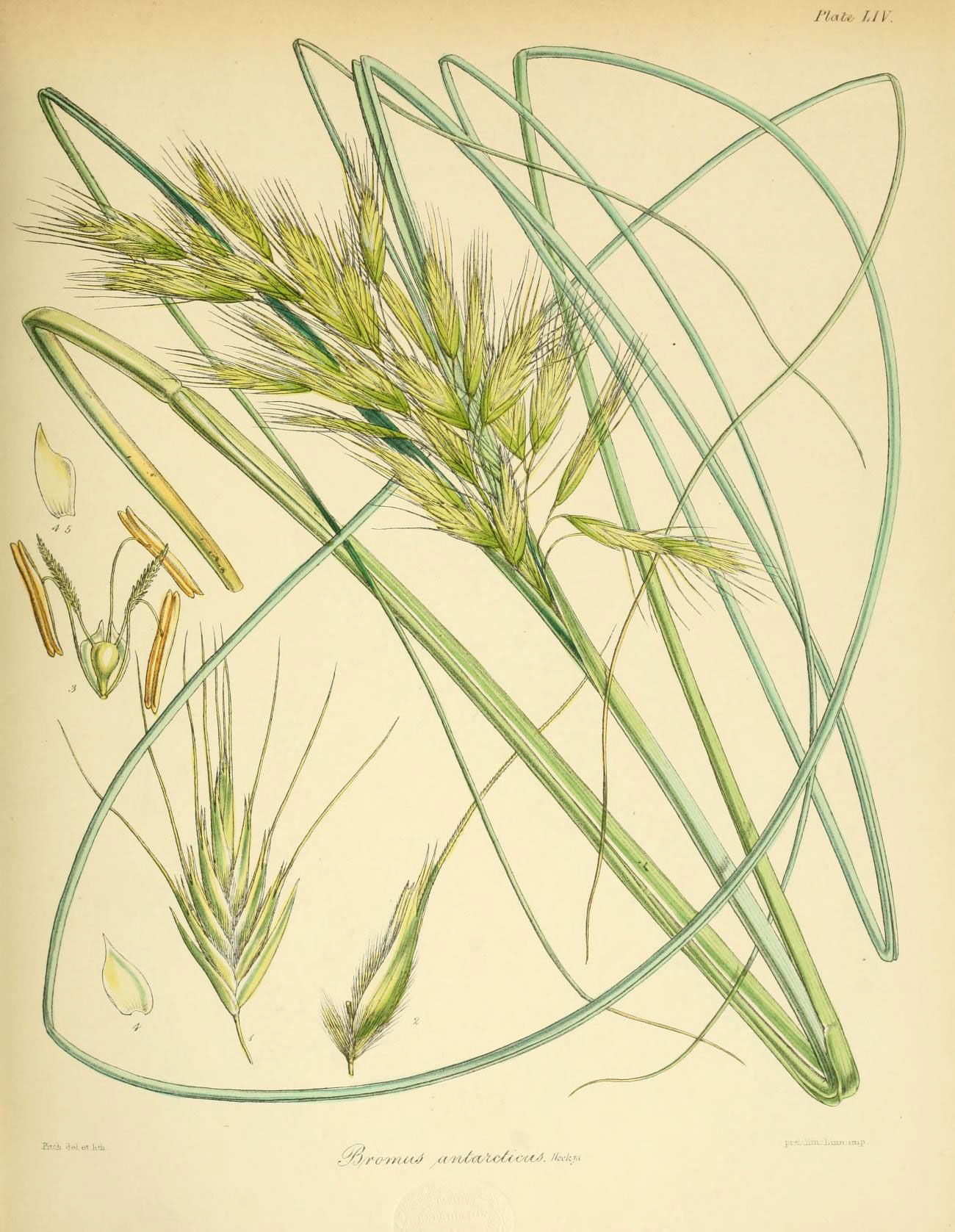
- Plate LIV (artist Fitch)

Conservation status
- Naturally Uncommon (NZ TCS)

Scientific classification
- Kingdom: Plantae
- Clade: Tracheophytes
- Clade: Angiosperms
- Clade: Monocots
- Clade: Commelinids
- Order: Poales
- Family: Poaceae
- Genus: Chionochloa
- Species: C. antarctica

Binomial name
- Chionochloa antarctica (Hook.f.) Zotov

Synonyms
- Bromus antarcticus Hook.f. Danthonia antarctica (Hook.f.) Hook.f. Danthonia flavescens var. hookeri Zotov

= Chionochloa antarctica =

Species of grass

Chionochloa antarctica (common name - snow tussock) is a species of grass, endemic to the Auckland and Campbell Islands.

== Description ==
It flowers from October to December and fruits from November to March.

== Conservation status ==
In both 2009 and 2012 it was deemed to be "At Risk - Naturally Uncommon" under the New Zealand Threat Classification System, and this New Zealand classification was reaffirmed in 2018 (due to its restricted range).
