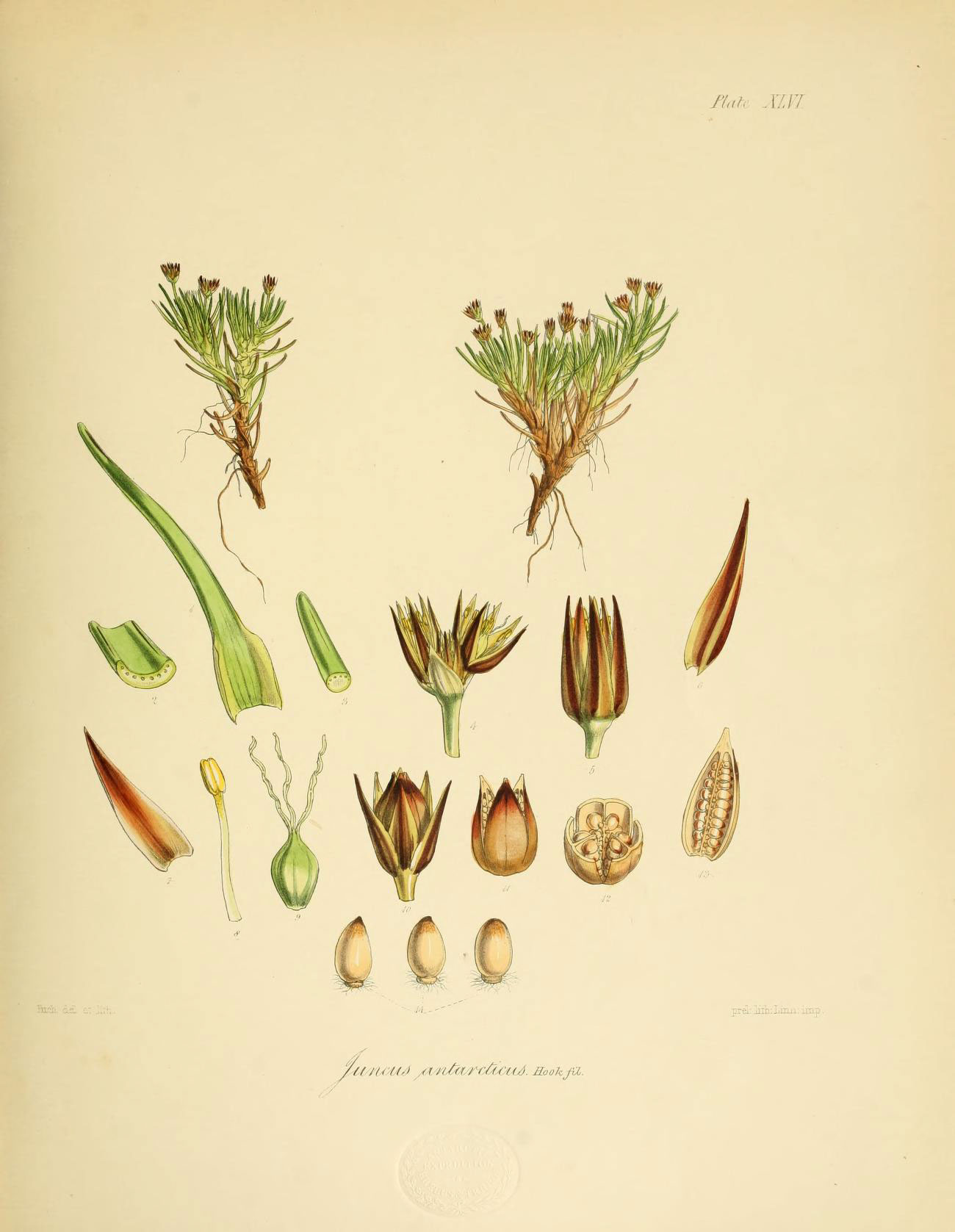
- Plate XLVI (artist Fitch)

Scientific classification
- Kingdom: Plantae
- Clade: Tracheophytes
- Clade: Angiosperms
- Clade: Monocots
- Clade: Commelinids
- Order: Poales
- Family: Juncaceae
- Genus: Juncus
- Species: J. antarcticus

Binomial name
- Juncus antarcticus Hook.f.

Synonyms
- Juncus brevifolius Kirk; Juncus pauciflorus Kirk

= Juncus antarcticus =

Species of rush

Juncus antarcticus, also known as dwarf rush, is a flowering plant species in the rush family Juncaceae, native to New Zealand and Australia.

== Description ==
It is a dwarf perennial that forms cushions and has well-developed rhizomes and stolons. The culms are erect, smooth, and 0.5–5 cm high, both slightly shorter and slightly exceeding the leaves in length. The leaves are borne on the more or less elongated aerial portion of a stem, with the older leaves persisting and turning yellow-brown. The inflorescence is a 1–5-flowered cluster, which expands to about 3–7 mm in diameter when in fruit. There are three stamens, sometimes six. The upper part of the ovoid capsules is reddish-brown, and they are 2–3 mm long.

== Distribution ==
In Australia, it is found in New South Wales, Tasmania, and Victoria. In Victoria, it is found late-lying snowpatches and at the edges of bogs and creeks on the Bogong High Plains.

In New Zealand, it is found in both the North and South Islands, and Stewart, Chatham, Auckland and Campbell Islands.

== Habitat ==
It is found in wetlands, bogs and mires.

In the northern part of its range (in New Zealand and Australia) it is alpine to subalpine, but in the subantarctic islands and around Otago it is also found at sea level.

== Conservation status ==
In both 2009 and 2012 it was deemed to be "Not Threatened" under the New Zealand Threat Classification System, and this New Zealand classification was reaffirmed in 2018, with the further comment that it is secure overseas.

In Victoria it is listed as vulnerable under the Flora and Fauna Guarantee Act 1988.
