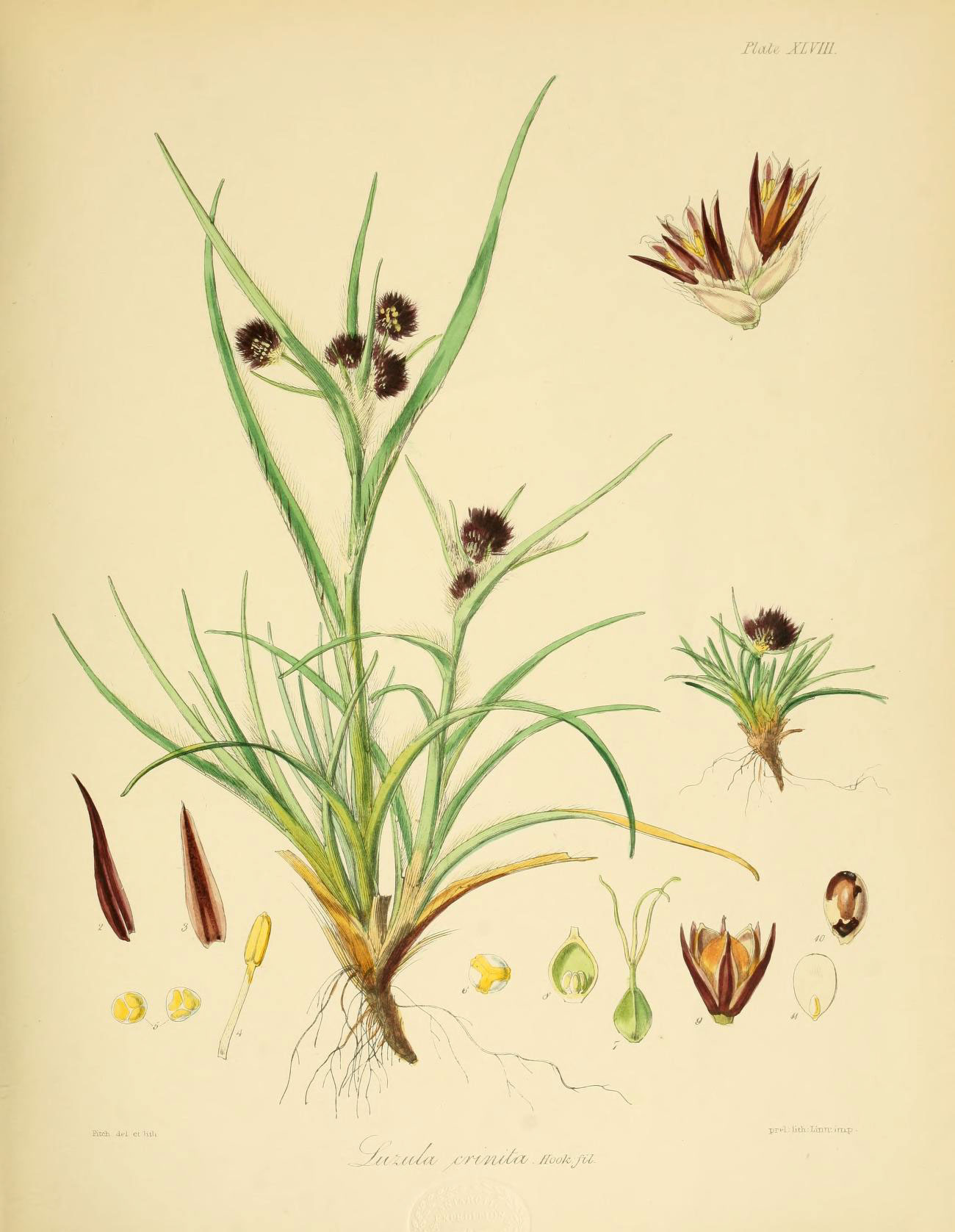
- Plate XLVIII

Scientific classification
- Kingdom: Plantae
- Clade: Tracheophytes
- Clade: Angiosperms
- Clade: Monocots
- Clade: Commelinids
- Order: Poales
- Family: Juncaceae
- Genus: Luzula
- Species: L. crinita

Binomial name
- Luzula crinita Hook f.

Synonyms
- Luzula campestris var. crinita (Hook.f.) Buchenau

= Luzula crinita =

Species of flowering plant in the rush family

Luzula crinita is a species of flowering plant in the rush family that is native to the subantarctic islands of New Zealand and Australia. The specific epithet comes from the Latin crinitus (hairy tufted), with reference to the leaves.

== Description ==
Luzula crinita is a perennial herb that grows in stiff, dark green clumps 40–450 mm (1.6–17.7 in) in height. The leaves have incurved edges and long marginal hairs. The inflorescence is usually a single, rounded, brownish-black head with densely crowded florets and hairy bracteole margin. The flowers are 2–2.5 mm long and have six stamens. The tepals and capsule are dark brown.

== Distribution and habitat ==
The plant is found on New Zealand's Antipodes, Auckland, and Campbell Islands, as well as Australia's Macquarie Island. It grows in Agrostis grassland, fellfield, and along the margins of marshes, from sea level to an altitude of 370 m (1,210 ft). It flowers from October to January.
