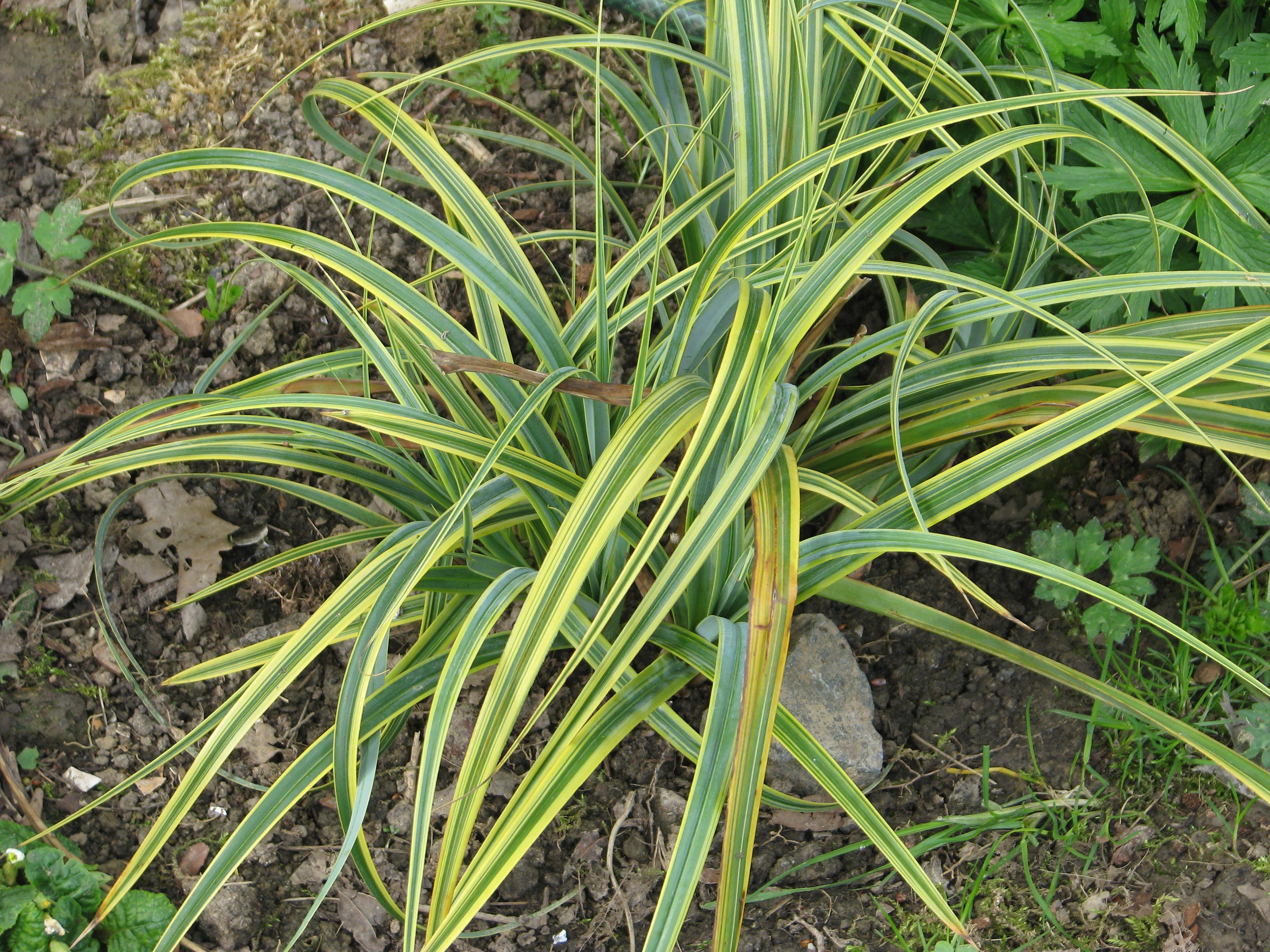
- 'Rekohu Sunrise' cultivar
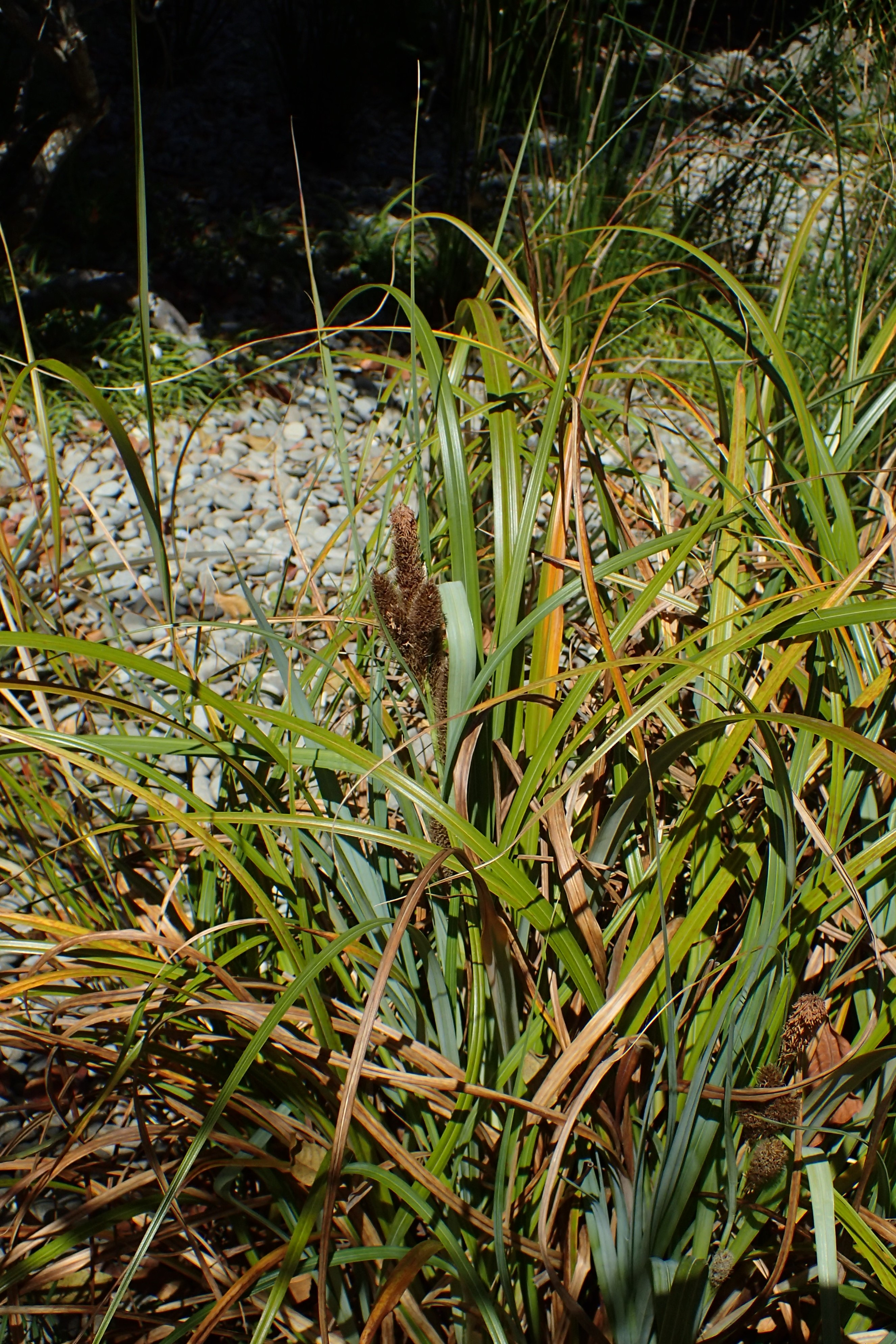
- At Dunedin Botanic Garden

Scientific classification
- Kingdom: Plantae
- Clade: Tracheophytes
- Clade: Angiosperms
- Clade: Monocots
- Clade: Commelinids
- Order: Poales
- Family: Cyperaceae
- Genus: Carex
- Species: C. trifida

Binomial name
- Carex trifida Cav.

Synonyms
- Carex incrassata Sol. ex Boott; Carex rekohu Petrie

= Carex trifida =

Species of flowering plant

Carex trifida, the mutton-bird sedge, is a species of flowering plant in the family Cyperaceae, native to Macquarie Island of Australia, the South Island, the Antipodes Islands, and the Chatham Islands of New Zealand, southern Chile, and the Falkland Islands. There are a number of cultivars, including 'Rekohu Sunrise', 'Glauca', and 'Chatham Blue'.
