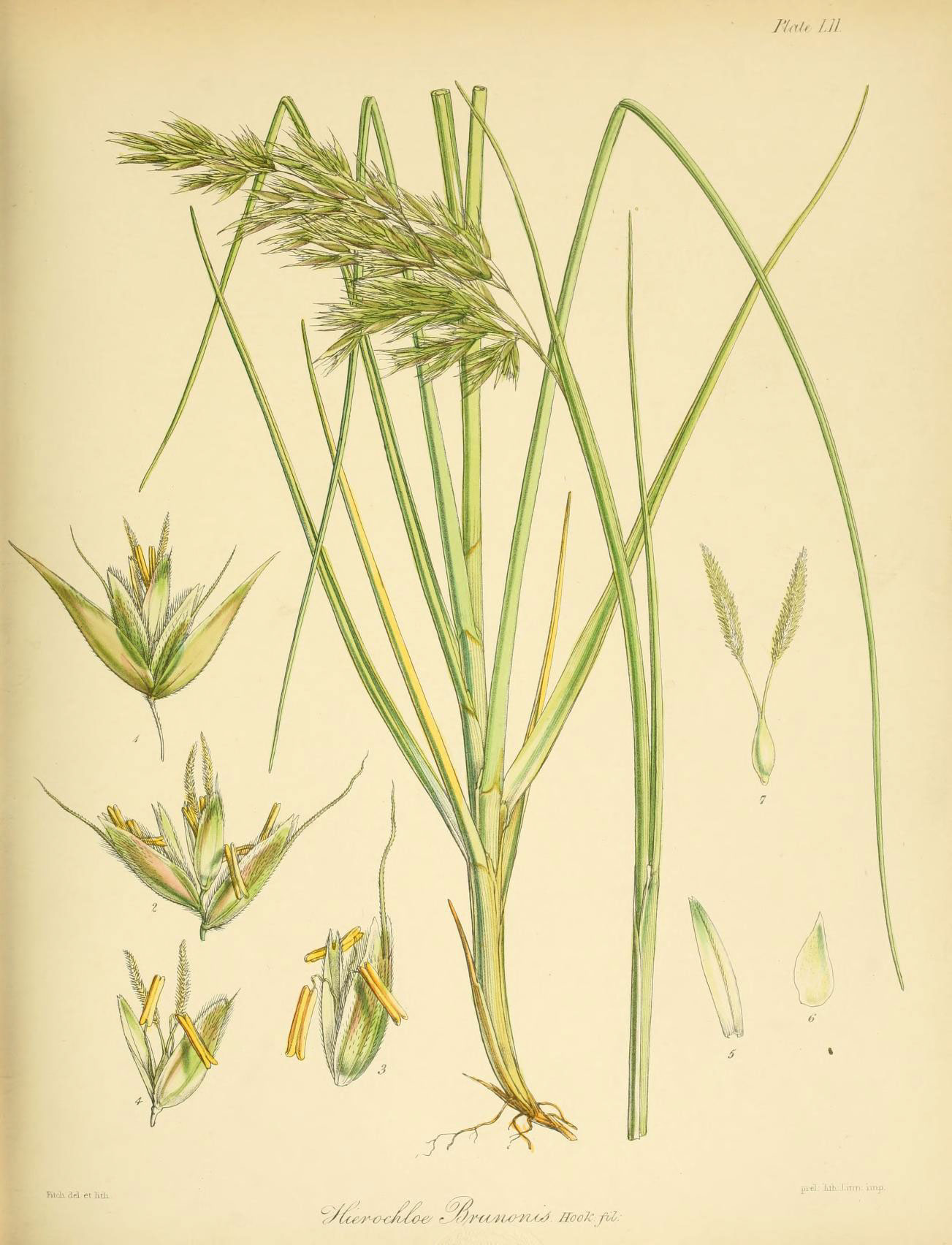
- Plate LII

Conservation status
- Naturally Uncommon (NZ TCS)

Scientific classification
- Kingdom: Plantae
- Clade: Tracheophytes
- Clade: Angiosperms
- Clade: Monocots
- Clade: Commelinids
- Order: Poales
- Family: Poaceae
- Subfamily: Pooideae
- Genus: Anthoxanthum
- Species: A. brunonis

Binomial name
- Anthoxanthum brunonis (Hook.f) Zotov

Synonyms
- Hierochloe brunonis Hook.f

= Anthoxanthum brunonis =

Species of grass

Anthoxanthum brunonis is a species of grass, native to the South Island of New Zealand and to the Auckland and Campbell Islands.

It was first described in 1845 by Joseph Dalton Hooker as Hierochloë Brunonis, the specific epithet, brunonis, being chosen to honour Robert Brown.

== Conservation status ==
In both 2009 and 2012 it was deemed to be "At Risk - Naturally Uncommon" under the New Zealand Threat Classification System, and this New Zealand classification was reaffirmed in 2018 (due to its restricted range) with the further comment that it is sparse.
