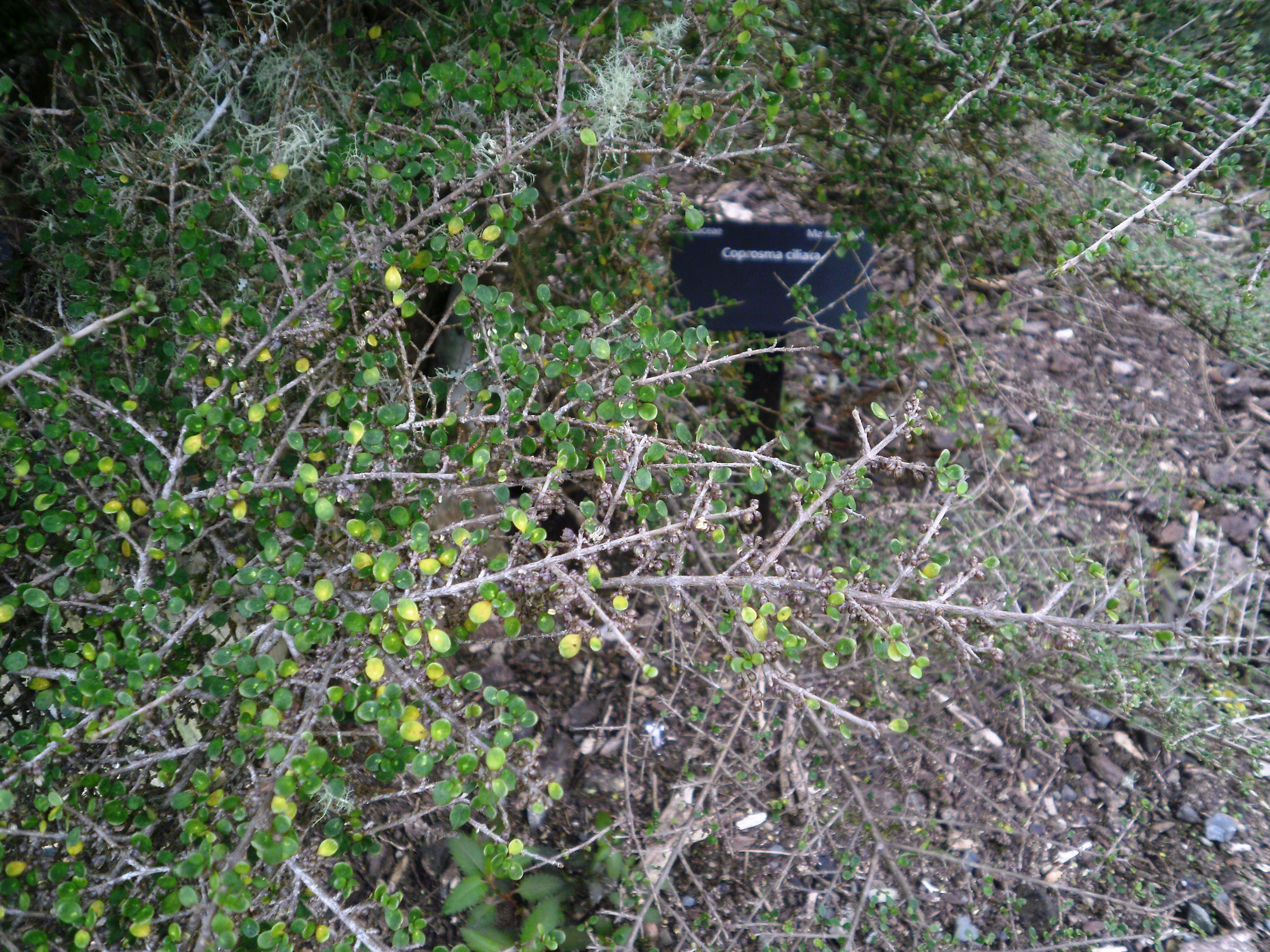

Scientific classification
- Kingdom: Plantae
- Clade: Tracheophytes
- Clade: Angiosperms
- Clade: Eudicots
- Clade: Asterids
- Order: Gentianales
- Family: Rubiaceae
- Genus: Coprosma
- Species: C. ciliata

Binomial name
- Coprosma ciliata Hook.f.

Synonyms
- Coprosma myrtillifolia Hook.f.; Coprosma ciliata var. virgata Hook.f.

= Coprosma ciliata =

Species of plant

Coprosma ciliata, is a shrub in the family Rubiaceae that is endemic to New Zealand. C. ciliata is found in the South Island from Lake Brunner southwards into Fiordland mostly west of the Southern Alps. The species prefers lowland forest where it often occurs beside streams, swamps and lakes.

C. ciliata grows up to 7 metres tall and has oval leaves that are bright green to olive-green.
