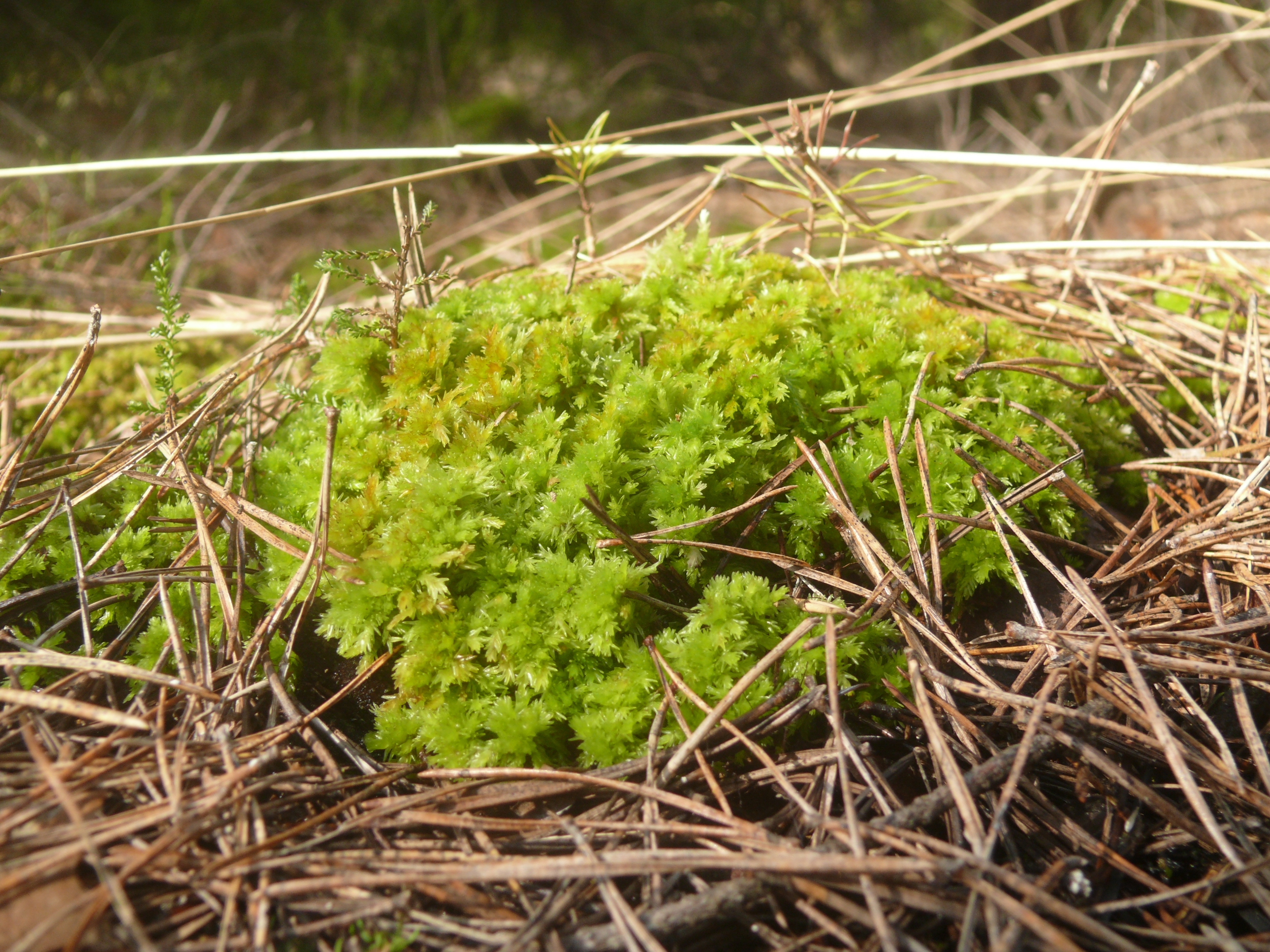

Scientific classification
- Kingdom: Plantae
- Division: Bryophyta
- Class: Sphagnopsida
- Order: Sphagnales
- Family: Sphagnaceae
- Genus: Sphagnum
- Species: S. compactum

Binomial name
- Sphagnum compactum Lam. & DC.

= Sphagnum compactum =

Species of moss

Sphagnum compactum, the compact bogmoss, is a species of moss belonging to the family Sphagnaceae.

It has cosmopolitan distribution.
