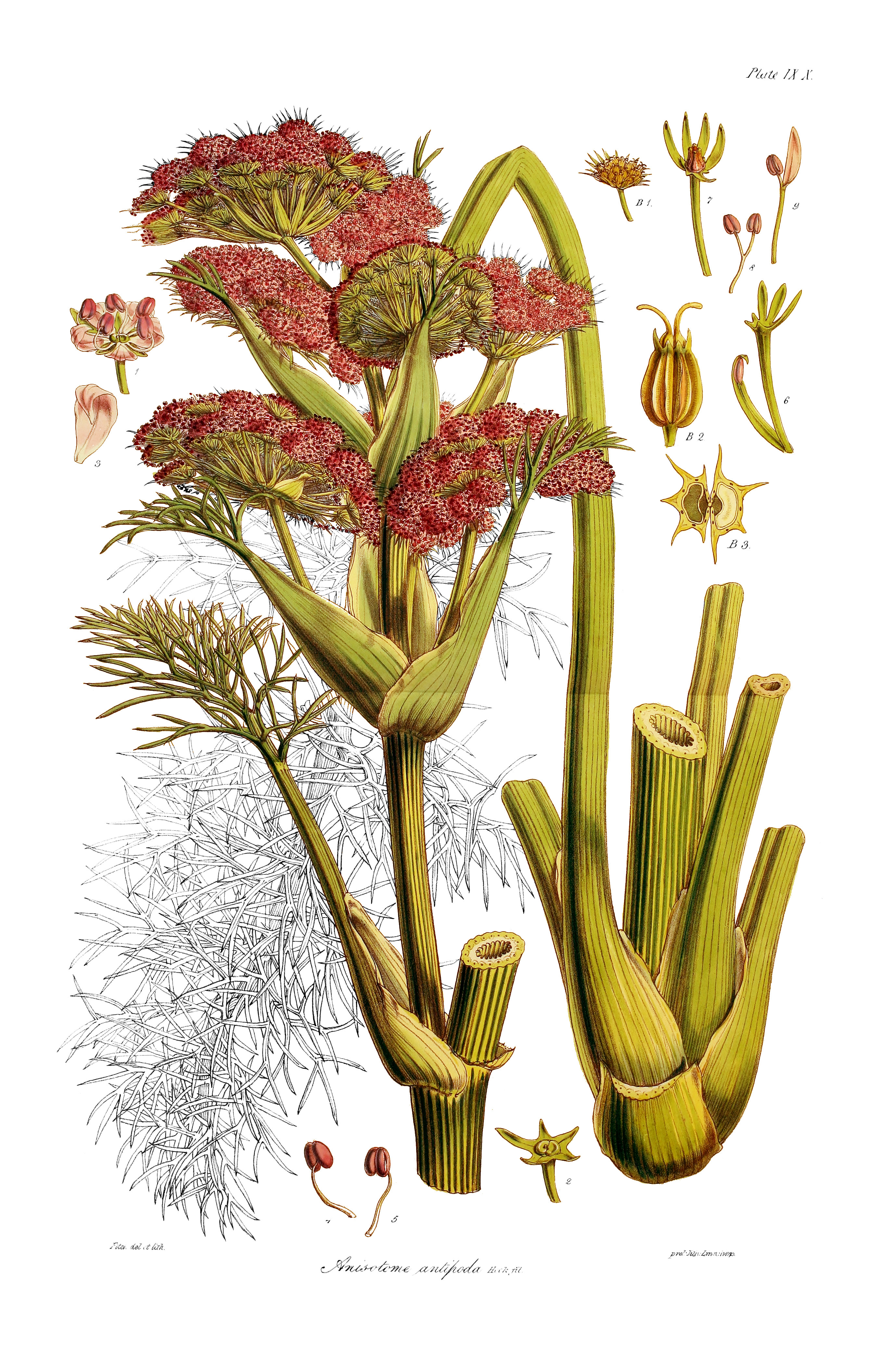
- Plates IX-X

Conservation status
- Naturally Uncommon (NZ TCS)

Scientific classification
- Kingdom: Plantae
- Clade: Tracheophytes
- Clade: Angiosperms
- Clade: Eudicots
- Clade: Asterids
- Order: Apiales
- Family: Apiaceae
- Genus: Anisotome
- Species: A. antipoda

Binomial name
- Anisotome antipoda Hook.f.

Synonyms
- Calosciadium antipodum (Hook.f.) Endl. ex Walp. Gingidium antipodum (Hook.f.) F.Muell.

= Anisotome antipoda =

Species of flowering plant

Anisotome antipoda is a species of flowering plant in the family Apiaceae, which is endemic to the Auckland, Campbell and Antipodes Islands.

== Description ==
Anisotome antipoda are perennial plants which grow up to 1.2 m tall. The basal leaves are ovate to oblong and from 0.1 to 0.6 m wide by 0.06 to 0.15 m long. They are 3-4-pinnate, with widely divergent divisions occurring in many planes. There are 5–7 pairs of leaflets, which end in stiff sharp points. The leaf sheaths on the upper stem are swollen. The stalk of the inflorescence (peduncle) is 20–100 mm long and there are often several at a node. The axis of the inflorescence is 0.6–1.2 m by 0.1–0.3 m. The 10–30 stalks of individual flowers (pedicels) are 0.5 mm long. The styles are stout and 0.5 to 1 mm long, and the stigmas are reddish.

The flowers are dark pink to magenta and are seen from October to March with fruiting occurring from March to May.

== Distribution and habitat ==
It is found on the Auckland, Campbell and Antipodes Islands, from the coast to the mountains. It is found on cliffs, rock ledges, in sodden areas of exposed peat and in herbfields, and is often found growing with A. latifolia.

== Conservation status ==
It was classified as "At Risk - Naturally Uncommon", in 2009, 2012 and again in 2018, because of its restricted range.

== Taxonomy and naming ==
It was first described by Joseph Dalton Hooker in 1844 from plants collected when he served as surgeon on HMS Erebus during the Antarctic voyage of H.M. discovery ships Erebus and Terror. The genus name, Anisotome, is derived from Greek and means "unequal sided". The specific epithet, antipoda, is an adjective meaning "on the opposite side (foot)" (of the world).

== Cultivation ==
The plant is easy to grow from fresh seed but often collapses suddenly despite apparently flourishing.
