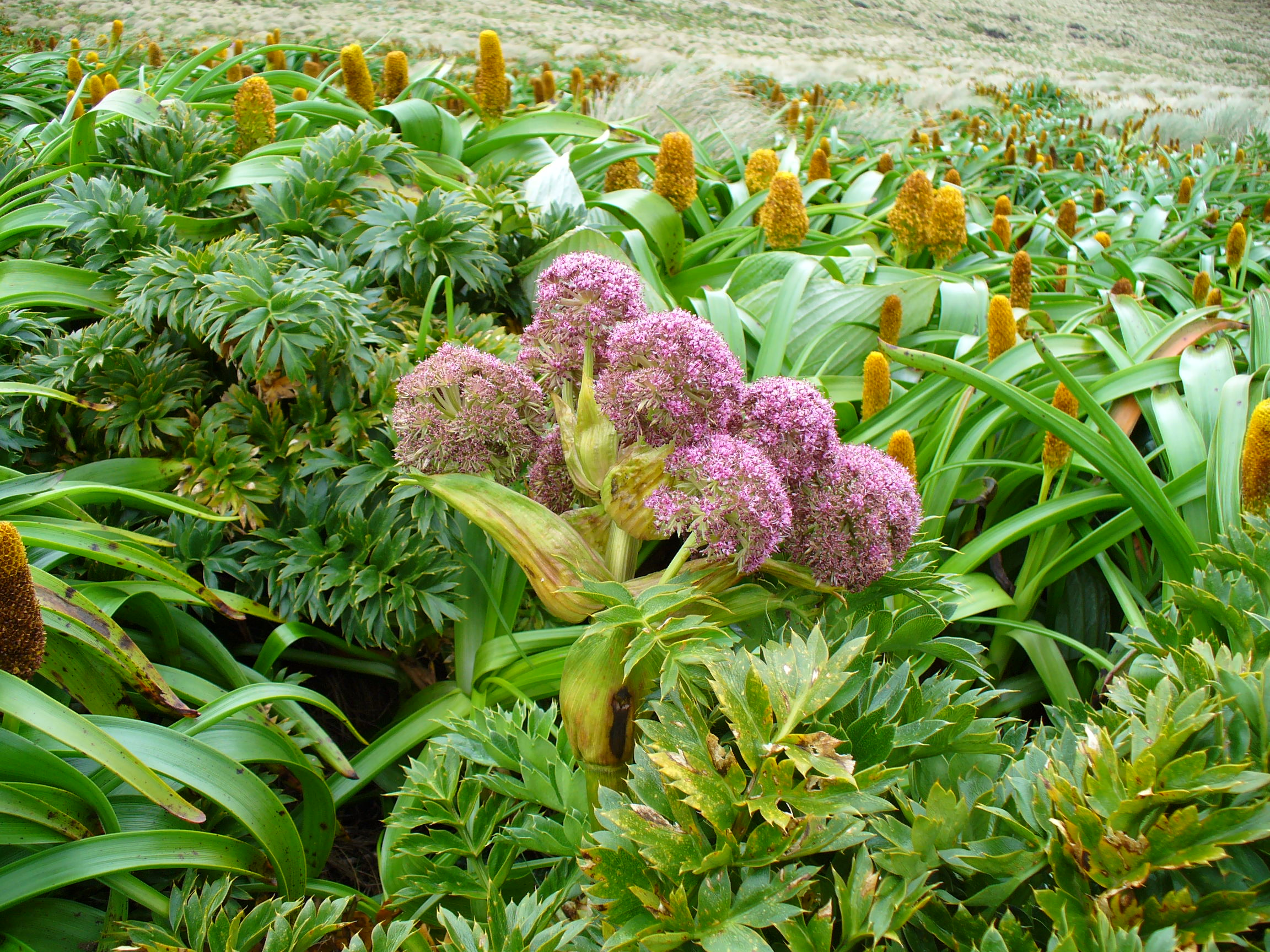
- Anisotome latifolia

Scientific classification
- Kingdom: Plantae
- Clade: Tracheophytes
- Clade: Angiosperms
- Clade: Eudicots
- Clade: Asterids
- Order: Apiales
- Family: Apiaceae
- Subfamily: Apioideae
- Tribe: Aciphylleae
- Genus: Anisotome; Hook.f.

Species
- including: Anisotome antipoda; Anisotome aromatica; Anisotome capillifolia; Anisotome deltoidea; Anisotome filifolia; Anisotome flexuosa; Anisotome haastii; Anisotome imbricata; Anisotome latifolia; Anisotome lyallii; Anisotome pilifera; Anisotome procumbens

= Anisotome =

Genus of flowering plants

Anisotome is a genus of flowering plants in the family Apiaceae. It has 16 species and is found in Australia and New Zealand.
