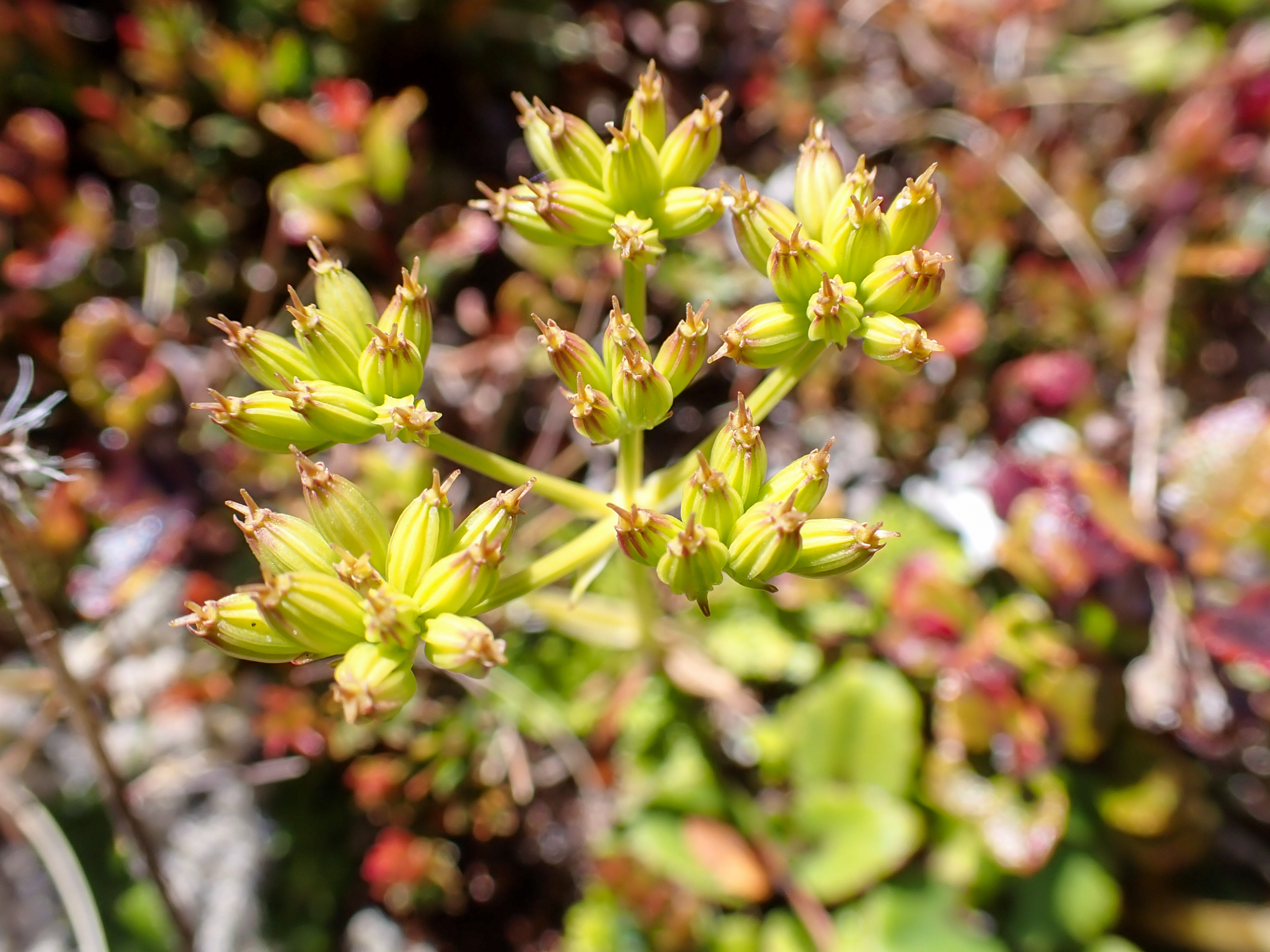
- Anisotome aromatica in Nelson Lakes National Park

Conservation status
- Not Threatened (NZ TCS)

Scientific classification
- Kingdom: Plantae
- Clade: Embryophytes
- Clade: Tracheophytes
- Clade: Spermatophytes
- Clade: Angiosperms
- Clade: Eudicots
- Clade: Asterids
- Order: Apiales
- Family: Apiaceae
- Genus: Anisotome
- Species: A. aromatica

Binomial name
- Anisotome aromatica Hook.f.

= Anisotome aromatica =

Species of flowering plant

Anisotome aromatica, commonly known as aromatic aniseed, kopoti, or common aniseed, is a species of plant, endemic to New Zealand.

== Description ==
A small plant with white flowers, bunches of flowers coming off a single stalk, and divaricating prostrate leaves.

== Range ==
Both islands of New Zealand.

== Habitat ==
Subarctic and subalpine areas.

== Etymology ==
The specific epithet aromatica refers to its smell.

== Taxonomy ==
Anisotome aromatica contains the following varieties:

- Anisotome aromatica var. aromatica
- Anisotome aromatica var. flabellifolia
- Anisotome aromatica var. incisa
- Anisotome aromatica var. major
- Anisotome aromatica var. obtusa
- Anisotome aromatica var. pinnatisecta
