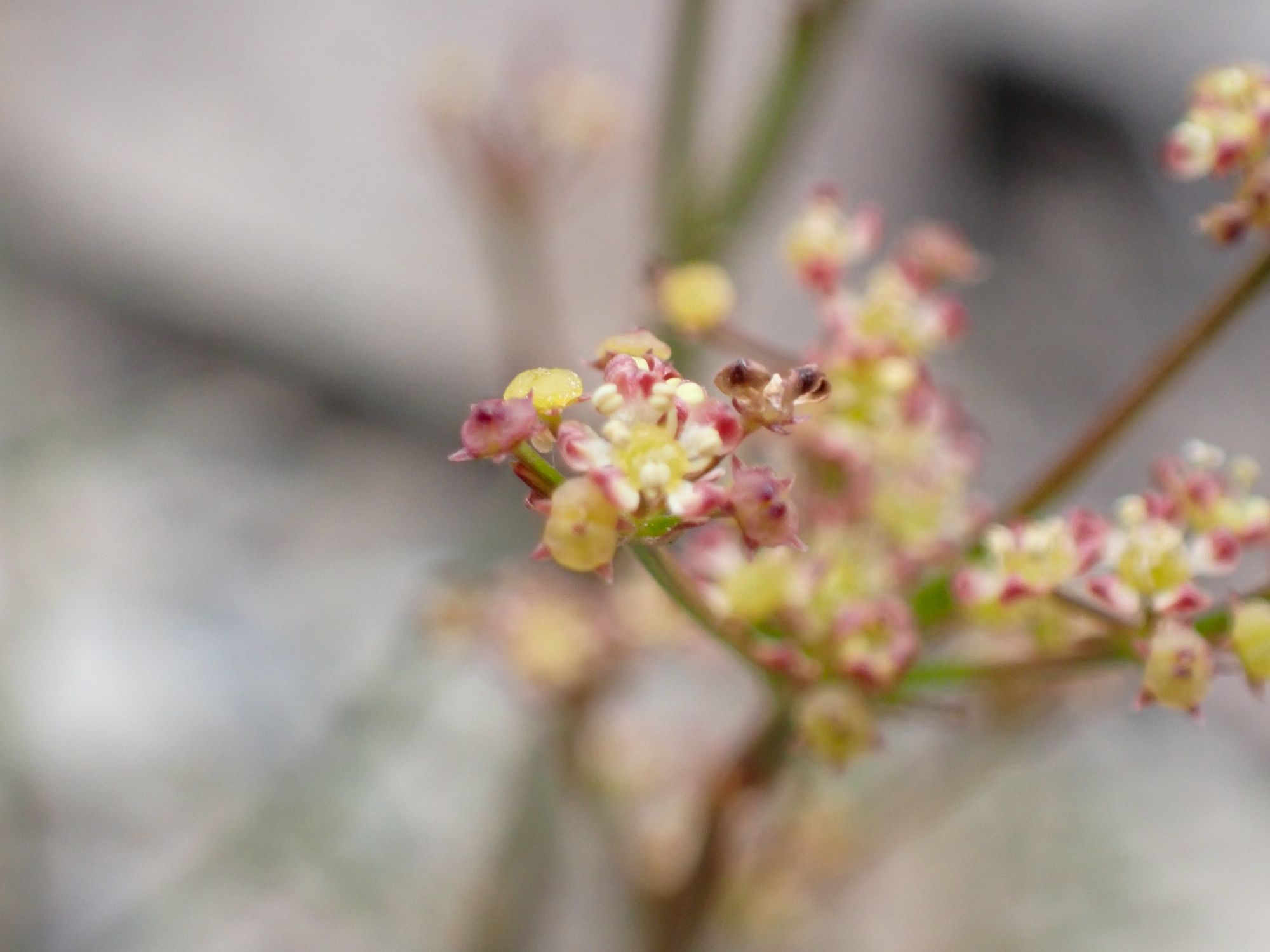
- Anisotome filifolia in Nelson Lakes National Park

Conservation status
- Not Threatened (NZ TCS)

Scientific classification
- Kingdom: Plantae
- Clade: Tracheophytes
- Clade: Angiosperms
- Clade: Eudicots
- Clade: Asterids
- Order: Apiales
- Family: Apiaceae
- Genus: Anisotome
- Species: A. filifolia

Binomial name
- Anisotome filifolia (Hook.f.) Cockayne & Laing

= Anisotome filifolia =

Species of flowering plant

Anisotome filifolia is a species of flowering plant, endemic to New Zealand. Its seeds are wind-dispersed, and is montane.

== Description ==
A small plant, growing up to 30cm in height, with very thin pinnae.

== Range ==
This species is known solely from the South Island of New Zealand.

== Ecology ==
The rust Puccinia namua grows exclusively on this species. Hares also browse on it.

== Etymology ==
Filifolia means 'thread-leaves' in Latin, which can be translated as 'thread-leaved'.
