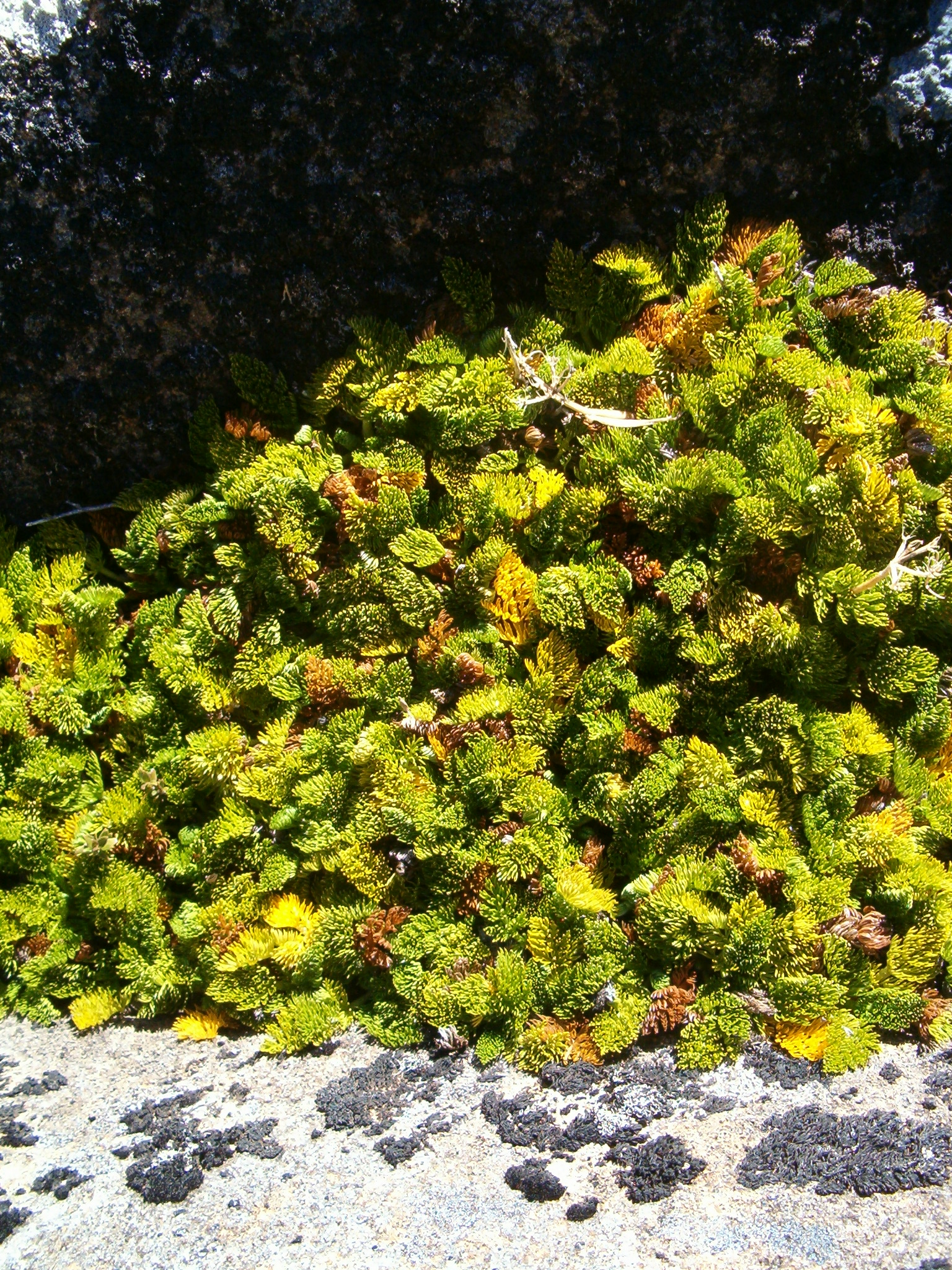

Scientific classification
- Kingdom: Plantae
- Clade: Tracheophytes
- Clade: Angiosperms
- Clade: Eudicots
- Clade: Asterids
- Order: Apiales
- Family: Apiaceae
- Genus: Anisotome
- Species: A. procumbens

Binomial name
- Anisotome procumbens (F.Muell.) C.J.Webb

Synonyms
- Gingidium procumbens F.Muell.; Aciphylla procumbens (F.Muell.) Benth.

= Anisotome procumbens =

Species of flowering plant

Anisotome procumbens, the mountain celery, is a small, perennial herb endemic to the Australian State of Tasmania. It is primarily found in high-elevation habitats in the west and south-west of the island.

== Taxonomy ==
Anisotome procumbens was first described as Gingidium procumbens by Ferdinand von Mueller from plants collected at Mount La Perouse, Tasmania by A. Oldfield.

== Description ==
Anisotome procumbens is a mat- or cushion-forming perennial herb with glossy, bright green, deeply divided leaves in a basal rosette and an umbellate inflorescence typical of the family. Some of the dolerite mountaintops of south-eastern Tasmania, such as Adamsons Peak and Hartz Peak have healthy populations of A. procumbens. At these locations, individual mats can reach over 2 m in diameter.
