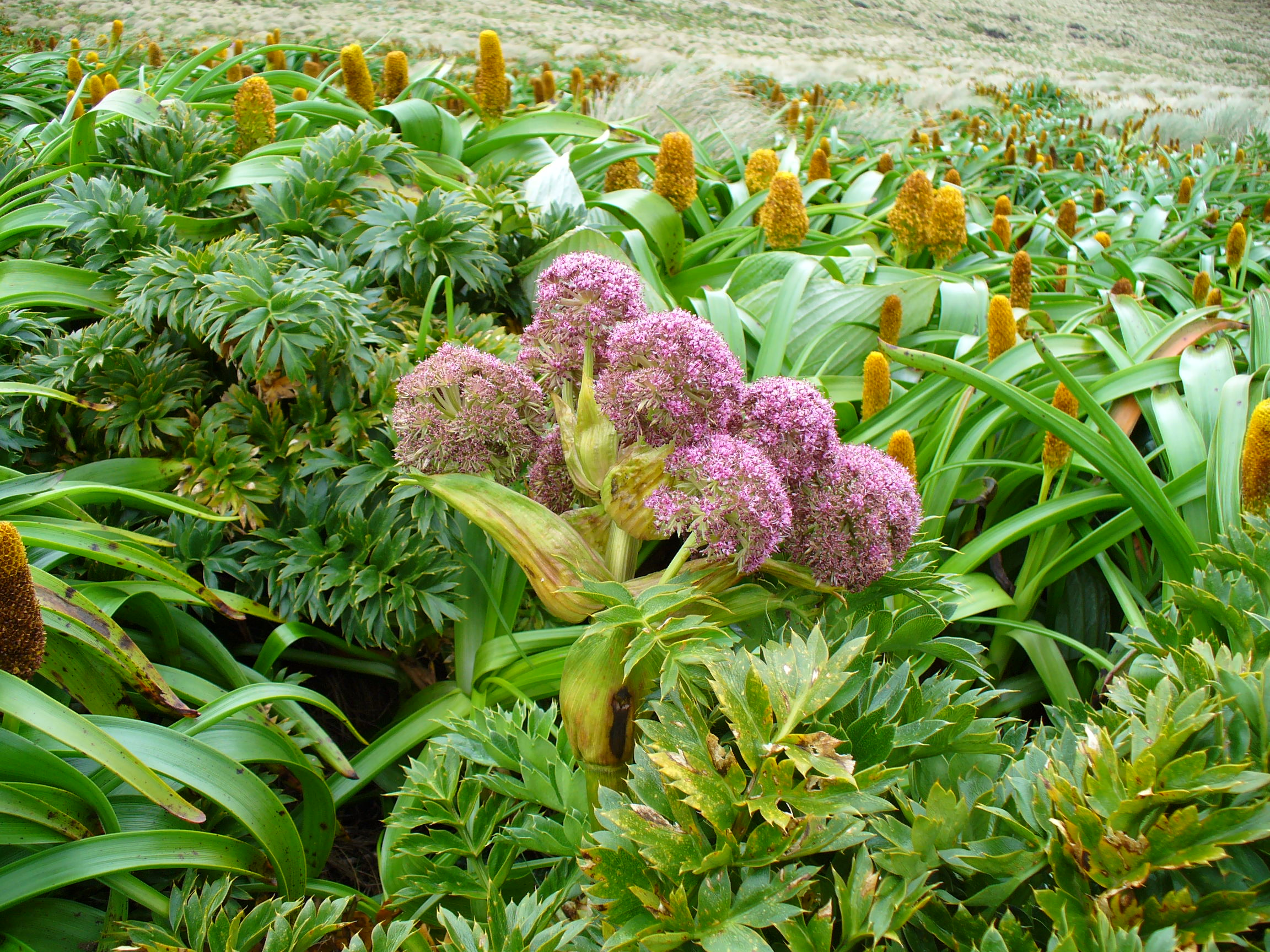
- Anisotome latifolia on Campbell Island, with Bulbinella rossii in the background.

Conservation status
- Naturally Uncommon (NZ TCS)

Scientific classification
- Kingdom: Plantae
- Clade: Tracheophytes
- Clade: Angiosperms
- Clade: Eudicots
- Clade: Asterids
- Order: Apiales
- Family: Apiaceae
- Genus: Anisotome
- Species: A. latifolia

Binomial name
- Anisotome latifolia Hook.f.

Synonyms
- Ligusticum latifolium (Hook.f.) Hook.f.; Calosciadium latifolium (Hook.f.) Endl. ex Walp.; Aciphylla latifolia (Hook.f.) Cockayne

= Anisotome latifolia =

Campbell Island carrot

Species of flowering plant

Anisotome latifolia, commonly known as the Campbell Island carrot, is a species of plant in the genus Anisotome of the carrot family (Apiaceae). It is native to the Auckland and Campbell Islands in the subantarctic regions of the South Pacific.

== Description ==
Anisotome latifolia is a large and robust perennial herb, growing up to 2 m (6 ft 7 in) in height. The leathery basal leaves are 300–600 mm (12–24 in) long and 100–200 mm (3.9–7.9 in) wide, 2-pinnate with 5-7 pairs of dark to yellow-green leaflets. The inflorescence axis grows up to 2 m (6 ft 7 in), with a 10–15 mm (0.39–0.59 in) diameter at the first node. The flowers vary from off-white to a creamy pink in colour. The plant flowers from October to February and fruits from January to March.

== Distribution and habitat ==
The plant is endemic to New Zealand's subantarctic Auckland and Campbell Islands, where it is a striking component of the megaherb community. It occurs from the coast up to the tops of the island ranges on peaty ground among tussocks and other megaherbs, though more rarely under low forest. It is most abundant at lower altitudes and where the vegetation is not subject to browsing by introduced animals.

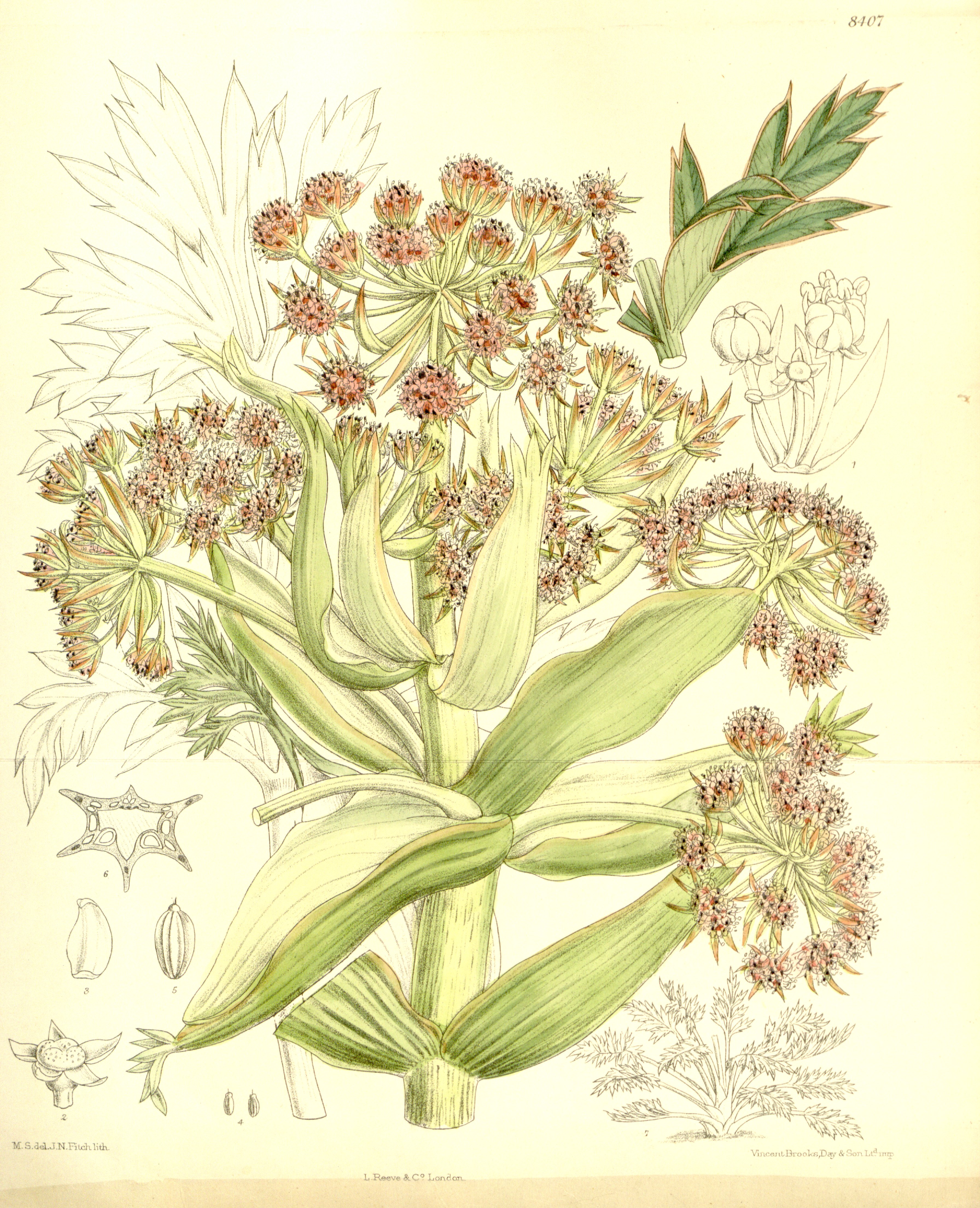
Lithograph in Curtis's Botanical Magazine by John Nugent Fitch from drawing by Matilda Smith, 1911.

== Cultivation ==
The plant is easy to grow from fresh seed in deep, peaty, permanently moist soil, though it does not tolerate hot weather.
