= List of Elaphoglossum species =

Elaphoglossum is a genus of ferns in the family Dryopteridaceae, subfamily Elaphoglossoideae, in the Pteridophyte Phylogeny Group classification of 2016 (PPG I). The genus has a large number of species. PPG I suggested there were about 600; Plants of the World Online and the Checklist of Ferns and Lycophytes of the World both listed at least 730 as of January 2020. The list below is from Plants of the World Online.

== A ==
- Elaphoglossum accedens Christ
- Elaphoglossum achroalepis (Baker) C.Chr.
- Elaphoglossum acrocarpum (Mart.) T.Moore
- Elaphoglossum acrostichoides (Hook. & Grev.) Schelpe
- Elaphoglossum actinolepis C.Chr.
- Elaphoglossum actinotrichum (Mart.) T.Moore
- Elaphoglossum acutifolium Rosenst.
- Elaphoglossum acutum (Fée) Brade
- Elaphoglossum adrianae A.Rojas
- Elaphoglossum × adulterinum Lorence
- Elaphoglossum aemulum (Kaulf.) Brack.
- Elaphoglossum affine (M.Martens & Galeotti) T.Moore
- Elaphoglossum alan-smithii Mickel
- Elaphoglossum alatum Gaudich.
- Elaphoglossum albomarginatum A.R.Sm.
- Elaphoglossum alfredii Rosenst.
- Elaphoglossum alipes Mickel
- Elaphoglossum alpestre (Gardner) T.Moore
- Elaphoglossum alpinum Ballard
- Elaphoglossum alvaradoanum A.Rojas
- Elaphoglossum ambiguum (Mett. ex C.Chr.) Alston
- Elaphoglossum amblyphyllum Bell
- Elaphoglossum amorimii F.B.Matos & Mickel
- Elaphoglossum amphioxys Mickel
- Elaphoglossum amplissimum (Fée) Christ
- Elaphoglossum amplum Mickel
- Elaphoglossum amygdalifolium Christ
- Elaphoglossum anceps Mickel
- Elaphoglossum andersonii Mickel
- Elaphoglossum andicola T.Moore
- Elaphoglossum andreanum Christ
- Elaphoglossum angamarcanum C.Chr.
- Elaphoglossum angulatum (Blume) T.Moore
- Elaphoglossum angustatum (Schrader) Hieron.
- Elaphoglossum angustifrons Holttum
- Elaphoglossum angustioblongum A.Rojas
- Elaphoglossum angustissimum C.Chr.
- Elaphoglossum angustius Mickel
- Elaphoglossum angustum (Fée) Christ
- Elaphoglossum annamense C.Chr. & Tardieu
- Elaphoglossum anthracinum A.Vasco, Mickel & R.C.Moran
- Elaphoglossum antioquianum Hieron.
- Elaphoglossum antisanae C.Chr.
- Elaphoglossum aphlebium T.Moore
- Elaphoglossum apiculatum Holttum
- Elaphoglossum apodum (Kaulf.) Schott
- Elaphoglossum apoense Holttum
- Elaphoglossum apparicioi Brade
- Elaphoglossum appressum Mickel
- Elaphoglossum arachnidoideum Mickel
- Elaphoglossum arachnoideum Holttum
- Elaphoglossum archboldii Copel.
- Elaphoglossum aschersonii Hieron.
- Elaphoglossum aspidiolepis (Baker) C.Chr.
- Elaphoglossum asterolepis (Baker) C.Chr.
- Elaphoglossum atrobarbatum Mickel
- Elaphoglossum aubertii (Desv.) T.Moore
- Elaphoglossum auricomum (Kunze) T.Moore
- Elaphoglossum auripilum Christ
- Elaphoglossum austromarquesense Rouhan & Lorence
- Elaphoglossum avaratraense Rakotondr.
- Elaphoglossum ayopayense M.Kessler & Mickel

== B ==
- Elaphoglossum backhousianum T.Moore
- Elaphoglossum badinii Novelino
- Elaphoglossum bahiense Rosenst.
- Elaphoglossum bakeri Christ
- Elaphoglossum baquianorum A.Rojas
- Elaphoglossum barbatum Hieron.
- Elaphoglossum barnebyanum A.Rojas
- Elaphoglossum barteri (Baker) C.Chr.
- Elaphoglossum basitruncatum Brownlie
- Elaphoglossum beaurepairei (Fée) Brade
- Elaphoglossum beauverdii Damazio
- Elaphoglossum beckeri Brade
- Elaphoglossum beddomei Sledge
- Elaphoglossum beitelii (Mickel) A.Rojas
- Elaphoglossum bellermannianum (Klotzsch) T.Moore
- Elaphoglossum betancurii A.Rojas
- Elaphoglossum biolleyi Christ
- Elaphoglossum bittneri A.Rojas
- Elaphoglossum blanchetii (Mett.) C.Chr.
- Elaphoglossum blepharis A.Vasco, Mickel & R.C.Moran
- Elaphoglossum blepharoglottis Mickel
- Elaphoglossum blumeanum J.Sm.
- Elaphoglossum bolanicum Rosenst.
- Elaphoglossum bolliviani Rosenst.
- Elaphoglossum bonapartii Rosenst.
- Elaphoglossum boquetense Mickel
- Elaphoglossum boragineum Christ
- Elaphoglossum boryanum (Fée) T.Moore
- Elaphoglossum boudriei Mickel
- Elaphoglossum brachyneuron (Fée) J.Sm.
- Elaphoglossum bradeanum L.C.N.Melo & Salino
- Elaphoglossum brenesii Mickel
- Elaphoglossum brevifolium Holttum
- Elaphoglossum brevipes (Kunze) T.Moore
- Elaphoglossum brevipetiolatum F.B.Matos & Mickel
- Elaphoglossum brevissimum Mickel
- Elaphoglossum brunneum Copel.
- Elaphoglossum bryogenes Mickel
- Elaphoglossum buchtienii Rosenst.
- Elaphoglossum burchellii (Baker) C.Chr.

== C ==
- Elaphoglossum × cadetii Lorence
- Elaphoglossum caespitosum (Sodiro) Christ
- Elaphoglossum calanasanicum Holttum
- Elaphoglossum callifolium (Blume) J.Sm.
- Elaphoglossum camptolepis Mickel
- Elaphoglossum campylolepium J.P.Roux
- Elaphoglossum capuronii Tardieu
- Elaphoglossum cardenasii W.H.Wagner
- Elaphoglossum cardioglossum Mickel
- Elaphoglossum cardiophyllum (Hook.) T.Moore
- Elaphoglossum caricifolium Mickel
- Elaphoglossum caridadae A.Rojas
- Elaphoglossum caroliae Mickel
- Elaphoglossum carolinense Hosok.
- Elaphoglossum carrascoense M.Kessler & Mickel
- Elaphoglossum casanense Rosenst.
- Elaphoglossum castaneum Diels
- Elaphoglossum catenatum F.B.Matos & R.C.Moran
- Elaphoglossum caudulatum Mickel
- Elaphoglossum cedralense A.Rojas
- Elaphoglossum cerussatum Tardieu
- Elaphoglossum ceylanicum Krajina ex Sledge
- Elaphoglossum chartaceum (Baker) C.Chr.
- Elaphoglossum chevalieri Christ
- Elaphoglossum chloodes Mickel
- Elaphoglossum chodatii C.Chr.
- Elaphoglossum choquetangae M.Kessler & Mickel
- Elaphoglossum christianeae Mickel
- Elaphoglossum christii C.Chr.
- Elaphoglossum chrysolepis (Fée) Alston
- Elaphoglossum chrysopogon Mickel
- Elaphoglossum ciliatosquama A.Rojas
- Elaphoglossum ciliatum (C.Presl) T.Moore
- Elaphoglossum cinereum C.Chr.
- Elaphoglossum cinnamomeum (Baker) Diels
- Elaphoglossum cismense Rosenst.
- Elaphoglossum clathratum F.B.Matos & R.C.Moran
- Elaphoglossum clewellianum Mickel
- Elaphoglossum cocosense Mickel
- Elaphoglossum coimbra-buenoi Brade
- Elaphoglossum commissurale L.C.N.Melo & Salino
- Elaphoglossum commutatum Alderw.
- Elaphoglossum concinnum Mickel
- Elaphoglossum conforme (Sw.) Schott
- Elaphoglossum confusum Christ
- Elaphoglossum consobrinum T.Moore
- Elaphoglossum conspersum Christ
- Elaphoglossum corazonense Christ
- Elaphoglossum corderoanum Christ
- Elaphoglossum coriaceum Bonap.
- Elaphoglossum coriifolium Mickel
- Elaphoglossum correae Mickel
- Elaphoglossum costaricense Christ
- Elaphoglossum cotapatense M.Kessler & Mickel
- Elaphoglossum coto-brusense A.Rojas
- Elaphoglossum cotoi A.Rojas
- Elaphoglossum coursii Tardieu
- Elaphoglossum craspedotum Copel.
- Elaphoglossum crassicaule Copel.
- Elaphoglossum crassifolium (Gaudich.) W.R.Anderson & Crosby
- Elaphoglossum crassinerve T.Moore
- Elaphoglossum crassipes Diels
- Elaphoglossum cremersii Mickel
- Elaphoglossum crinitum (L.) Christ
- Elaphoglossum crispatum Mickel
- Elaphoglossum croatii Mickel
- Elaphoglossum cruegerianum (Kunze) C.Chr.
- Elaphoglossum cruzense M.Kessler & Mickel
- Elaphoglossum cubense (Mett.) C.Chr.
- Elaphoglossum curtii Rosenst.
- Elaphoglossum curvans (Kunze) A.Rojas
- Elaphoglossum cuspidatum (Willd.) T.Moore

== D ==
- Elaphoglossum dannoritzeri M.Kessler
- Elaphoglossum davidsei Mickel
- Elaphoglossum decaryanum Tardieu
- Elaphoglossum deckenii (Kuhn) C.Chr.
- Elaphoglossum decoratum (Kunze) T.Moore
- Elaphoglossum decurrens (Desv.) T.Moore
- Elaphoglossum decursivum Mickel
- Elaphoglossum delasotae Mickel
- Elaphoglossum delgadilloanum A.Rojas
- Elaphoglossum delicatulum Mickel
- Elaphoglossum deltoideum (Sodiro) Christ
- Elaphoglossum dendricola Christ
- Elaphoglossum denudatum (Jenman) Maxon ex C.V.Morton
- Elaphoglossum deorsum (H.Karst.) Vareschi
- Elaphoglossum didymoglossoides C.Chr.
- Elaphoglossum diminutum Mickel
- Elaphoglossum dimorphum (Hook. & Grev.) T.Moore
- Elaphoglossum discolor C.Chr.
- Elaphoglossum dissitifrons Mickel
- Elaphoglossum doanense L.D.Gómez
- Elaphoglossum dolichopus Mickel
- Elaphoglossum dombeyanum (Fée) Hieron.
- Elaphoglossum dominii Krajina
- Elaphoglossum drabifolium Christ
- Elaphoglossum drakensbergense Schelpe
- Elaphoglossum dumrongii Tagawa & K.Iwats.
- Elaphoglossum dutrae Brade

== E–F ==
- Elaphoglossum eatonianum C.Chr.
- Elaphoglossum ecuadorense C.Chr.
- Elaphoglossum edwallii Rosenst.
- Elaphoglossum eggersii Christ
- Elaphoglossum ekmanii C.Chr.
- Elaphoglossum elegantipes Mickel
- Elaphoglossum elkeae M.Kessler & Mickel
- Elaphoglossum ellenbergianum M.Kessler & Mickel
- Elaphoglossum ellipticifolium A.Rojas
- Elaphoglossum engelii Christ
- Elaphoglossum engleri C.Chr.
- Elaphoglossum entecnum Mickel
- Elaphoglossum erinaceum T.Moore
- Elaphoglossum eriopus Mickel
- Elaphoglossum ernestii Brade
- Elaphoglossum erythrolepis (Fée) T.Moore
- Elaphoglossum eutecnum (Mickel) A.Rojas
- Elaphoglossum eximiiforme Mickel
- Elaphoglossum eximium (Mett.) Christ
- Elaphoglossum exsertipes Mickel
- Elaphoglossum faurei Copel.
- Elaphoglossum favigerum Holttum
- Elaphoglossum feei (Bory) T.Moore
- Elaphoglossum feejeense Brack.
- Elaphoglossum fendleri F.B.Matos & A.Vasco
- Elaphoglossum filipes Rosenst.
- Elaphoglossum flaccidum (Fée) T.Moore
- Elaphoglossum florencei Rouhan
- Elaphoglossum foldatsii Vareschi
- Elaphoglossum fonki T.Moore
- Elaphoglossum forsythii-majoris Christ
- Elaphoglossum fortipes Mickel
- Elaphoglossum fournierianum L.D.Gómez
- Elaphoglossum fuertesii Brause
- Elaphoglossum furcatum (L.f.) Christ
- Elaphoglossum furfuraceum Christ

== G ==
- Elaphoglossum gamboanum A.Rojas
- Elaphoglossum gardnerianum (Kunze) T.Moore
- Elaphoglossum gayanum (Fée) T.Moore
- Elaphoglossum gemmatum A.Vasco
- Elaphoglossum gertii Sehnem
- Elaphoglossum gillespiei Copel.
- Elaphoglossum glabellum J.Sm.
- Elaphoglossum glabratum (Mett.) T.Moore
- Elaphoglossum glabrescens A.Vasco
- Elaphoglossum glaucescens Rosenst.
- Elaphoglossum glaucum T.Moore
- Elaphoglossum glaziovii (Fée) Brade
- Elaphoglossum gloeorrhizum Mickel
- Elaphoglossum glossoides Christ
- Elaphoglossum glossophyllum Hieron.
- Elaphoglossum gomezianum A.Rojas
- Elaphoglossum gonzalesiae M.Kessler & Mickel
- Elaphoglossum gorgoneum (Kaulf.) Brack.
- Elaphoglossum gossypinum C.Chr.
- Elaphoglossum gracilifolium J.P.Roux
- Elaphoglossum gracilipes (Fée) C.Chr.
- Elaphoglossum gracillimum Mickel
- Elaphoglossum grallator Mickel
- Elaphoglossum gramineum (Jenman) Urb.
- Elaphoglossum gratum (Fée) T.Moore
- Elaphoglossum grayumii Mickel
- Elaphoglossum guamanianum C.Chr.
- Elaphoglossum guatemalense (Klotzsch) T.Moore
- Elaphoglossum guentheri Rosenst.

== H ==
- Elaphoglossum habbemense Copel.
- Elaphoglossum hainanense Y.J. Yang, J.P. Shu & Y.H. Yan
- Elaphoglossum haitiense C.Chr.
- Elaphoglossum hammelianum A.Rojas
- Elaphoglossum hartwegii T.Moore
- Elaphoglossum hassleri Christ
- Elaphoglossum hayesii (Mett.) Maxon
- Elaphoglossum haynaldii (Sodiro) I.Losch
- Elaphoglossum heliconiifolium (Sodiro) Christ
- Elaphoglossum hellwigianum Rosenst.
- Elaphoglossum heringeri Brade
- Elaphoglossum herminieri (Bory & Fée) T.Moore
- Elaphoglossum herpestes Mickel
- Elaphoglossum herrerae A.Rojas
- Elaphoglossum heterochroum Mickel
- Elaphoglossum heteroglossum Mickel
- Elaphoglossum heterolepis T.Moore
- Elaphoglossum heterolepium Alderw.
- Elaphoglossum heteromorphum (Klotzsch) T.Moore
- Elaphoglossum × heterophlebium Lorence
- Elaphoglossum heterostipes Holttum
- Elaphoglossum hieracioides Mickel
- Elaphoglossum hieronymi C.Chr.
- Elaphoglossum hikenii C.Chr.
- Elaphoglossum hirtipes Brade
- Elaphoglossum hirtum C.Chr.
- Elaphoglossum hispaniolicum Maxon
- Elaphoglossum hoffmannii Christ
- Elaphoglossum hornei C.Chr.
- Elaphoglossum horridulum J.Sm.
- Elaphoglossum huacsaro (Ruiz) Christ
- Elaphoglossum humbertii C.Chr.
- Elaphoglossum hurlimannii Guillaumin
- Elaphoglossum hyalinum Christ
- Elaphoglossum hybridum (Bory) Brack.
- Elaphoglossum hystrix (Kunze) T.Moore

== I–J ==
- Elaphoglossum idenburgensis Holttum
- Elaphoglossum iguapense Brade
- Elaphoglossum imthurnii Krajina
- Elaphoglossum inaequalifolium C.Chr.
- Elaphoglossum inciens Mickel
- Elaphoglossum incognitum A.Rojas
- Elaphoglossum incubus Mickel
- Elaphoglossum indrapurae Holttum
- Elaphoglossum inquisitivum M.Kessler & Mickel
- Elaphoglossum insigne (Fée) Brade
- Elaphoglossum insulare C.Chr.
- Elaphoglossum interruptum Rosenst.
- Elaphoglossum ipshookense Mickel
- Elaphoglossum isabelense Brause
- Elaphoglossum isophyllum (Sodiro) Christ
- Elaphoglossum itatiayense Rosenst.
- Elaphoglossum jaliscanum Mickel
- Elaphoglossum jinoteganum A.Rojas
- Elaphoglossum jucundum Mickel
- Elaphoglossum juruense A.Samp.

== K–L ==
- Elaphoglossum kessleri A.Rojas
- Elaphoglossum killipianum Mickel
- Elaphoglossum killipii Mickel
- Elaphoglossum kivuense Schelpe
- Elaphoglossum kuhnii Hieron.
- Elaphoglossum kusaiense H.Itô
- Elaphoglossum lagesianum Rosenst.
- Elaphoglossum lalitae L.D.Gómez
- Elaphoglossum laminarioides (Bory) T.Moore
- Elaphoglossum lanatum (Bojer ex Baker) Lorence
- Elaphoglossum lanceiforme Mickel
- Elaphoglossum lanceum Mickel
- Elaphoglossum lancifolium (Desv.) C.V.Morton
- Elaphoglossum langsdorffii T.Moore
- Elaphoglossum lanigerum Mickel
- Elaphoglossum lankesteri Mickel
- Elaphoglossum lasioglottis Mickel
- Elaphoglossum lasiolepium J.P.Roux
- Elaphoglossum lastii (Baker) C.Chr.
- Elaphoglossum latebricola Vareschi
- Elaphoglossum latemarginatum Holttum
- Elaphoglossum latevagans Mickel
- Elaphoglossum latifolium (Sw.) J.Sm.
- Elaphoglossum latum (Mickel) Mickel
- Elaphoglossum laurifolium (Thouars) T.Moore
- Elaphoglossum lawyerae Mickel
- Elaphoglossum laxepaleaceum Rosenst.
- Elaphoglossum laxisquama Mickel
- Elaphoglossum lechlerianum (Mett.) T.Moore
- Elaphoglossum leebrowniae Mickel
- Elaphoglossum lehmannianum Christ
- Elaphoglossum lellingeri Mickel
- Elaphoglossum lenticulatum A.Rojas
- Elaphoglossum leonardii Mickel
- Elaphoglossum lepervanchii T.Moore
- Elaphoglossum lepidothrix Mickel
- Elaphoglossum lepidotum J.Sm.
- Elaphoglossum leporinum L.D.Gómez
- Elaphoglossum leprosum Christ
- Elaphoglossum leptophlebium (Baker) C.Chr.
- Elaphoglossum lessonii (Mett.) C.Chr.
- Elaphoglossum leucolepis (Baker) Krajina ex Tardieu
- Elaphoglossum liaisianum (Glaz. ex Fée) Brade
- Elaphoglossum lindbergii Rosenst.
- Elaphoglossum lindenii (Bory) T.Moore
- Elaphoglossum lindigii (H.Karst.) T.Moore
- Elaphoglossum lingua (C.Presl) Brack.
- Elaphoglossum lisboae Rosenst.
- Elaphoglossum litanum C.Chr.
- Elaphoglossum lloense (Hook.) T.Moore
- Elaphoglossum lonchophyllum (Fée) T.Moore
- Elaphoglossum longicaudatum Mickel
- Elaphoglossum longicrure Christ
- Elaphoglossum longifolium (Jacq.) J.Sm.
- Elaphoglossum longipilosum (Atehortúa ex Mickel) A.Rojas
- Elaphoglossum longissimum C.Chr.
- Elaphoglossum longistipitatum A.Rojas
- Elaphoglossum longius Mickel
- Elaphoglossum loreae Mickel
- Elaphoglossum lorentzii Christ
- Elaphoglossum lucens A.Rojas
- Elaphoglossum luridum Christ
- Elaphoglossum luteum A.Rojas
- Elaphoglossum luteynii Mickel
- Elaphoglossum luzonicum Copel.

== M ==
- Elaphoglossum macahense (Fée) Rosenst.
- Elaphoglossum macdougalii A.Rojas
- Elaphoglossum macilentum Mickel
- Elaphoglossum macrophyllum Christ
- Elaphoglossum macropodium T.Moore
- Elaphoglossum macrostandleyi A.Rojas
- Elaphoglossum maculatum Mickel
- Elaphoglossum madidiense M.Kessler & Mickel
- Elaphoglossum maguirei Mickel
- Elaphoglossum malayense Holttum
- Elaphoglossum manantlanense Mickel
- Elaphoglossum mandonii Christ
- Elaphoglossum marginale Christ
- Elaphoglossum marginatum T.Moore
- Elaphoglossum maritzae A.Rojas
- Elaphoglossum marojejyense Tardieu
- Elaphoglossum marquisearum Bonap.
- Elaphoglossum martinezianum A.Rojas
- Elaphoglossum martinicense T.Moore
- Elaphoglossum mathewsii (Fée) T.Moore
- Elaphoglossum maxonii Underw. ex C.V.Morton
- Elaphoglossum maya N.T.L.Pena
- Elaphoglossum mcvaughii Mickel
- Elaphoglossum megalurum Mickel
- Elaphoglossum melancholicum Vareschi
- Elaphoglossum melanochlamys Holttum
- Elaphoglossum melanostictum (Blume) T.Moore
- Elaphoglossum meridense (Klotzsch) T.Moore
- Elaphoglossum mesoamericanum A.Rojas
- Elaphoglossum metallicum Mickel
- Elaphoglossum mettenii Christ
- Elaphoglossum mexicanum (E.Fourn.) A.Rojas
- Elaphoglossum meyeri Rouhan
- Elaphoglossum mickelianum A.Rojas
- Elaphoglossum mickeliorum F.B.Matos & R.C.Moran
- Elaphoglossum micradenium (Fée) T.Moore
- Elaphoglossum micropogon Mickel
- Elaphoglossum microproductum A.Rojas
- Elaphoglossum miersii C.Chr.
- Elaphoglossum mildbraedii Hieron.
- Elaphoglossum milnei Krajina
- Elaphoglossum miniatum Christ
- Elaphoglossum minutissimum R.C.Moran & Mickel
- Elaphoglossum minutum (Pohl ex Fée) T.Moore
- Elaphoglossum mitorrhizum Mickel
- Elaphoglossum molle C.Chr.
- Elaphoglossum monicae Mickel
- Elaphoglossum montanum Kieling-Rubio & P.G.Windisch
- Elaphoglossum montgomeryi Mickel
- Elaphoglossum moorei Christ
- Elaphoglossum moralesii A.Rojas
- Elaphoglossum moranii Mickel
- Elaphoglossum moritzianum T.Moore
- Elaphoglossum mourae Brade
- Elaphoglossum moyeri Mickel
- Elaphoglossum mulleri C.Chr.
- Elaphoglossum muriculatum C.Chr.
- Elaphoglossum murinum M.Kessler & Mickel
- Elaphoglossum murkelense M.Kato
- Elaphoglossum muscosum (Sw.) T.Moore
- Elaphoglossum nanoglossum Mickel

== N–O ==
- Elaphoglossum nanum A.Rojas
- Elaphoglossum nanuzae Novelino
- Elaphoglossum nastukiae Mickel
- Elaphoglossum neeanum A.Rojas
- Elaphoglossum neei M.Kessler & Mickel
- Elaphoglossum negrosensis Holttum
- Elaphoglossum nematorhizon Maxon
- Elaphoglossum nervosum (Bory) Christ
- Elaphoglossum nesioticum Holttum
- Elaphoglossum nicaraguense A.Rojas
- Elaphoglossum nidiformis Mickel
- Elaphoglossum nidusoides Rouhan & Rakotondr.
- Elaphoglossum nigrescens (Hook.) Diels
- Elaphoglossum nigripes Holttum
- Elaphoglossum nigrocostatum Mickel
- Elaphoglossum nigrosquama A.Rojas
- Elaphoglossum nilgiricum Krajina ex Sledge
- Elaphoglossum nimbaense J.P.Roux
- Elaphoglossum nivosum (Kunze) Mickel
- Elaphoglossum norrisii Bedd.
- Elaphoglossum notatum (Fée) T.Moore
- Elaphoglossum novogranatense A.Vasco
- Elaphoglossum novoguineense Rosenst.
- Elaphoglossum oblanceolatum C.Chr.
- Elaphoglossum obovatum Mickel
- Elaphoglossum obscurum C.Chr.
- Elaphoglossum obtusatum (Carm) C.Chr.
- Elaphoglossum obtusum Mickel
- Elaphoglossum ocoense C.Chr.
- Elaphoglossum oculatum Mickel
- Elaphoglossum odontolepis Mickel
- Elaphoglossum oleandropsis C.Chr.
- Elaphoglossum ometepense L.D.Gómez
- Elaphoglossum omissum Mickel
- Elaphoglossum oophyllum Mickel
- Elaphoglossum opacum Hieron.
- Elaphoglossum ophioglossoides (Goldm.) Holttum
- Elaphoglossum orbignyanum (Fée) T.Moore
- Elaphoglossum oreophilum A.Vasco
- Elaphoglossum organense Brade
- Elaphoglossum ornatiforme Mickel
- Elaphoglossum ornatum Christ
- Elaphoglossum ornithoglossum Mickel
- Elaphoglossum orosiense A.Rojas
- Elaphoglossum ortegae Mickel
- Elaphoglossum ovalauense Krajina
- Elaphoglossum ovalilimbatum Bonap.
- Elaphoglossum ovatum (Hook. & Grev.) T.Moore
- Elaphoglossum oxyglossum Mickel

== P ==
- Elaphoglossum pachydermum (Fée) T.Moore
- Elaphoglossum pachyphyllum (Kunze) C.Chr.
- Elaphoglossum pachyrrhizum Mickel
- Elaphoglossum pala Andre
- Elaphoglossum paleaceum (Hook. & Grev.) Sledge
- Elaphoglossum pallescens Holttum
- Elaphoglossum pallidum (Baker) C.Chr.
- Elaphoglossum palmarum M.Kessler & Mickel
- Elaphoglossum palmeri Underw. & Maxon
- Elaphoglossum palorense Rosenst.
- Elaphoglossum panamense A.Rojas
- Elaphoglossum pangoanum C.Chr.
- Elaphoglossum pannosum M.Kessler & Mickel
- Elaphoglossum papillosum Christ
- Elaphoglossum papyraceum (Fée) F.B.Matos & R.C.Moran
- Elaphoglossum paramicola A.Rojas
- Elaphoglossum pardalinum Mickel
- Elaphoglossum parduei Mickel
- Elaphoglossum parvisquameum Skottsb.
- Elaphoglossum parvulum Mickel
- Elaphoglossum pascoense R.M.Tryon
- Elaphoglossum patini Christ
- Elaphoglossum pattersoniae Mickel
- Elaphoglossum paucinervium M.Kessler & Mickel
- Elaphoglossum paulistanum Rosenst.
- Elaphoglossum paultonii Mickel
- Elaphoglossum pellucidomarginatum (Christ) C.Chr.
- Elaphoglossum pellucidum C.Chr.
- Elaphoglossum peltatum (Sw.) Urb.
- Elaphoglossum pendulum A.Rojas
- Elaphoglossum perelegans (Fée) T.Moore
- Elaphoglossum perrierianum C.Chr.
- Elaphoglossum petiolatum Urb.
- Elaphoglossum petiolosum (Desv.) T.Moore
- Elaphoglossum phanerophlebium C.Chr.
- Elaphoglossum phoras Mickel
- Elaphoglossum phyllitidis Mickel
- Elaphoglossum picardae Hieron.
- Elaphoglossum piloselloides T.Moore
- Elaphoglossum pilosius Mickel
- Elaphoglossum planicosta Holttum
- Elaphoglossum pleurothallioides Novelino
- Elaphoglossum plicatum C.Chr.
- Elaphoglossum plumieri T.Moore
- Elaphoglossum plumosum (Fée) T.Moore
- Elaphoglossum poeppigianum T.Moore
- Elaphoglossum polyblepharum Mickel
- Elaphoglossum polypodium A.Rojas
- Elaphoglossum polytrichum Christ
- Elaphoglossum poolii (Baker) Christ
- Elaphoglossum porteri Hicken
- Elaphoglossum potomogeton Mickel
- Elaphoglossum potosianum Christ
- Elaphoglossum praetermissum Mickel
- Elaphoglossum praetrepidans M.Kessler
- Elaphoglossum pringlei C.Chr.
- Elaphoglossum procurrens (Mett.) T.Moore
- Elaphoglossum productum Rosenst.
- Elaphoglossum proliferans Maxon & C.V.Morton
- Elaphoglossum propinquum Christ
- Elaphoglossum proximum (J.Bommer) Christ
- Elaphoglossum pruinosum C.Chr.
- Elaphoglossum pseudoboryanum Mickel
- Elaphoglossum pseudodidynamum Hieron.
- Elaphoglossum pseudoerinaceum A.Rojas
- Elaphoglossum pseudoherminieri A.Rojas
- Elaphoglossum pseudovillosum Bonap.
- Elaphoglossum pteropodum C.Chr.
- Elaphoglossum pteropus C.Chr.
- Elaphoglossum pulchrum M.Kessler & Mickel
- Elaphoglossum pullenii Holttum
- Elaphoglossum pumilio Mickel
- Elaphoglossum pumilum H.J.Lam & Verhey
- Elaphoglossum punae Mickel
- Elaphoglossum pusillum (Mett.) C.Chr.
- Elaphoglossum pygmaeum (Mett.) Christ

== Q–R ==
- Elaphoglossum queenslandicum S.B.Andrews
- Elaphoglossum quisqueyanum A.Vasco
- Elaphoglossum quitense C.Chr.
- Elaphoglossum ramosissimum T.Moore
- Elaphoglossum randii Alston & Schelpe
- Elaphoglossum rapense Copel.
- Elaphoglossum raywaense (Jenman) Alston
- Elaphoglossum recommutatum Holttum
- Elaphoglossum reductum A.Rojas
- Elaphoglossum repens Copel.
- Elaphoglossum resiniferum Holttum
- Elaphoglossum resinosum A.Rojas
- Elaphoglossum × revaughanii Lorence
- Elaphoglossum revolutum (Liebm.) T.Moore
- Elaphoglossum rheophilum M.Kato, Darnaedi & K.Iwats.
- Elaphoglossum rhodesianum Schelpe
- Elaphoglossum rhomboideum A.Vasco, Mickel & R.C.Moran
- Elaphoglossum richardii (Bory) Christ
- Elaphoglossum rimbachii Christ
- Elaphoglossum riparium Brade
- Elaphoglossum rivularum J.P.Roux
- Elaphoglossum robinsonii Holttum
- Elaphoglossum rojasii N.T.L.Pena
- Elaphoglossum rosenstockii Christ
- Elaphoglossum rosettum R.C.Moran & Mickel
- Elaphoglossum rosillense Urb.
- Elaphoglossum rubellum Mickel
- Elaphoglossum rubescens Christ
- Elaphoglossum rubicundum (Pohl ex Ettingsh.) Alston
- Elaphoglossum rufescens (Liebm.) T.Moore
- Elaphoglossum ruficomus Mickel
- Elaphoglossum rufidulum (Willd.) C.Chr.
- Elaphoglossum rufum Mickel
- Elaphoglossum rupestre (H.Karst.) Christ
- Elaphoglossum rupicola C.Chr.
- Elaphoglossum russelliae Mickel
- Elaphoglossum rwandense Pic.Serm.
- Elaphoglossum rzedowskii Mickel

== S ==
- Elaphoglossum samoense Brack.
- Elaphoglossum sartorii (Liebm.) Mickel
- Elaphoglossum savaiense (Baker) Diels
- Elaphoglossum scandens T.Moore
- Elaphoglossum schizolepis (Baker) Christ
- Elaphoglossum schwackeanum Brade
- Elaphoglossum sclerophyllum Alderw.
- Elaphoglossum scolopendrifolium (Raddi) J.Sm.
- Elaphoglossum scolopendriforme Tardieu
- Elaphoglossum sehnemii Brade
- Elaphoglossum sellowianum (C.Presl) T.Moore
- Elaphoglossum seminudum Mickel
- Elaphoglossum semisubulatum R.C.Moran & Mickel
- Elaphoglossum serpens Maxon & C.V.Morton
- Elaphoglossum × setaceum Lorence
- Elaphoglossum setigerum Diels
- Elaphoglossum setosum T.Moore
- Elaphoglossum sieberi (Hook. & Grev.) T.Moore
- Elaphoglossum silencioanum A.Rojas
- Elaphoglossum siliquoides (Jenman) C.Chr.
- Elaphoglossum simplex (Sw.) Schott
- Elaphoglossum simulans Mickel
- Elaphoglossum sinii C.Chr.
- Elaphoglossum skottsbergii Krajina
- Elaphoglossum skutchianum A.Rojas
- Elaphoglossum smithii Christ
- Elaphoglossum sodiroi Christ
- Elaphoglossum solomonii A.Rojas
- Elaphoglossum sordidum Christ
- Elaphoglossum spatulatum (Bory) T.Moore
- Elaphoglossum spectabile C.Chr.
- Elaphoglossum splendens Brack.
- Elaphoglossum sporadolepis (Kunze) T.Moore
- Elaphoglossum sprucei Diels
- Elaphoglossum squamipes (Hook.) T.Moore
- Elaphoglossum squamocostatum A.Rojas
- Elaphoglossum squarrosum (Klotzsch) T.Moore
- Elaphoglossum standleyi Mickel
- Elaphoglossum stelligerum (Wall. ex Baker) T.Moore ex Salomon
- Elaphoglossum stenoglossum Mickel
- Elaphoglossum stenolepis P.Bell ex Holttum
- Elaphoglossum stenophyllum Diels
- Elaphoglossum stergiosii Mickel
- Elaphoglossum steyermarkii Mickel
- Elaphoglossum stigmatolepis (Fée) T.Moore
- Elaphoglossum stipitatum (Bory) T.Moore
- Elaphoglossum styriacum Mickel
- Elaphoglossum subandinum C.Chr.
- Elaphoglossum subarborescens Rosenst.
- Elaphoglossum subciliatum Rosenst.
- Elaphoglossum subcinnamomeum Hieron.
- Elaphoglossum subcochleare Christ
- Elaphoglossum subnudum C.Chr.
- Elaphoglossum subsessile (Baker) C.Chr.
- Elaphoglossum succisifolium (Thouars) T.Moore
- Elaphoglossum succubus Mickel
- Elaphoglossum sumatranum Holttum
- Elaphoglossum sunduei M.Kessler & Mickel

== T ==
- Elaphoglossum tabanense André
- Elaphoglossum tachirense Mickel
- Elaphoglossum talamancanum A.Rojas
- Elaphoglossum tamandarei Brade
- Elaphoglossum tambillense (Hook.) T.Moore
- Elaphoglossum tanganjicense Krajina ex Pic.Serm.
- Elaphoglossum tantalinum Mickel
- Elaphoglossum tarbacense A.Rojas
- Elaphoglossum tectum (Willd.) T.Moore
- Elaphoglossum tejeroanum A.Rojas
- Elaphoglossum tenax Rosenst.
- Elaphoglossum tenue Mickel
- Elaphoglossum tenuiculum T.Moore
- Elaphoglossum tenuifolium (Liebm.) T.Moore
- Elaphoglossum terrestre A.Rojas
- Elaphoglossum thamnopteris Holttum
- Elaphoglossum tolimense Christ
- Elaphoglossum tomentellum Mickel
- Elaphoglossum tomentosum (Bory) Christ
- Elaphoglossum tonduzii Christ
- Elaphoglossum tosaense (Yatabe) Makino
- Elaphoglossum tovarense T.Moore
- Elaphoglossum tovii E.Brown
- Elaphoglossum trianae Christ
- Elaphoglossum trichophorum C.Chr.
- Elaphoglossum tripartitum (Hook. & Grev.) Mickel
- Elaphoglossum trivittatum (Sodiro) Christ
- Elaphoglossum truncicola (H.Karst.) Hieron.
- Elaphoglossum tuerckheimii Brause

== U–Z ==
- Elaphoglossum ulei Christ
- Elaphoglossum unduaviense Rosenst.
- Elaphoglossum urbani C.Chr.
- Elaphoglossum urophyllum Mickel
- Elaphoglossum vagans (Mett.) Hieron.
- Elaphoglossum valdespinoi Mickel
- Elaphoglossum vanderwerffii Mickel
- Elaphoglossum vareschianum Mickel
- Elaphoglossum variolatum Mickel
- Elaphoglossum velongum Mickel
- Elaphoglossum vepriferum Holttum
- Elaphoglossum vestitum (Schltdl. & Cham.) Schott
- Elaphoglossum vieillardii (Mett.) T.Moore
- Elaphoglossum viride C.Chr.
- Elaphoglossum viscidum (Fée) Christ
- Elaphoglossum vittarioides Mickel
- Elaphoglossum vohimavense Tardieu
- Elaphoglossum vulcanicum Christ
- Elaphoglossum wageneri T.Moore
- Elaphoglossum wardiae Mickel
- Elaphoglossum wawrae (Luerss.) C.Chr.
- Elaphoglossum welwitschii (Baker) C.Chr.
- Elaphoglossum wettsteinii Christ
- Elaphoglossum williamsiorum Mickel
- Elaphoglossum wrightii (Mett.) T.Moore
- Elaphoglossum wurdackii Vareschi
- Elaphoglossum xanthoneuron (Kunze) T.Moore
- Elaphoglossum xanthopodum Mickel
- Elaphoglossum xiphiophorum Mickel
- Elaphoglossum yatesii Christ
- Elaphoglossum yoshinagae (Yatabe) Makino
- Elaphoglossum yourkeorum Mickel
- Elaphoglossum yungense de la Sota
- Elaphoglossum zakamenense Tardieu
- Elaphoglossum zambesiacum Schelpe
- Elaphoglossum zavalae A.Rojas
- Elaphoglossum zebrinum Mickel
- Elaphoglossum zettleri Vareschi
- Elaphoglossum zosteriformis Mickel
