= Flora of South Georgia =

List of plants native to the Southern Atlantic island of South Georgia

This is a list of the flora of South Georgia, an island in the subantarctic Atlantic Ocean, part of the British overseas territory of South Georgia and the South Sandwich Islands. There are 26 native plant species, and there has been 76 species of introduced plants recorded on the island.

Introduced species tend to be located in the areas of human settlement, such as the former sealing and whaling stations.

Spore producing plants
| | Common name |
|---|---|
| Blechnum penna-marina | Antarctic hard-fern or small fern |
| Cystopteris fragilis | Brittle bladder-fern or common fragile fern |
| Notogrammitis crassior | Strap fern |
| Hymenophyllum falklandicum | Filmy fern |
| Lycopodium magellanicum | Magellanic clubmoss |
| Ophioglossum crotalophoroides | Adder's tongue |
| Polystichum mohrioides | Shield-fern |

Seed plants
| Latin name | Common name |
|---|---|
| Acaena magellanica | Greater burnet |
| Acaena magellanica × tenera | Hybrid burnet |
| Acaena tenera | Lesser burnet |
| Alopecurus magellanicus | Antarctic foxtail |
| Callitriche antarctica | Antarctic starwort |
| Colobanthus quitensis | Antarctic pearlwort |
| Colobanthus subulatus | Lesser pearlwort or sessile pearlwort or emerald bog |
| Deschampsia antarctica | Antarctic hair-grass |
| Festuca contracta | Tufted fescue |
| Galium antarcticum | Antarctic bedstraw |
| Juncus inconspicuous | Lesser rush |
| Juncus scheuchzerioides | Greater native rush |
| Montia fontana | Water blinks |
| Phleum alpinum | Alpine cats-tail |
| Poa flabellata | Tussac grass |
| Ranunculus biternatus | Antarctic buttercup |
| Rostkovia magellanica | Brown (or short) rush |
| Uncinia macrolepis | Smith's sedge |

== Introduced species ==
Introduced species - Considered locally present
| Latin name | Common name |
|---|---|
| Achillea millefolium | Yarrow |
| Achillea ptarmica | Sneezewort |
| Agrostis capillaris | Common bent |
| Agrostis vinealis | Brown bent |
| Anthoxanthum odoratum | Sweet vernal grass |
| Anthriscus sylvestris | Cow parsley |
| Capsella bursa-pastoris | Shephard's purse |
| Cardamine glacialis | Bittercress |
| Carex aquatilis | Water sedge |
| Carex nigra | Common sedge |
| Carex vallis-pulchrae | Marsh sedge |
| Cerastium fontanum | Common mouse-eared chickweed |
| Dactylis glomerata | Cocksfoot |
| Deschampsia cespitosa | Tufted hair-grass |
| Deschampsia flexuosa | Wavy hair-grass |
| Deschampsia parvula | Punkgrass |
| Elymus repens | Couch grass |
| Empetrum rubrum | Diddle-dee |
| Festuca rubra | Red fescue |
| Hypericum sp. | St. John's wort |
| Juncus filiformis | Thread rush |
| Leptinella scariosa | Feathery buttonweed |
| Lobelia pratiana | Berry lobelia |
| Luzula multiflora | Heath wood-rush |
| Nardus stricta | Mat grass |
| Poa annua | Annual meadow grass |
| Poa pratensis | Smooth meadow grass |
| Poa trivialis | Rough meadow grass |
| Ranunculus acris | Meadow buttercup |
| Ranunculus repens | Creeping buttercup |
| Rumex acetosella | Sheep's sorrel |
| Rumex crispus | Curled dock |
| Sagina procumbens | Procumbent pearlwort |
| Stellaria media | Common chickweed |
| Taraxacum officinale | Dandelion |
| Trifolium repens | White clover |
| Tripleurospermum inodorum | Scentless mayweed |
| Trisetum spicatum | Spikey trisetum |
| Vaccinium vitis-idaea | Cowberry |
| Veronica serpyllifolia | Thyme-leaved speedwell |

Introduced species - Considered locally extinct
| Latin name | Common name | Year last seen | Location |
|---|---|---|---|
| Aegilops sp. | Goat grass | 1961 | Grytviken |
| Alchemilla monticola | Velvet lady's mantle | 1992 | Husvik |
| Allium schoenoprasum | Chives | 2015 | Leith |
| Alopecurus magellanicus | Marsh foxtail | 1968 | Grytviken |
| Artemisia sp | Mugwort | 1967 | Grytviken |
| Avena fatua | Wild-oat | 1961 | Grytviken |
| Brassica cf. napus | Rape | 1961 | Grytviken |
| Carum carvi | Caraway | 1968 | Grytviken |
| Centella sp. | Centella | 1967 | Grytviken |
| Cerastium arvense | Field mouse-ear | 1970 | Grytviken |
| Daucus carota | Carrot | 1967 | Grytviken |
| Festuca ovina | Sheep's fescue | 1981 | Husvik |
| Festuca perennis | Italian rye-grass | 1961 | Grytviken |
| Hypericum tetrapterum | Square-stemmed St. John's wort | 2005 | Husvik |
| Lactuca sp. | Wild lettuce | 1971 | Grytviken |
| Lamium purpureum | Red dead-nettle | 1969 | King Edward Point |
| Lolium temulentum | Darnel rye-grass | 1961 | Leith |
| Lotus corniculatus | Bird's foot trefoil | 1992 | Husvik |
| Lupinus sp. | Lupin | 1961 | Leith |
| Matricaria discoidea | Pineapple weed | 1979 | King Edward Point |
| Phleum pratense | Timothy grass | 1961 | Husvik |
| Pisum sativum | Pea | 1961 | King Edward point |
| Plantago sp. | Hoary plantain | 1967 | Grytviken |
| Raphanus sp. | Radish | 1968 | Grytviken |
| Rorippa islandica | Northern yellow-cress | 1971 | Grytviken |
| Rumex alpinus | Alpine dock | 1961 | Leith |
| Senecio vulgaris | Common groundsel | 1967 | King Edward Point |
| Sinapis arvensis | Charlock | 1979 | King Edward Point |
| Solanum tuberosum | Potato | 1967 | Grytviken |
| Sonchus sp. | Sow thistle | 1979 | King Edward Point |
| Stellaria graminea | Grass leaf-starwort | 1964 | Husvik |
| Thlaspi arvense | Field penny-cress | 1961 | Husvik |
| Trifolium hybridum | Alsike clover | 1980 | Leith |
| Urtica dioica | Common nettle | 1967 | Leith |
| Urtica urens | Annual nettle | 1961 | Grytviken |
