= Pleurotomella papyracea =

Scientific classification
- Kingdom: Animalia
- Phylum: Mollusca
- Class: Gastropoda
- Subclass: Caenogastropoda
- Order: Neogastropoda
- Superfamily: Conoidea
- Family: Raphitomidae
- Genus: Pleurotomella
- Species: P. papyracea

Binomial name
- Pleurotomella papyracea (Watson, 1881)

Synonyms
- Pleurotoma (Thesbia) papyracea Watson, 1881 (original combination)

Species of gastropod

Pleurotomella papyracea is a species of sea snail, a marine gastropod mollusk in the family Raphitomidae.

== Description ==
The length of the shell attains 26.4 mm, its diameter 13.2 mm.

(Original description) The white shell is thin, like delicate tissue-paper and bluntly keeled, subplicate. It has a small, high, sharp, scalar spire, an angulated suture, a short tumid body whorl narrowing from the carina, suddenly contracted on the base, and prolonged into a largish triangular one-sided snout.

Sculpture. Longitudinals – there are extremely fine hairlike lines of growth. There are also oblique, rounded, narrow foldings of the surface, which below the sinus area rise into 14 small, narrow, sparse ridges or elongated tubercles and extend to the base. On the earlier whorls these rise into small threadlike ribs which reach the inferior suture. Spirals – the almost membranaceous sinus-area forms a sloping shoulder below the suture, and occupies about one third of the whorl. Below this is the keel, on which the little tubercles rise. From this keel downwards the surface is covered with minute, unequal, but rather regular, though somewhat interrupted, sparse threads with broader intervals. Besides this there is a microscopic, obsolete, spiral granulation which extends to the sinus-area.

The colour is alabaster-white, so far as the excessive thinness permits. The small spiral threads are somewhat dead white. The embryonic whorls are of a rich ruddy-orange tint.

The spire is perfectly conical, scalar, high, sharp. The protoconch consists of 3½ ruddy, smooth, embryonic whorls, which are globose. They are divided by an impressed suture, and rise to a small, blunt, round top, in the middle of which the extreme tip just barely rises into sight. The shell contains 8½ whorls in all, of slow, but increasingly rapid enlargement. Those of the spire are rather narrow and high, and have a high flat shoulder, a sharp angulated keel, and a very slight contraction from this point to the inferior suture. The body whorl is tumid, but short, with a sloping shoulder, a much blunter angulation, a marked contraction from this point, a very blunt angulation defining the base, which contracts a good deal and suddenly, and which on the right side is prolonged into the conical, triangular-shaped, blunt- though small- pointed snout. The suture is linear and almost invisible, but well defined by the angulation at which the whorls meet, and also by the change of colour where the inferior whorl laps up on the one above it, which produces a pseudo-margination. The aperture is large and irregularly semicircular, angulated above, and ending in a distinct open siphonal canal below. The outer lip is excessively thin, slightly patulous below, but not at all above. It leaves the body at a right angle, and advances across the sinus-area in a perfectly straight line. It is angulated at the keel, from which point it curves very regularly, till towards the edge of the siphonal canal it becomes concave and finally straight. Round the front of the siphonal canal it is not in the least patulous. Its edge forms a semicircular curve with a high shoulder, between which and the body lies the large, broad, open, rounded sinus. The inner lip, which, though very narrow, is continued to the point of the columella, is cut into the substance of the shell, and is defined by a slight raised margin beyond it. The line across the body is very short, and joins the columella at a very obtuse angle. The columella is very long and straight, and is cut off in front with a very gradually oblique, thin, twisted edge.

== Distribution ==
This marine species has been found between the Kerguelens and Prince Edward Islands.
