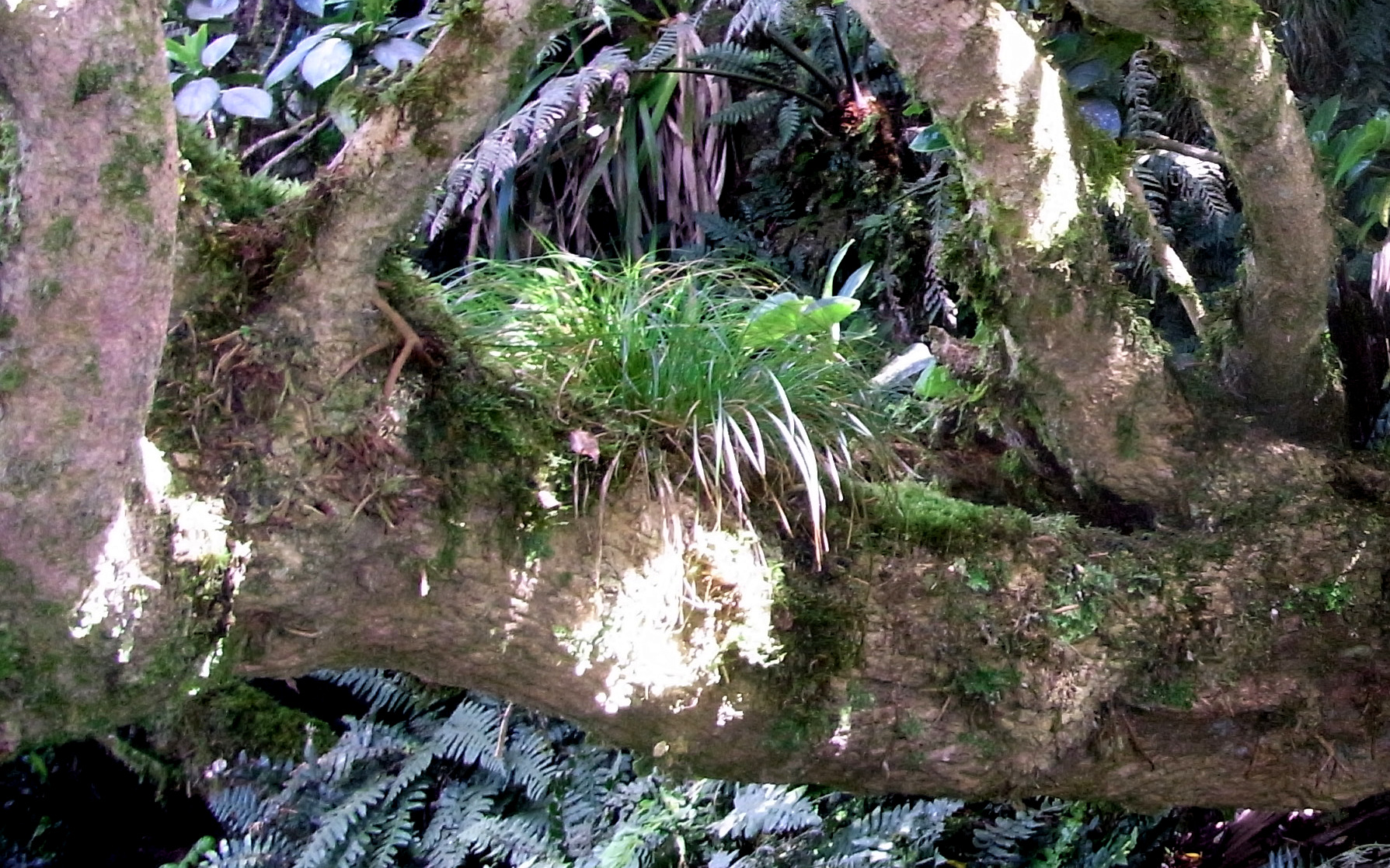
- Mount Gower

Scientific classification
- Kingdom: Plantae
- Clade: Tracheophytes
- Clade: Angiosperms
- Clade: Monocots
- Clade: Commelinids
- Order: Poales
- Family: Cyperaceae
- Genus: Carex
- Species: C. debilior

Binomial name
- Carex debilior (F.Muell.) K.L.Wilson

Synonyms
- Uncinia debilior F.Muell.; Uncinia filiformis var. debilior (F.Muell.) W.R.B.Oliv.; Carex debilior

= Carex debilior =

Species of grass-like plant

Carex debilior is a species of flowering plant in the sedge family Cyperaceae. The specific epithet derives from the Latin debilis ("weak" or "feeble"), with reference to the species having weaker culms than Carex austrocompacta.

== Description ==
It is a tufted perennial, with filiform culms, growing to 15–50 cm in height. The grasslike leaves are 5–10 cm longer than the culms and 0.5–1 mm wide. The slender inflorescence is 4–7 cm long, with the lowermost 20–30 flowers female, and the uppermost 5–10 male.

== Distribution and habitat ==
The sedge is endemic to Australia's subtropical Lord Howe Island in the Tasman Sea. It occurs in low forest on and around the summits of Mount Lidgbird and Mount Gower at the southern end of the island.
