= Elaphoglossum randii =

Scientific classification
- Kingdom: Plantae
- Clade: Tracheophytes
- Division: Polypodiophyta
- Class: Polypodiopsida
- Order: Polypodiales
- Suborder: Polypodiineae
- Family: Dryopteridaceae
- Genus: Elaphoglossum
- Species: E. randii

Binomial name
- Elaphoglossum randii Alston & Schelpe

Species of fern

Elaphoglossum randii is a species of fern that grows only on the sub-Antarctic islands of Kerguelen and the Marion and Prince Edward Islands in the Indian Ocean.
