= Elaphoglossum hirtum =

Scientific classification
- Kingdom: Plantae
- Clade: Tracheophytes
- Division: Polypodiophyta
- Class: Polypodiopsida
- Order: Polypodiales
- Suborder: Polypodiineae
- Family: Dryopteridaceae
- Genus: Elaphoglossum
- Species: E. hirtum

Binomial name
- Elaphoglossum hirtum (Sw.) C.Chr.

Species of plant

Elaphoglossum hirtum is a species of fern in the Dryopteridaceae family. It is native to some islands in the Caribbean.
