= Prince Edward Islands =

Two small subantarctic islands belonging to South Africa

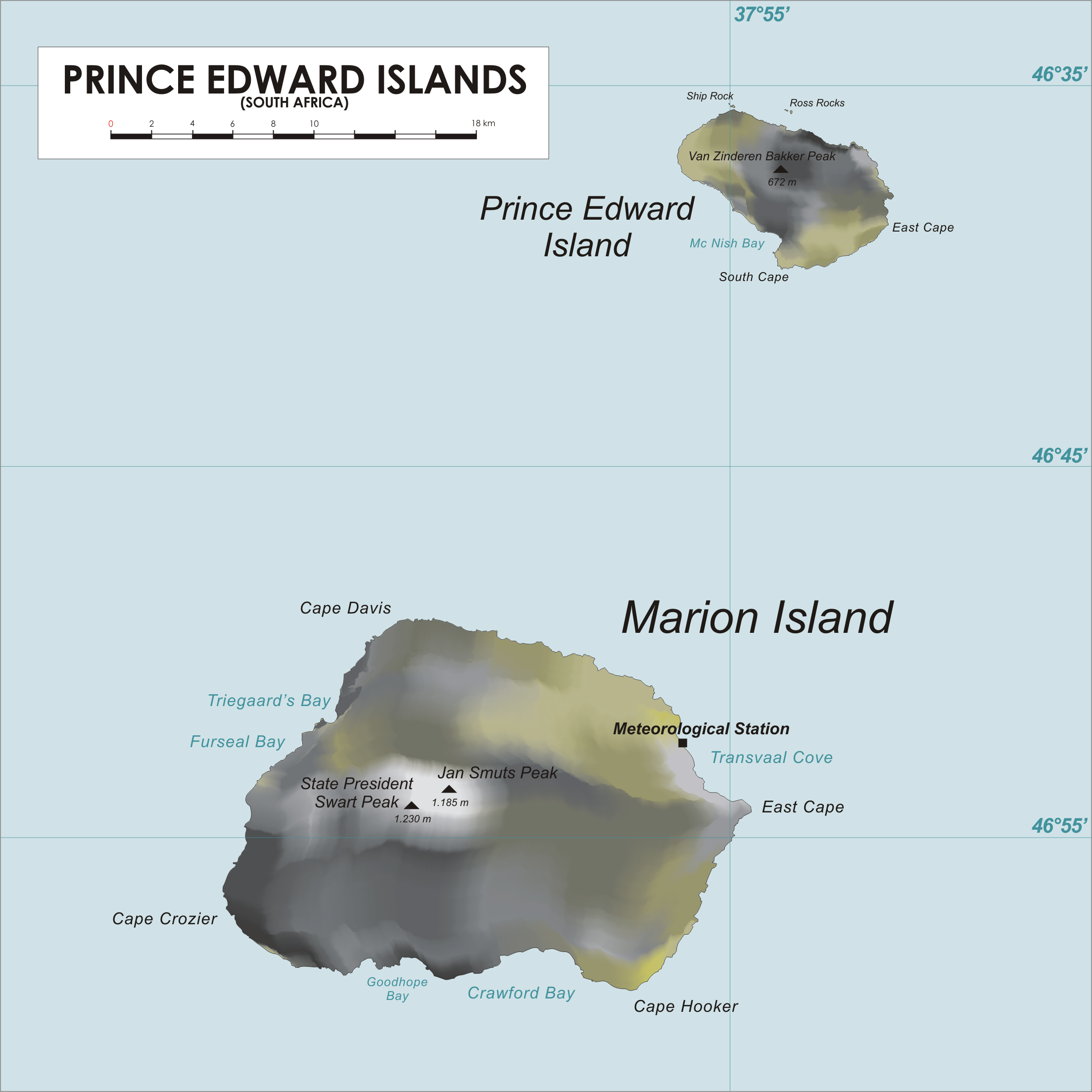
- Map of Prince Edward Islands

- Orthographic projection centred on the Prince Edward Islands

Geography
- Location: Indian Ocean
- Coordinates: 46°52′48″S 37°45′00″E
- Area: 343 km^{2} (132 sq mi)
- Highest elevation: 1,230 m (4040 ft)
- Highest point: Mascarin Peak

Administration
- South Africa
- Province: Western Cape
- Municipality: City of Cape Town

Demographics
- Population: 0 (permanent); 50 (non-permanent research staff)

Designations

Ramsar Wetland
- Designated: 24 January 1997
- Reference no.: 1688

Prince Edward Islands Marine Protected Area

The Prince Edward Islands are two small uninhabited subantarctic volcanic islands in the southern Indian Ocean that are administered by South Africa. They are named Marion Island (named after Marc-Joseph Marion du Fresne, 1724–1772) and Prince Edward Island (named after Prince Edward, Duke of Kent and Strathearn, 1767–1820).

The islands in the group have been declared Special Nature Reserves under the South African Environmental Management: Protected Areas Act, No. 57 of 2003, and activities on the islands are therefore restricted to research and conservation management. Further protection was granted when the area was declared a marine protected area in 2013. The only human inhabitants of the islands are the staff of a meteorological and biological research station run by the South African National Antarctic Programme on Marion Island.

== History ==
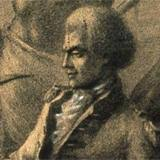
Marc-Joseph Marion du Fresne, as imagined by Charles Meryon

Barent Barentszoon Lam of the Dutch East India Company reached the islands on 4 March 1663 on the ship Maerseveen. They were named Dina (Prince Edward) and Maerseveen (Marion), but the islands were erroneously recorded to be at 41° South, and neither were found again by subsequent Dutch sailors.

In January 1772, the French frigate Le Mascarin, captained by Marc-Joseph Marion du Fresne, visited the islands and spent five days trying to land, thinking they had found Antarctica (then not yet proven to exist). Marion named the islands Terre de l'Espérance (Marion) and Ile de la Caverne (Prince Edward). After failing to land, Le Mascarin continued eastward, discovering the Crozet Islands and landing at New Zealand, where Marion du Fresne and some of his crew were killed by local Māori.

Julien Crozet, navigator and second in command of Le Mascarin, survived the disaster, and happened to meet James Cook at Cape Town in 1776, at the onset of Cook's third voyage. Crozet shared the charts of his ill-fated expedition, and as Cook sailed from Cape Town, he passed the islands on 13 December, but was unable to attempt a landing due to bad weather. Cook named the islands after Prince Edward, the fourth son of King George III; and though he is also often credited with naming the larger island Marion, after Captain Marion, this name was adopted by sealers and whalers who later hunted the area, to distinguish the two islands.

The first recorded landing on the islands was in 1799 by a group of French seal hunters of the Sally. Another landing in late 1803 by a group of seal hunters led by American captain Henry Fanning of the Catharine found signs of earlier human occupation. The islands were frequented by sealers until about 1810, when the local fur seal populations had been nearly eradicated. The first scientific expedition to the islands was led by James Clark Ross, who visited in 1840 during his exploration of the Antarctic, but was unable to land. Ross sailed along the islands on 21 April 1840. He made observations on vast numbers of penguins ("groups of many thousands each"), and other kinds of sea-birds. He also saw fur seals, which he supposed to be of the species Arctocephalus falklandicus. The islands were finally surveyed during the Challenger Expedition, led by Captain George Nares, in 1873.

The sealing era lasted from 1799 to 1913. During that period, visits by 103 vessels are recorded, seven of which ended in shipwreck. Sealing relics include iron trypots, the ruins of huts and inscriptions. The occasional modern sealing vessel visited from Cape Town, South Africa, in the 1920s.

The islands have been the location of other shipwrecks. In June 1849, the brig Richard Dart, with a troop of Royal Engineers under Lt. James Liddell, was wrecked on Prince Edward Island; only 10 of the 63 on board survived to be rescued by elephant seal hunters from Cape Town. In 1908, the Norwegian vessel Solglimt was shipwrecked on Marion Island, and survivors established a short-lived village at the north coast, before being rescued. The wreck of the Solglimt is the best-known in the islands, and is accessible to divers.

The British government never officially claimed ownership of the islands; however it did manage economic activities on the islands in the early 20th century. In 1908, the British government granted a guano lease on Marion Island. Following the Second World War, technological advancements made the islands more strategically important, and as no further economic activity was taking place, the UK was concerned other countries might claim the islands. In late 1947 and early 1948, South Africa, with Britain's agreement, annexed the islands and installed the meteorological station on Transvaal Cove on the north-east coast of Marion Island.

On 22 September 1979, a United States surveillance satellite known as Vela 6911 noted an unidentified double flash of light, known as the Vela incident, in the waters off the islands. There was and continues to be considerable controversy over whether this event was perhaps an undeclared nuclear test carried out by South Africa and Israel or some other event. The cause of the flash remains officially unknown, and some information about the event remains classified. Today, most independent researchers believe that the 1979 flash was caused by a nuclear explosion.

In 2003, the South African government declared the Prince Edward Islands a Special Nature Reserve, and in 2013 it declared 180,000 km^{2} (69,000 sq mi) of ocean waters around the islands a Marine Protection Area, thus creating one of the world's largest environmental protection areas.

=== Marion Research Station ===
Marion Island Base
- Antarctic base
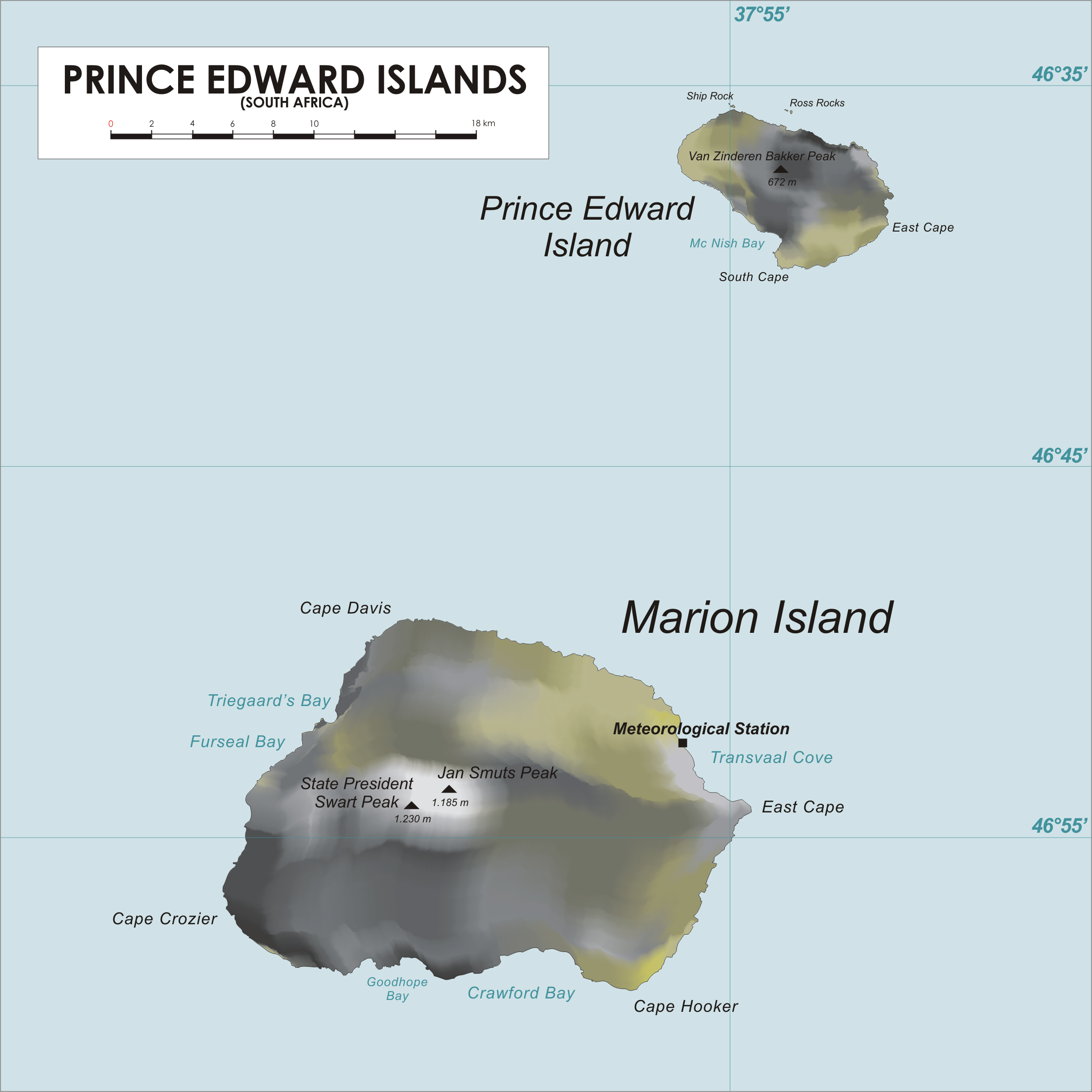
- Location in Prince Edward Islands
- Coordinates: 46°52′32″S 37°51′31″E
- Country: South Africa
- Operator: SANAP
- Established: 1948
- Elevation: 22 m (72 ft)

Population
  - Summer: 18
  - Winter: 18
- Time zone: UTC+3
- UN/LOCODE: ZA
- Active times: All year-round
- Status: Operational
- Activities: List: Meteorology; Biology
- Website: sanap.ac.za

On 4 January 1948 Marion Island and neighbouring Prince Edward Island were officially annexed into South Africa. A group of 14 sailors stayed on the island until 16 days later a permanent occupying force was left there, soon building a meteorological station. The 1948 research station on Marion Island was soon enlarged and today studies regional meteorology and the biology of the islands, in particular the birds (penguins, petrels, albatrosses, gulls) and seals.

A new research base was built from 2001 to 2011 to replace older buildings on the site. The access to the station is either by boat or helicopter. A helipad and storage hangar is located behind the main base structure.

In April 2017, scientists from McGill University, in collaboration with the South African National Antarctic Programme, launched a new astrophysical experiment on Marion Island called Probing Radio Intensity at high-Z from Marion (PRIZM), searching for signatures of the hydrogen line in the early universe. In 2018, another cosmology experiment was launched by the McGill team called Array of Long Baseline Antennas for Taking Radio Observation from Sub-Antarctic (ALBATROS). The new experiment aims to create very high-resolution maps of the low-frequency radio emission from the universe, and take first steps towards detecting the cosmological Dark Ages.

In April 2024, the South African National Antarctic Programme station on Marion Island was depicted in an ad for KFC South Africa directed by Kim Geldenhuys, called "Beyond the Sea", which depicted two South Africans trying to get back to the mainland for fried chicken.

== Geography and geology ==
The island group is about 955 nmi (1,769 km; 1,099 mi) south-east of Port Elizabeth in mainland South Africa. At 46 degrees latitude, it is just over halfway between the equator and the South Pole. Marion Island (46°54′45″S 37°44′37″E), the larger of the two, is 25.03 km (15.55 mi) long and 16.65 km (10.35 mi) wide with an area of 297 km^{2} (115 sq mi) and a coastline of some 72 km (45 mi), most of which is high cliffs. The highest point on Marion Island is Mascarin Peak (formerly State President Swart Peak), reaching 1,242 m (4,075 ft) above sea level. The topography of Marion Island includes many hillocks and small lakes, and boggy lowland terrain with little vegetation.

Prince Edward Island (46°38′39″S 37°56′36″E) is much smaller—only 46 km^{2} (18 sq mi), 10.23 km (6.36 mi) long and 6.57 km (4.08 mi) wide—and lies some 12 nmi (22.2 km; 13.8 mi) to the north-east of Marion Island. The terrain is generally rocky, with high cliffs (490 m (1,608 ft)) on its south western side. At the van Zinderen Bakker Peak north-west of the center, it reaches a height of 672 m (2,205 ft).

There are a few offshore rocks along the northern coast of Prince Edward Island, like Ship Rock 100 m (328 ft) north of northernmost point, and Ross Rocks 500 m (1,640 ft) from the shore. Boot Rock is about 500 m (1,640 ft) off the northern coast of Marion Island.

Both islands are of volcanic origin. Marion Island is one of the peaks of a large underwater shield volcano that rises some 5,000 m (16,404 ft) from the sea floor to the top of Mascarin Peak. The volcano is active, with eruptions having occurred between 1980 and 2004. While Prince Edward Island may have erupted within the last 10 thousand years.

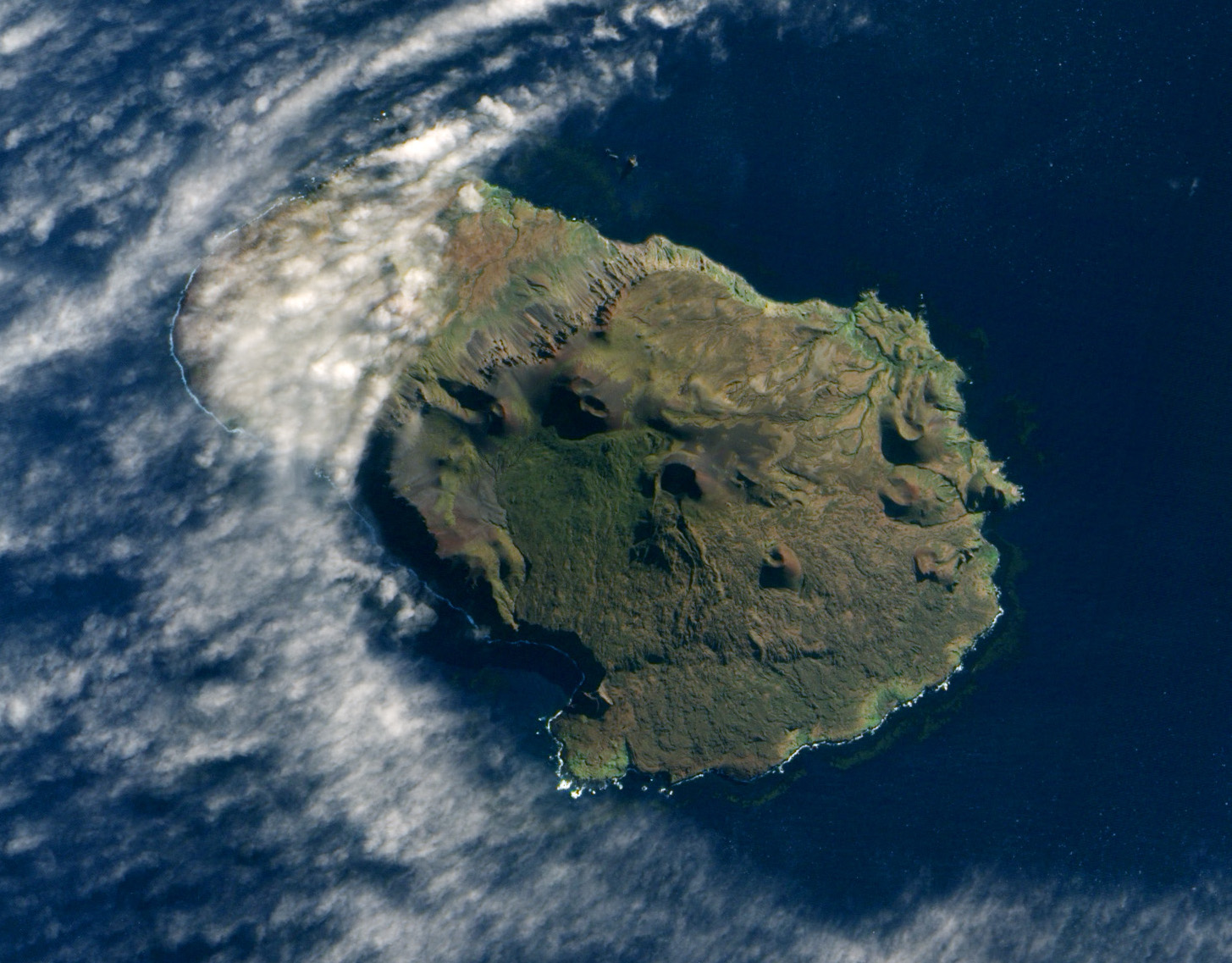
Satellite image of Prince Edward Island, 2009.

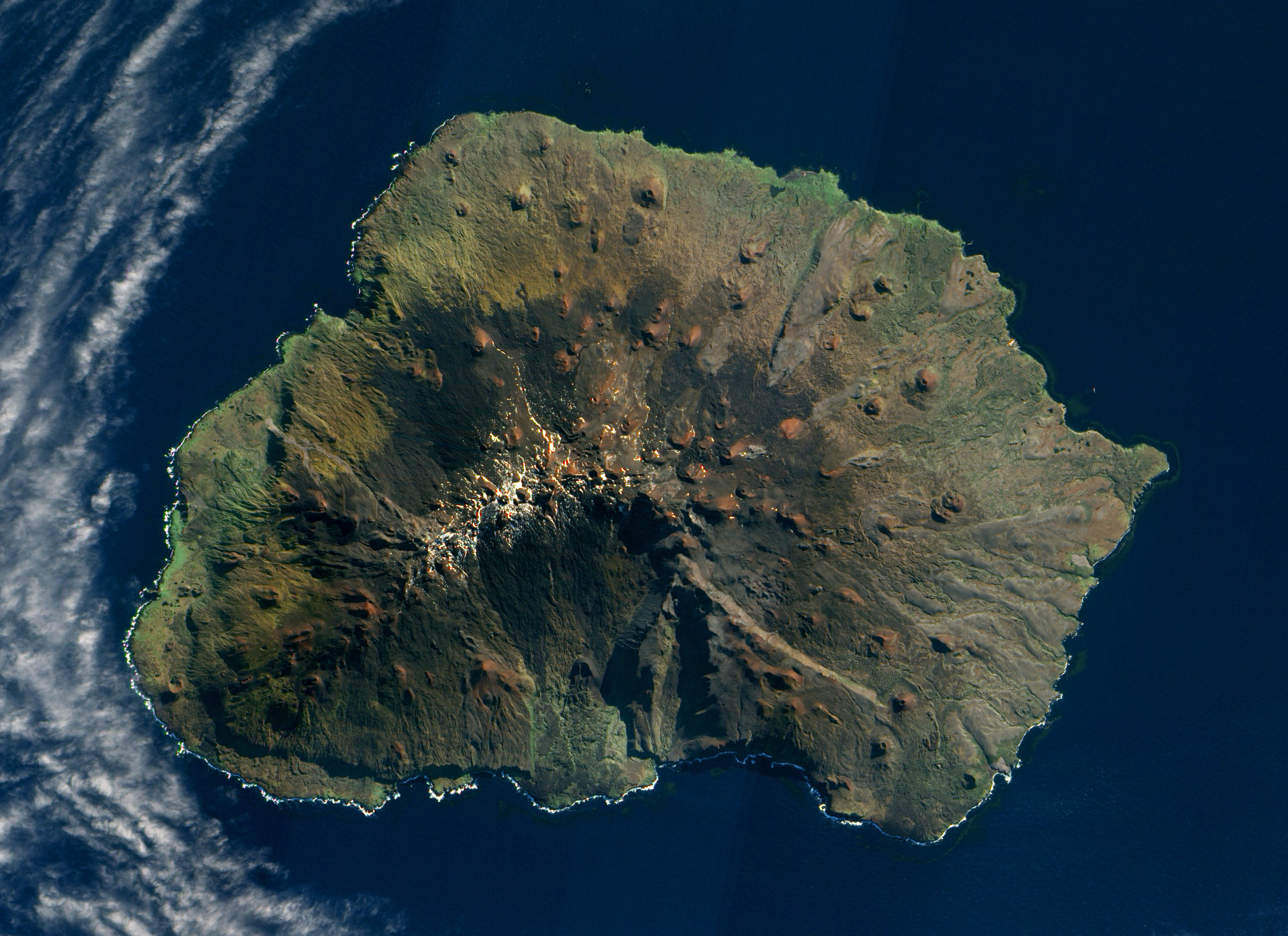
Satellite image of Marion Island, 2009

=== Climate ===
Despite being located inside the south temperate zone at 46 degrees latitude, the islands have a tundra climate. They lie directly in the path of eastward-moving depressions all year round and this gives them an unusually cool and windy climate. Strong regional winds, known as the roaring forties, blow almost every day of the year, and the prevailing wind direction is north-westerly. Annual rainfall averages from 2,400 mm (94.5 in) up to over 3,000 mm (118.1 in) on Mascarin Peak. In spite of its very chilly climate it is located closer to the equator than mild northern hemisphere climates such as Paris and Seattle and only one degree farther south than fellow southern hemisphere climates such as Comodoro Rivadavia in Argentina and Alexandra in New Zealand. Many climates on lower latitudes in the Northern hemisphere have far colder winters than Prince Edward Islands due to the islands' maritime moderation, even though temperatures in summer are much cooler than those normally found in maritime climates.

The islands are among the cloudiest places in the world; about 1300 hours a year of sunshine occur on the sheltered eastern side of Marion Island, but only around 800 hours occur away from the coast on the wet western sides of Marion and Prince Edward Islands.

Summer and winter have fairly similar climates with cold winds and threat of snow or frost at any time of the year. However, the mean temperature in February (midsummer) is 7.7 °C (45.9 °F) and in August (midwinter) it is 3.9 °C (39.0 °F).

Climate data for Marion Island (1991–2020, extremes 1949–present)
Month	Jan	Feb	Mar	Apr	May	Jun	Jul	Aug	Sep	Oct	Nov	Dec	Year
Record high °C (°F)	25.6 (78.1)	22.9 (73.2)	22.2 (72.0)	19.3 (66.7)	18.4 (65.1)	18.2 (64.8)	18.6 (65.5)	16.5 (61.7)	17.0 (62.6)	17.7 (63.9)	19.2 (66.6)	21.9 (71.4)	25.6 (78.1)
Mean daily maximum °C (°F)	11.4 (52.5)	11.9 (53.4)	11.0 (51.8)	9.9 (49.8)	8.6 (47.5)	7.3 (45.1)	7.1 (44.8)	6.8 (44.2)	7.0 (44.6)	8.1 (46.6)	9.3 (48.7)	10.4 (50.7)	9.0 (48.2)
Daily mean °C (°F)	8.3 (46.9)	8.8 (47.8)	8.0 (46.4)	7.2 (45.0)	5.9 (42.6)	4.8 (40.6)	4.5 (40.1)	4.2 (39.6)	4.3 (39.7)	5.3 (41.5)	6.3 (43.3)	7.3 (45.1)	6.2 (43.2)
Mean daily minimum °C (°F)	5.2 (41.4)	5.7 (42.3)	5.2 (41.4)	4.3 (39.7)	3.2 (37.8)	2.2 (36.0)	1.9 (35.4)	1.6 (34.9)	1.6 (34.9)	2.5 (36.5)	3.2 (37.8)	4.2 (39.6)	3.4 (38.1)
Record low °C (°F)	−1.5 (29.3)	−1.4 (29.5)	−2.5 (27.5)	−2.2 (28.0)	−3.0 (26.6)	−6.0 (21.2)	−6.0 (21.2)	−5.5 (22.1)	−6.9 (19.6)	−4.7 (23.5)	−3.9 (25.0)	−1.5 (29.3)	−6.9 (19.6)
Average precipitation mm (inches)	163.6 (6.44)	155.4 (6.12)	160.9 (6.33)	153.3 (6.04)	169.3 (6.67)	162.7 (6.41)	161.9 (6.37)	144.9 (5.70)	155.0 (6.10)	139.7 (5.50)	142.6 (5.61)	158.5 (6.24)	1,857 (73.11)
Average precipitation days (≥ 1.0 mm)	17.9	15.1	17.1	16.0	18.8	19.7	21.0	18.3	18.3	15.9	16.8	17.8	212.6
Average relative humidity (%)	83	84	84	84	85	86	85	84	83	82	82	83	84
Mean monthly sunshine hours	158.9	135.4	125.8	98.3	82.0	59.1	66.9	88.2	106.0	133.6	150.8	164.4	1,311.7
Source 1: NOAA (humidity 1961–1990)
Source 2: Meteo Climat (record highs and lows)

== Flora and fauna ==
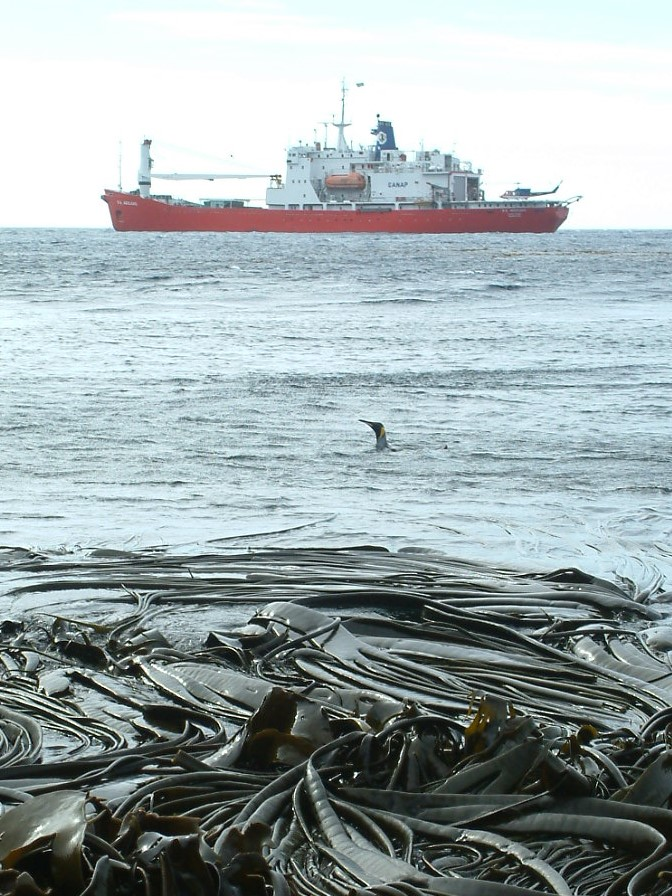
View from Marion island of the South African icebreaker SA Agulhas, with a penguin swimming in the water and kelp on the shore

The islands are part of the Southern Indian Ocean Islands tundra ecoregion that includes a small number of subantarctic islands. Because of the paucity of land masses in the Southern Ocean, the islands host a wide variety of species and are critical to conservation. In the cold subantarctic climate, plants are mainly limited to grasses, mosses, and kelp, while lichens are the most visible fungi. The main indigenous animals are insects (such as the seaweed-eating weevil Palirhoeus eatoni) along with large populations of seabirds, seals and penguins.

=== Birds ===
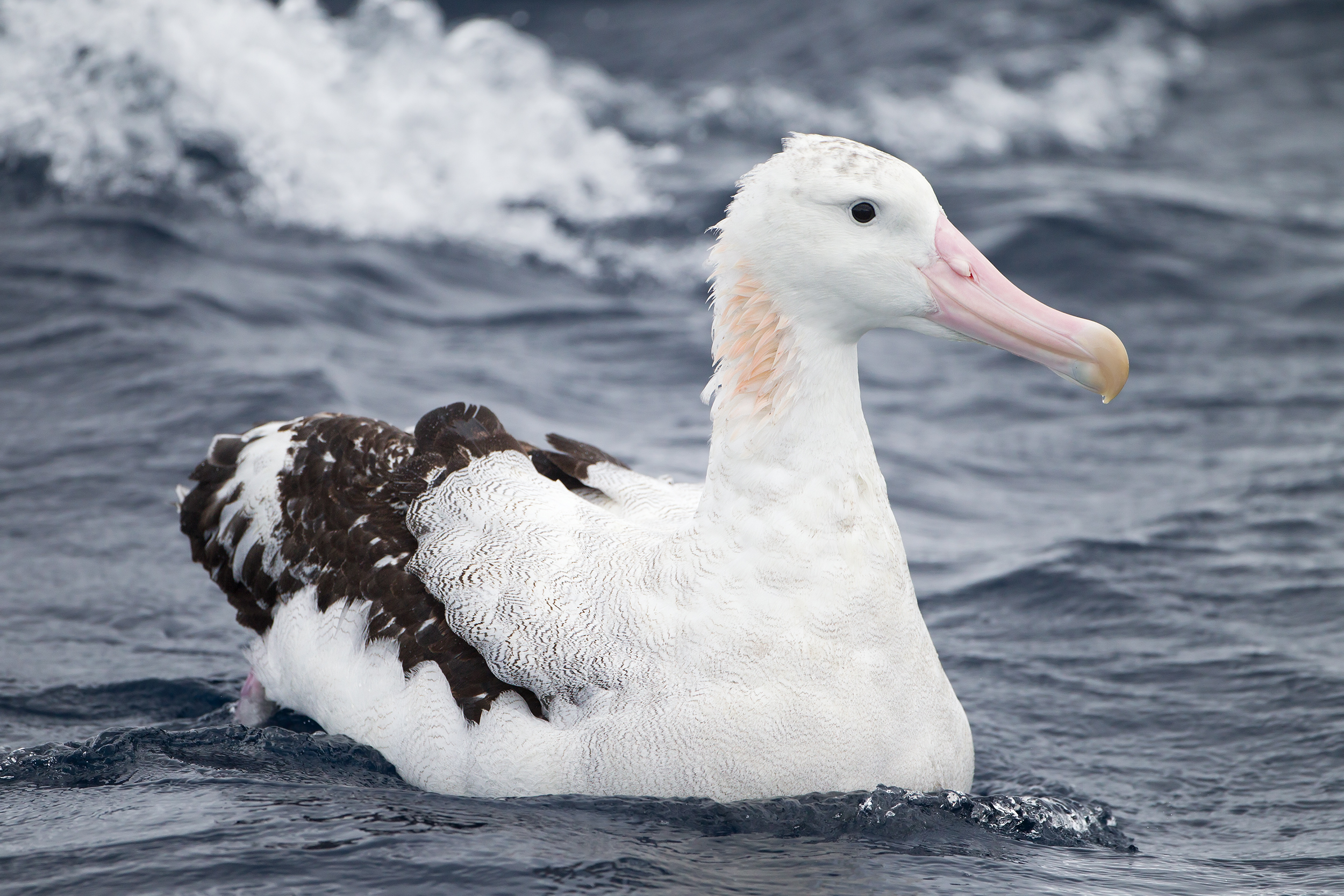
A wandering albatross

The islands have been designated an Important Bird Area (IBA) by BirdLife International for their significant seabird breeding populations. At least thirty different species of birds are thought to breed on the islands, and it is estimated the islands support upwards of 5 million breeding seabirds, and 8 million seabirds total. Five species of albatross (of which all are either threatened or endangered) are known to breed on the islands, including the wandering albatross, dark-mantled, light-mantled, Indian yellow-nosed and grey-headed albatross.

The islands also host fourteen species of petrel, four species of prion, the Antarctic tern, and the brown skua, among other seabirds. Four penguin species are found: king penguins, Eastern rockhoppers, gentoos and macaroni penguins.

=== Mammals ===
Three species of seal breed on the islands: the southern elephant seal, the Antarctic fur seal, and the Subantarctic fur seal. The waters surrounding the islands are often frequented by several species of whale, especially orcas, which prey on penguins and seals. Large whales such as southern rights and southern humpbacks, and leopard seals are seen more sporadically, and it remains unclear how large or stable their current local populations are, though it is thought their numbers are significantly down compared to the time of first human contact with the islands.

The area saw heavy sealing and whaling operations in the nineteenth century and continued to be subject to mass illegal whaling until the 1970s, with the Soviet Union and Japan allegedly continuing whaling operations into the 1990s. Currently, the greatest ecological threat is the longline fishing of Patagonian toothfish, which endangers a number of seabirds that dive into the water after baited hooks.

=== Terrestrial plants ===
Like all subantarctic islands, Marion has a small number of native plant species. The isolation of the island and the cold, wet, windy weather conditions filtered out many potential plants from reaching and successfully establishing populations. Only 22 vascular plants were native to the island prior to human arrival. One of them, Ranunculus moseleyi, a species also found in the Kerguelen Islands, is of uncertain status with no records of it being found since 1969 and no specimens in archives to unambiguously prove its presence prior to that date.

There are seven species of fern and fern allies include Antarctic hard-fern (Austroblechnum penna-marina), alpine filmy-fern (Hymenophyllum peltatum), Magellanic clubmoss (Lycopodium magellanicum), Notogrammitis crassior, Phlegmariurus saururus, Polystichum marionense, and Elaphoglossum randii.

The island has five species of cushion and mat forming flowering plants Azorella selago, Callitriche antarctica, Colobanthus kerguelensis, Crassula moschata, Leptinella plumosa. Other herbaceous plants include Kerguelen cabbage (Pringlea antiscorbutica), Antarctic buttercup (Ranunculus biternatus), Limosella australis, and blinks (Montia fontana).

Several grass-like species grow on Marion including the rush Juncus scheuchzerioides, Cook's tussock-grass (Poa cookii), Polypogon magellanicus. The sedge species Carex dikei is endemic to Marion and Prince Edward Island, but was only scientifically described in 2015. Further research is needed to determine if records of Carex austrocompacta on other subantarctic islands might be this species.

=== Invasive species ===
The wildlife is particularly vulnerable to introduced species and the historical problem has been with cats and mice. House mice arrived to Marion Island with whaling and sealing ships in the 1800s and quickly multiplied, so much so that in 1949, five domestic cats were brought to the research base to deal with them. The cats multiplied quickly, and by 1977 there were approximately 3,400 cats on the island, feeding on burrowing petrels in addition to mice, and taking an estimated 455,000 petrels a year. Some species of petrels soon disappeared from Marion Island, and a cat eradication programme was established. A few cats were intentionally infected with the highly specific feline panleukopenia virus, which reduced the cat population to about 600 by 1982. The remaining cats were killed by nocturnal shooting, and in 1991 only eight cats were trapped in a 12-month period.

It is believed that no cats remain on Marion Island today, and with the cats gone, the mouse population has sharply increased to "plague like" levels. In 2003, ornithologists discovered that in the absence of other food sources, the mice were attacking albatross chicks and eating them alive as they sat helplessly on their nests. A similar problem has been observed on Gough Island, where a mouse eradication programme began in 2021. A programme to eradicate invasive rats on South Georgia Island was completed in 2015, and as of 2016 the island appears to be completely rat free. The geography of Marion Island presents certain obstacles not found on either Gough or South Georgia islands, particularly its large size, high elevations and variable weather. An assessment of the island was completed in May 2015, led by noted invasive species ecologist John Parkes, with the general conclusion that an eradication programme is feasible, but will require precise planning.

Both Gough Island and the Prince Edward Islands also suffer from invasive procumbent pearlwort (Sagina procumbens), which is transforming the upland ecosystem and is now considered beyond control.

== Legal status ==
Logo of Marion Island

Marion Island and Prince Edward Island were claimed for South Africa on 29 December 1947 and 4 January 1948 respectively, by a South African Navy force from HMSAS Transvaal under the command of John Fairbairn. On 1 October 1948 the annexation was made official when Governor-General Gideon Brand van Zyl signed the Prince Edward Islands Act, 1948. In terms of the Act, the islands fall under the jurisdiction of the Cape Town Magistrate's Court, and South African law as applied in the Western Cape applies on them. The islands are also deemed to be situated within the electoral district containing the Port of Cape Town; as of 2016, this is ward 115 of the City of Cape Town.

== Amateur radio ==
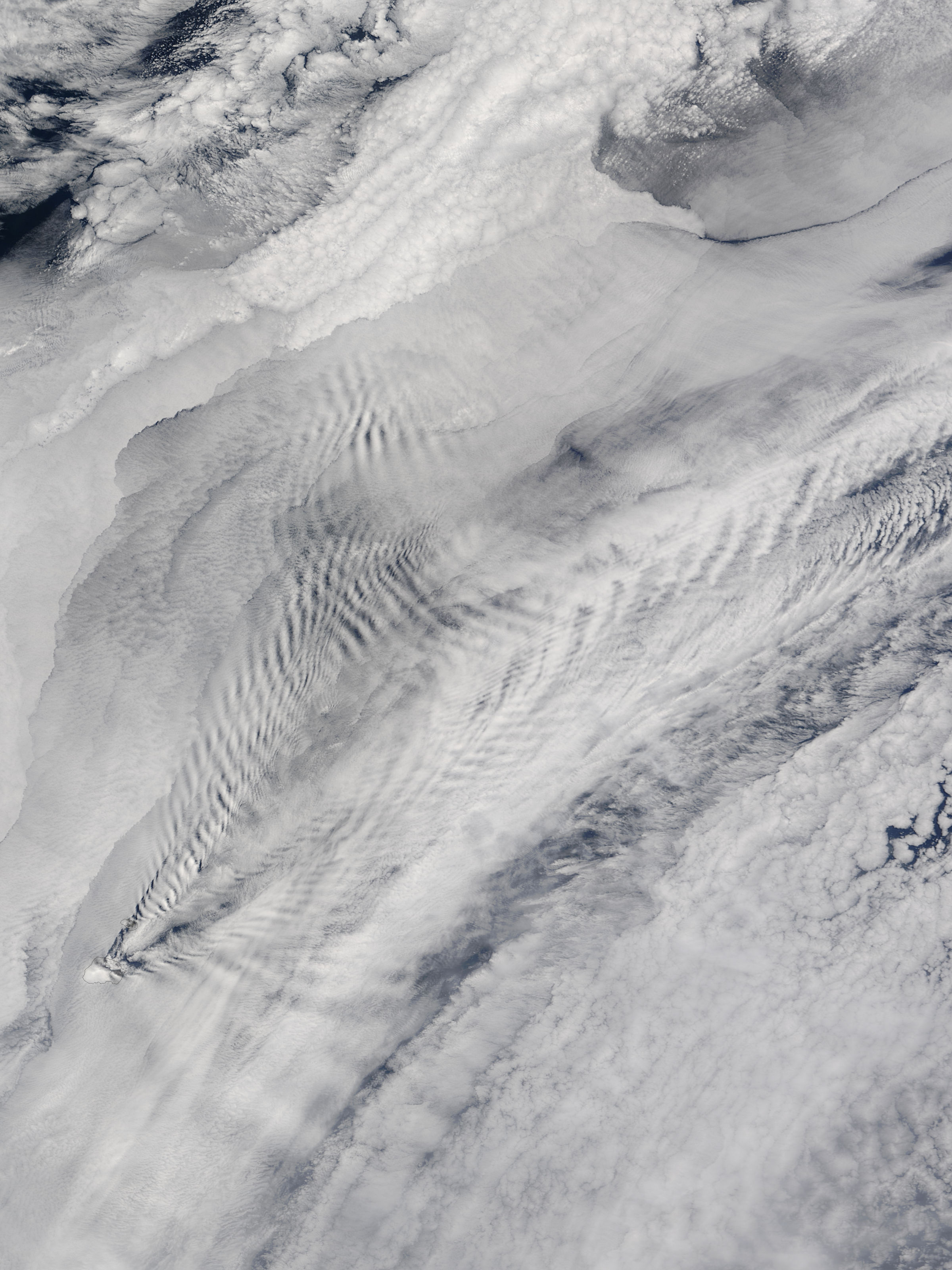
Cloud patterns over the Prince Edward Islands

As of 2014, Marion Island, prefix ZS8, was the third-most wanted DXCC "entity" by the amateur radio community. By the end of 2014, it had dropped to 27th, after simultaneous activity by three licencees in the 2013/2014 team. However, their activity was mainly on voice. On Morse telegraphy, the Islands remain the second-most wanted entity after North Korea, while on data they are sixth out of 340.

== See also ==
- Crozet Islands
- Gough Island
- List of Antarctic islands north of 60° S
- List of protected areas of South Africa
- List of sub-Antarctic islands
- Prince Edward fracture zone
- S. A. Agulhas
- S. A. Agulhas II
- SANAE
- South African National Antarctic Programme
- Vela incident

== General and cited sources ==
- LeMasurier, W. E.; Thomson, J. W., eds. (1990). Volcanoes of the Antarctic Plate and Southern Oceans. American Geophysical Union. ISBN 978-0-87590-172-5.
- "Marion Island". Global Volcanism Program. Smithsonian Institution.
- "Prince Edward Island". Global Volcanism Program. Smithsonian Institution.
- Jenkins, Geoffrey (1979). Southtrap. William Collins, Sons and Co Ltd. ISBN 978-0-00-616116-5.
- Ross, James Clark (1847). A Voyage of Discovery and Research in the Southern and Antarctic Regions . London: John Murray – via Wikisource.
- de Bruyn P.J.N.; Oosthuizen W.C., eds. (2017). "Pain forms the Character: Doc Bester, Cat hunters & Sealers". Antarctic Legacy of South Africa. ISBN 978-0-620-74912-1.
