= Mascarin Peak =

Mountain on Marion Island

- Location within Indian Ocean

Highest point
- Elevation: 1,230 m (4,040 ft)
- Prominence: 1,230 m (4,040 ft)
- Listing: Ribu; List of mountains in South Africa; List of shield volcanoes
- Coordinates: 46°54′S 37°46′E

Geography
- Location: Indian Ocean; Prince Edward Islands, South Africa

Geology
- Rock age: Holocene
- Mountain type: Shield Volcano
- Last eruption: 2004

Mascarin Peak (until 2003 called State President Swart Peak), is the highest mountain on Marion Island, with a height of 1,230 metres (4,040 ft). Marion Island is the largest island of the Prince Edward Islands in the sub-Antarctic Indian Ocean. The islands belong to South Africa and are administered by the South African National Antarctic Programme. Mascarin Peak is ranked 37th by topographic isolation.

Mascarin Peak is South Africa's only active volcano. The last eruption occurred in 2004. Renamed in 2003 after Marion du Fresne's frigate Le Mascarin.

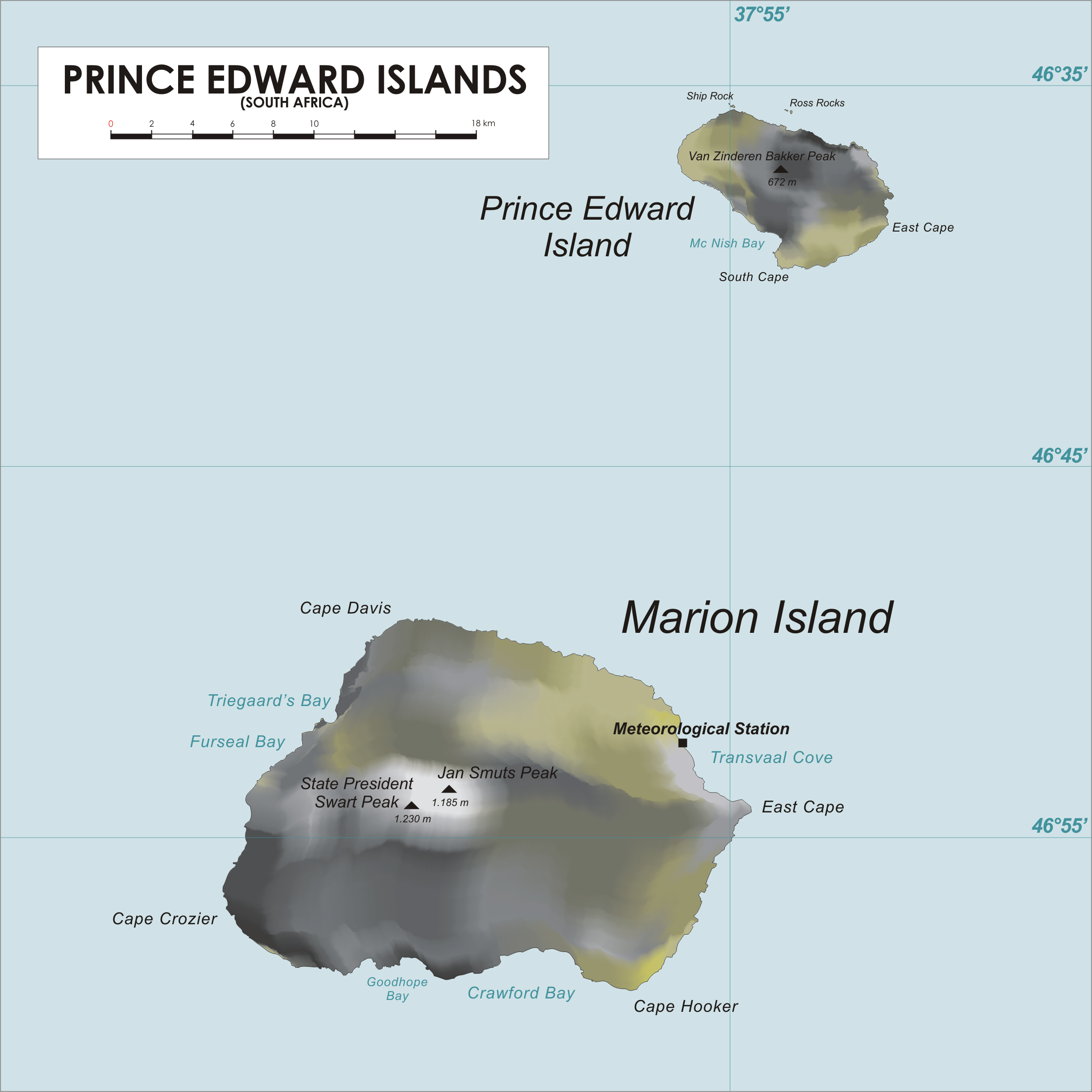
Map of Prince Edward Islands
