= Elaphoglossum nervosum =

Conservation status
- Critically Endangered (IUCN 3.1)

Scientific classification
- Kingdom: Plantae
- Clade: Embryophytes
- Clade: Tracheophytes
- Division: Polypodiophyta
- Class: Polypodiopsida
- Order: Polypodiales
- Suborder: Polypodiineae
- Family: Dryopteridaceae
- Genus: Elaphoglossum
- Species: E. nervosum

Binomial name
- Elaphoglossum nervosum (Bory) Christ

Synonyms
- Aconiopteris nervosa (Bory) J.Sm.; Aconiopteris subdiaphana (Hook. & Grev.) C.Presl; Acrostichum nervosum Bory; Acrostichum subdiaphanum Hook. & Grev.; Olfersia nervosa (Bory) T.Moore; Olfersia subdiaphana (Hook. & Grev.) T.Moore

Species of fern

Elaphoglossum nervosum, the veined tongue-fern, is a species of herbaceous epiphytic plant in the Dryopteridaceae family.

== Description ==
It is a fern with short, scaly, black, sterile leaves approximately 12-25 cm long.

== Distribution ==
The species is endemic to Saint Helena.

== Taxonomy ==
It was first described as Acrostichum nervosum by Jean Baptiste Bory de Saint-Vincent in 1829. In 1899 Konrad Hermann Heinrich Christ placed the species in genus Elaphoglossum as E. nervosum.
