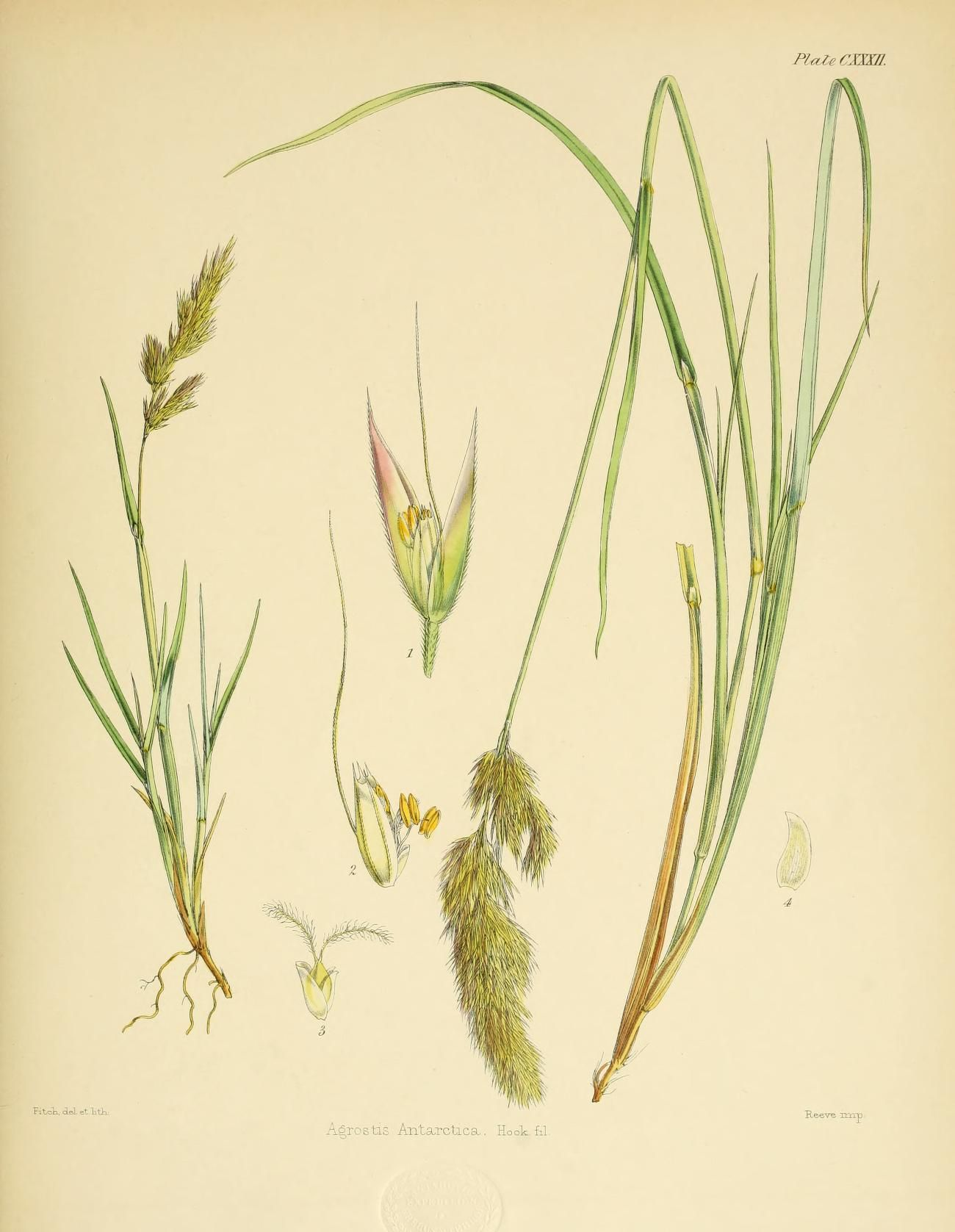

Scientific classification
- Kingdom: Plantae
- Clade: Embryophytes
- Clade: Tracheophytes
- Clade: Spermatophytes
- Clade: Angiosperms
- Clade: Monocots
- Clade: Commelinids
- Order: Poales
- Family: Poaceae
- Subfamily: Pooideae
- Genus: Polypogon
- Species: P. magellanicus

Binomial name
- Polypogon magellanicus (Lam.) Finot

Synonyms
- List: Agrostis magellanica; Agrostis antarctica; Agrostis araucana; Agrostis chonotica; Agrostis cognata; Agrostis macrathera; Agrostis multiculmis; Agrostis rinihuensis; Vilfa magellanica

= Polypogon magellanicus =

Species of grass

Polypogon magellanicus (Syn. Agrostis magellanica) is a species of grass. It has a circumpolar distribution and is native to many subantarctic islands in, and the coasts bordering, the Southern Ocean.

== Description ==
Polypogon magellanicus is a tufted perennial grass, varying in height from 50 to 450 mm and forming short grassland communities. The culms have purple nodes. The leaves are wiry. The panicles are 20–120 mm long, with many shiny, greenish-purple, distinctly awned spikelets.

== Taxonomy ==
Polypogon magellanicus was scientifically described by Jean-Baptiste Lamarck in 1791 and named Agrostis magellanica. The botanist Victor Lionel Finot reclassified it to the genus Polypogon with the name Polypogon magellanicus. It has no accepted subspecies or varieties, but has 12 synonyms. In New Zealand, the name Agrostis magellanica is still preferred.

Table of Synonyms
Name	Year	Rank	Notes
Agrostis magellanica Lam.	1791	species	≡ hom.
Agrostis antarctica Hook.f.	1847	species	= het.
Agrostis araucana Phil.	1896	species	= het.
Agrostis chonotica Phil.	1858	species	= het.
Agrostis cognata Steud.	1854	species	= het.
Agrostis macrathera Phil.	1896	species	= het.
Agrostis magellanica subsp. laeviuscula C.E.Hubb.	1981	subspecies	= het.
Agrostis magellanica var. antarctica (Hook.f.) Franch.	1889	variety	= het.
Agrostis magellanica var. cognata (Steud.) Macloskie	1915	variety	= het.
Agrostis multiculmis Hook.f.	1845	species	= het.
Agrostis rinihuensis Phil.	1896	species	= het.
Vilfa magellanica (Lam.) P.Beauv.	1812	species	≡ hom.
Notes: ≡ homotypic synonym; = heterotypic synonym

== Distribution and habitat ==
The grass is found in the south-west of New Zealand’s South Island and on the Antipodes, Auckland, and Campbell Islands. It is also native to Macquarie Island and the Falkland, Kerguelen, Crozet and Prince Edward Islands, as well as southern South America in Tierra del Fuego. In New Zealand it occupies subalpine and alpine habitats on stony or rocky ground. In the subantarctic islands it grows at lower altitudes in peat and among mosses and cushion plants, or as scattered small plants in fellfield.
