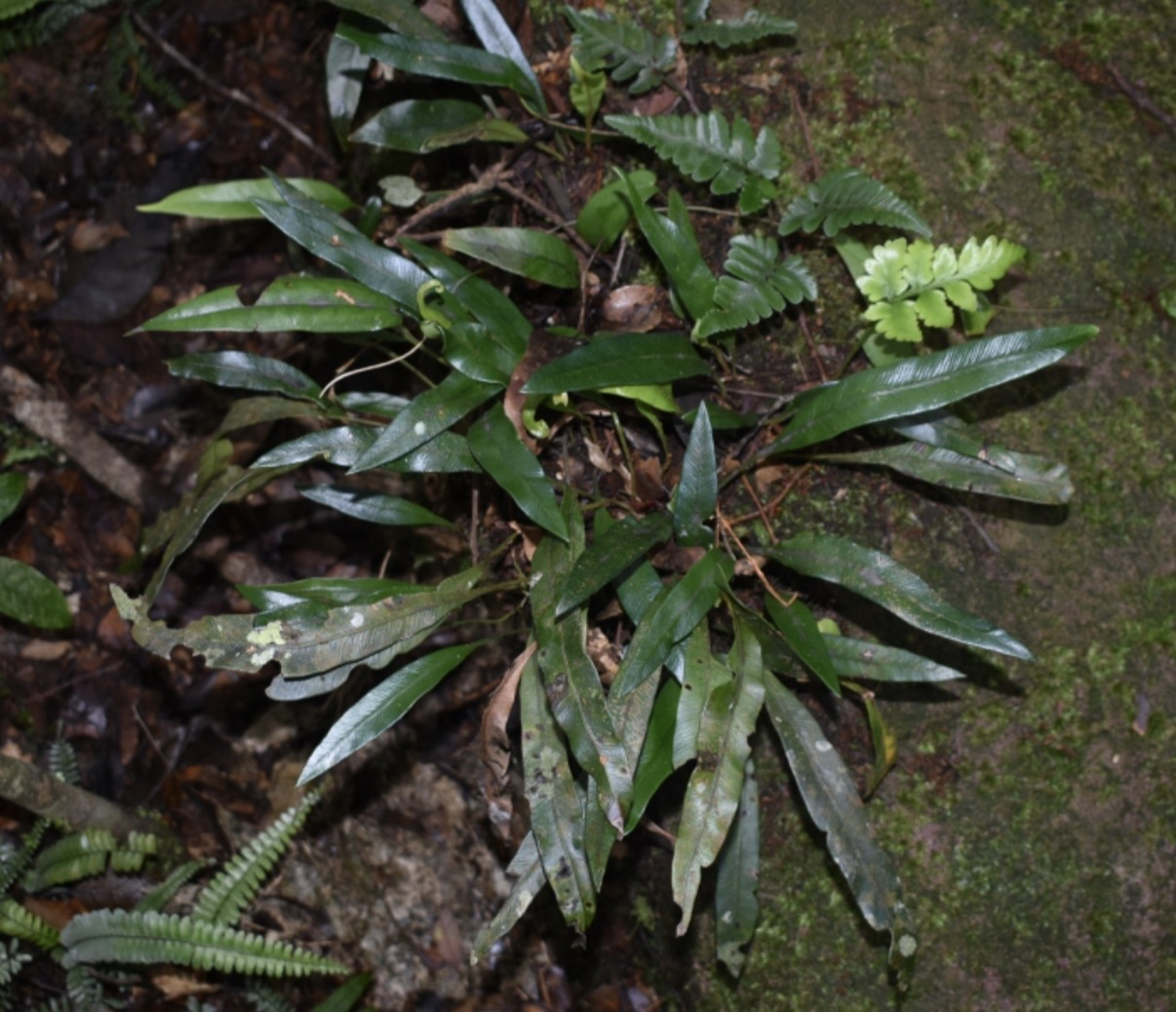

Scientific classification
- Kingdom: Plantae
- Clade: Tracheophytes
- Division: Polypodiophyta
- Class: Polypodiopsida
- Order: Polypodiales
- Suborder: Polypodiineae
- Family: Dryopteridaceae
- Genus: Elaphoglossum
- Species: E. hainanense

Binomial name
- Elaphoglossum hainanense Y.J. Yang, J.P. Shu & Y.H. Yan

= Elaphoglossum hainanense =

Species of fern

Elaphoglossum hainanense is a species of fern in the family Dryopteridaceae endemic to Hainan Island, China.

== Description ==
Elaphoglossum hainanense has long creeping rhizomes that are 3 to 5 millimeters thick and densely covered with scales. The fronds are spaced 3 to 5 millimeters apart along the rhizome. Phyllopodia are present and measure 1 to 2 centimeters in length. The rhizome scales are thin, dark brown, and measure 3 to 5 millimeters long by 1 millimeter wide. Each scale narrows to a hair like tip and has a ciliate margin.

The sterile fronds have a stipe 6 to 8 centimeters long. The lamina is narrowly lanceolate, thin but firm in texture, and measures 11 to 14 centimeters long by 1.5 centimeters wide. The lamina is widest at or below the middle and narrows gradually toward the apex. The apex is acute and the base is narrowly cuneate and decurrent as a narrow wing. A thin cartilaginous edge approximately 0.5 millimeters wide borders the lamina. The lateral veins are raised on the upper surface and distinct and prominent. The upper surface is glabrous and the lower surface has scattered brown stellate trichomidia approximately 0.4 millimeters across. Hydathodes are absent.

The fertile fronds have a stipe 4 to 6 centimeters long. The lamina measures 10 to 12 centimeters long by 1.5 centimeters wide and is similar in shape to the sterile fronds. Intersporangial scales are absent.

Molecular phylogenetic analysis based on chloroplast DNA sequences places E. hainanense within Elaphoglossum sect. Elaphoglossum. The analysis shows that samples of E. hainanense form a distinct clade that is sister to E. acrostichoides. The species is not closely related to E. yunnanense, which belongs to Elaphoglossum sect. Lepidoglossa.

== Etymology ==
The specific epithet hainanense refers to Hainan Province, China, where the species was discovered. The Chinese name for the species is 海南舌蕨 (hǎi nán shé jué).

== Distribution and habitat ==
Elaphoglossum hainanense is endemic to Hainan Island in southern China. It has been recorded from Bawangling and Wuzhishan Mountains, both within the National Park of Hainan Tropical Rainforest. The species grows on rocks and on the trunks of trees in evergreen broad leaved forest at elevations of approximately 1,300 meters.

== Conservation status ==
The species is known from only two locations within the National Park of Hainan Tropical Rainforest and meets Endangered (EN) category criteria under the IUCN Red List categories and criteria B1ab(iii) and D1. It is critically threatened by a small population, fragmented habitat, and high susceptibility to climate change.
