= Elaphoglossum dimorphum =

Conservation status
- Critically Endangered (IUCN 3.1)

Scientific classification
- Kingdom: Plantae
- Clade: Embryophytes
- Clade: Tracheophytes
- Division: Polypodiophyta
- Class: Polypodiopsida
- Order: Polypodiales
- Suborder: Polypodiineae
- Family: Dryopteridaceae
- Genus: Elaphoglossum
- Species: E. dimorphum

Binomial name
- Elaphoglossum dimorphum (Hook. & Grev.) T.Moore

Synonyms
- Acrostichum dimorphum Hook. & Grev.; Anogramma paradoxa Fée; Microstaphyla dimorphum (Hook. & Grev.) J.Sm.; Olfersia dimorpha (Hook. & Grev.) C.Presl

Species of fern

Elaphoglossum dimorphum, the toothed tongue-fern, is a species of herbaceous epiphytic fern in the Dryopteridaceae family.

== Distribution ==
The species is endemic to Saint Helena.

== Taxonomy ==
It was first described as Acrostichum dimorphum by Joseph Dalton Hooker and Robert Kaye Greville in 1829. In 1857 Thomas Moore placed the species in genus Elaphoglossum as E. dimorphum.
