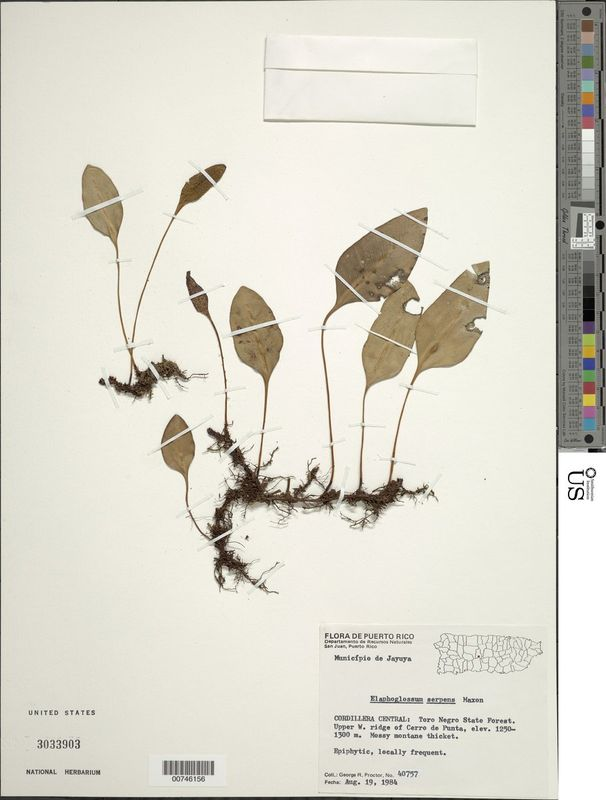

Conservation status
- Endangered (ESA)

Scientific classification
- Kingdom: Plantae
- Clade: Embryophytes
- Clade: Tracheophytes
- Division: Polypodiophyta
- Class: Polypodiopsida
- Order: Polypodiales
- Suborder: Polypodiineae
- Family: Dryopteridaceae
- Genus: Elaphoglossum
- Species: E. serpens

Binomial name
- Elaphoglossum serpens Maxon & Morton ex Maxon

= Elaphoglossum serpens =

Species of fern

Elaphoglossum serpens is a rare species of fern that grows only on Cerro de Punta, the highest mountain in Puerto Rico. The fern grows at one location, where there are 22 known specimens. It was federally listed as an endangered species of the United States in 1993.

The fern was described in 1947 from specimens found at Monte Jayuya. This habitat was cleared for construction and the plant was extirpated. It was later located on Cerro de Punta. This fern is an epiphyte which grows on the trunks of the tree species Lyonia rubiginosa var. stahlii. There are only six trees that together host the 22 ferns. This mountain summit is coveted for its ideal location for communications facilities and construction of these facilities has led to destruction of part of the forest there.

This fern produces a few fronds of two different types. The sterile frond is up to 19 centimeters long with a blade at the end measuring up to 8 centimeters long by 3.5 wide. The fertile frond is up to 18 centimeters long and has a smaller blade, up to 4 centimeters long and only about a centimeter wide.

The fern grows on mossy tree trunks in the elfin forest on the highest peak on the island of Puerto Rico. This cloud forest has a short, dense canopy no more than about 7 meters tall. It is very wet, windy, and has saturated soils poor in nutrients.

Because this plant is known from only one location, habitat destruction or disturbance in that area could result in the extinction of the species. The mountain peak was strongly impacted by Hurricane Hugo in 1989. Many permits have been requested by entities interested in building structures in the area, an activity that has caused plant destruction in the past.
