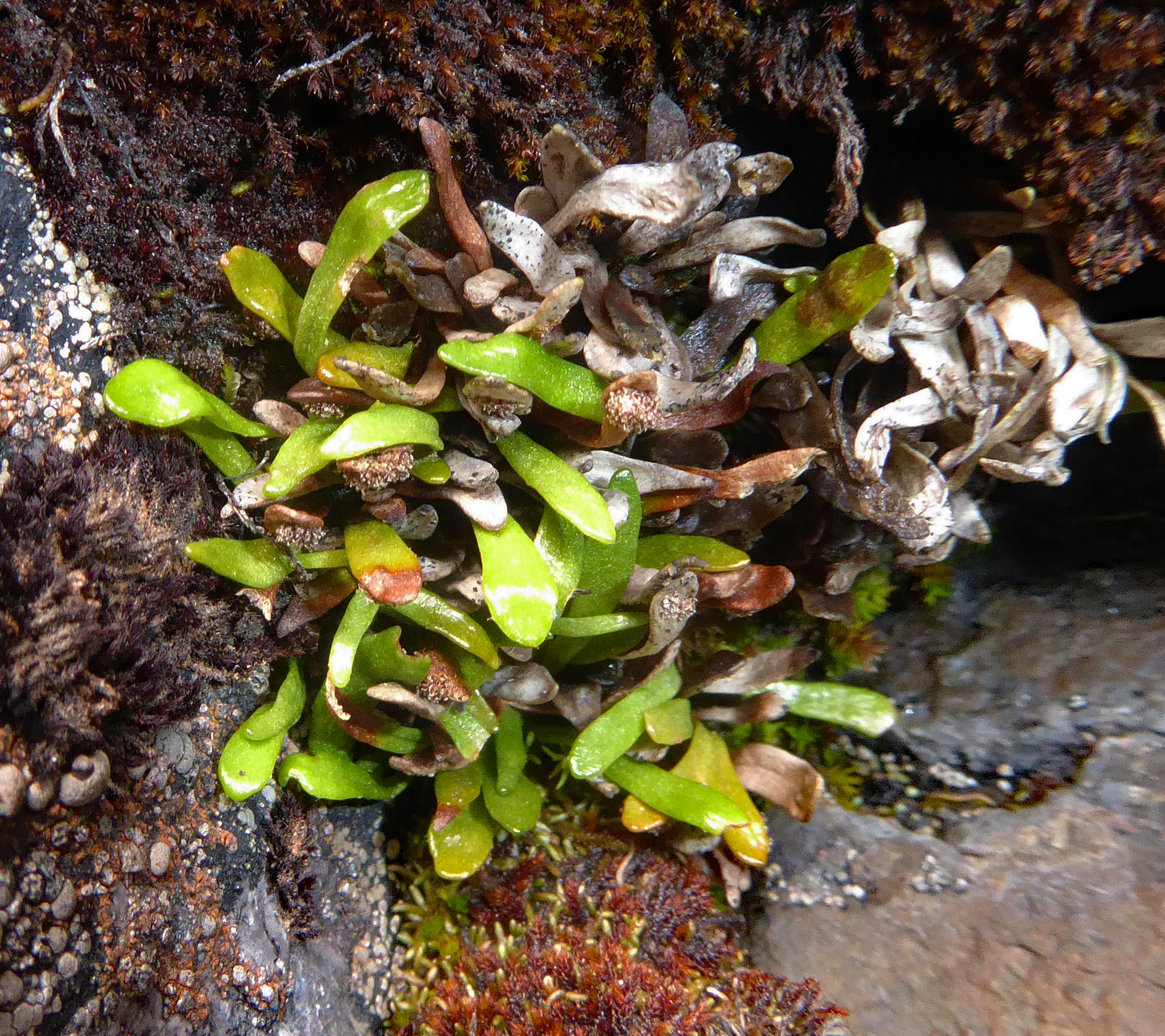

Scientific classification
- Kingdom: Plantae
- Clade: Embryophytes
- Clade: Tracheophytes
- Division: Polypodiophyta
- Class: Polypodiopsida
- Order: Polypodiales
- Suborder: Polypodiineae
- Family: Polypodiaceae
- Genus: Notogrammitis
- Species: N. crassior

Binomial name
- Notogrammitis crassior (Kirk) Parris

Synonyms
- Grammitis poeppigiana (Mett.) Pic.Serm.; Grammitis armstrongii Tindale

= Notogrammitis crassior =

Species of fern

Notogrammitis crassior, the alpine finger fern, is a fern in the family Polypodiaceae. Found growing in mats in cool areas, such as in cracks of rocks in high altitude country in Australia and New Zealand. Also recorded on sub-Antarctic islands such as Heard Island, Prince Edward Islands and Macquarie Island.
