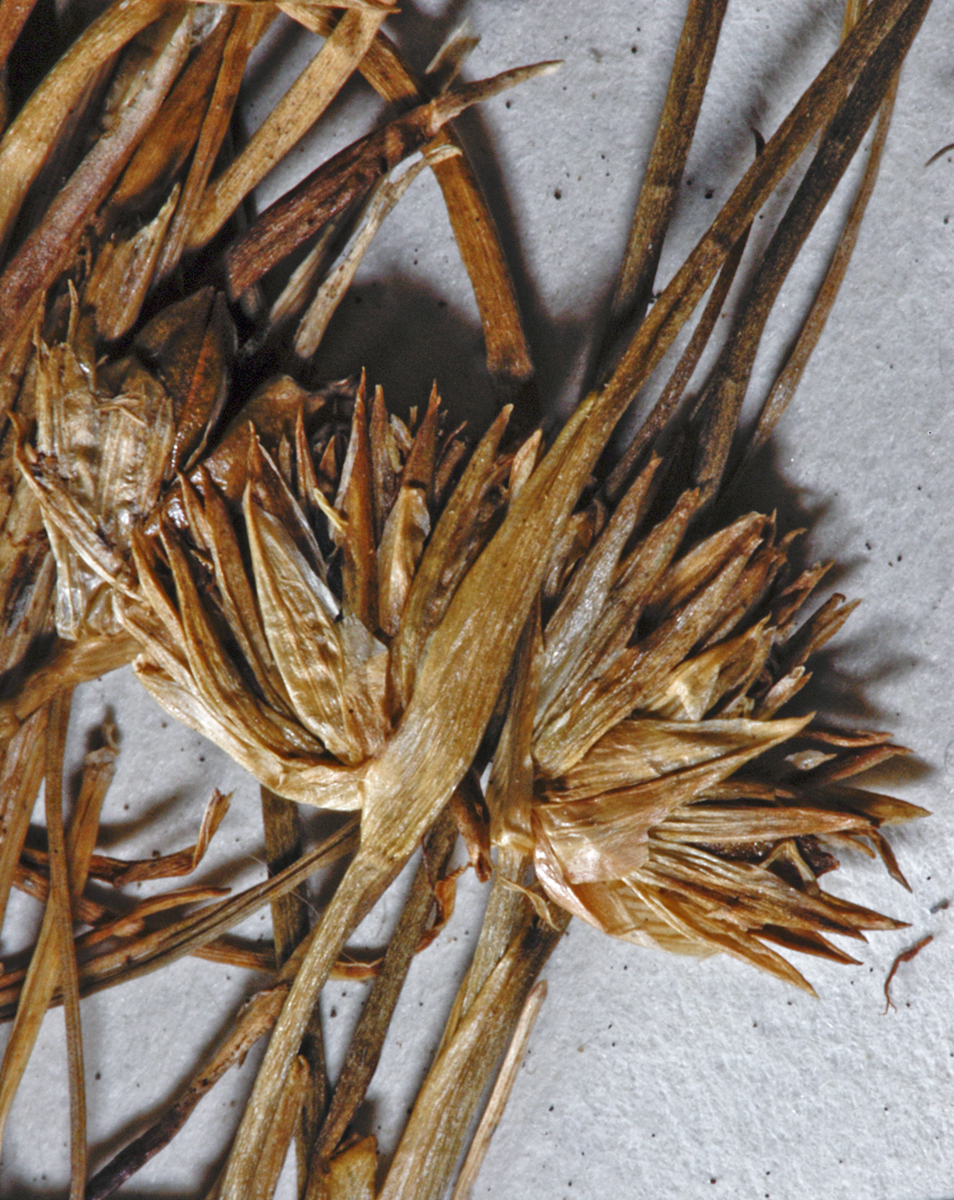

Scientific classification
- Kingdom: Plantae
- Clade: Tracheophytes
- Clade: Angiosperms
- Clade: Monocots
- Clade: Commelinids
- Order: Poales
- Family: Juncaceae
- Genus: Juncus
- Species: J. scheuchzerioides

Binomial name
- Juncus scheuchzerioides Gaudich.

Synonyms
- Juncus inconspicuus D Urv.; Juncus scheuchzerioides var. inconspicuus (D Urv.) Hook.f.

= Juncus scheuchzerioides =

Species of grass

Juncus scheuchzerioides is a species of rush variously called short rush or greater rush. It has an Antarctic circumpolar distribution and is native to many subantarctic islands in, and on the regions bordering, the Southern Ocean.

== Description ==
Juncus scheuchzerioides is a densely tufted, erect, perennial rush. It varies in colour from dark green to bright green and reddish-green. It is also variable in size, growing from 20 mm to 300 mm in height. Its stems are 20–200 mm long and 0.2-0.5 mm thick, densely branched from the base, with creeping fibrous roots extending from the basal nodes. The leaves are numerous, basal and cauline. The inflorescence is a compact head of 2-8 flowers, rarely producing a second head; the flowers are 4 mm long. It flowers from December to April, fruiting from February to July.

== Distribution and habitat ==
The rush is found on the Antipodes, Auckland, and Campbell Islands. It is also native to Macquarie Island, South Georgia and the Falkland, Kerguelen, Crozet and Prince Edward Islands, as well as Chile and Argentina in South America. It usually occupies habitats in or near running water, where it may form large stands, or wet, peaty turf, from sea level to 300 m above sea level.
