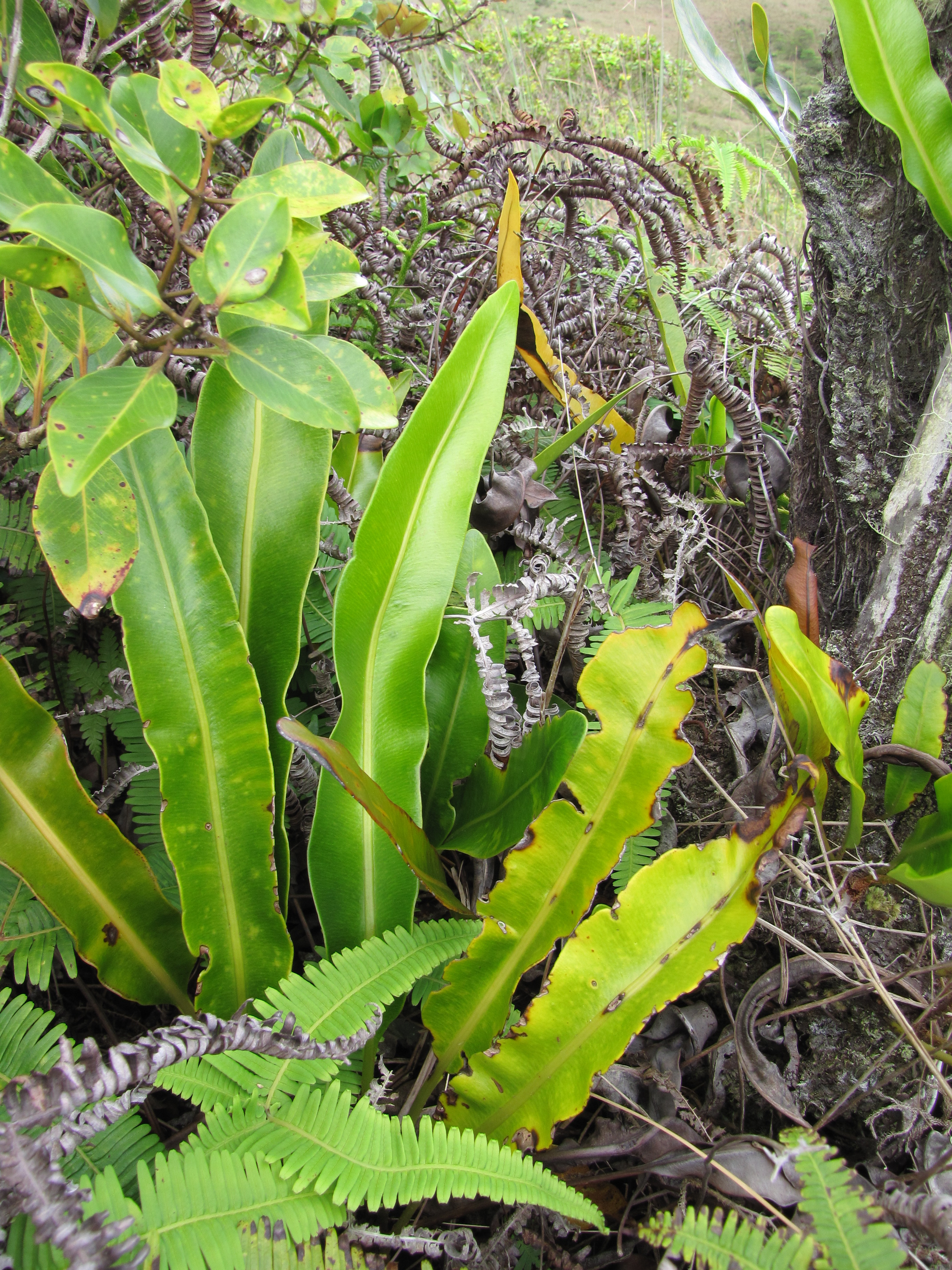

Scientific classification
- Kingdom: Plantae
- Clade: Tracheophytes
- Division: Polypodiophyta
- Class: Polypodiopsida
- Order: Polypodiales
- Suborder: Polypodiineae
- Family: Dryopteridaceae
- Genus: Elaphoglossum
- Species: E. crassifolium

Binomial name
- Elaphoglossum crassifolium (Gaudich.) W.R.Anderson & Crosby

= Elaphoglossum crassifolium =

Species of fern

Elaphoglossum crassifolium is a species of fern in the family Dryopteridaceae. It mainly inhabits the islands of Hawaii, of which it is native.
