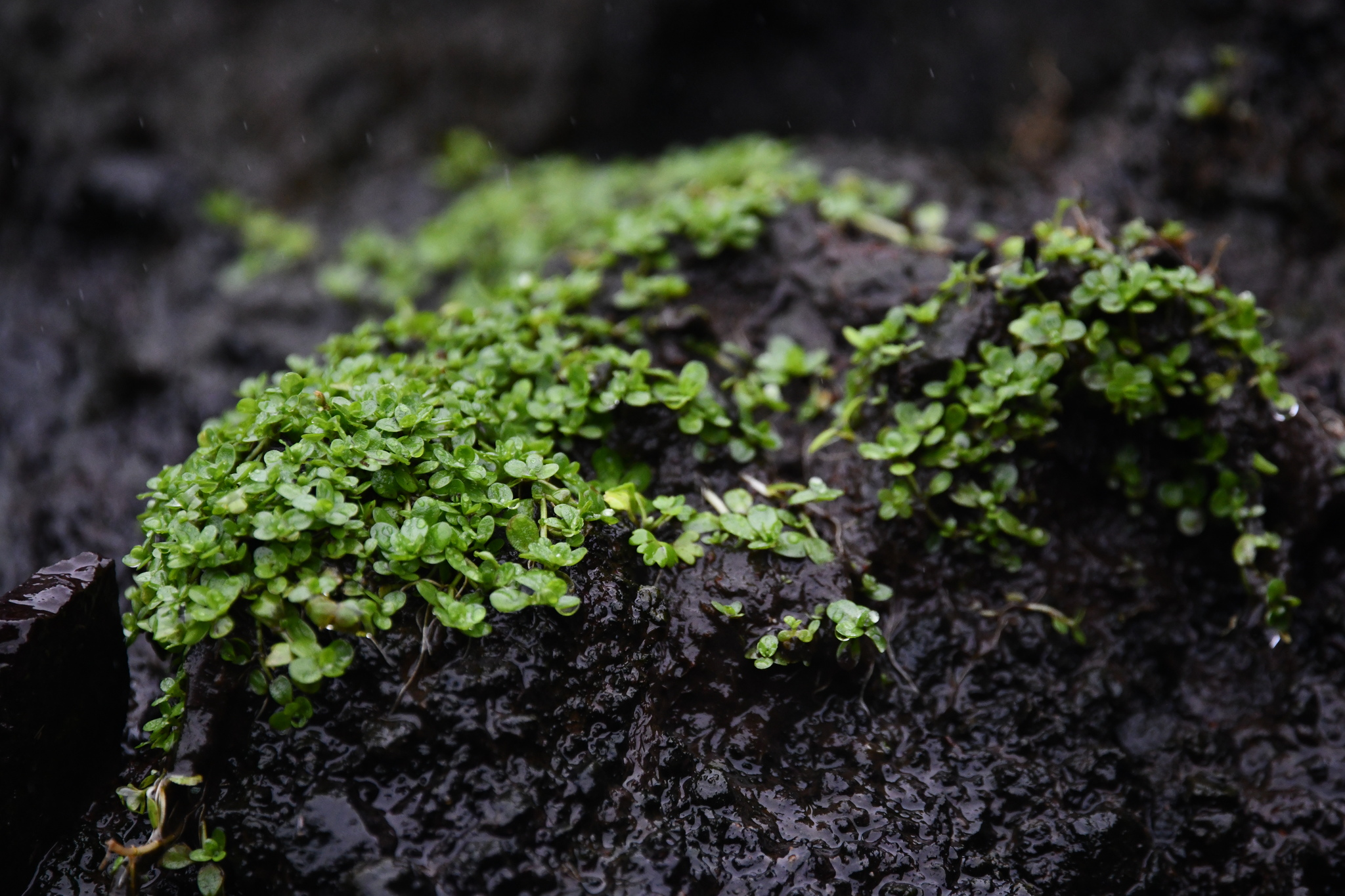

Scientific classification
- Kingdom: Plantae
- Clade: Embryophytes
- Clade: Tracheophytes
- Clade: Spermatophytes
- Clade: Angiosperms
- Clade: Eudicots
- Clade: Asterids
- Order: Lamiales
- Family: Plantaginaceae
- Genus: Callitriche
- Species: C. antarctica

Binomial name
- Callitriche antarctica Engelm. ex Hegelm. (1867)

= Callitriche antarctica =

Antarctic water-starwort

Species of aquatic plant

Callitriche antarctica, commonly known as the Antarctic water-starwort, is a small, prostrate plant with tiny yellow flowers in the family Plantaginaceae (though sometimes placed in its own family – Callitrichaceae). It is found in wet places on many subantarctic islands and has a wide circumantarctic distribution, something reflected in its specific epithet.

== Description ==
The starwort is a prostrate, mat-forming herb, with freely branched stems, rooting at the nodes. It has a similar appearance to watercress. The small, fleshy, spathulate leaves are usually 3–5 mm long and 1–2.5 mm wide. Flowering occurs from September to March. The yellowish to dull brown fruits are about a millimetre in diameter.

== Distribution and habitat ==
The starwort occurs on Campbell, Heard and Macquarie Islands, the Auckland, Antipodes, Kerguelen, Prince Edward, Crozet and Falkland Islands, as well as on South Georgia and Tierra del Fuego. The plant may be locally common, especially in boggy areas, along streams and around freshwater pools.
