= Elaphoglossum pattersoniae =

Scientific classification
- Kingdom: Plantae
- Clade: Tracheophytes
- Division: Polypodiophyta
- Class: Polypodiopsida
- Order: Polypodiales
- Suborder: Polypodiineae
- Family: Dryopteridaceae
- Genus: Elaphoglossum
- Species: E. pattersoniae

Binomial name
- Elaphoglossum pattersoniae Mickel

Species of plant

Elaphoglossum pattersoniae is a very rare species of fern that is native to Peru and Bolivia. It is very close to E. guamannianum, but is smaller in size, its blade apex is acute-obtuse, it lacks dark arachnidoid scales on its abaxial costa and has fewer blade scales. It is named after Juliet Patterson, a New York Botanical Garden collaborator.

== Description ==
Its rhizome is compact and horizontal; its scales linear and a lustrous red-brown in colour, about 4 millimetres (0.16 in) in size. Phyllopodia are present, with fasciculate fronds which are between 6 and 16 centimetres (2.4 and 6.3 in) long and between 1.2 and 1.8 centimetres (0.47 and 0.71 in) broad. Its scales are between 1 and 2 millimetres (0.039 and 0.079 in). Its veins are at a 55-60° angle, and hydathodes are lacking. Its costal scales are of an orange-tan colour and it lacks intersporangial scales.
