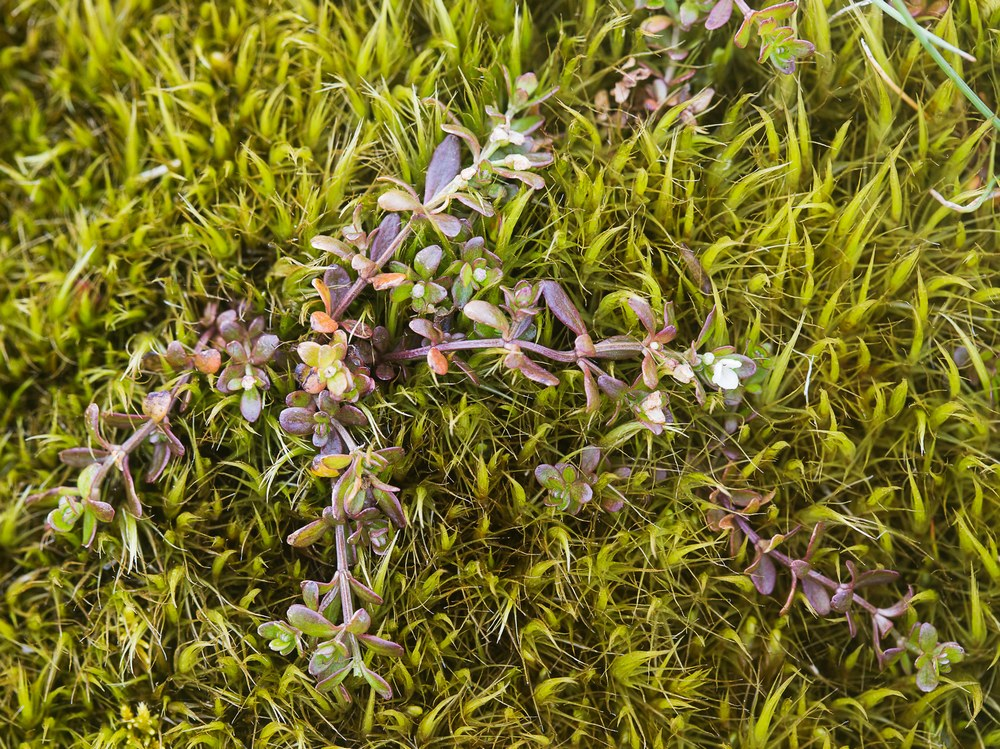

Scientific classification
- Kingdom: Plantae
- Clade: Tracheophytes
- Clade: Angiosperms
- Clade: Eudicots
- Clade: Asterids
- Order: Gentianales
- Family: Rubiaceae
- Genus: Galium
- Species: G. antarcticum

Binomial name
- Galium antarcticum Hook.f.

= Galium antarcticum =

Species of plant

Galium antarcticum, commonly known as Antarctic bedstraw or subantarctic bedstraw, is a species of flowering plant in the coffee family. It has a largely subantarctic range.

== Distribution and habitat ==
It is found in southern South America in Chile and southern Argentina, as well in the Falklands and South Georgia and on the Crozet, Kerguelen and Macquarie Islands. It occurs on damp ground, often on the margins of lakes and streams. The species is listed as Critically Endangered in Australia, due to its very small population on the Australian territory of Macquarie Island.

== Description ==
Antarctic bedstraw is a perennial herb that grows up to 50 mm in height. It is one of two species of vascular plants that grow in Antarctica. Its main stems are weak, prostrate and leafless, rooting at the nodes; the young stems are erect, sparsely branched, smooth and leafy. The leaves and stipules are similar, 3–4.5 mm in length, green-tinged with purple, smooth and fleshy. The flowers are solitary in upper axils; they lack a calyx and have a pinkish-buff corolla with long, yellowish stigmas. The fruits are dark brown and dry, splitting into two mericarps. The plants flower in January and fruit in February.
