= Elaphoglossum tovii =

Scientific classification
- Kingdom: Plantae
- Clade: Tracheophytes
- Division: Polypodiophyta
- Class: Polypodiopsida
- Order: Polypodiales
- Suborder: Polypodiineae
- Family: Dryopteridaceae
- Genus: Elaphoglossum
- Species: E. tovii

Binomial name
- Elaphoglossum tovii E.D.Br.

Species of fern

Elaphoglossum tovii is a species of plant discovered by E. Brown, it belongs to the genus Elaphoglossum and the family Dryopteridaceae. No subspecies are listed. It is native to the Marquesas Islands.
