= Carex austrocompacta =

Scientific classification
- Kingdom: Plantae
- Clade: Tracheophytes
- Clade: Angiosperms
- Clade: Monocots
- Clade: Commelinids
- Order: Poales
- Family: Cyperaceae
- Genus: Carex
- Species: C. austrocompacta

Binomial name
- Carex austrocompacta K.L.Wilson

Species of grass-like plant

Carex austrocompacta, commonly known as compact hook sedge, is a sedge that is found in south eastern parts of Australia and on many sub-antarctic islands, including Crozet Island and Kerguelen Island.

== See also ==
- List of Carex species
