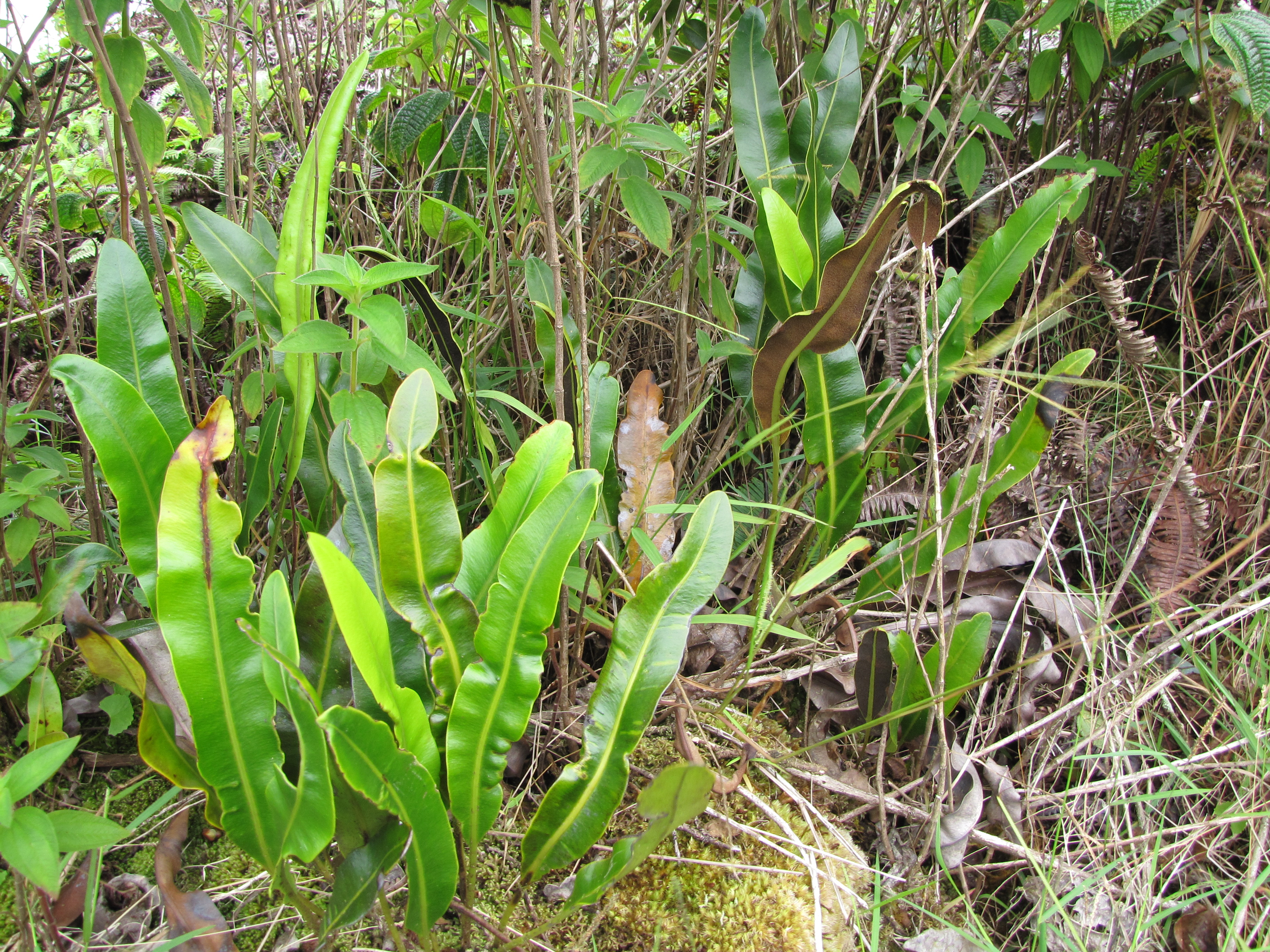
- Elaphoglossum crassifolium growing on Maui in the Hawaiian Islands

Scientific classification
- Kingdom: Plantae
- Clade: Tracheophytes
- Division: Polypodiophyta
- Class: Polypodiopsida
- Order: Polypodiales
- Suborder: Polypodiineae
- Family: Dryopteridaceae
- Subfamily: Elaphoglossoideae
- Genus: Elaphoglossum; Schott ex J.Sm.

Species
- See text.

Synonyms
- Aconiopteris C.Presl; Dictyoglossum J.Sm.; Hymenodium Fée; Microstaphyla C.Presl; Peltapteris Link; Rhipidopteris Schott

= Elaphoglossum =

Genus of ferns

Elaphoglossum is a genus of ferns in the family Dryopteridaceae, subfamily Elaphoglossoideae, in the Pteridophyte Phylogeny Group classification of 2016 (PPG I).

== Taxonomy ==
Elaphoglossum was first described in 1841 by John Smith, who attributed the name to Heinrich Schott. The name Elaphoglossum in botanical Latin means 'stag's tongue', in reference to the shape and texture of the leaf fronds.

=== Species ===
The genus has a large number of species. The Pteridophyte Phylogeny Group classification of 2016 (PPG I) suggested there were about 600; Plants of the World Online and the Checklist of Ferns and Lycophytes of the World both listed at least 730 as of January 2019. Species include:

- Elaphoglossum conforme (Sw.) J.Sm. (type species)
- Elaphoglossum pattersoniae Mickel
- Elaphoglossum peltatum (Sw.) Urban
- Elaphoglossum serpens Maxon & C.V.Morton
- Elaphoglossum tovii E.Brown
