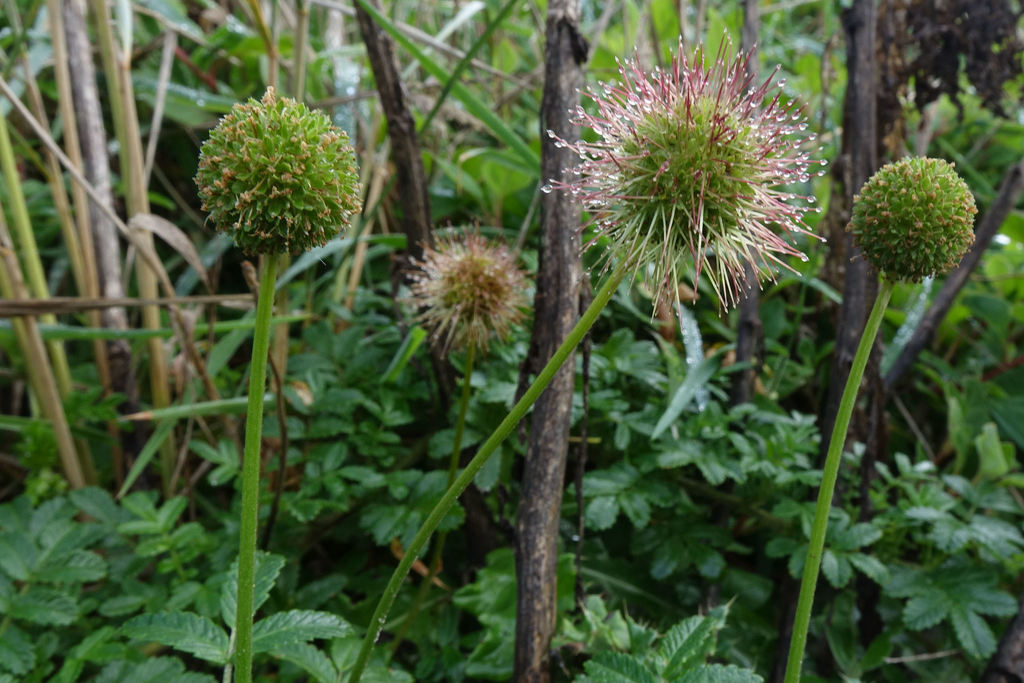

Scientific classification
- Kingdom: Plantae
- Clade: Tracheophytes
- Clade: Angiosperms
- Clade: Eudicots
- Clade: Rosids
- Order: Rosales
- Family: Rosaceae
- Genus: Acaena
- Species: A. pallida

Binomial name
- Acaena pallida (Kirk) Allan
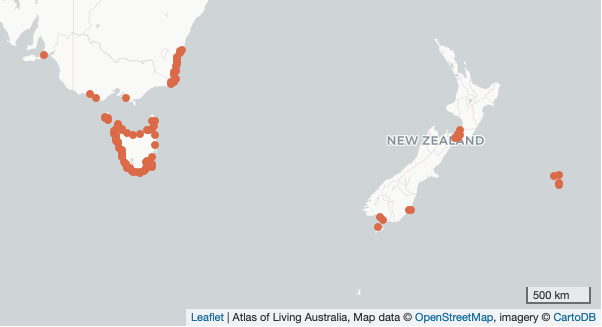
- Acaena pallida distribution map from Atlas of Living Australia

= Acaena pallida =

Sand bidibid

Australian / New Zealand native plant species

Acaena pallida, commonly known as the sand bidibid, sand piripiri, pale bidibid, or dune buzzy, is a prostrate, herbaceous plant in the Rosaceae family that is native to New Zealand and south-eastern Australia, including Tasmania. It lives in coastal areas, primarily on sand dunes.

== Description ==
Acaena pallida is a small perennial, herbaceous plant with a prostrate, stoloniferous growth habit. The main stems reach up to 1m in length and are usually 3-4mm in diameter. Younger stems are green and densely hairy, while older stems are tough and woody with dark brown bark, and may be as thick as 10mm. Erect stems reach up to 15cm in height. Stolons will root at the nodes, allowing the plant to expand and form a loose, trailing mat.

The leaves are 2.5-12cm in length, divided into 9-15 leaflets, 45-100mm long, with many blunt teeth. The upper surface of the leaf is glossy green with a wrinkled appearance. The lower surface is hairy and pale green to white, with epicuticular wax.

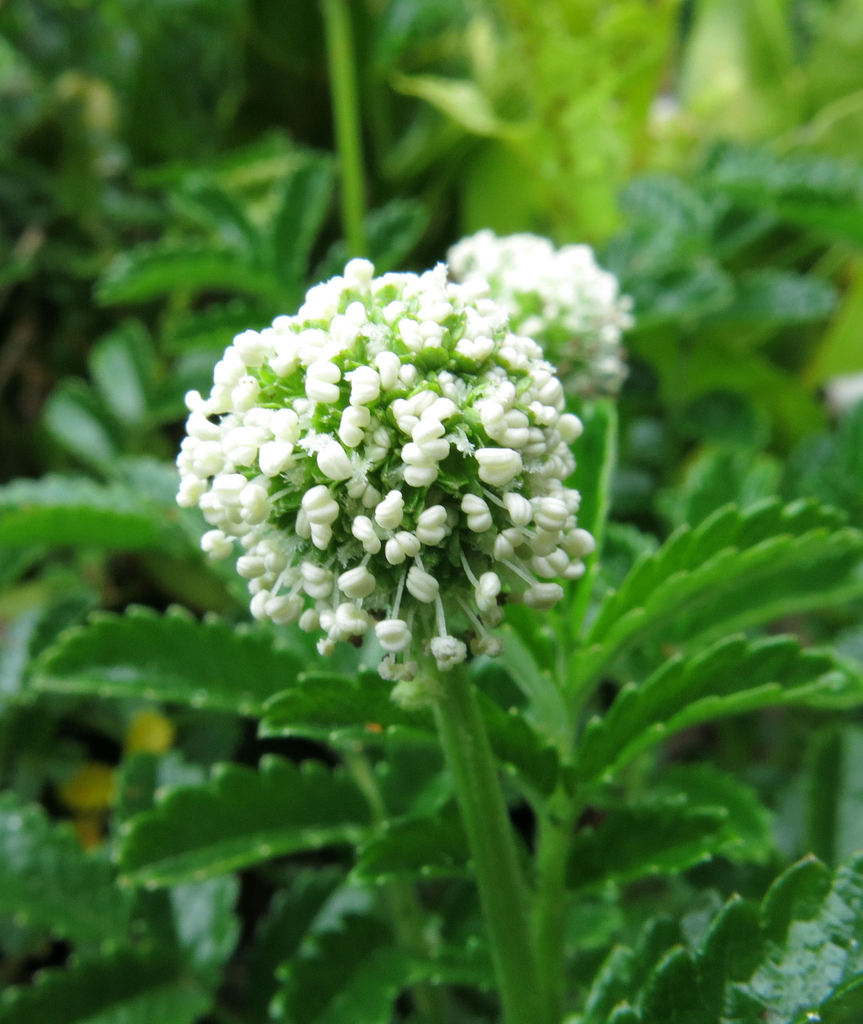
A young Acaena pallida inflorescence

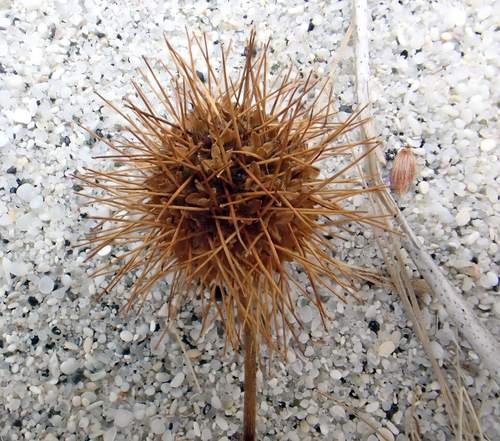
Acaena pallida inflorescence at fruiting

The inflorescence scape is 7-18cm long and hairy, terminating in a spherical inflorescence head of 80-90 florets. The head is approximately 10-12mm in diameter at flowering, reaching 25-40mm at fruiting. The individual florets consist of: 4 sepals, ovate to oblong and hairy underneath; 2 stamens, with white anthers; and 1 style, which is white. The florets have no petals. The fruit are conical and hairy, becoming dry and brown at maturity, with 4 barb-tipped spines on the top, and 1-2 much shorter subsidiary spines lower down on the fruit. The 4 top spines are red to light brown and 10-20mm long.

Information on phenology varies between sources. Flowering reportedly occurs from October through to January, and fruiting from October-December through to April-May. However, Lloyd et al. (2002) found production of new inflorescences to begin in October and continue for 32 weeks, suggesting flowering can occur through to April/May.

=== Differentiation from Acaena novae-zelandiae ===
Acaena pallida is similar in appearance to the more common Acaena novae-zelandiae, which can also be found in dune habitats alongside A. pallida. New leaves of A. novae zelandiae can be deceptively glossy/shiny on the upper surface. However, several differences can be used to distinguish the species. A. pallida is larger in almost all of its features: stems 3-4mm wide, instead of 1.5-2mm; leaves <100mm, compared to <60mm; leaflets 6-30 × 3-13 mm rather than 4-17 × 2-10 mm; capitulum <4cm in diameter instead of <3.5cm. A. pallida fruit have 1-2 shorter subsidiary spines below the 4 main spines, while A. novae-zelandiae fruit have none. The underside of A. pallida leaves is more densely hairy, with more epicuticular wax. The leaf rachis of A. novae-zelandiae is generally redder and less hairy than A. pallida.

== Evolution and taxonomy ==
=== Phylogeny and biogeography of Acaena ===
Acaena is currently believed to be a paraphyletic genus, with Polylepis, Margyricarpus, and Tetraglochin nested within it.

The genus is believed to have originated in Southern Africa, with the earliest known intercontinental dispersal event occurring 11.2 million years ago from South Africa to southern South America (Argentina/Chile). There, it diversified across different habitats, and dispersed to sub-antarctic regions, northern South America, Central America, and California. Long-distance dispersal from South America to New Zealand occurred in two discrete events, around 8.3 and 6.3 million years ago respectively. Further diversification occurred in New Zealand, as well as dispersal from there to Australia, Hawaii and back to South America.

Acaena pallida is thought to comprise a clade with other New Zealand Acaena species, with speciation only occurring in the last few million years. The phylogeny within this clade is currently unclear, partly due to the genetic and morphological variability within Acaena species, as well as the presence of hybrids. Its highly disjunct distribution within New Zealand may suggest it was once more widespread, but underwent local extinctions, leaving several relict populations. Alternatively, it may be a recent arrival to New Zealand.

== Habitat and distribution ==
=== Habitat ===
Acaena pallida is a specialist species that grows exclusively in coastal regions, where it is found primarily on sand dunes and in dune swales, and sometimes on fine gravels. It favours disturbed, unstable sand, particularly the foredune, and acts as a pioneer species colonizing and stabilizing these areas. It favours open, high sunlight areas with good drainage.

=== Distribution ===
Acaena pallida is native to New Zealand and south-eastern Australia. Within New Zealand, it has a highly disjunct distribution. On the North Island, it is present in Wellington Harbour and along the north side of Cook Strait. On the South Island, it is found in the region around Otago Harbour and at Bluff. It is also found at Mason Bay on Stewart Island, and on the Chatham Islands.

In Australia, the species is present in Tasmania and southern New South Wales. It is considered likely to also be present in Victoria. Several observations have been reported, however are currently still being treated as A. novae zelandiae until further review is conducted.

It has been introduced to California in the United States of America, where it is considered invasive and has been placed on the California Noxious Weeds List.

== Conservation status ==
Acaena pallida has been listed as "At Risk - Declining" in New Zealand since 2017. Coastal dune habitats in the North Island and Chatham Islands where Acaena pallida can be found have suffered substantial and ongoing degradation since the 2000s. Contributing factors include destruction of habitat for coastal development, invasion by weeds, increasing recreational use, and coastal erosion.

It is not considered threatened in Australia.

== Ecology ==
Acaena pallida has a "guerilla" growth strategy, meaning that it foregoes density in favour of rapid lateral expansion of stolons. This strategy is associated with species that like disturbance, allowing the plant to act as a pioneer species and opportunistically colonise newly disturbed areas.

It functions as a sand binding plant, helping to stabilise sand dunes. Wind-blown sand is trapped by the dense hairs on the stems and the loose mat-like structure of the plant.

The barbed spines present on A. pallida fruit can attach to animal fur or feathers, or human clothing, helping to disperse seed over longer distances.

In Tasmania, it is commonly found as an understorey component of Austrofestuca littoralis grassland.
