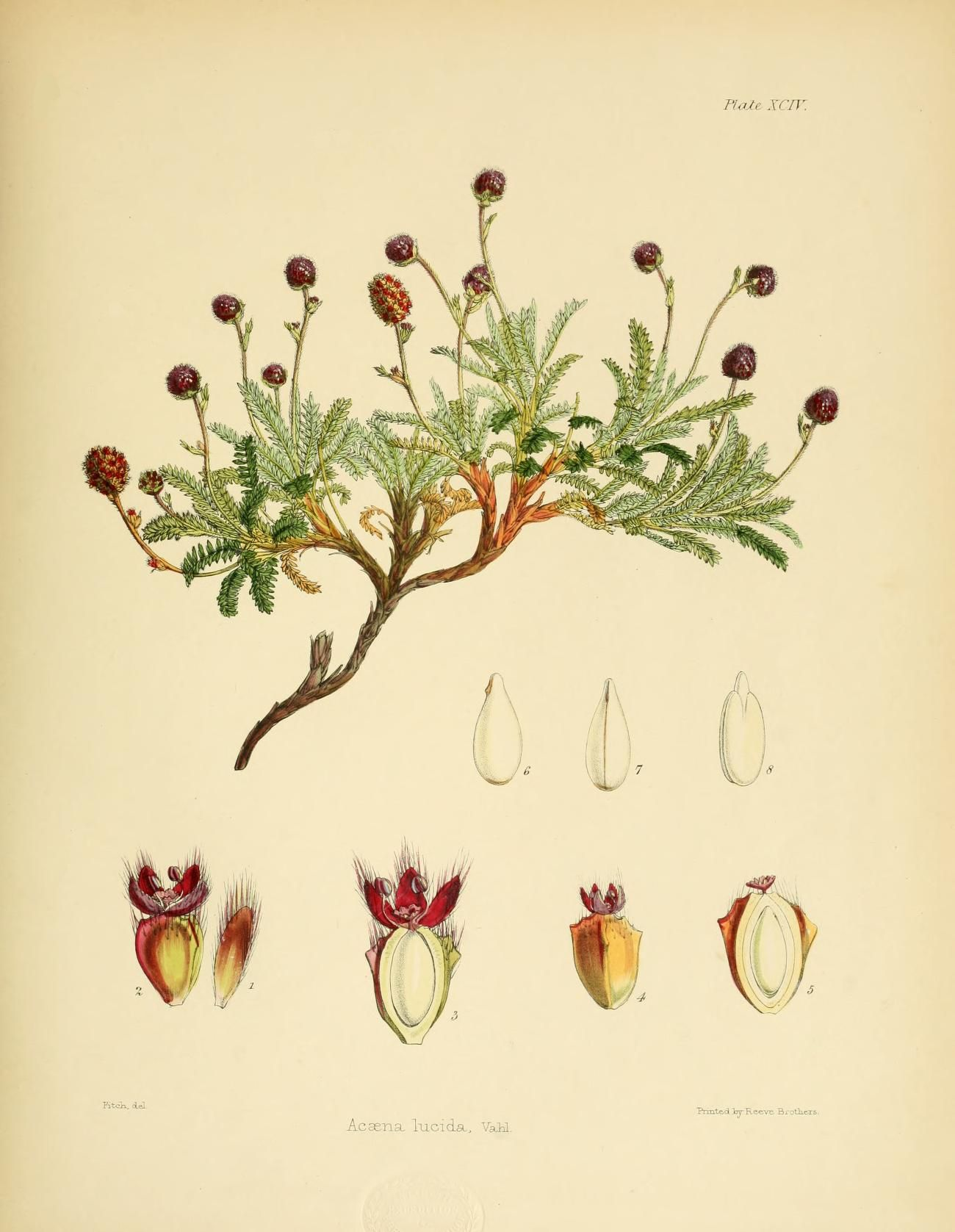
- Plate XCIV

Scientific classification
- Kingdom: Plantae
- Clade: Tracheophytes
- Clade: Angiosperms
- Clade: Eudicots
- Clade: Rosids
- Order: Rosales
- Family: Rosaceae
- Genus: Acaena
- Species: A. lucida

Binomial name
- Acaena lucida (Aiton) Vahl

Synonyms
- Acaena lucida var. abbreviata Bitter; Acaena lucida var. glabratula Bitter; Acaena lucida var. intermedia Bitter; Acaena lucida var. villosula Bitter; Acaena parvifolia Phil.; Ancistrum lucidum Aiton; Ancistrum lucidum Lam.

= Acaena lucida =

Species of flowering plant

Acaena lucida is a small plant in the Rosaceae family, which is native to southern Chile, southern Argentina and the Falkland Islands.

== Taxonomy and naming ==
Acaena lucida was first formally described in 1789 by William Aiton, as Ancistrum lucidum, but was assigned to the genus, Acaena, by Martin Vahl in 1804.

The genus name (Acaena) is derived from the Ancient Greek word akaina meaning "thorn" or "spine", and refers to the spiny hypanthium of many species of Acaena. The specific epithet, lucida, is Latin (lucidus, -a, -um) which means "shining", "clear" or "transparent", and in this instance was used by Aiton to mean "shining".
