= Solanum stellatiglandulosum =

Scientific classification
- Kingdom: Plantae
- Clade: Embryophytes
- Clade: Tracheophytes
- Clade: Angiosperms
- Clade: Eudicots
- Clade: Asterids
- Order: Solanales
- Family: Solanaceae
- Genus: Solanum
- Species: S. stellatiglandulosum

Binomial name
- Solanum stellatiglandulosum Bitter

Species of flowering plant

Solanum stellatiglandulosum is a species of flowering plant in the family Solanaceae. It belongs to the genus Solanum and was described by the German botanist Georg Bitter in 1920.

== Description ==
Solanum stellatiglandulosum grows as a shrub and may reach approximately 2–3 metres in height. The stems bear brown spines. Its leaves are simple, alternate, lobed and rough in texture. The flowers are white to purple, and the fruit is a berry that changes from green when immature to black when ripe.

== Distribution ==
The species is native to Colombia and occurs in the Andes. It has been recorded in Antioquia and numerous other Colombian departments, at elevations from approximately 800 to 3,700 metres.

== Uses ==
In eastern Antioquia, the fruits have traditionally been used for washing clothes, and the plant has been used to form living fences.
