= Acaena antarctica =

Scientific classification
- Kingdom: Plantae
- Clade: Tracheophytes
- Clade: Angiosperms
- Clade: Eudicots
- Clade: Rosids
- Order: Rosales
- Family: Rosaceae
- Genus: Acaena
- Species: A. antarctica

Binomial name
- Acaena antarctica Hook.f.

Synonyms
- Acaena antarctica var. argutidentata Bitter; Acaena microcephala Schltdl.; Acaena pearcei Phil.; Acaena pearcei var. glabrinervis Bitter; Acaena pumila Phil.; Acaena tenuifolia Bitter

Species of flowering plant

Acaena antarctica is a small herbaceous plant in the Rosaceae family native to Argentina, Chile and the Falkland Islands.

== Taxonomy and naming ==
Acaena antarctica was first formally described in 1846 by Joseph Dalton Hooker. Kew holds specimens collected by Hooker from Hermite Island, Cape Horn on the Ross expedition.

The genus name Acaena is derived from the Ancient Greek word akaina meaning "thorn" or "spine", referring to the spiny calyx of many species of Acaena. The specific epithet, antarctica, derives from the Greek (anti, "opposite" and arktos, "bear") and designates the place opposite the constellations of the Great and the Little Bear, thus describing the species as coming from south of the South Pole circle.
