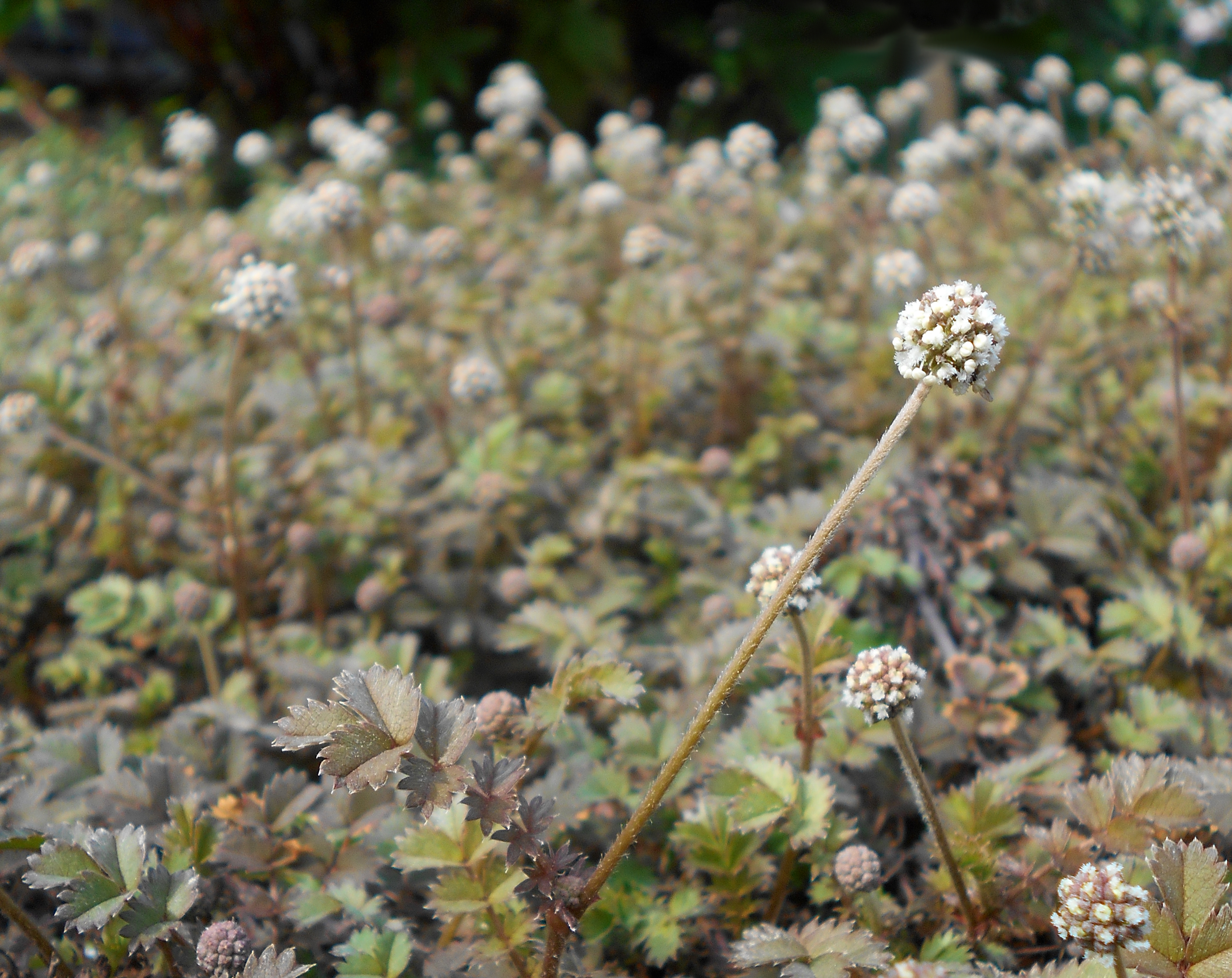

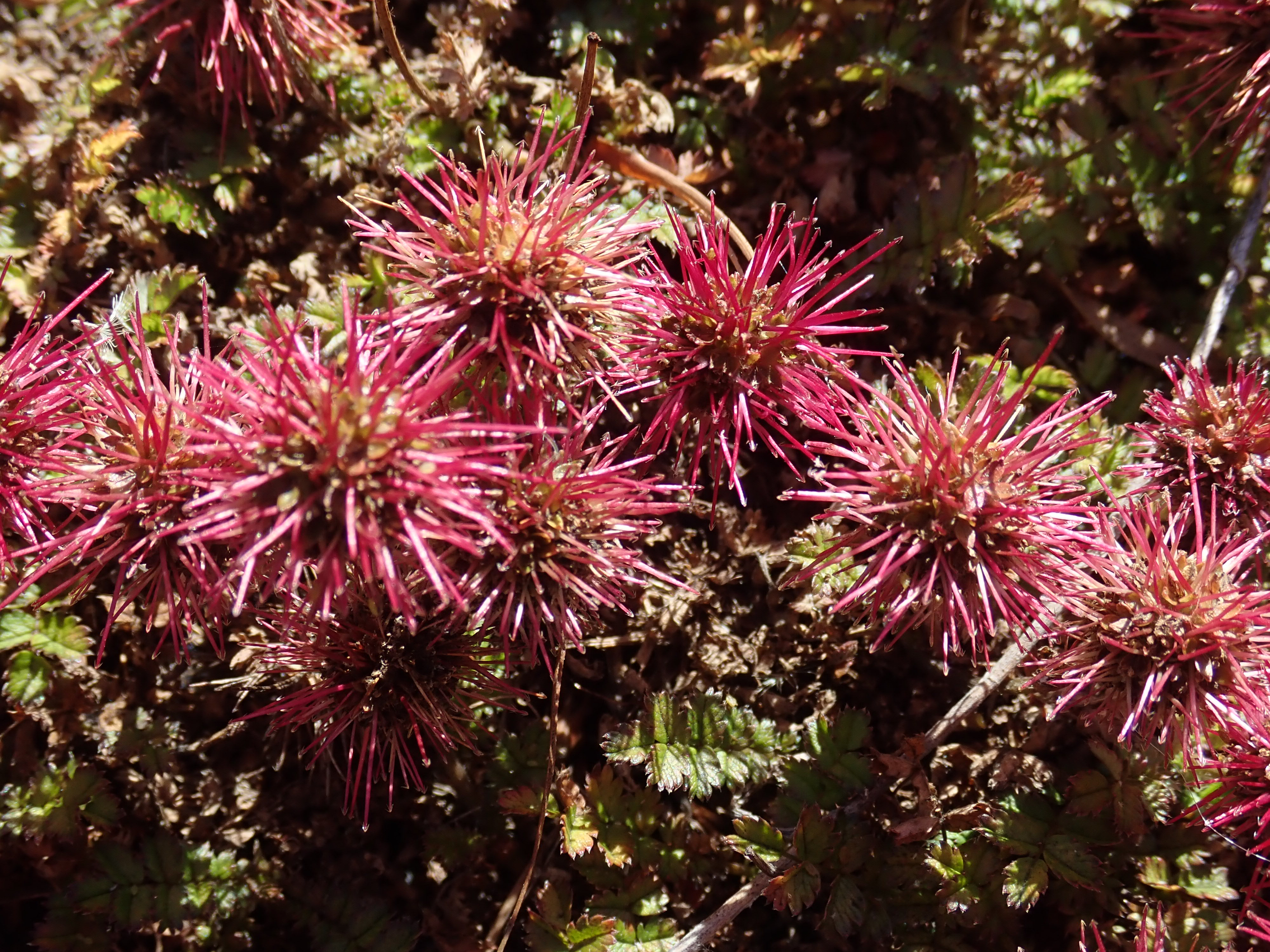

Conservation status
- Declining (NZ TCS)

Scientific classification
- Kingdom: Plantae
- Clade: Tracheophytes
- Clade: Angiosperms
- Clade: Eudicots
- Clade: Rosids
- Order: Rosales
- Family: Rosaceae
- Genus: Acaena
- Species: A. microphylla

Binomial name
- Acaena microphylla Hook.f.

= Acaena microphylla =

Species of flowering plant

Acaena microphylla, the bidibid or piripiri, and outside New Zealand, New Zealand-bur, is a small herbaceous, prostrate perennial flowering plant in the rose family Rosaceae, native to both the North and South Islands of New Zealand. There are two varieties:

- Acaena microphylla var. pauciglochidiata Bitter
- Acaena microphylla Hook.f var. microphylla

There are no synonyms.

== Description ==
Hooker describes it as "a very small and glabrous species; the leaflets not 1/4 in. long. Capitula very large for the size of the plant, upwards of an inch across, including the spines, which are not barbate, and distinguish it as a species."

== Taxonomy and naming ==
Acaena microphylla was first formally described in 1852 by Joseph Dalton Hooker. The genus name Acaena is derived from the ancient Greek word akaina, meaning "thorn" or "spine", referring to the spiny calyx of many species of Acaena. The specific epithet microphylla derives from the Greek words, mikros (small) and phyllon (leaf), to give an adjective meaning "small-leaved".

== Distribution ==
It is found on both the North Island and South Island of New Zealand.

== Conservation status ==
In 2013, the variety Acaena microphylla var. pauciglochidiata was classified as "At Risk - Naturally Uncommon" under the New Zealand Threat Classification System. By 2018, due to an actual decline, the status changed to "At Risk - Declining". (The area of occupancy had decreased to 100 km^{2} or less, and the predicted decline was 10 to 50%). However, the variety Acaena microphylla var. microphylla was classified as "Not Threatened" in 2004, 2009 and 2012, and again in 2018.
