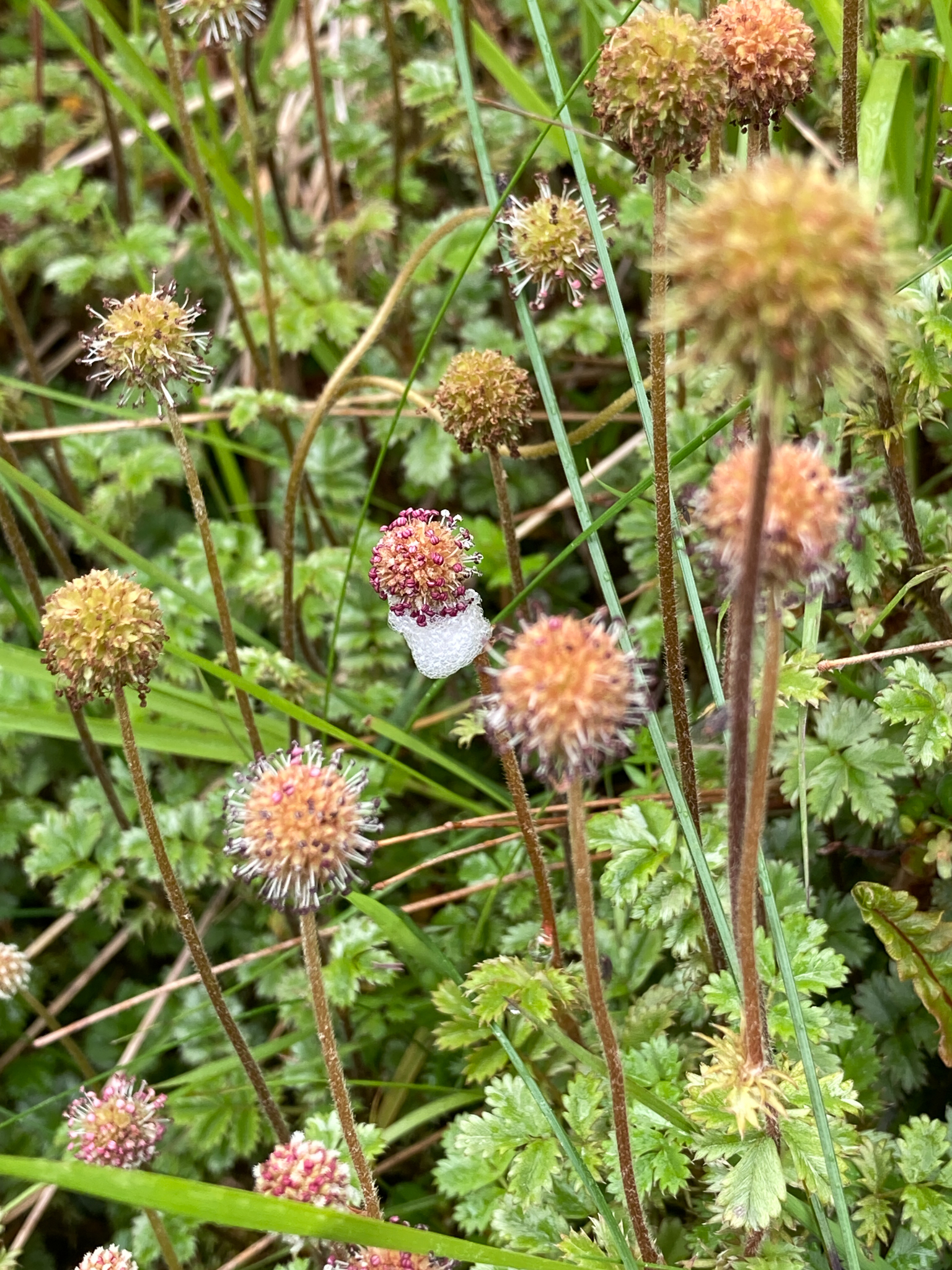
- Acaena anserinifolia in Fiordland National Park

Conservation status
- Not Threatened (NZ TCS)

Scientific classification
- Kingdom: Plantae
- Clade: Embryophytes
- Clade: Tracheophytes
- Clade: Angiosperms
- Clade: Eudicots
- Clade: Rosids
- Order: Rosales
- Family: Rosaceae
- Genus: Acaena
- Species: A. anserinifolia

Binomial name
- Acaena anserinifolia (J.R.Forst. & G.Forst.) J.B.Armstr.

Synonyms
- Ancistrum anserinifolium J.R.Forst. & G.Forst.

= Acaena anserinifolia =

Species of flowering plant

Acaena anserinifolia, the bidibidi, hutiwai, or piripiri, is a species of plant, endemic to New Zealand. It has been introduced to the United Kingdom and Ireland. Known for its distinctive hooked seeds which easily attach to clothing and animals, bidibidi can be used to make a tea, used by both Māori and Pākehā settlers in New Zealand, as well as in ointments for wounds and medical purposes.

== Description ==
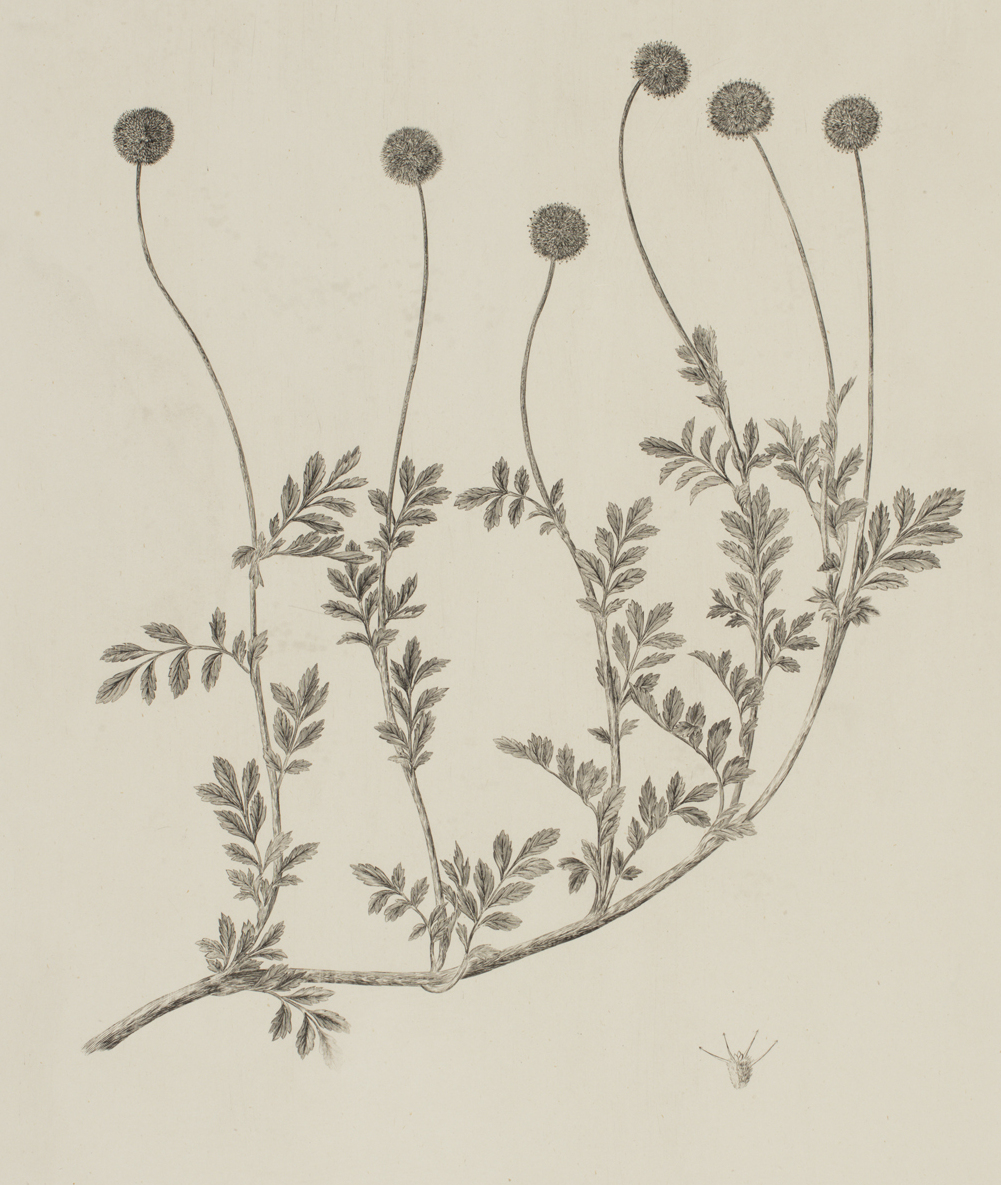
1895 botanical illustration by Sydney Parkinson

The bidibidi is a small plant with deeply divaricated opposite leaflets and long stems ending in a globular capitulum. The flowers are pink, red, or white.

It can be distinguished from Acaena novae-zelandiae by "the distinctive tuft of brush-like hairs surmounting the leaf teeth apices," and by silvery leaf undersides.

== Taxonomy ==
The species was first described as Ancistrum anserinifolium in 1775 by Johann Reinhold Forster and Georg Forster; father-and-son naturalists who came to New Zealand aboard the Second voyage of James Cook. Their work was published in the book Characteres generum plantarum. In 1880, Joseph Beattie Armstrong recombined the species, placing it in the genus Acaena, which remains the current accepted scientific name today.

== Etymology ==
The Māori language name piripiri is used for a variety of Acaena species found in New Zealand. Piri is a word used across various Polynesian languages for sticky plants. Other Māori language names for the plant include huruhuru o Hine-nui-te-pō ("feathers of Hine-nui-te-pō"), pirikahu, hutiwai; many other names include the elements kaiā (thief) and rure (scatter), including kaiā, kaikaiārure and kaikaiā. The English language name biddy-bid is based on a mishearing of the Māori word piripiri, and over time the word biddy developed as a verb in New Zealand English, meaning to remove seeds from clothing.

The species epithet, Anserinifolia, is a reference to the leaves, which are like Potentilla anserina.

== Ecology ==
The species' ability to attach seeds to clothing likely evolved as a way to disburse seeds by attaching to the feathers of flightless birds, including kiwi, weka and moa.

== Distribution and habitat ==
Acaena anserinifolia is native to the North Island, South Island, Stewart Island, and the Chatham Islands in New Zealand. It has been introduced to Antipodean Islands, Great Britain and Ireland. It is naturalised on the Auckland Islands and Campbell Island. The plant grows in lowland to subalpine areas, and on forest edges. They are sometimes hydrorphytic.

== Traditional Māori cultural uses ==
Boiled piripiri leaves are used in traditional rongoā medicinal practices, either as a healing tonic or a lotion applied to skin. Smoke from burning piripiri was a traditional remedy for people who had been poisoned by tutu.

== European uses ==
Early European settlers developed a tea made from boiling the leaves of the plant in times when imported tea leaves were scarce. The seeds of the plant are an issue for livestock farmers in New Zealand, as their ability to stick to animal fur can injure livestock or sling to wool, making it difficult to process.

Acaena anserinifolia is grown as a garden plant in Europe and North America.

== Gallery ==
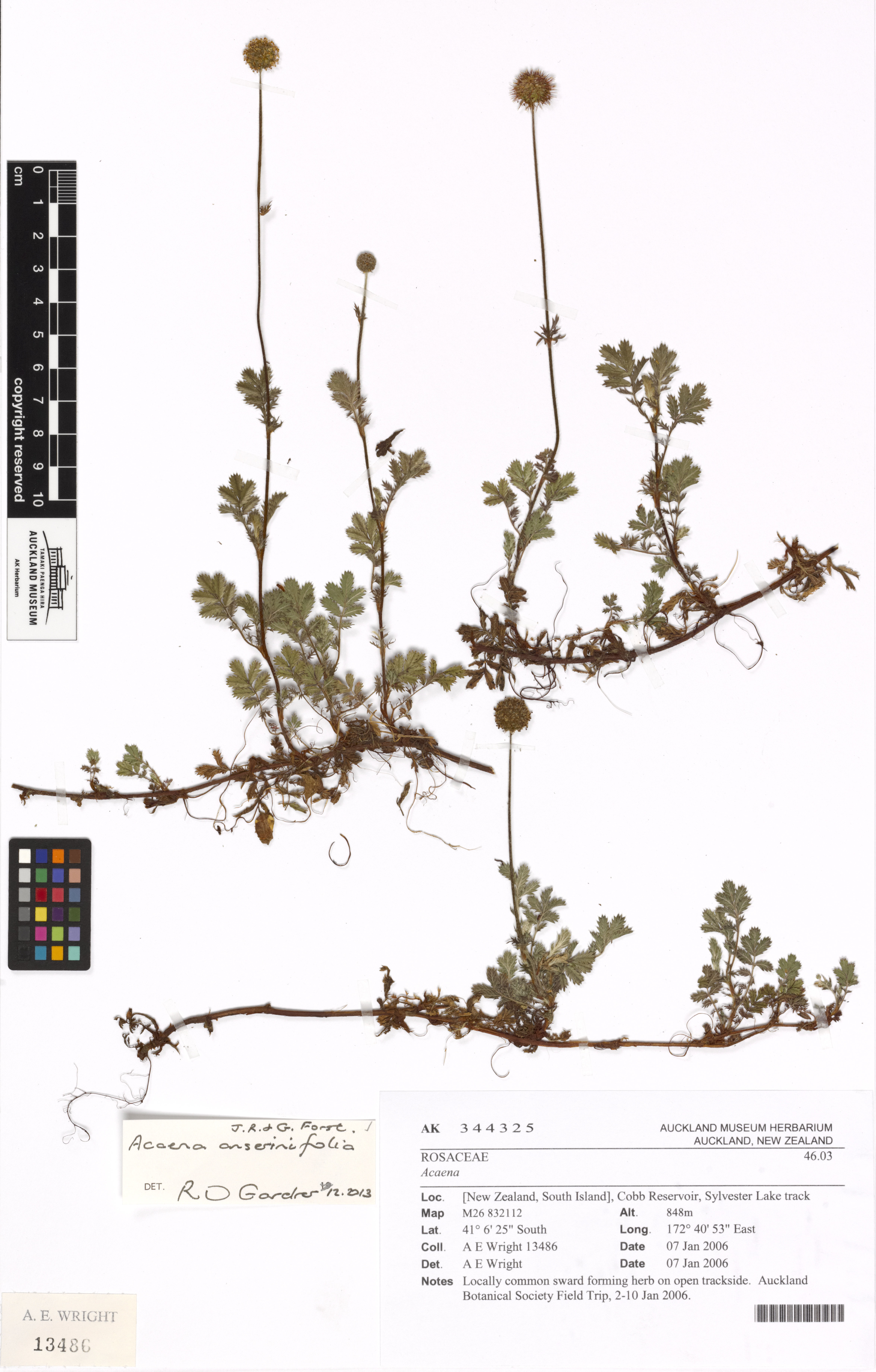
Herbarium specimen

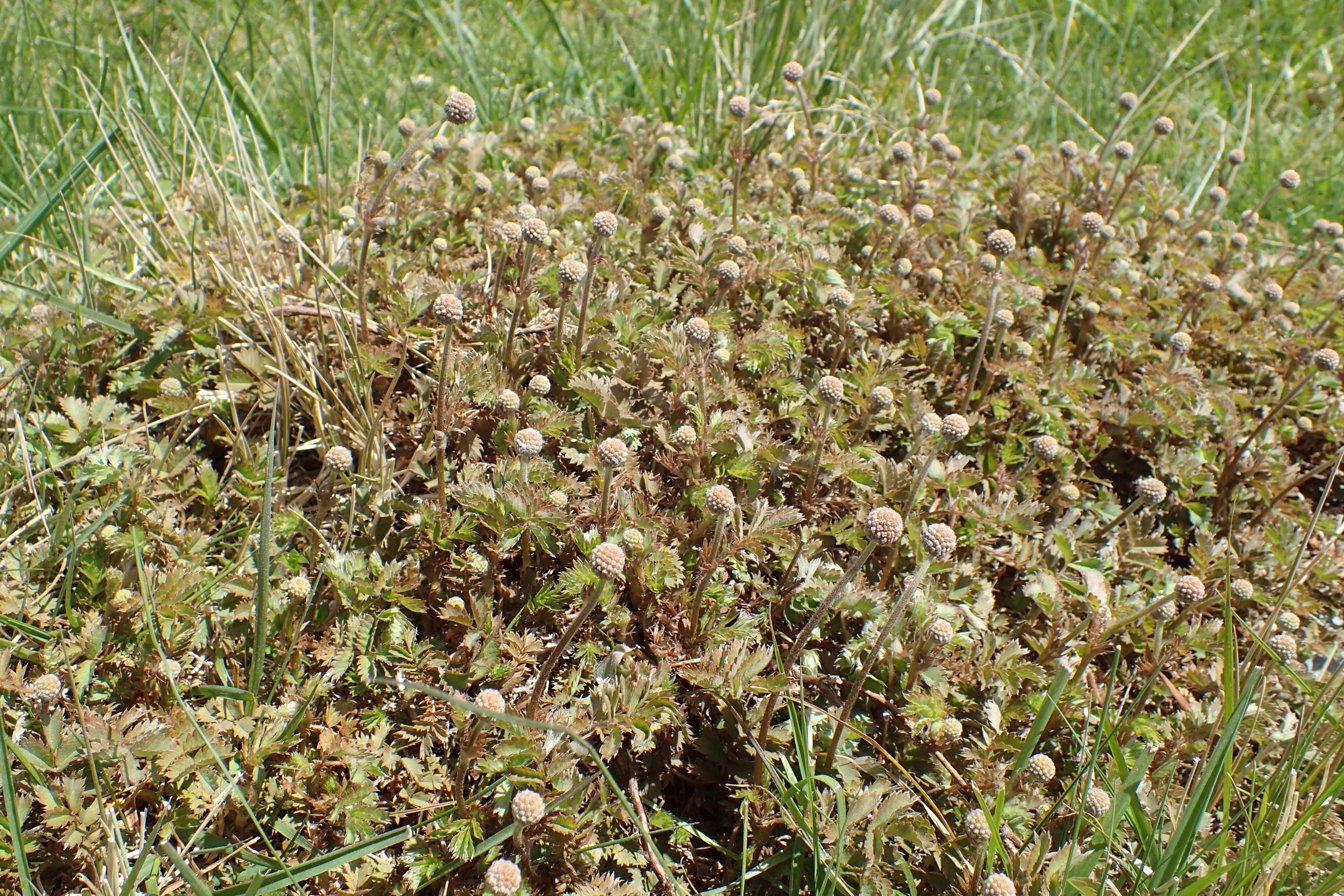
Patch of Acaena anserinifolia

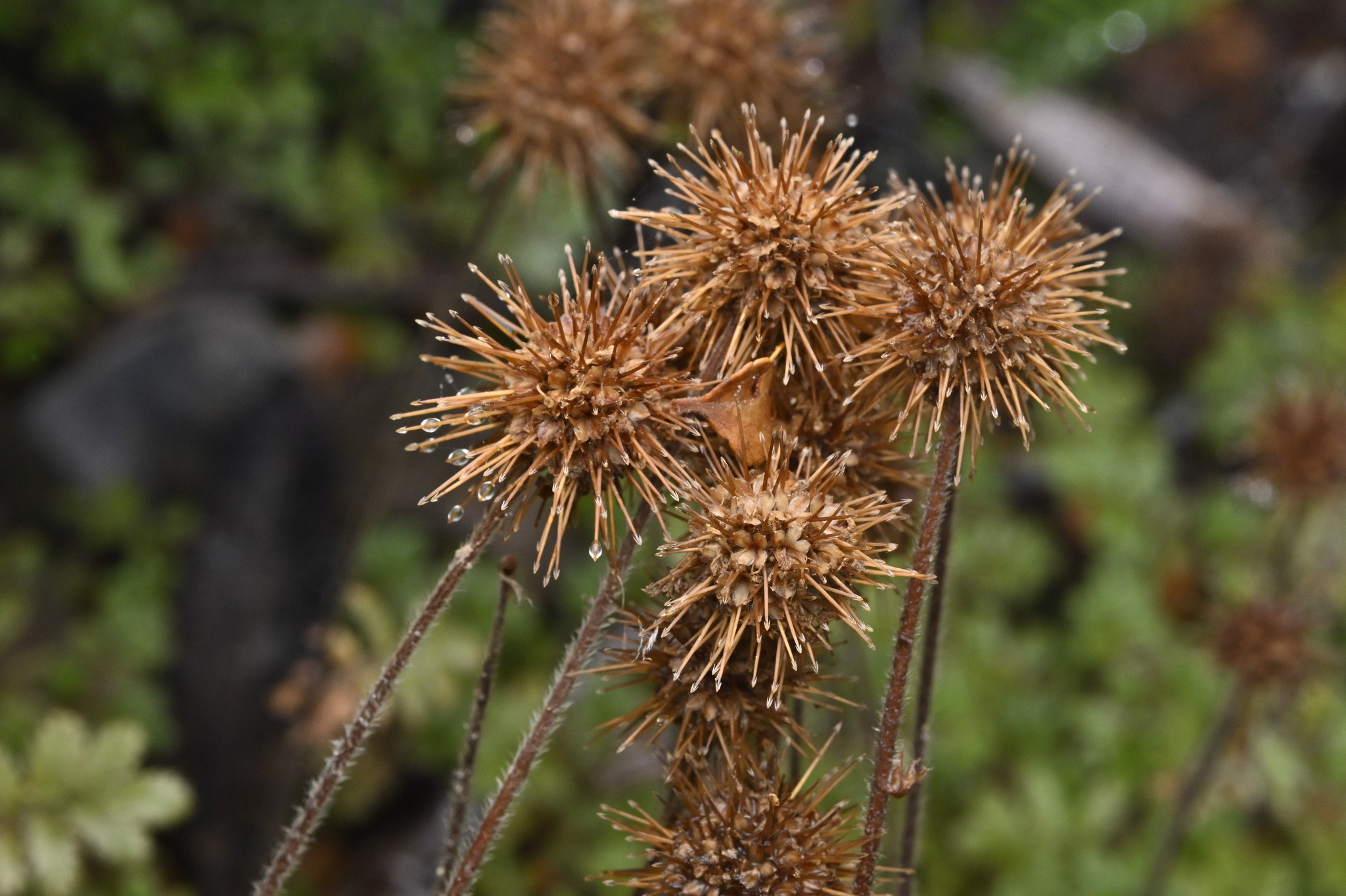
Seed pods

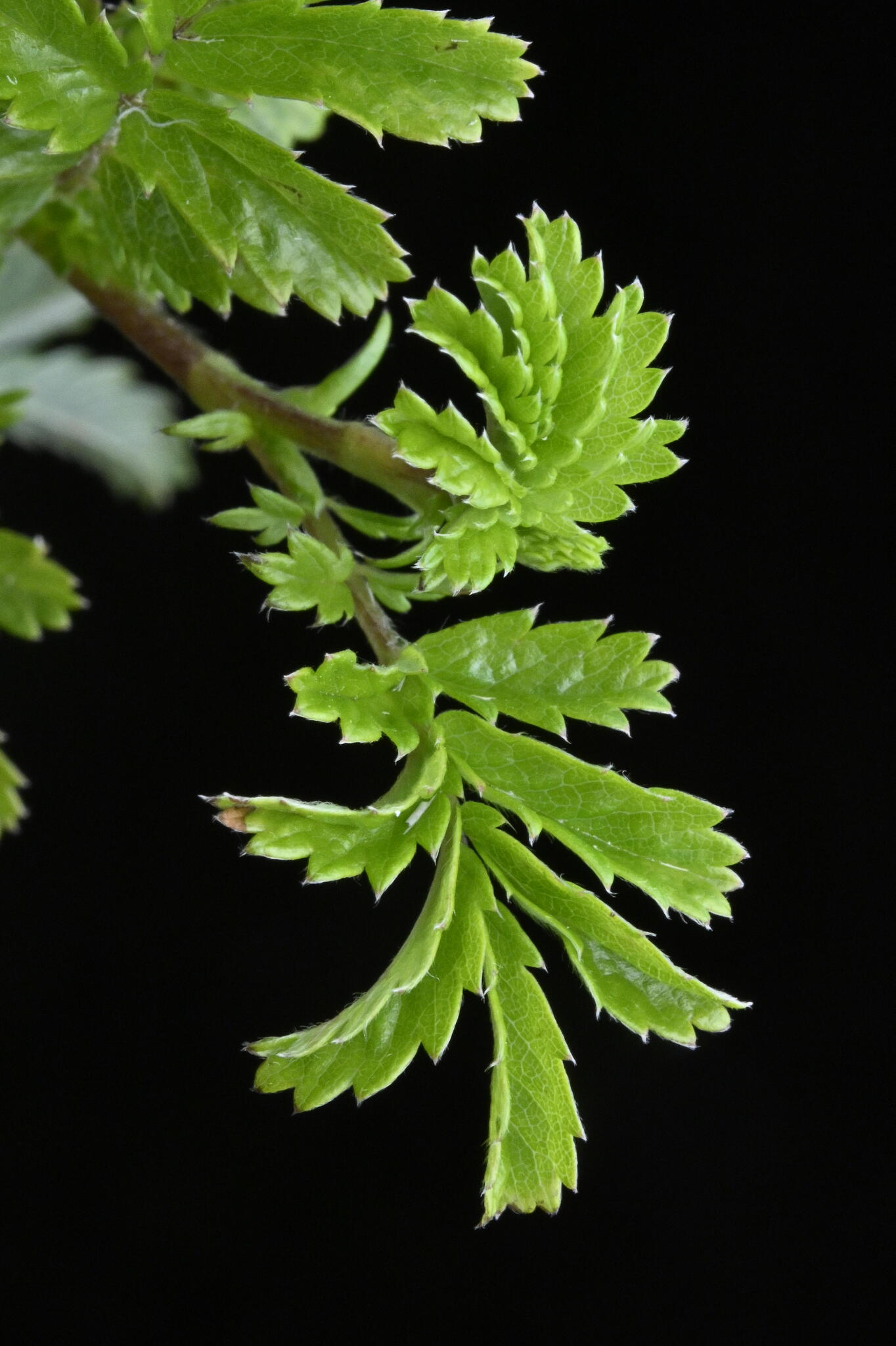
Leaves

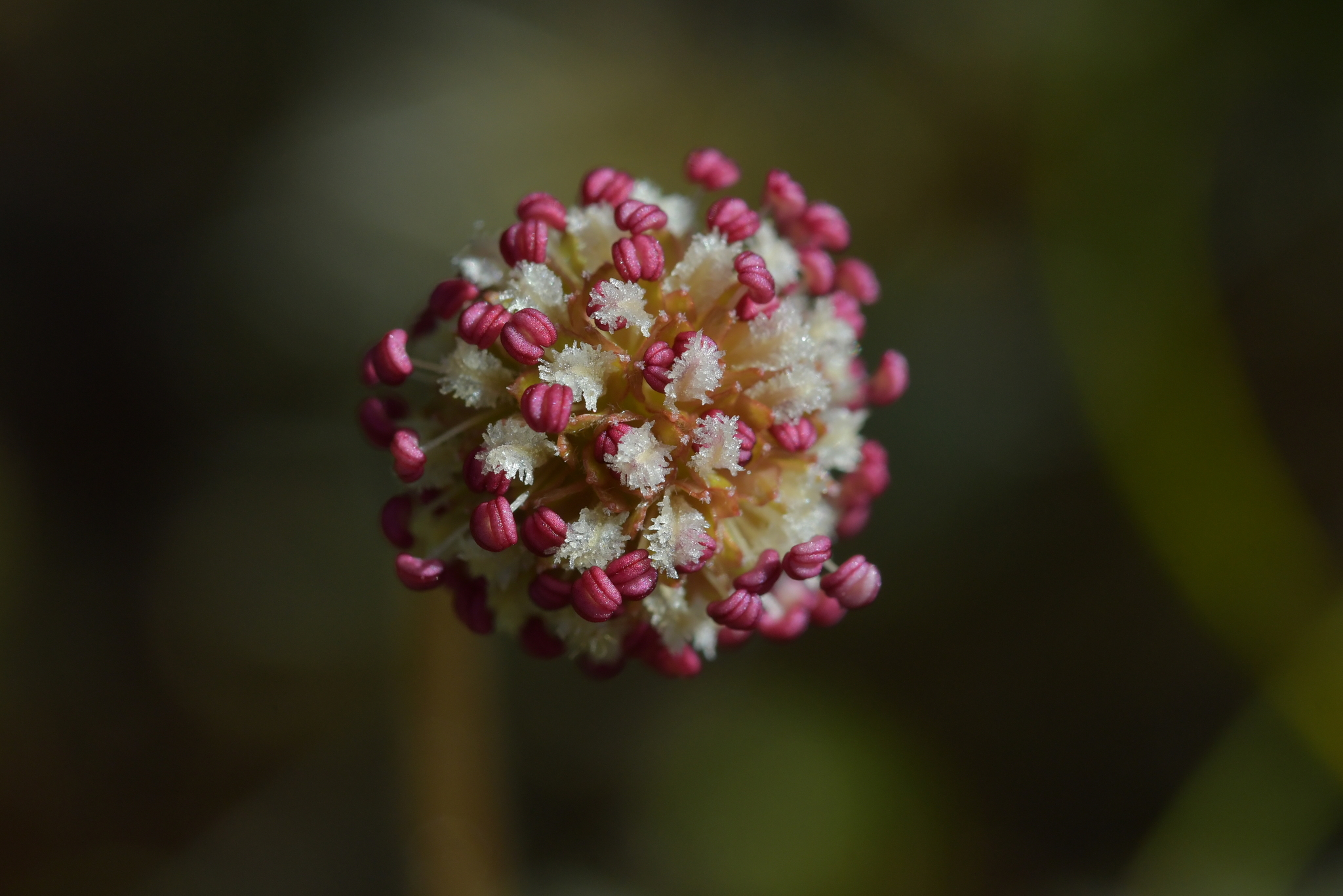
Flower
