= A. minor =

A. minor may refer to:

- Acaena minor, a flowering plant of Oceania
- Astrantia minor, a flowering plant
