= Acaena tenera =

Scientific classification
- Kingdom: Plantae
- Clade: Tracheophytes
- Clade: Angiosperms
- Clade: Eudicots
- Clade: Rosids
- Order: Rosales
- Family: Rosaceae
- Genus: Acaena
- Species: A. tenera

Binomial name
- Acaena tenera Albov

Species of plant

Acaena tenera, the lesser burnet, is a plant in the rose family Rosaceae. It is native to Patagonia and some subantarctic islands.

== Description ==
Acaena tenera grows as a shrub-like herb. The species is similar to the greater burnet (Acaena magellanica), but smaller in size and growing lower to the ground. The leaves consist of up to six leaflets and are glossy green with a reddish border. Inflorescences grow at the top of a stem measuring 3–8 cm (1–3 in) long. The seeds are barbed and attach readily to fur and feathers.

== Distribution and habitat ==
Acaena tenera is native to Patagonia, South Georgia and the Falkland Islands. It is found widely with the most common habitat being in dry, stony terrain at altitudes up to 600 m (2,000 ft).
