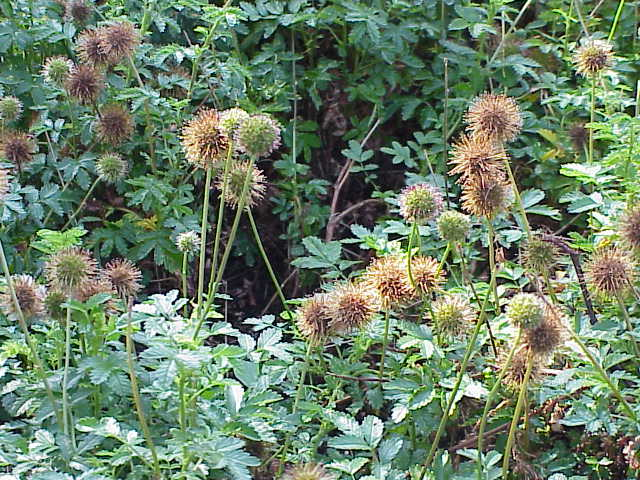
- Acaena novae-zelandiae foliage and various fruiting stages

Scientific classification
- Kingdom: Plantae
- Clade: Embryophytes
- Clade: Tracheophytes
- Clade: Spermatophytes
- Clade: Angiosperms
- Clade: Eudicots
- Clade: Rosids
- Order: Rosales
- Family: Rosaceae
- Subfamily: Rosoideae
- Tribe: Sanguisorbeae
- Subtribe: Sanguisorbinae
- Genus: Acaena; Mutis ex L.

Species
- See text

Synonyms
- Ancistrum J.R.Forst. & G.Forst.

= Acaena =

Genus of flowering plants

Acaena is a genus of about 60 species of mainly evergreen, creeping herbaceous perennial plants and subshrubs in the family Rosaceae, native mainly to the Southern Hemisphere, notably New Zealand, Australia and South America, but with a few species extending into the Northern Hemisphere, north to Hawaii (A. exigua) and California (A. pinnatifida).

The leaves are alternate, 4–15 centimetres (1.6–5.9 in) long, and pinnate or nearly so, with 7–21 leaflets. The flowers are produced in a tight globose [inflorescence] 1–2 centimetres (0.39–0.79 in) in diameter, with no petals. The fruit is also a dense ball of many seeds; in many (but not all) species the seeds bear a barbed arrowhead point, the seedhead forming a burr which attaches itself to animal fur or feathers for dispersal.

Several Acaena species in New Zealand are known by the common name bidibid. The word is written variously bidi-bidi, biddy-biddy, biddi-biddi, biddi-bid and a number of other variations. These names are the English rendition of the original Māori name of piripiri. The plant is also called the New Zealand burr. The species Acaena microphylla has gained the Royal Horticultural Society's Award of Garden Merit.

== Etymology ==
The generic name Acaena is derived from the Greek "akaina" (thorn), referring to the spiny hypanthium.

== Species ==
As of 2020, Plants of the World Online accepted the following species:

- Acaena agnipila Gand.
- Acaena alpina Poepp. ex Walp.
- Acaena anserinifolia (J.R.Forst. & G.Forst.) J.B.Armstr.
- Acaena antarctica Hook.f.
- Acaena argentea Ruiz & Pav.
- Acaena boliviana Gand.
- Acaena buchananii Hook.f.
- Acaena caesiiglauca (Bitter) Bergmans – glaucous pirri-pirri-bur
- Acaena caespitosa Gillies ex Hook. & Arn.
- Acaena confertissima Bitter
- Acaena cylindristachya Ruiz & Pav.
- Acaena dumicola B.H.Macmill. (South Island of New Zealand)
- Acaena echinata Nees – sheep's burr
- Acaena elongata L.
- Acaena emittens B.H.Macmill. (North Island of New Zealand)
- Acaena eupatoria Cham. & Schltdl.
- Acaena exigua A.Gray – liliwai (Hawaiʻi)
- Acaena fissistipula Bitter
- Acaena fuscescens Bitter
- Acaena glabra Buchanan
- Acaena hirsutula Bitter
- Acaena inermis Hook.f.
- Acaena integerrima Gillies ex Hook. & Arn.
- Acaena juvenca B.H.Macmill. (New Zealand)
- Acaena latebrosa W.T.Aiton
- Acaena leptacantha Phil.
- Acaena longiscapa Bitter
- Acaena lucida (Aiton) Vahl
- Acaena macrocephala Poepp.
- Acaena magellanica (Lam.) Vahl – greater burnet
- Acaena masafuerana Bitter
- Acaena microphylla Hook.f. – New Zealand-bur
- Acaena minor (Hook.f.) Allan
- Acaena montana Hook.f.
- Acaena myriophylla Lindl.
- Acaena novae-zelandiae Kirk – red bidibid (New Zealand)
- Acaena ovalifolia (Vahl) Ruiz & Pav.
- Acaena ovina A.Cunn.
- Acaena pallida (Kirk) Allan – sand bidibid
- Acaena patagonica A.E.Martic.
- Acaena pinnatifida Ruiz & Pav. – Argentinian biddy-biddy
- Acaena platyacantha Speg.
- Acaena poeppigiana Gay
- Acaena profundeincisa (Bitter) B.H.Macmill.
- Acaena pumila Vahl
- Acaena rorida B.H.Macmill. (North Island)
- Acaena saccaticupula Bitter
- Acaena sarmentosa (Thouars) Carmich.
- Acaena sericea J.Jacq.
- Acaena splendens Hook. & Arn.
- Acaena stangii Christoph.
- Acaena stricta Griseb.
- Acaena subincisa Wedd.
- Acaena tenera Albov – lesser burnet
- Acaena tesca B.H.Macmill. (South Island)
- Acaena torilicarpa Bitter
- Acaena trifida Ruiz & Pav.

== Invasive species ==
Some species have been introduced accidentally to other areas, attached to sheep's wool, and have become invasive species. Acaena novae-zelandiae, one of the bidibids from New Zealand, is the most commonly encountered species in the United Kingdom, where it is often abundant on coastal sand dunes, crowding out native vegetation and creating an often painful nuisance with the barbed burrs. In California, A. pallida, A. novae-zelandiae and A. anserinifolia are considered serious weeds.
