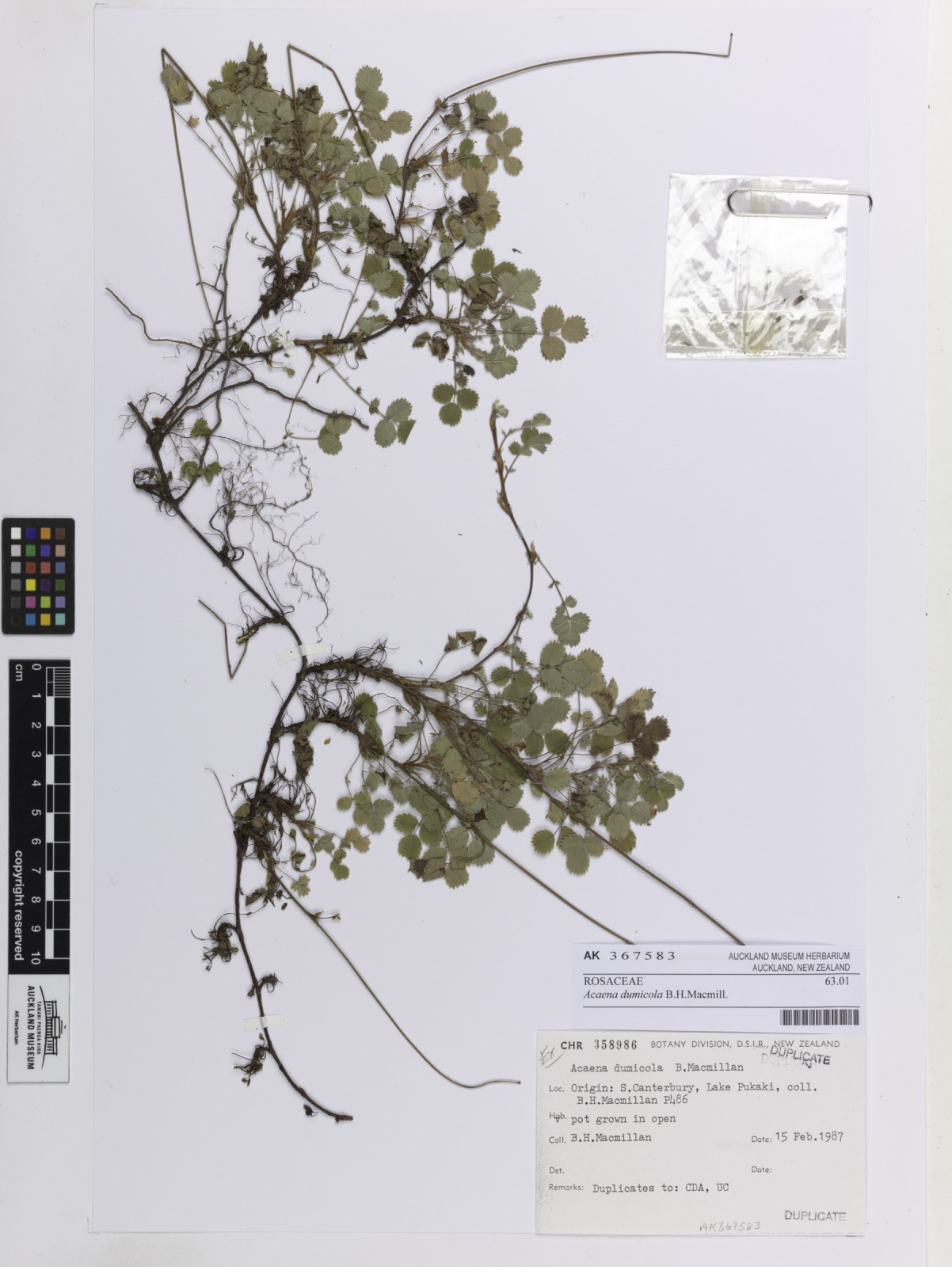

Scientific classification
- Kingdom: Plantae
- Clade: Tracheophytes
- Clade: Angiosperms
- Clade: Eudicots
- Clade: Rosids
- Order: Rosales
- Family: Rosaceae
- Genus: Acaena
- Species: A. dumicola

Binomial name
- Acaena dumicola B.H.Macmill.

= Acaena dumicola =

Species of flowering plant

Acaena dumicola is a species of perennial plant found only in scrubby and rocky habitats at altitudes of between 300 and 1200 m in the South Island of New Zealand.

This is a low plant distinctive for its prostrate branches each ending in three bluish-green leaflets. The margins of these leaflets are minutely toothed, the teeth often being reddish brown. It often grows as a ground cover plant beneath thickets of matagouri (Discaria toumatou). Flowering occurs in November and December with fruit being produced in January. The flower colours are green and white.
