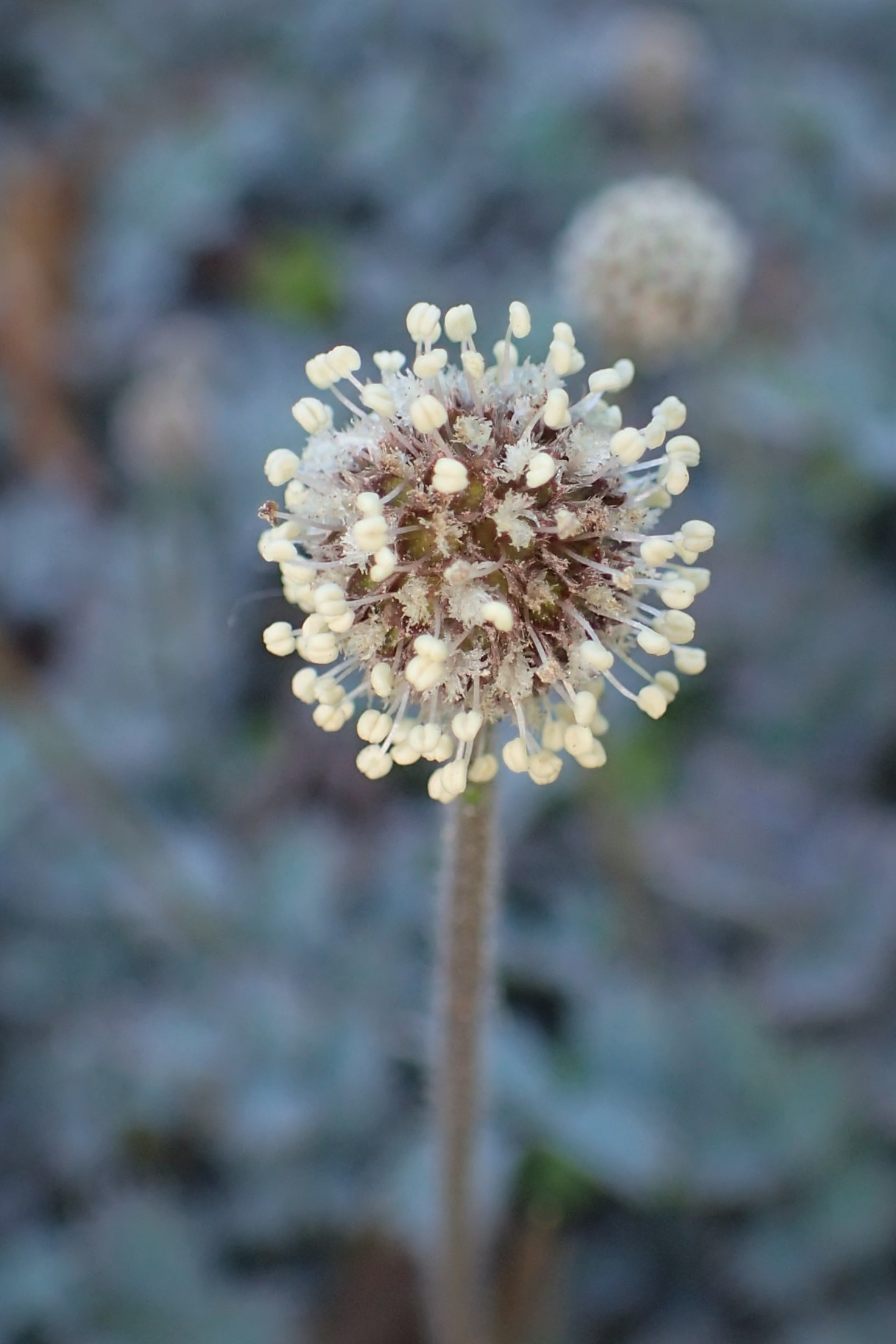

Scientific classification
- Kingdom: Plantae
- Clade: Tracheophytes
- Clade: Angiosperms
- Clade: Eudicots
- Clade: Rosids
- Order: Rosales
- Family: Rosaceae
- Genus: Acaena
- Species: A. caesiiglauca

Binomial name
- Acaena caesiiglauca (Bitter) Bergmans

= Acaena caesiiglauca =

Species of flowering plant

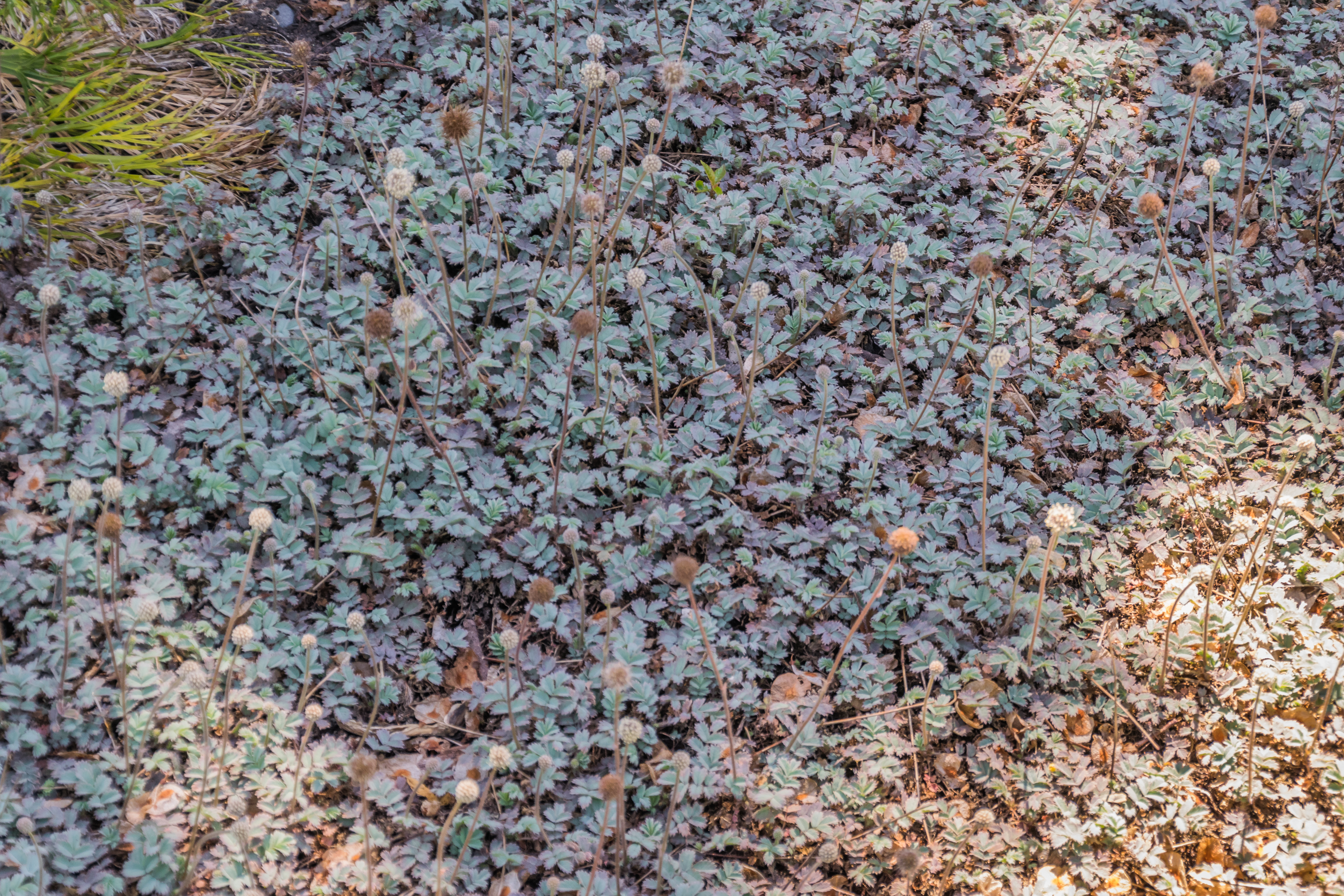
Acaena caesiiglauca in Christchurch Botanic Gardens

Acaena caesiiglauca (common name: bidibid, glaucous pirri-pirri-bur, or silver-leafed New Zealand burr) is a species of Acaena endemic to New Zealand.

== Taxonomy and etymology ==
The species was described in 1988 by C.J. Webb, W.R. Sykes, and P.J. Garnock-Jones. The original combination was Acaena sanguisorbae subsp. caesiiglauca Bitter.

The specific epithet, caesiiglauca, is derived from a combination of Latin meaning ‘lavender blue’ and Greek meaning ‘sea green’.

== Description ==
Aceana caesiiglauca grow to a height of 2–4 inches and a spread of about 2 ft. The flowers consist of reddish burrs and its foliage is described as a silky bluish grey.

== Ecology ==
A. caesiiglauca grows in tussock grassland between 600 and 1500 m. It reproduces by dispersing its hypanthia, which are spiny and attach to animals in its environment. They may also be dispersed by wind or being eaten.

== Distribution ==
A. caesiiglauca grows in the South Island where it is widespread but tends to grow east of the Southern Alps. Herbarium specimens have been collected in Nelson, Canterbury, Otago and Southland.

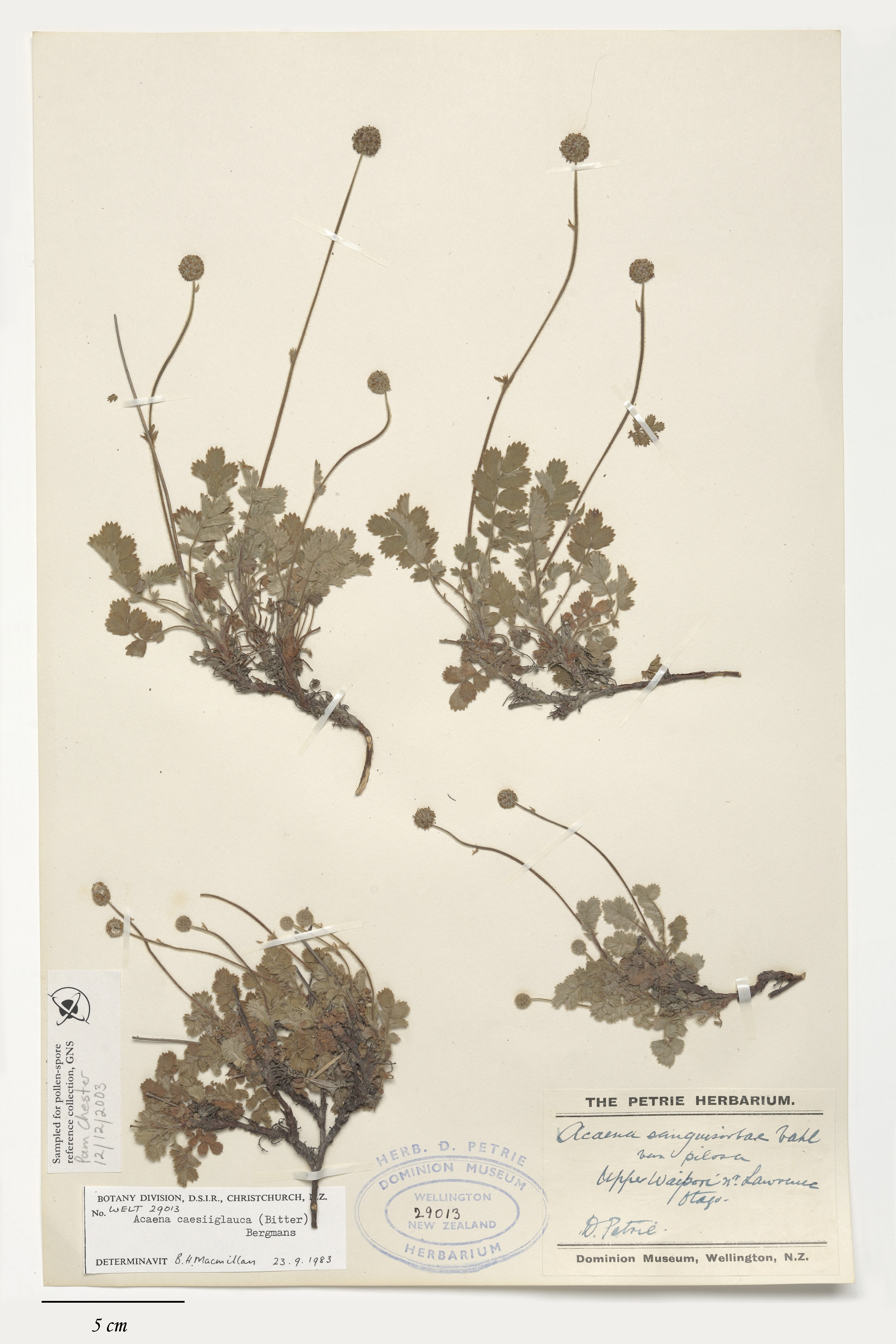
Herbarium sheet of Acaena caesiiglauca specimen
