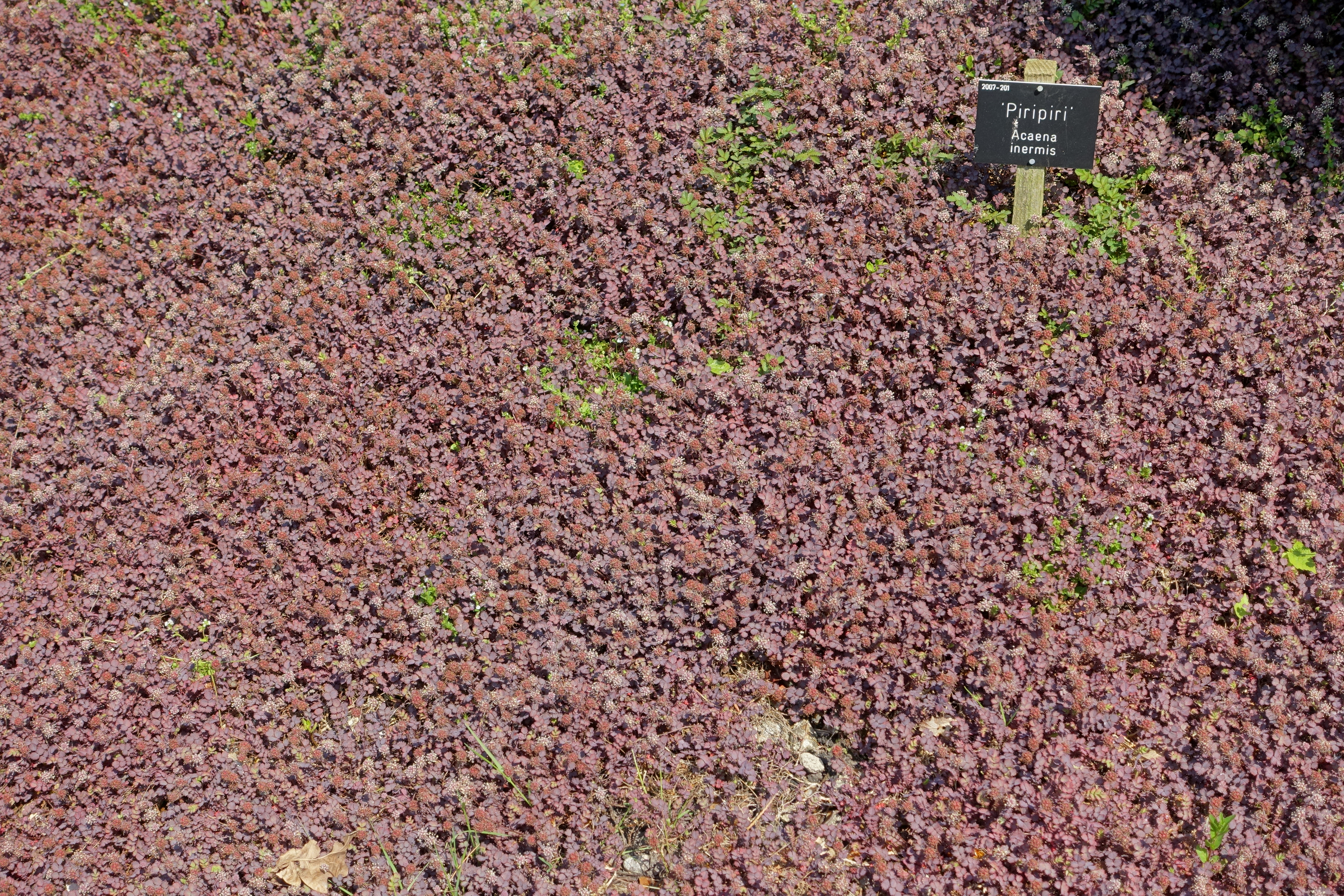
- At Savill Garden
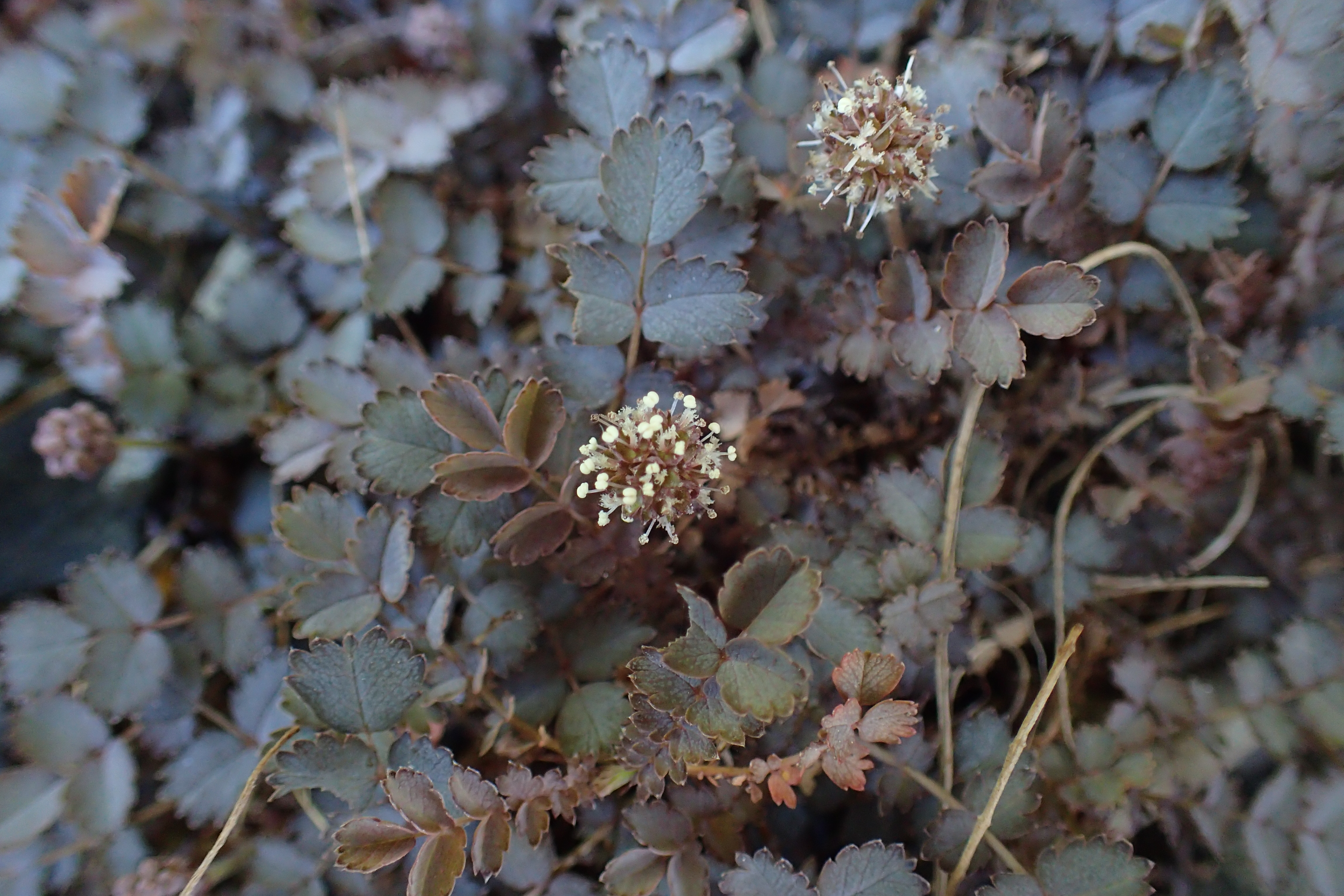
- Flowers

Scientific classification
- Kingdom: Plantae
- Clade: Tracheophytes
- Clade: Angiosperms
- Clade: Eudicots
- Clade: Rosids
- Order: Rosales
- Family: Rosaceae
- Genus: Acaena
- Species: A. inermis

Binomial name
- Acaena inermis Hook.f.

Synonyms
- Acaena microphylla var. inermis (Hook.f.) Kirk

= Acaena inermis =

Species of plant

Acaena inermis, the spineless acaena, is a species of flowering plant in the family Rosaceae, endemic to New Zealand and introduced to Great Britain. Its common names include spineless bidibid and blue mountain bidibid. A mat-forming perennial useful as a ground cover, its cultivar 'Purpurea' is widely available from commercial suppliers.

== Taxonomy and etymology ==
The species was described in 1988 by C.J. Webb, W.R. Sykes, and P.J. Garnock-Jones. Inermis refers to the seedhead not having spines, it being 'unarmed'.
