= Acaena juvenca =

Scientific classification
- Kingdom: Plantae
- Clade: Tracheophytes
- Clade: Angiosperms
- Clade: Eudicots
- Clade: Rosids
- Order: Rosales
- Family: Rosaceae
- Genus: Acaena
- Species: A. juvenca

Binomial name
- Acaena juvenca B.H.Macmill.

Species of flowering plant

Acaena juvenca is a species of perennial plant found in scrubland and forest margins up to an altitude of 1,200 metres (3,900 ft) on the eastern side of both North and South Islands, New Zealand.

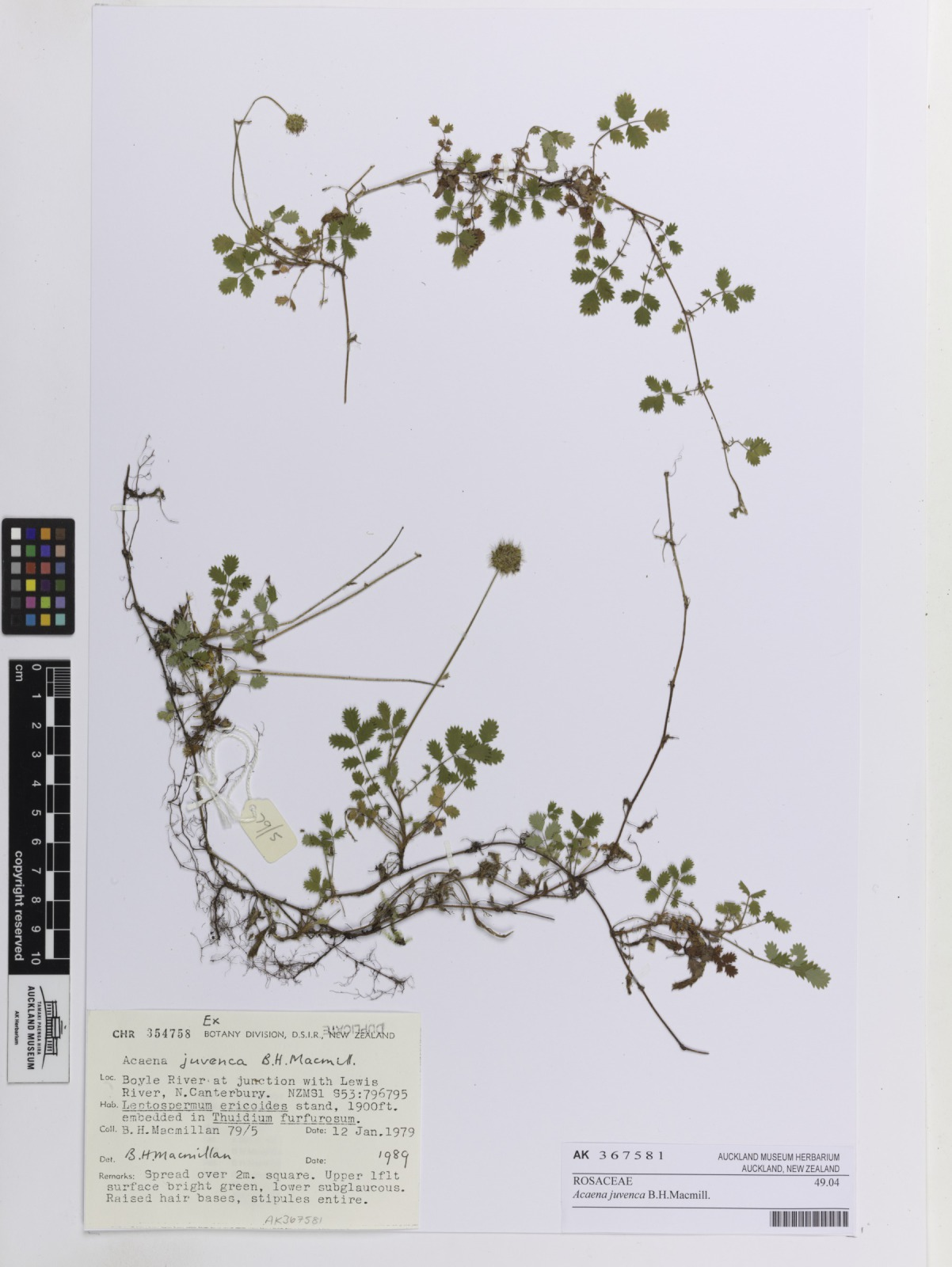
Herbarium specimen of Acaena juvenca

This plant has slender reddish brown branches, often growing prostrately, each ending in three distinctively rounded leaflets which are green, not glaucous as in many of its congeners. This species is usually found at the margins of forests of broad-leaved trees such as Nothofagus and in scrubland dominated by Leptospermum scoparium and Kunzea ericoides. Flowering occurs from November to February with fruit being produced from January onwards. The flowers are white.
