= Poa triodioides =

Scientific classification
- Kingdom: Plantae
- Clade: Tracheophytes
- Clade: Angiosperms
- Clade: Monocots
- Clade: Commelinids
- Order: Poales
- Family: Poaceae
- Subfamily: Pooideae
- Genus: Poa
- Species: P. triodioides

Binomial name
- Poa triodioides (Trin.) Zotov

Synonyms
- Arundo triodioides Trin.; Arundo triticoides Trin., nom. superfl.; Austrofestuca littoralis (Labill.) E.B.Alexeev; Austrofestuca pubinervis (Vickery) B.K.Simon; Austrofestuca triticoides E.B.Alexeev, nom. superfl.; Elymus subpaniculatus Steud.; Festuca littoralis Labill.; Festuca pubinervis Vickery; Festuca triticoides Steud., nom. illeg.; Poa billardierei St.-Yves; Poa littoralis (Labill.) Hook.f., nom. illeg.; Poa pubinervis (Vickery) S.W.L.Jacobs; Schedonorus billardiereanus Nees, nom. superfl.; Schedonorus littoralis var. minor Hook.f.; Schedonorus littoralis var. triticoides Benth., not validly publ.; Schedonorus littoralis (Labill.) P.Beauv.; Triodia billardierei Spreng., nom. superfl.

Species of grass

Poa triodioides, synonyms including Austrofestuca littoralis, is a species of flowering plant in the grass family Poaceae, native to southwestern and southeastern Australia and to New Zealand.

== Taxonomy ==
The species was first described by Jacques Labillardière in 1805 as Festuca littoralis. It was subsequently placed in several other genera. It was first transferred to Poa in 1864 by Joseph Dalton Hooker, but under the illegitimate name Poa littoralis, which had already been used for a different species. It was transferred to Arundo in 1836 by Carl Bernhard von Trinius as Arundo triodioides. (Arundo littoralis had already been used.) A. triodioides was then the basis for the legitimate name in Poa, Poa triodioides, published by Zotov in 1943. In 1976, Evgenii Alexeev placed it in his new genus Austrofestuca, which he had elevated from a section of Festuca, as Austrofestuca littoralis. A. littoralis was at one time the only species in the genus. Austrofestuca has since been treated as a synonym of Poa.
