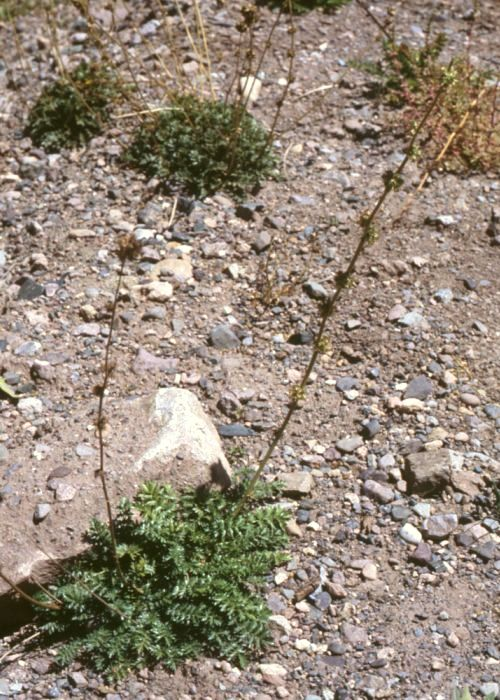
- Acaena pinnatifida foliage and inflorescence

Conservation status
- Unranked (NatureServe)

Scientific classification
- Kingdom: Plantae
- Clade: Tracheophytes
- Clade: Angiosperms
- Clade: Eudicots
- Clade: Rosids
- Order: Rosales
- Family: Rosaceae
- Genus: Acaena
- Species: A. pinnatifida

Binomial name
- Acaena pinnatifida Ruiz & Pav.

Synonyms
- List: Ancistrum pinnatifidum (Ruiz & Pav.) Poir.; Acaena aculeata Meyen; Acaena andicola Gillies ex Walp.; Acaena arthrotricha Bitter; Acaena calcitrapa Phil.; Acaena californica Bitter; Acaena californica var. brevifoliolata Bitter; Acaena californica var. grandis Bitter; Acaena californica var. polyarthrotricha Bitter; Acaena californica var. remotiflorens Bitter; Acaena californica var. subglabriscapa Bitter; Acaena euacantha Phil.; Acaena incisa Lindl.; Acaena leptophylla Phil.; Acaena longifolia Phil.; Acaena lucida Willd. ex Steud.; Acaena montana Phil.; Acaena multifida Hook.f.; Acaena multifida subsp. abavia Bitter; Acaena multifida subsp. alaticonnata Bitter; Acaena multifida subsp. canella Bitter; Acaena multifida var. glaberrima Speg.; Acaena multifida subsp. intercedens Bitter; Acaena multifida var. microphylla Bitter; Acaena multifida var. minor Bitter; Acaena multifida subsp. multiglomerulans Bitter; Acaena multifida subsp. quinquefida Bitter; Acaena multifida var. ramificans Bitter; Acaena multifida var. subexalaris Bitter; Acaena multifida var. utrinquepilosa Bitter; Acaena oligacantha Phil.; Acaena pectinata C.Presl; Acaena pinnatifida var. aconcaguensis Bitter; Acaena pinnatifida subsp. aculeata (Meyen) Bitter; Acaena pinnatifida var. aculeata (Meyen) Reiche; Acaena pinnatifida subsp. brevispica Bitter; Acaena pinnatifida var. calcitrapa (Phil.) Reiche; Acaena pinnatifida var. californica (Bitter) Jeps.; Acaena pinnatifida var. depauperata Bitter; Acaena pinnatifida var. elatior Bitter; Acaena pinnatifida var. eucantha (Phil.) Reiche; Acaena pinnatifida var. glabrata Speg.; Acaena pinnatifida var. glabricupula Bitter; Acaena pinnatifida var. gracilescens Bitter; Acaena pinnatifida subsp. grandiflora Bitter; Acaena pinnatifida subsp. heterotricha Bitter; Acaena pinnatifida var. humilior Bitter; Acaena pinnatifida subsp. hypoleuca Bitter; Acaena pinnatifida var. intermedia Bitter; Acaena pinnatifida var. leptophylla (Phil.) Reiche; Acaena pinnatifida subsp. liocarpa Bitter; Acaena pinnatifida var. longifolia (Phil.) Reiche; Acaena pinnatifida subsp. longifolia (Phil.) Bitter; Acaena pinnatifida var. longiuscula Bitter; Acaena pinnatifida var. macrura Bitter; Acaena pinnatifida subsp. mansoensis Bitter; Acaena pinnatifida subsp. membranacea Bitter; Acaena pinnatifida subsp. mollis Bitter; Acaena pinnatifida var. montana Reiche; Acaena pinnatifida subsp. nudiscapa Bitter; Acaena pinnatifida var. oligacantha (Phil.) Reiche; Acaena pinnatifida subsp. oligacantha (Phil.) Bitter; Acaena pinnatifida var. pallidiflora Bitter; Acaena pinnatifida var. parvifrons Bitter; Acaena pinnatifida subsp. pliacantha Bitter; Acaena pinnatifida subsp. tomentellicupula Bitter; Acaena pinnatifida var. uspallatensis Bitter

= Acaena pinnatifida =

Species of flowering plant

Acaena pinnatifida is a species of flowering plant in the family Rosaceae. It is known by the common names Argentinian biddy-biddy and California sheepbur. It grows in California (United States), Argentina and Chile. The population from California is sometimes considered to be a distinct species or variety from the population in South America.

== Distribution and habitat ==
Acaena pinnatifida is known from California (in the United States), and in South America (Chile to Argentina). In North America, the species grows on roadsides, sand dunes, rocky slopes and coastal grasslands.

== Taxonomy ==
Acaena pinnatifida was first formally named and described in 1798 by Hipólito Ruiz López and José Antonio Pavón (Spanish botanists) in the Flora Peruviana, et Chilensis journal.

=== Etymology ===
In English, Acaena pinnatifida is commonly known as the Argentinian biddy-biddy and as the California sheepbur.

=== Varieties ===
Acaena pinnatifida is often discussed as consisting of distinct varieties. These include the following:

- Acaeana pinnatifida var. californica, which is endemic to coastal scrub areas and open rocky slopes in California. It is a perennial herb that flowers between March and May. It can be found at elevations ranging from 50–400 m (160–1,310 ft). This variety has also been treated by some authorities as a distinct species (Acaena californica).
