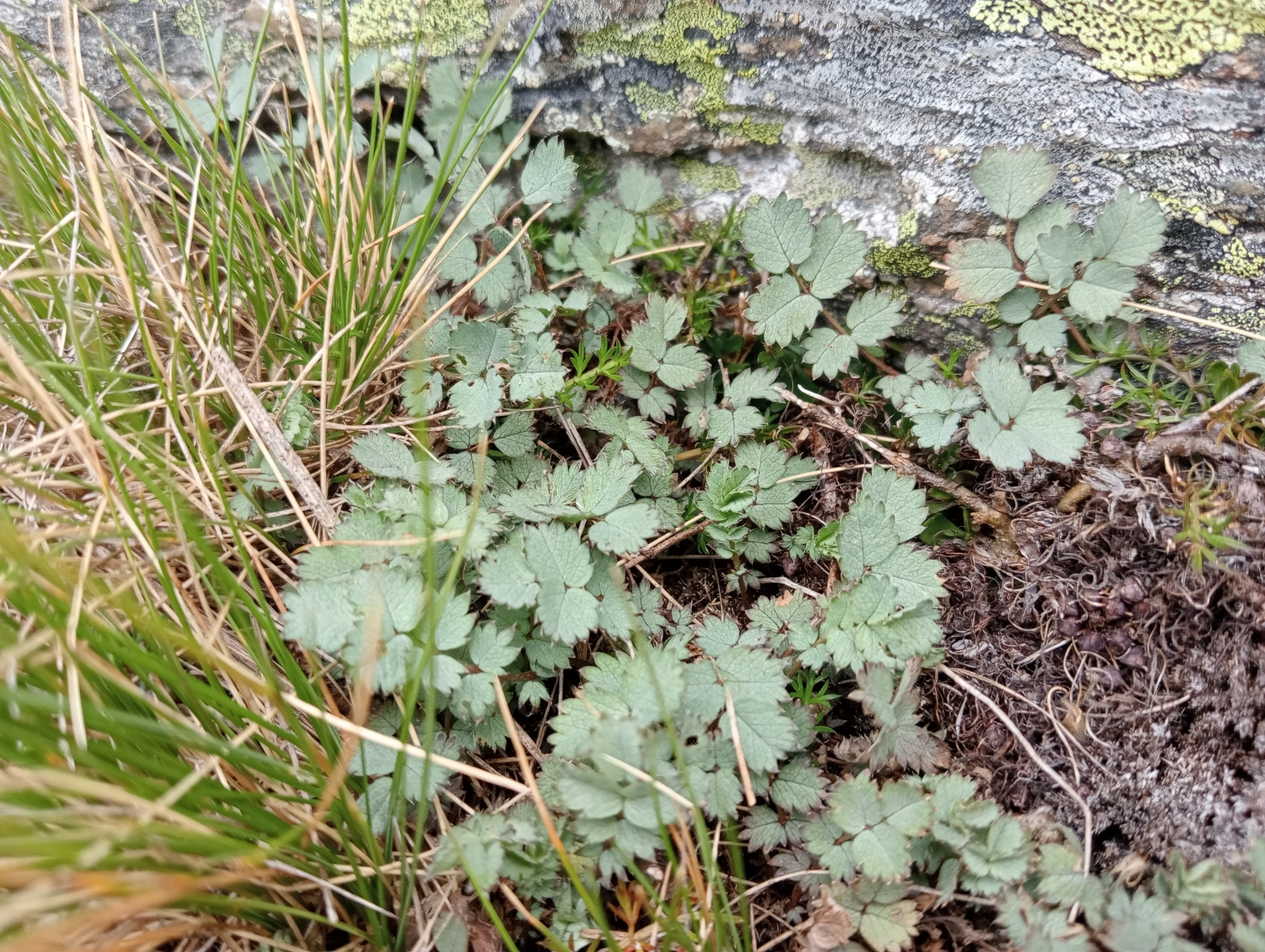

Scientific classification
- Kingdom: Plantae
- Clade: Embryophytes
- Clade: Tracheophytes
- Clade: Angiosperms
- Clade: Eudicots
- Clade: Rosids
- Order: Rosales
- Family: Rosaceae
- Genus: Acaena
- Species: A. tesca

Binomial name
- Acaena tesca B.H.Macmill.

= Acaena tesca =

Species of flowering plant

Acaena tesca is a species of low growing perennial plant restricted to the upper slopes of the mountains of central Otago and northern Southland in the South Island of New Zealand.

This plant spreads using subterranean stems and forms mats in suitable areas. Its habitat is among the high, bleak tussock grasslands of central South Island, growing between tussocks and around rock outcrops. It can be distinguished from its closest congeners by the glaucous leaves with red teeth and its spreading, mat-forming (rather than compact) habit. Flowering occurs in January with fruit being produced in February and March.

== Conservation status ==
In 2018, it was classified as "Not Threatened" under the New Zealand Threat Classification System.
