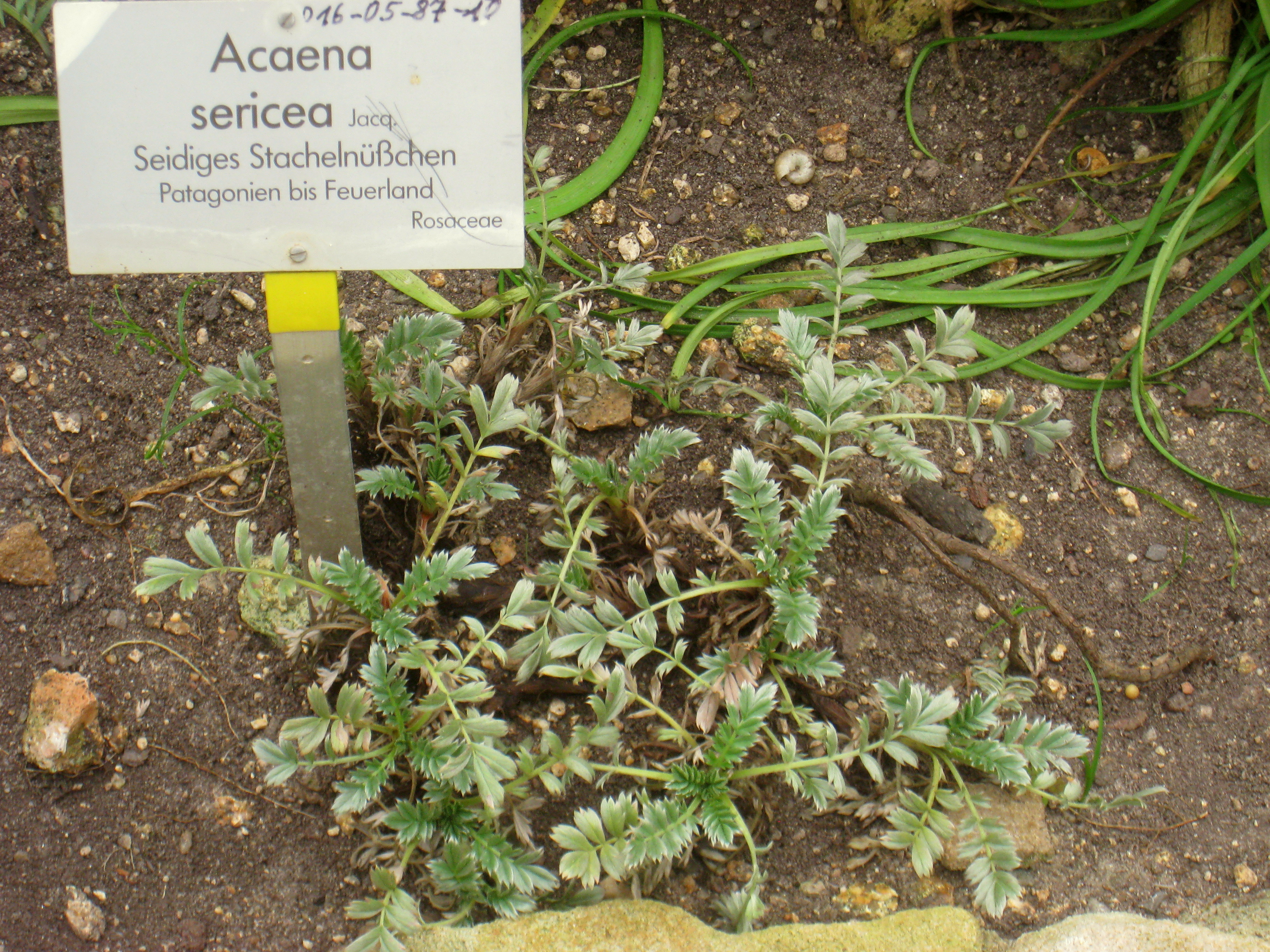

Scientific classification
- Kingdom: Plantae
- Clade: Embryophytes
- Clade: Tracheophytes
- Clade: Angiosperms
- Clade: Eudicots
- Clade: Rosids
- Order: Rosales
- Family: Rosaceae
- Genus: Acaena
- Species: A. sericea

Binomial name
- Acaena sericea J.Jacq.

= Acaena sericea =

Species of flowering plant

Acaena sericea is a species of low growing perennial plant native to southern Chile and Patagonia.
