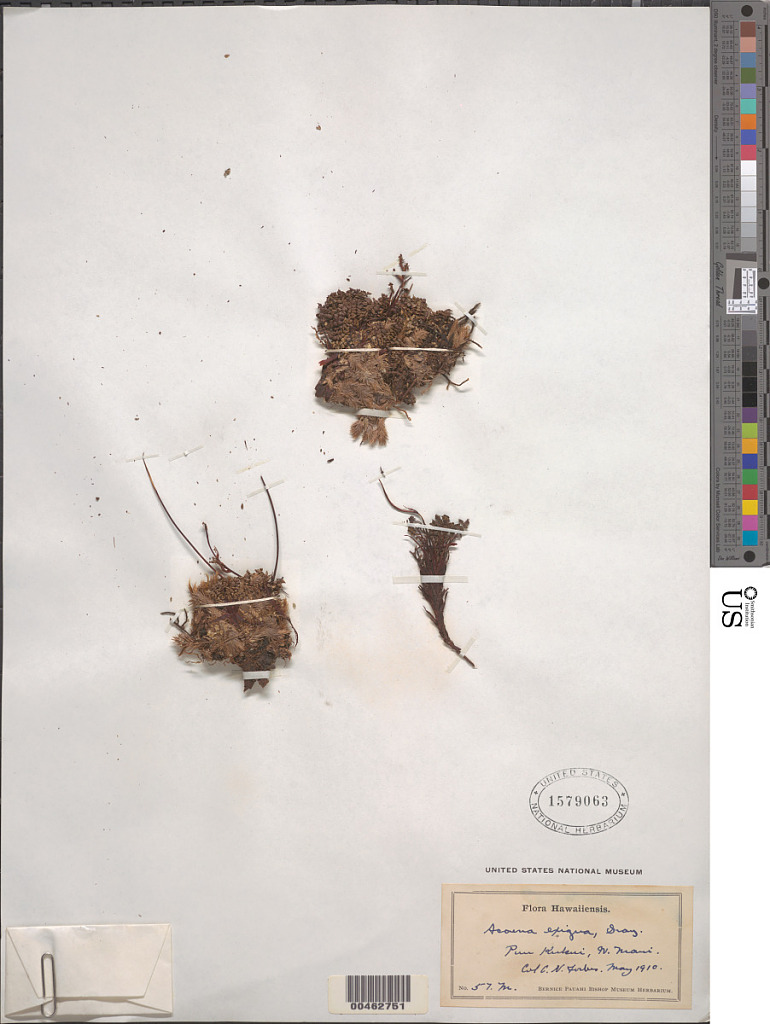

Conservation status
- Extinct (yes) (IUCN 3.1)

- Critically Imperiled (NatureServe)

Scientific classification
- Kingdom: Plantae
- Clade: Tracheophytes
- Clade: Angiosperms
- Clade: Eudicots
- Clade: Rosids
- Order: Rosales
- Family: Rosaceae
- Genus: Acaena
- Species: †A. exigua

Binomial name
- †Acaena exigua A.Gray

= Acaena exigua =

Species of plant

Acaena exigua is an extinct species of flowering plant in the rose family known by the common name liliwai. It was endemic to Hawaii, where it was known from Kauaʻi and west Maui. It had not been seen or collected since 1957 and was feared extinct until 1997, when one plant was discovered in a remote montane bog on Maui. The plant died in 2000, and the species is now considered extinct.

== Reason for extinction ==
The reason for extinction is unknown. While it has been ascribed to rooting by pigs, feral populations have only been present in the vicinity of the population on Kauaʻi for some twenty years, and West Maui is pig-free.
