= Acaena alpina =

Scientific classification
- Kingdom: Plantae
- Clade: Tracheophytes
- Clade: Angiosperms
- Clade: Eudicots
- Clade: Rosids
- Order: Rosales
- Family: Rosaceae
- Genus: Acaena
- Species: A. alpina

Binomial name
- Acaena alpina Poepp. ex Walp.

Species of perennial shrub

Acaena alpina is a perennial shrub of the genus Acaena known for its hardiness and durability. A. alpina is found throughout central Chile and Argentina. It can withstand a wide range of climates, including that of the Andes, where it is commonly found. A. alpina can withstand both hot and cold temperatures as well as wet and dry seasons, though it preferentially grows at high altitudes. A. alpina was originally typified by Eduard Friedrich Poeppig and Wilhelm Gerhard Walpers in 1843.

== Habitat and distribution ==
The administrative divisions of Chile. A. alpina is found between the regions of Valparaíso to La Araucanía.

Acaena alpina is a shrub found along the mountain ranges of South America. A. alpina is mainly distributed throughout Chile and Argentina, specifically along the Andes mountain range. This organism is also found along vegetation belts in South America, specifically along the 33rd parallel south and most commonly at an elevation of 2100 m to 2500 m.

In Chile, the range of A. alpina spans Regions Five through Nine, from north Valparaíso to south La Araucanía. The geographical area covered by these regions experiences temperatures from 8 °C, in the winter months, to 23 °C, in the summer months. Annual precipitation across these regions ranges from 0 mm rainfall per month to 239 mm rainfall per month. A. alpina is found at high elevations within the alpine tundra biome of the Andes Mountains, which is characterized by the absence of trees and a monthly mean temperature that does not exceed 10 °C, according to the Köppen climate classification. In addition to harsh climate conditions, A. alpina inhabits inceptisolic soils that have a stony composition and little organic matter in the Andes highlands.

== Description ==
Acaena alpina grows vertically from an underground rhizome root structure. Outgrowths can reach heights of 8 cm to 30 cm. Suberect stems of A. alpina extend from the rhizome, separated by short internodal regions, and produce numerous petioles which bear 2 to 3 pairs of terminal leaflets. The rachis of the petioles are very small and the 1st and 2nd pairs of leaflets are separated by less than 2 mm, giving the leaflets a pseudo-palmate appearance. The leaflets of A. alpina grow to be 2 cm to 7 cm long and adopt an obovate-lanceolate shape. A. alpina contains leaf sheaths extending the length of the petiole that have sericeous outer surfaces and glabrous inner surfaces. Stipular outgrowths at the base of the leaflets are absent.

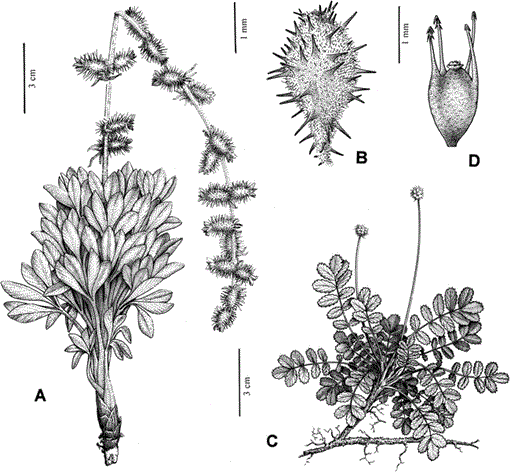
A. Habit of Acaena alpina. B. Burr of Acaena alpina.

=== Flowers ===
Stems of Acaena alpina may extend a peduncle up to 27 cm long. The length of the peduncle is covered in fine white trichomes and supports between 6-10 globose inflorescences, which can bear fruit from November to April. The inflorescences have basal bracts which are linear-lanceolate in shape. The ovoid-oblong burr of the inflorescence grows to be 7 mm to 15 mm in length. The burr is covered in fine white trichomes and is decorated with soft red-brown spines 2 m to 7 mm long. These spines may catch passing animals to increase the dispersal range of A. alpina. The sepals of the inflorescence are ovate-oblong and grow to be 4 mm to 5 mm long. The inner surface of the sepal is glabrous while the outer surface is sericeous.

== Uses ==
Acaena alpina and various other species belonging to the genus Acaena are known as "cepacaballo" or "cadillo" in Chile. A. alpina is edible. Furthermore, many species of the Acaena genus are purported to have medicinal properties. For example, Acaena splendens is often used to treat fever and inflammation.
