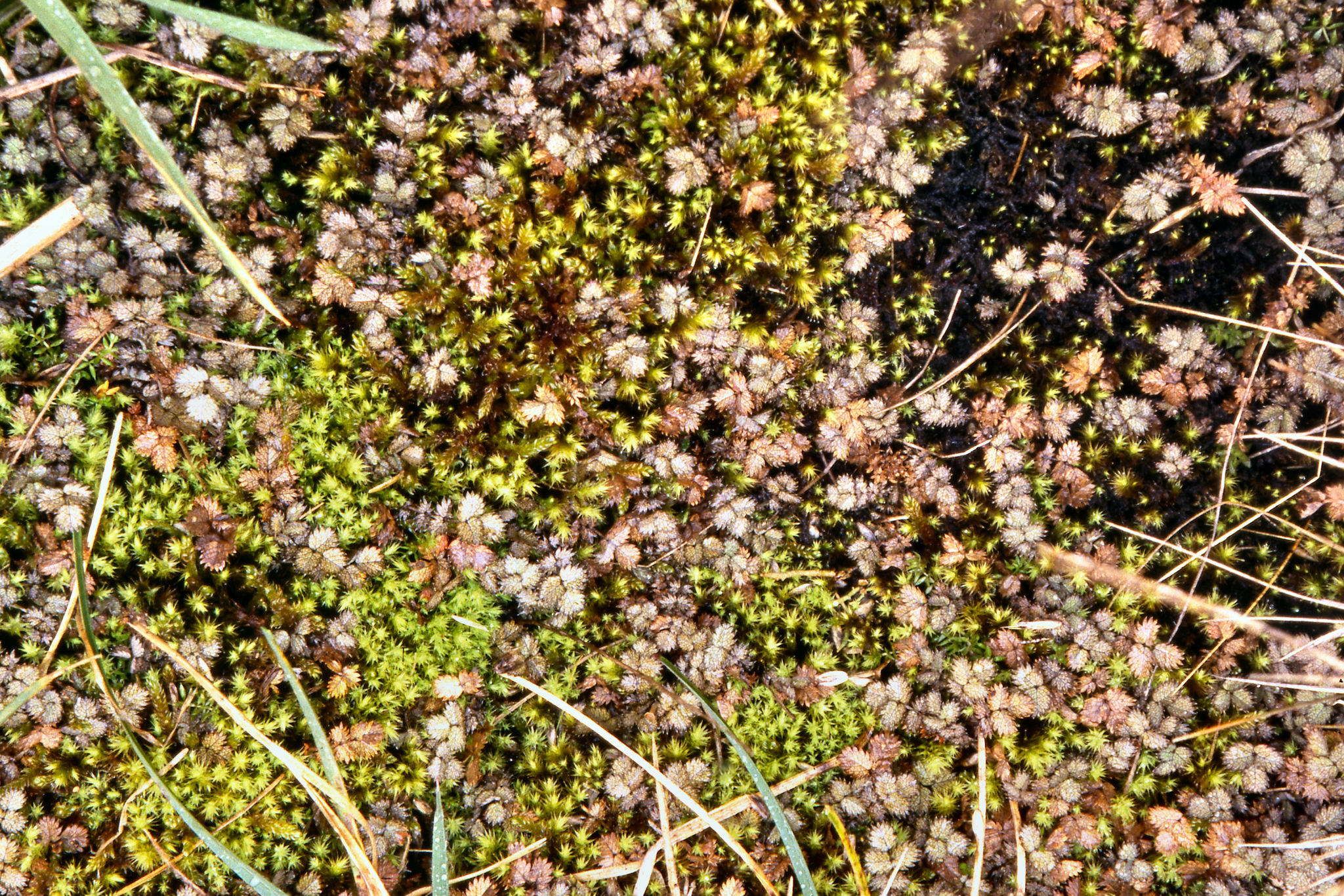

Conservation status
- Nationally Critical (NZ TCS)

Scientific classification
- Kingdom: Plantae
- Clade: Tracheophytes
- Clade: Angiosperms
- Clade: Eudicots
- Clade: Rosids
- Order: Rosales
- Family: Rosaceae
- Genus: Acaena
- Species: A. rorida

Binomial name
- Acaena rorida B.H.Macmill.

= Acaena rorida =

Species of plant

Acaena rorida is an endemic species of mat-forming perennial plant known only from grassy uplands on the Mangaohane Plateau in the northwestern part of the Ruahine Range in the North Island of New Zealand.

Within its range, this plant occurs in areas with moist, stable soils such as in hollows in tussocklands and the floors of ravines. It can be distinguished from its closest congeners by the purple or dull green (rather than bright green) foliage and the sessile fruits which are often hidden among the leaves rather than being borne above. Flowering occurs in December and January with fruit being produced in February. The colour of its flower is white.

== Conservation status ==
This species has the "Nationally Critical" conservation status under the New Zealand Threat Classification System.
