= Evgenii Alexeev =

Soviet botanist

- Евгений Алексеев
- Born: May 13, 1946; Moscow, Russian SFSR, Soviet Union
- Died: April 2, 1987 (aged 40)
- Education: Moscow State University (1972)
- Scientific career
- Fields: Botany

Evgenii Borisovich Alexeev (Russian: Евгений Борисович Алексеев; May 13, 1946 – April 2, 1987) was a Soviet botanist.

== Biography ==
He was born May 13, 1946, in Moscow. In 1965 he joined the Biological Faculty of Moscow State University. In 1967 he took part in the expedition Mescherskaya Botanical Garden of Moscow University.

While at the university he studied the systematics of the family Poaceae. Since 1972 he worked as a researcher at Alekseev MSU Botanical Garden. In 1973, working under Professor Alexey Konstantinovich Skvortsov he defended his PhD thesis, titled "Systematics fescues group Intravaginales Hack. section Festuca European part of Russia and the Caucasus." Subsequently, Alexeev was going to create a monograph of fescues worldwide. According to his requests herbarium specimens were sent to Moscow from London, New York, Paris, Copenhagen, Geneva, Washington and other botanical repositories.

Alexeev did not finish monographic treatment of all kinds of fescue, but published several regional monographs. These include "Fescue Caucasus" (1980) and part of the "Guide to the Plants Meshchora." He was also the author of the translation of the book by Charles Jeffery, "Botanical nomenclature."

As a doctoral dissertation he prepared an iconography of fescues, which remained unfinished.

The standard author abbreviation E.B.Alexeev is used to indicate this person as the author when citing a botanical name.
