= Acaena emittens =

Species of plant

Acaena emittens is a species of perennial plant limited to scrubland and forest clearings at an altitude of 450–1,500 metres (1,480–4,920 feet) in central North Island of New Zealand. This species was first described by Bryony Hope Macmillan in 1989.

Acaena comes from the Greek work akanthos, meaning thorn, because many species have a spiny calyx. Common names for it are bidibid and piripiri.

This plant has slender dark brown branches, growing prostrately, up to 50 cm in length. Each branch ends in three distinctively rounded green leaflets which are hairy but not glaucous as in many of its congeners. This species is usually found within clearings in open forests of Nothofagus and in scrubland dominated by Leptospermum scoparium. Flowering occurs from December to February with fruit being produced from January onwards.

Its flowers, which bloom from December to February, are white; it fruits between January and May.

Field image
