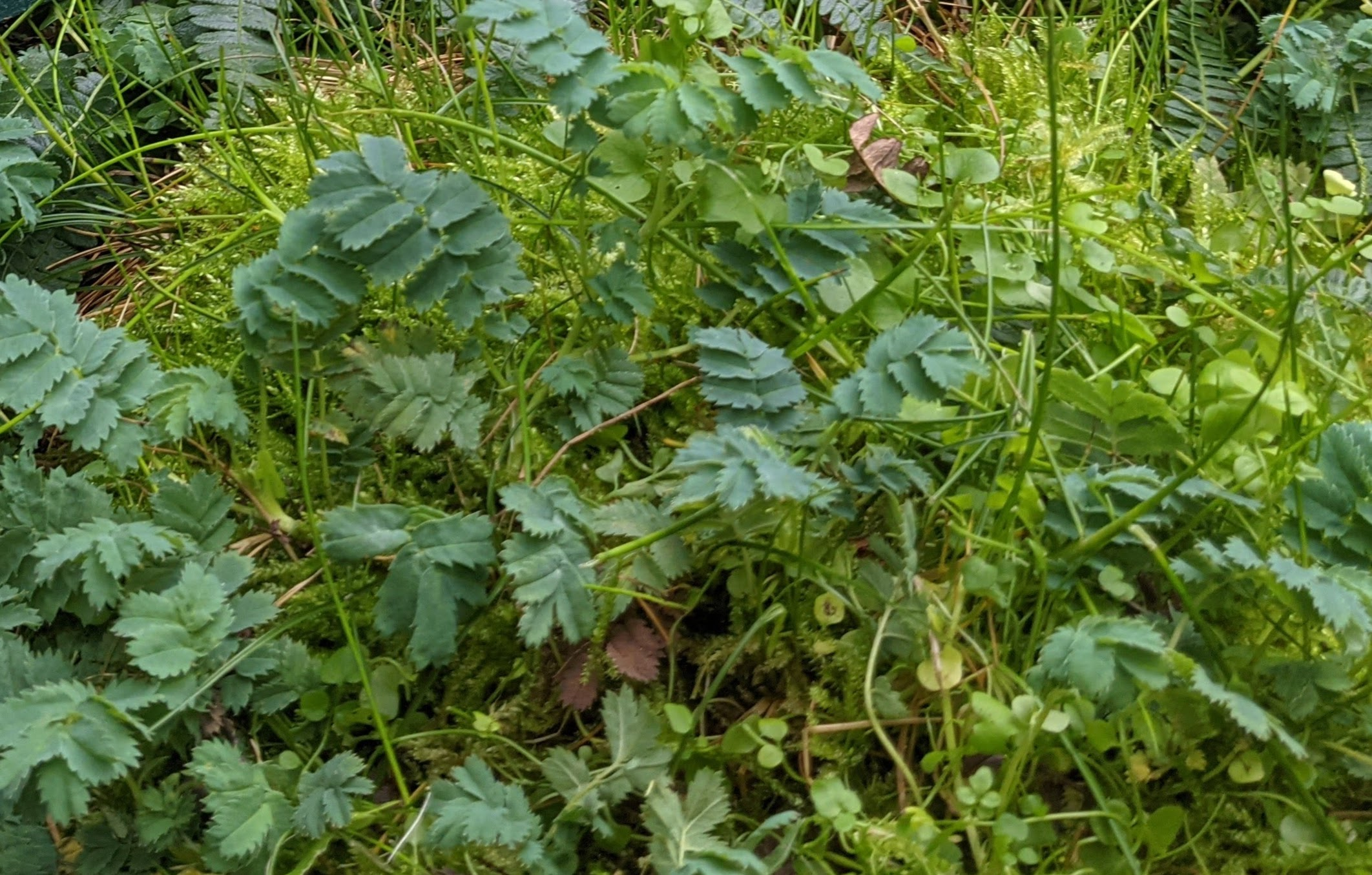
- At the Subantarctic Plant House, in Royal Hobart Botanical Gardens

Scientific classification
- Kingdom: Plantae
- Clade: Embryophytes
- Clade: Tracheophytes
- Clade: Angiosperms
- Clade: Eudicots
- Clade: Rosids
- Order: Rosales
- Family: Rosaceae
- Genus: Acaena
- Species: A. minor

Binomial name
- Acaena minor (Hook.f.) Allan

= Acaena minor =

Species of flowering plant

Acaena minor is a species of flowering plant whose range is confined to Australia's subantarctic Macquarie Island and to New Zealand's Campbell and Auckland Islands in the Southern Ocean.

== Description ==
Acaena minor is a prostrate herb. Its main stems grow to 700 mm long with erect lateral branches up to 50 mm high. The leaves are 15–80 mm long and 10–25 mm wide, glabrous above with long, silky hairs below. The leaflets occur in 6–7 pairs, the lowest very reduced and the others crowded. The inflorescence scape is 30–40 mm long with a head of up to 14 mm in diameter. The flower has two stamens, purple anthers and a white style. The fruiting scape is up to 80 mm long with a head up to 25 mm in diameter.

== Macquarie Island ==
On Macquarie Island the plant is widespread and generally occurs on drier sites than its congener A. magellanica. It flowers from September to January and fruits from January to April.
