= Clonal plant growth forms =

"Guerilla" and "phalanx" are two contrasting growth strategies exhibited by clonal plants. The two strategies are a trade-off in regard to resource allocation between consolidating habitat and expanding to new habitat.

Plants that prioritise longer-distance expansion of stolons and invasion into new habitat over consolidation of close by habitat are said to have a guerilla growth strategy. Infrequent branching and long internodes are traits associated with this strategy. This allows for better sampling across the environment when distribution of good habitat is patchy, and allows plants to escape poor sites and reach favourable ones. It is commonly seen in early-successional species that colonise recently disturbed areas.

Plants that prioritise consolidation of already-occupied habitat over expansion into new areas are said to have a phalanx growth strategy. Frequent branching and short internodes are traits associated with this strategy. A phalanx growth strategy may help plants to tolerate stress within the site they already occupy. When resources are concentrated in a specific microsite, consolidation can help to outcompete other species within this area.
