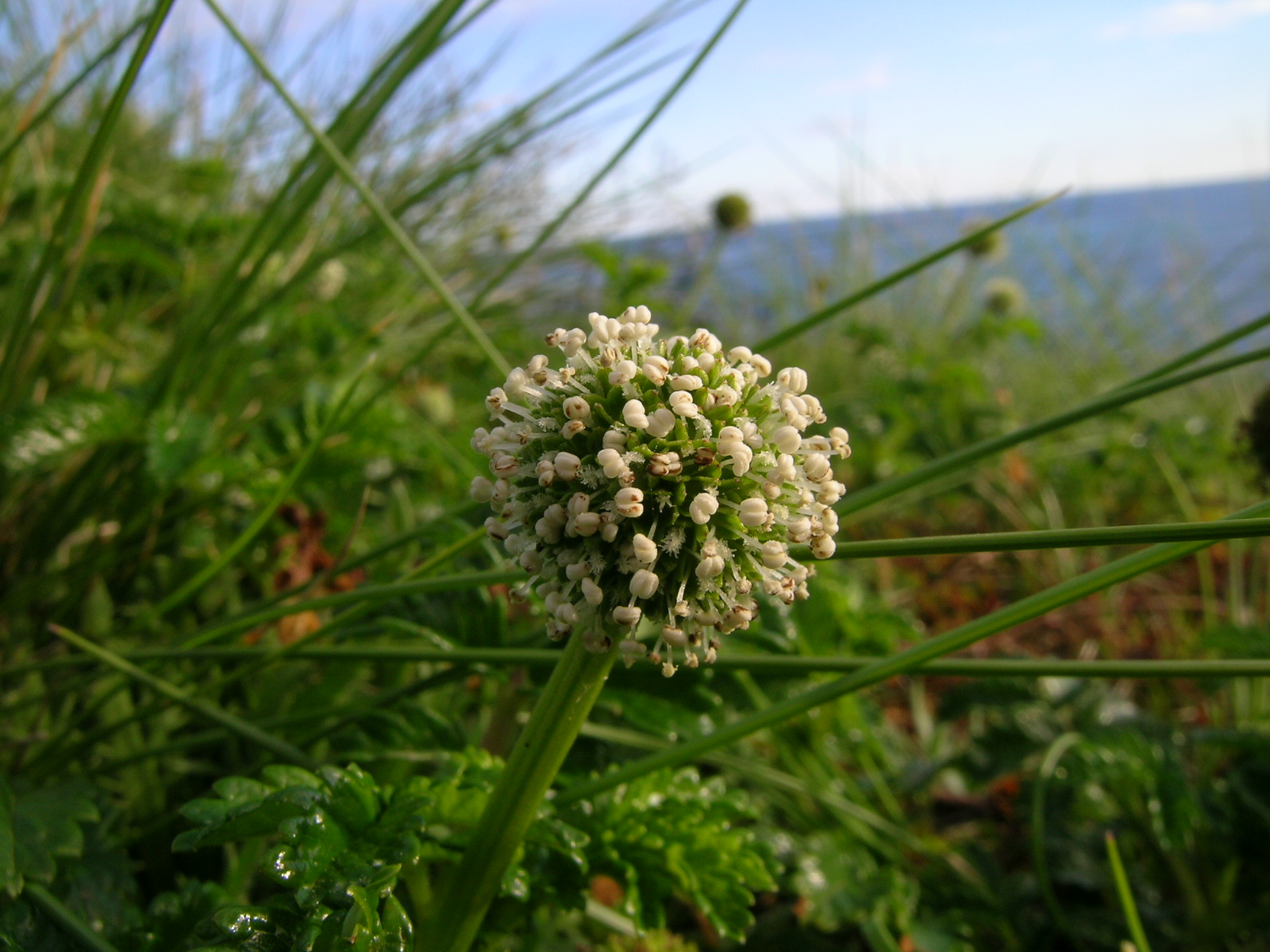

Scientific classification
- Kingdom: Plantae
- Clade: Tracheophytes
- Clade: Angiosperms
- Clade: Eudicots
- Clade: Rosids
- Order: Rosales
- Family: Rosaceae
- Genus: Acaena
- Species: A. novae-zelandiae

Binomial name
- Acaena novae-zelandiae Kirk

= Acaena novae-zelandiae =

Red bidibid

Species of plant

Acaena novae-zelandiae, commonly known as red bidibid, bidgee-widgee, buzzy and piri-piri bur, is a small herbaceous, prostrate perennial, native to New Zealand, Australia and New Guinea, of the family Rosaceae.

== Description ==
Acaena novae-zelandiae is a small herbaceous perennial. It is stoloniferous with prostrate stems of 1.5 – 2 mm diameter. Damage to stolons encourages new shoots to be produced.

It has imparipinnate leaves, with 9–15 toothed, oblong leaflets, which are approximately 2 –11 cm long. The adaxial surface of the leaves is dark green and shiny, and the abaxial surface is hairy and glaucous green in colouration. The rachis of the leaves is often red.

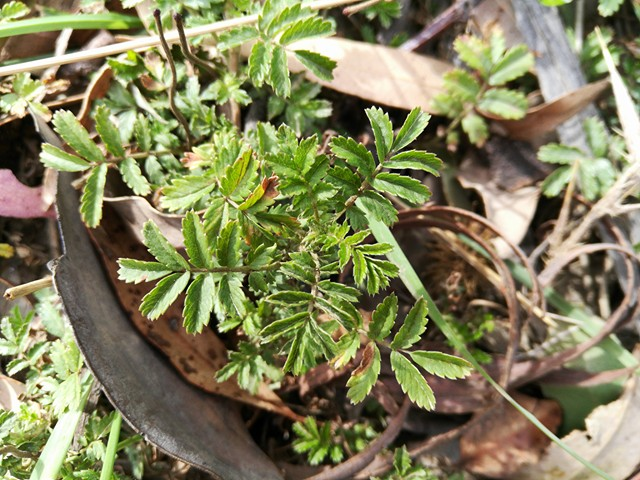
In Tasmania, Australia

The scape is 10 – 15 cm long and bears a globular, terminal inflorescence, of 20 – 25 mm diameter, with 70 – 100 flowers. The flowers lack petals and can range in colour from green to white or purple. The flowers are wind pollinated.

Each flower produces one achene, bearing four approximately 10 mm long spines, tipped with barbs, which aid dispersal by attaching to wool, feathers and various clothing materials. When the fruit are ripe, these spines are red in colouration, later becoming brown.

== Taxonomy and naming ==
Acaena novae-zelandiae was first formally described in 1871 by Thomas Kirk who published the description in Transactions and Proceedings of the New Zealand Institute. The genus name (Acaena) is derived from the Ancient Greek word akaina meaning "thorn" or "spine", referring to the spiny calyx of many species of Acaena. The specific epithet (novae-zelandiae) refers to New Zealand.

== Distribution and habitat ==
Red bidibid is native to New Zealand, Australia and New Guinea. It has also become naturalised in California, Great Britain and Ireland. It is regarded as invasive in Great Britain where it has established itself in places such as dune habitats on Lindisfarne.

It occurs within a wide range of habitats, including woodlands, shrublands and grasslands, from coastal areas to alpine areas. It grows in freely draining soils such as silty and sandy loams, typically on sites which receive a high amount of sunlight.

It also establishes readily on disturbed sites such as roadsides.

== Uses ==
Acaena novae-zelandiae may be used for ground cover in gardens or as a lawn substitute. This plant can be prevented from spreading by limiting disturbance to stolons, thus reducing vegetative propagation, and by mowing flowers before the burrs form.

It has also been suggested that dried "tiny tips" of young succulent leaves may be brewed as tea.

== Gallery ==
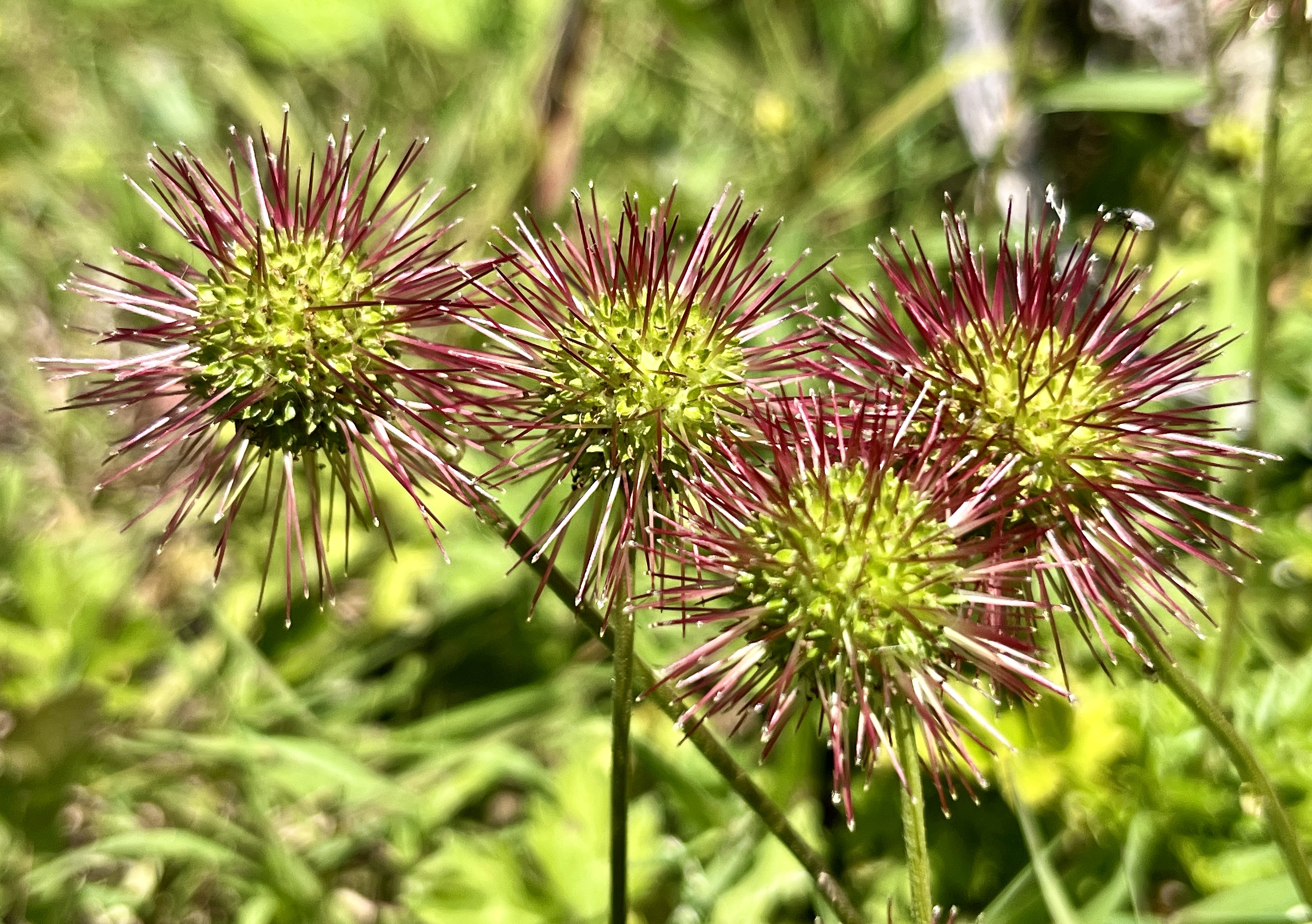
Spines of Acaena novae-zelandiae

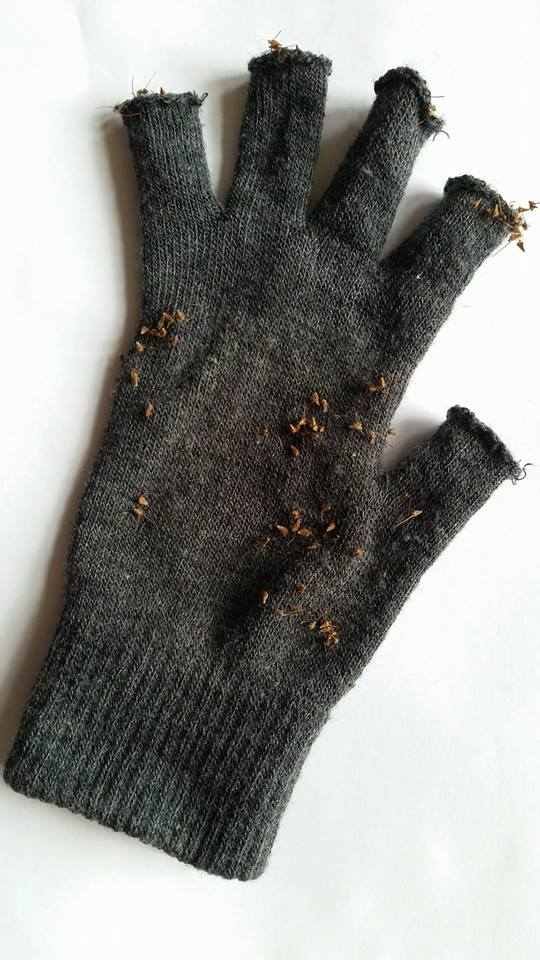
Acaena novae-zelandiae seeds on a glove, demonstrating their ability to attach easily to articles of clothing.
