= Friedrich August Georg Bitter =

German botanist and lichenologist

Friedrich August Georg Bitter (13 August 1873 – 30 July 1927) was a German botanist and lichenologist known for his extensive research into the botanical genus Solanum and for his detailed anatomical and developmental studies of lichens.

== Early life and education ==
Born on 13 August 1873 in Bremen, Germany, Friedrich Bitter was raised in a merchant family known for their strong civic values and commitment to duty. He first attended the Realschule am Doventor, later studying at the Altes Gymnasium in Bremen. In 1893, he began studying natural sciences at the University of Jena, Leipzig University, the Ludwig-Maximilians-Universität München, and Kiel University, obtaining his doctorate from Kiel University in 1897. He subsequently worked at the botanical museum in Berlin and at the biological station in Naples.

== Career ==
In 1899, Bitter became an assistant to Friedrich Wilhelm Zopf at the University of Münster, where he habilitated in 1901. His early career was influenced by instructors Simon Schwendener, Zopf, and Johannes Reinke. In 1905, Bitter was appointed the founding director of the new botanical garden in Bremen (Rhododendron-Park Bremen), established through a private foundation, a position he held until 1923. Despite substantial financial challenges after World War I, Bitter dedicated immense effort to maintaining and developing the garden, establishing plant collections with meticulous accuracy and elevating the garden's scientific reputation.

In 1923, Bitter became a professor of botany at the University of Göttingen, though he continued to oversee and support the Bremen garden remotely. His later years were marked by declining health due to hereditary illness exacerbated by overwork, leading to his death in Göttingen in 1927.

== Research contributions ==
Bitter's botanical contributions spanned broad scientific fields, including plant anatomy, cryptogamic botany, and genetics, though his later focus shifted primarily to plant systematics. His most prominent scientific work revolved around the family Solanaceae, particularly the genus Solanum. Starting from 1910, Bitter undertook exhaustive studies on Solanaceae, traveling extensively across Europe to examine collections and publishing numerous papers documenting new findings and systematically categorizing the family.

Bitter's notable publication, Solana Africana, was a four-part monograph detailing all known African species of Solanum. Additionally, he published observations on steincell concretions in Solanaceae fruits, demonstrating their systematic importance. Although he planned comprehensive monographs, his ambitious studies remained unfinished at his death. Bitter also authored influential studies on the genus Acaena, offering pioneering insights into plant biogeography.

In lichenology, Bitter conducted considerable anatomical research, especially within the subgenus Hypogymnia (since elevated to full genus status) genus Parmelia, exploring morphological variations and ecological adaptations.

== Public engagement and legacy ==
Apart from his academic pursuits, Bitter actively contributed to popularizing botanical knowledge through public lectures, guided botanical tours, and microscopy workshops, fostering scientific interest and botanical education among both the public and teachers in Bremen. The city of Bremen honoured Bitter posthumously by naming a street near the botanical garden as Georg-Bitter-Straße. Species epithets that commemorate Bitter include bitteri and bitteriana.

== Selected works ==
- Zur Morphologie und Systematik von Parmelia, untergattung Hypogymnia, 1901 - Morphology and systematics of Parmelia, subgenus Hypogymnia (now regarded as a genus).
- Die Gattung Acaena, Vorstudien zu einer Monographie, 1911 - The genus Acaena.
- Solana Africana, 1913-1923 (in four parts). Parts I-III, issued in one volume with cover-title only, are reprints from Botanische jahrbücher, bd. 49, 54 and 57, 1913-21; pt. IV, with imprint: Dahlem bei Berlin, Verlag des Repertoriums, is extracted from Repertorium specierum novarum regni vegetabilis, Beihefte, of which it forms bd. 16.
- Solanum morelliforme : eine baumbewohnende Verwandte der Kartoffel : nebst allgemeinen Bemerkungen über die Sektion Tuberarium, 1914.

== See also ==
- Category:Taxa named by Friedrich August Georg Bitter
