= List of the vascular plants of the Falkland Islands =

The flora of the Falkland Islands comprises 178 native species (marked * in the list below), 219 non-native species ('†') and 6 of uncertain status. Thirteen species (marked in bold) are endemic to the islands, and two – Gamochaeta malvinensis and Polystichum mohrioides – are near-endemics, being also found on other nearby islands.

== Ferns and fern allies ==
- Huperzia fuegiana, fir clubmoss*
- Lycopodium confertum, creeping clubmoss*
- Lycopodium magellanicum, common clubmoss*
- Ophioglossum crotalophoroides, adder's-tongue*
- Equisetum arvense, field horsetail†
- Adiantum chilense, maidenhair-fern*
- Asplenium dareoides, spleenwort*
- Asplenium scolopendrium, hart's-tongue fern
- Blechnum magellanicum, tall-fern*
- Blechnum penna-marina, small-fern*
- Botrychium dusenii, Dusen's moonwort*
- Cystopteris fragilis, brittle bladder-fern*
- Dryopteris dilatata, broad buckler-fern†
- Dryopteris filix-mas, male-fern†
- Grammitis poeppigiana, strap-fern*
- Hymenophyllum caespitosum, red-haired filmy-fern*
- Hymenophyllum darwinii, Darwin's filmy-fern*
- Hymenophyllum falklandicum, Falkland filmy-fern*
- Hymenophyllum tortuosum, twisted filmy-fern*
- Hypolepis poeppigii, bramble-fern*
- Parablechnum cordatum, Chilean tall-fern*
- Polystichum mohrioides, shield-fern*
- Rumohra adiantiformis, leathery shield-fern*
- Schizaea fistulosa, comb fern*
- Sticherus cryptocarpa, coral-fern*

== Gymnosperms ==
- Cupressus macrocarpa, Monterey cypress†
- Picea sitchensis, Sitka spruce†
- Pinus contorta, lodgepole pine†
- Pinus echinata, shortleaf pine†
- Pinus muricata, bishop pine†
- Pinus nigra, Austrian pine†
- Pinus radiata, Monterey pine†
- Pinus sylvestris, Scots pine†

== Angiosperms ==
=== Ranunculales ===
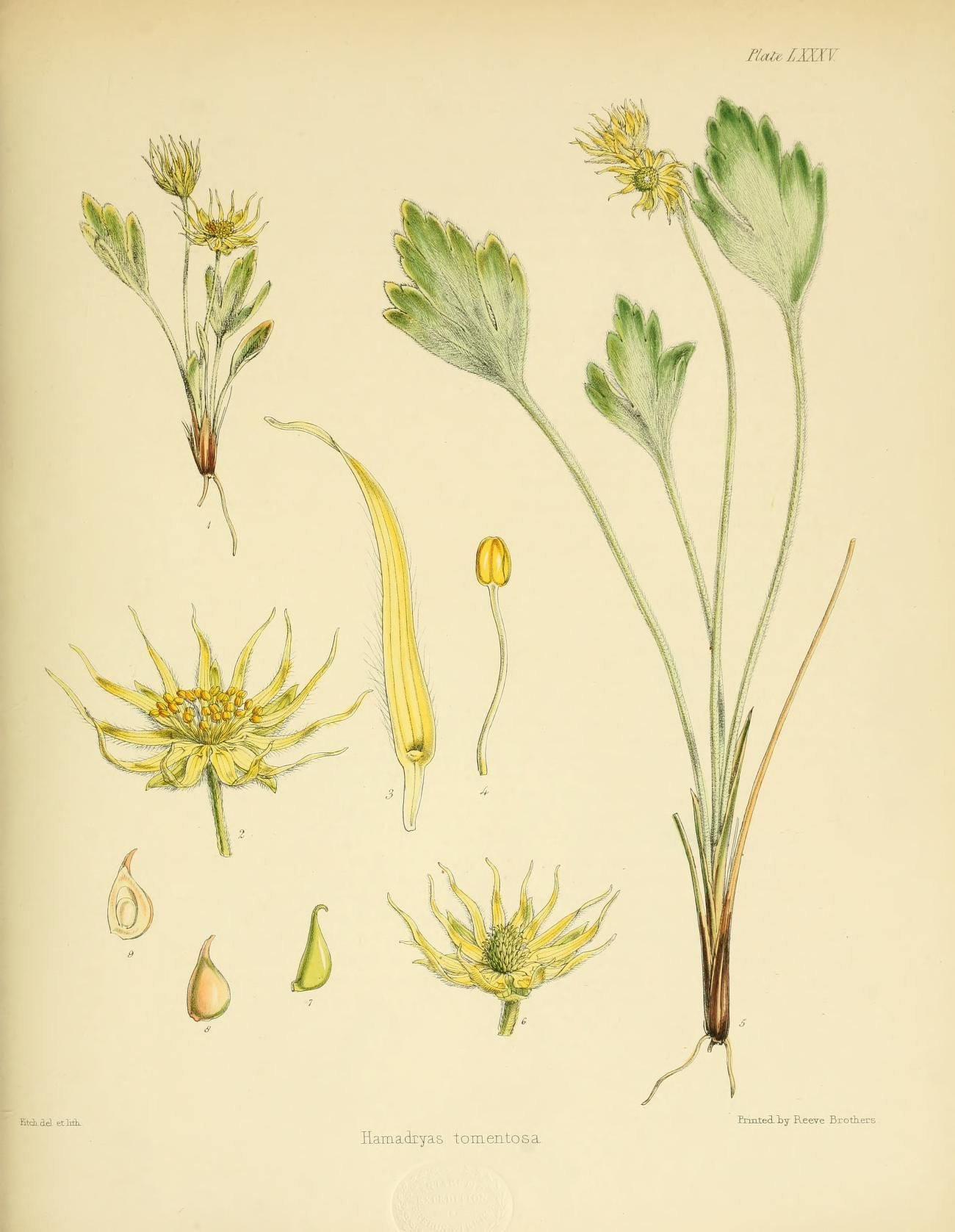
Illustration of Hamadryas argentea, a plant endemic to the Falkland Islands

Berberidaceae

- Berberis microphylla, calafate†

Papaveraceae

- Fumaria muralis, common ramping-fumitory†
- Papaver dubium subsp. dubium, long-headed poppy†
- Papaver dubium subsp. lecoqii, yellow-juiced poppy†

Ranunculaceae

- **Hamadryas argentea, silvery buttercup***
- Psychrophila appendiculata, dwarf marigold*
- Psychrophila sagittata, arrow-leaved marigold*
- Ranunculus acaulis, Skottsberg's buttercup*
- Ranunculus biternatus, Antarctic buttercup*
- Ranunculus hydrophilus, marsh buttercup*
- Ranunculus maclovianus, Falkland buttercup*
- Ranunculus pseudotrullifolius, false ladle-leaved buttercup*
- Ranunculus repens, creeping buttercup†
- Ranunculus sceleratus, celery-leaved buttercup†
- Ranunculus sericocephalus, silky buttercup*
- Ranunculus trullifolius, ladle-leaved buttercup*

=== Gunnerales ===
- Gunnera magellanica, pigvine*

=== Saxifragales ===
Crassulaceae

- Crassula moschata,* stonecrop*
- Sedum acre, biting stonecrop†
- Sedum forsterianum, rock stonecrop†

Grossulariaceae

- Ribes magellanicum, Magellanic currant†
- Ribes nigrum, black currant†
- Ribes rubrum, red currant†
- Ribes uva-crispa, gooseberry†

Haloragaceae

- Myriophyllum quitense, water-milfoil*

Saxifragaceae

- Saxifraga magellanica, saxifrage*
- Saxifraga × urbium, London pride†

=== Fabales ===
- Cytisus scoparius, broom†
- Glycyrrhiza astragalina,†
- Lotus corniculatus, bird's-foot-trefoil†
- Lotus pedunculatus, greater bird's-foot-trefoil†
- Lupinus arboreus, tree lupin†
- Medicago sativa, lucerne†
- Trifolium arvense, hare's-foot clover†
- Trifolium aureum, golden clover†
- Trifolium dubium, lesser trefoil†
- Trifolium fragiferum, strawberry clover†
- Trifolium hybridum, alsike clover†
- Trifolium pratense, red clover†
- Trifolium repens, white clover†
- Trifolium striatum, knotted clover†
- Ulex europaeus, gorse†
- Ulex gallii, western gorse†
- Vicia cracca, tufted vetch†
- Vicia sativa, common vetch†
- Vicia sepium, bush vetch†

=== Rosales ===
Rosaceae

- Acaena antarctica, Antarctic prickly-burr*
- Acaena lucida,* yarrow*
- Acaena magellanica, prickly-burr*
- Acaena ovalifolia, oval-leaved prickly-burr*
- Acaena pumila, dwarf prickly-burr*
- Aphanes arvensis, parsley-piert†
- Malus domestica, apple†
- Potentilla anserina, silverweed†
- Prunus domestica, plum†
- Rosa canina, dog-rose†
- Rosa rubiginosa, sweet-briar†
- Rosa rugosa, Japanese rose†
- Rubus geoides, Falkland strawberry*
- Rubus idaeus, raspberry†
- Sorbus aria, whitebeam†
- Sorbus aucuparia, rowan†

Urticaceae

- Urtica urens, annual stinging-nettle†

=== Fagales ===
- Castanea sativa, sweet chestnut†
- Nothofagus betuloides, southern beech†
- Quercus robur, pedunculate oak†

=== Celastrales ===
- Maytenus magellanica, pickwood†

=== Oxalidales ===
- Oxalis enneaphylla, scurvygrass*

=== Malpighiales ===
Elatinaceae

- Elatine triandra, waterwort*

Euphorbiaceae

- Euphorbia peplus, petty spurge†

Salicaceae

- Populus × canescens, grey poplar†
- Salix cinerea, grey willow†
- Salix gmelinii, Gmelin's willow†
- Salix viminalis, osier†
- Salix × rubra, green-leaved willow†

Violaceae

- Viola arvensis, field pansy†
- Viola maculata, common violet*
- Viola magellanica, Fuegian violet*
- Viola tricolor, heartsease / wild pansy†
- Viola tridentata, mountain violet*
- Viola × wittrockiana, pansy†

=== Geraniales ===
- Erodium cicutarium, common storks-bill†
- Geranium molle, dove's-foot crane's-bill†
- Geranium pusillum, small-flowered crane's-bill†
- Geranium robertianum, herb robert†

=== Myrtales ===
Myrtaceae

- Eucalyptus gunnii, cider gum†
- Myrteola nummularia, teaberry*

Onagraceae

- Epilobium ciliatum, American willowherb†
- Epilobium obscurum, short-fruited willowherb†
- Fuchsia 'Corallina', large-flowered fuchsia†
- Fuchsia magellanica, fuchsia†

=== Malvales ===
- Sidalcea malviflora, Greek mallow†
- Drapetes muscosa, drapetes*

=== Brassicales ===
- Armoracia rusticana, horseradish†
- Brassica napus, swede†
- Brassica oleracea, cabbage†
- Brassica rapa, turnip†
- Capsella bursa-pastoris, shepherd's-purse†
- Cardamine glacialis, bitter-cress*
- Cardamine hirsuta, hairy bitter-cress†
- Cochlearia officinalis, English scurvygrass†
- Draba funiculosa, whitlowgrass*
- Draba magellanica, Fuegian whitlowgrass*
- Erophila verna, introduced whitlowgrass†
- Hesperis matronalis, dame's-violet†
- Lepidium didymum, lesser swine-cress*
- Nasturtium officinale, water-cress†
- **Phlebolobium maclovianum, Falkland rock-cress***

=== Santalales ===
- Nanodea muscosa, foxberry*

=== Caryophyllales ===
Amaranthaceae

- Atriplex patula, common orache†
- Atriplex prostrata, spear-leaved orache†
- Chenopodium macrospermum, goosefoot*
- Suaeda argentinensis, shrubby seablite*

Caryophyllaceae

- Cerastium arvense, field mouse-ear*
- Cerastium fontanum, common mouse-ear†
- Cerastium glomeratum, sticky mouse-ear†
- Colobanthus quitensis, Andean pearlwort*
- Colobanthus subulatus, emerald-bog*
- Sagina filicaulis, annual pearlwort†
- Sagina procumbens, procumbent pearlwort†
- Silene latifolia, white campion†
- Silene uniflora, bladder campion†
- Spergula arvensis, corn spurrey†
- Spergularia marina, lesser sea-spurrey*
- Stellaria alsine, bog stitchwort†
- Stellaria debilis,* stitchwort*
- Stellaria graminea, lesser stitchwort†
- Stellaria media, chickweed†

Droseraceae

- Drosera uniflora, sundew*

Montiaceae

- Calandrinia nitida,*
- Claytonia perfoliata, spring beauty†
- Montia fontana, blinks*

Plumbaginaceae

- Armeria maritima, thrift*

Polygonaceae

- Polygonum aviculare, knotgrass†
- Polygonum maritimum, sea knotgrass*
- Rheum × hybridum, rhubarb†
- Rumex acetosa, sorrel†
- Rumex acetosella subsp. acetosella, sheep's sorrel†
- Rumex acetosella subsp. pyrenaicus, round-seeded sheep's sorrel†
- Rumex crispus, curled dock†
- Rumex hydrolapathum, water dock†
- Rumex longifolius, northern dock†
- Rumex magellanicus, southern dock*
- Rumex obtusifolius, broad-leaved dock†

=== Ericales ===
Ericaceae

- Calluna vulgaris, heather†
- Empetrum rubrum, diddle-dee*
- Gaultheria antarctica, Antarctic mountainberry*
- Gaultheria antarctica × pumila, mountainberry hybrid*
- Gaultheria pumila, mountainberry*

Primulaceae

- Anagallis alternifolia, pimpernel*
- Primula magellanica, dusty miller*
- Samolus repens, shore pimpernel*

=== Gentianales ===
Gentianaceae

- Centaurium pulchellum, lesser centaury†
- Gentianella magellanica, felwort*

Rubiaceae

- Galium antarcticum, Antarctic bedstraw*
- Galium aparine, cleavers†
- Galium saxatile, heath bedstraw†
- Nertera granadensis, beadplant*

=== Boraginaceae ===
- Myosotis arvensis, field forget-me-not†
- Myosotis discolor, changing forget-me-not†
- Myosotis ramosissima, early forget-me-not†

=== Solanales ===
- Solanum tuberosum, potato†

=== Lamiales ===
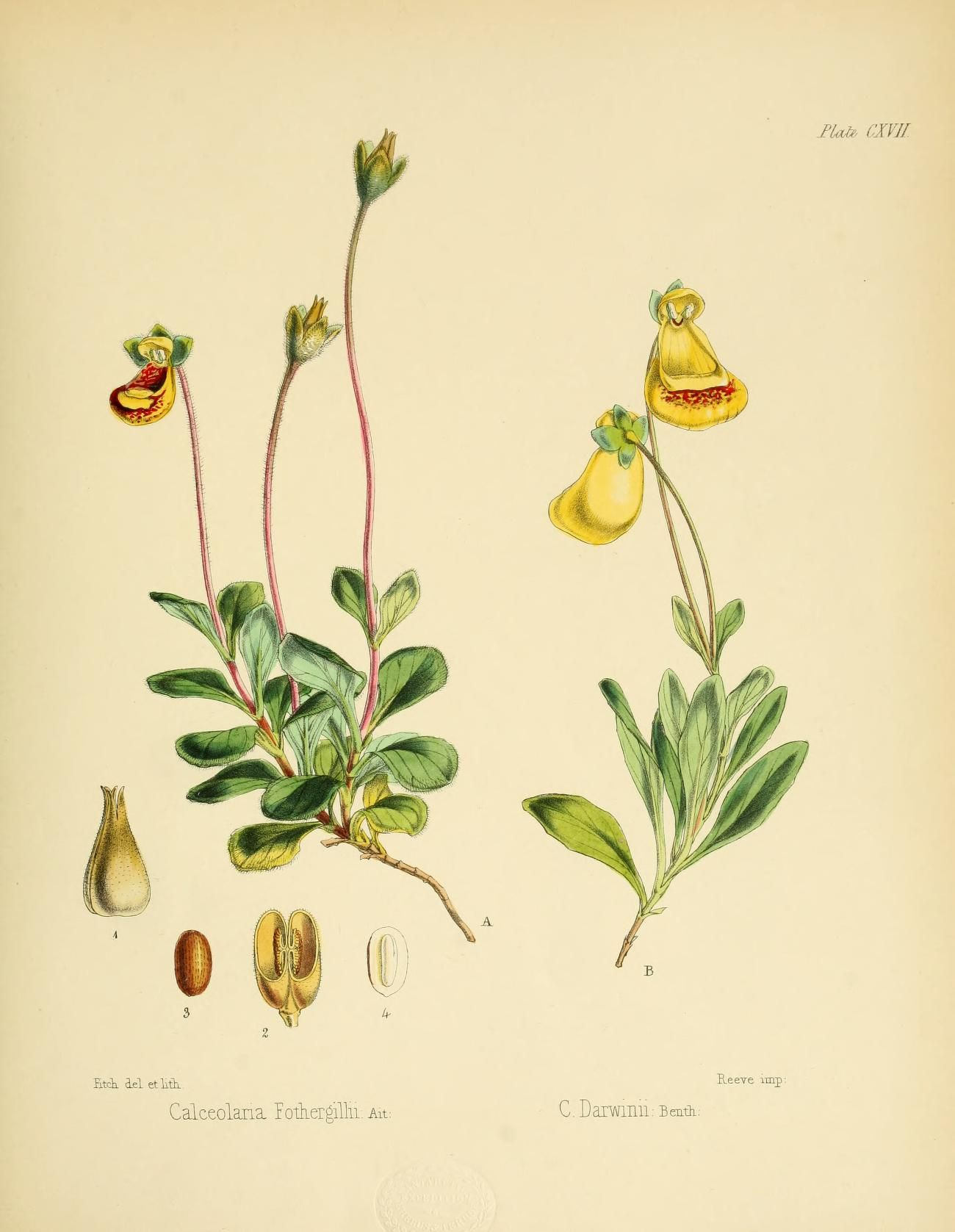
Illustration of Calceolaria fothergilli (left), a plant endemic to the Falkland Islands

Calceolariaceae

- Calceolaria biflora, yellow lady's slipper*
- **Calceolaria fothergillii, lady's slipper***

Callitrichaceae

- Callitriche antarctica, water-starwort*

Lamiaceae

- Lamium amplexicaule, henbit dead-nettle†
- Lamium hybridum, cut-leaved dead-nettle†
- Lamium purpureum, red dead-nettle†
- Mentha spicata, spearmint†
- Mentha × piperita, peppermint†
- Mentha × villosa, apple-mint†
- Prunella vulgaris, selfheal†
- Scutellaria nummulariifolia, skullcap*

Orobanchaceae

- Euphrasia antarctica, eyebright*
- Euphrasia confusa, European eyebright†
- Parentucellia viscosa, yellow bartsia†

Plantaginaceae

- Littorella australis, shoreweed*
- Plantago barbata, thrift plantain*
- Plantago coronopus, buck's-horn plantain†
- Plantago lanceolata, ribwort plantain†
- Plantago major, greater plantain†
- Plantago maritima, sea plantain*
- Plantago media, hoary plantain†
- **Plantago moorei, Moore's plantain***

Scrophulariaceae

- Limosella australis, southern mudwort*

Veronicaceae

- Digitalis purpurea, foxglove†
- Veronica agrestis, green field speedwell†
- Veronica arvensis, wall speedwell†
- Veronica elliptica,* boxwood*
- Veronica officinalis, heath speedwell†
- Veronica serpyllifolia, thyme-leaved speedwell†
- Veronica × franciscana, hybrid boxwood†

=== Asterales ===
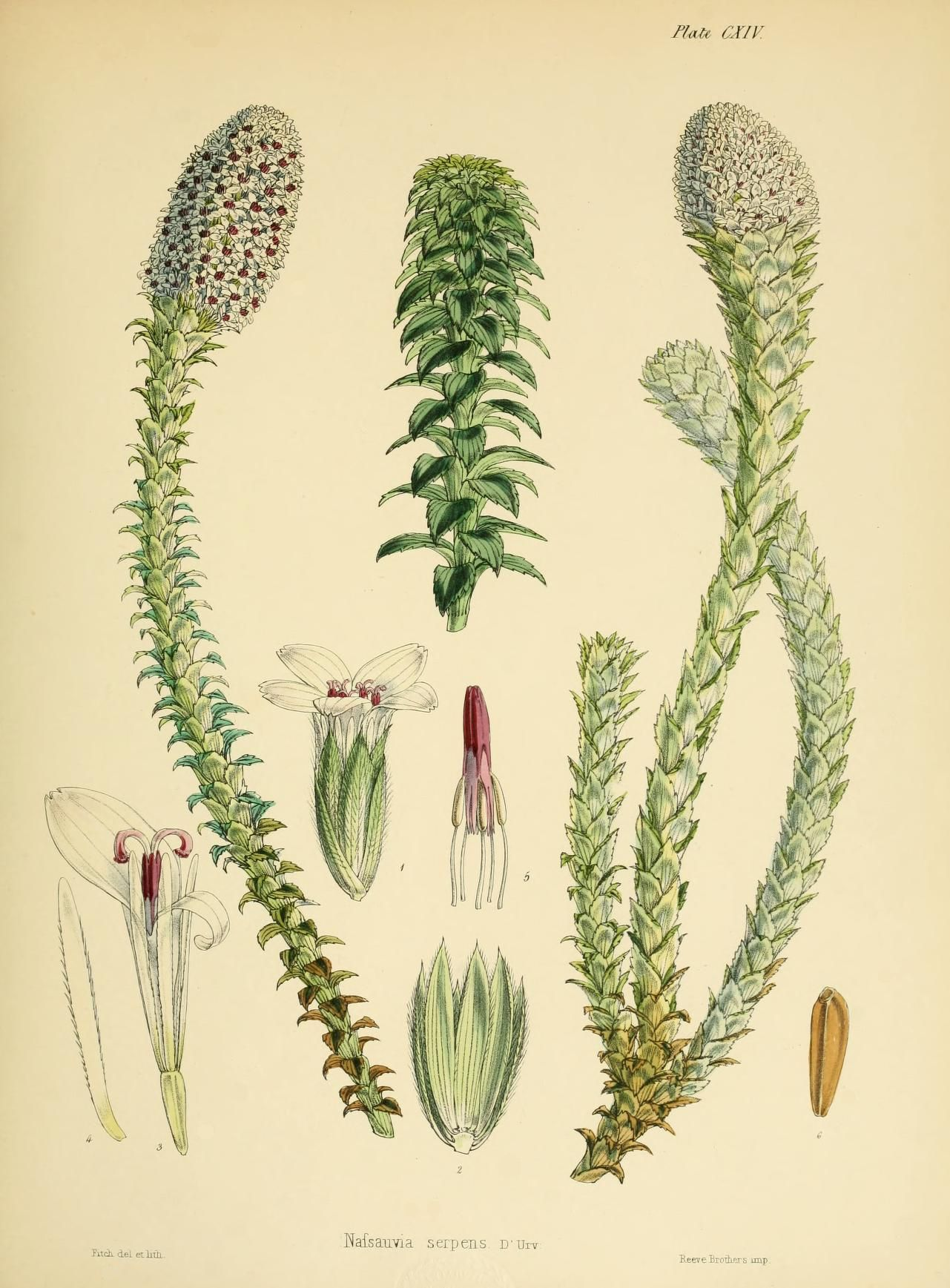
Illustration of Nassauvia serpens, a plant endemic to the Falkland Islands

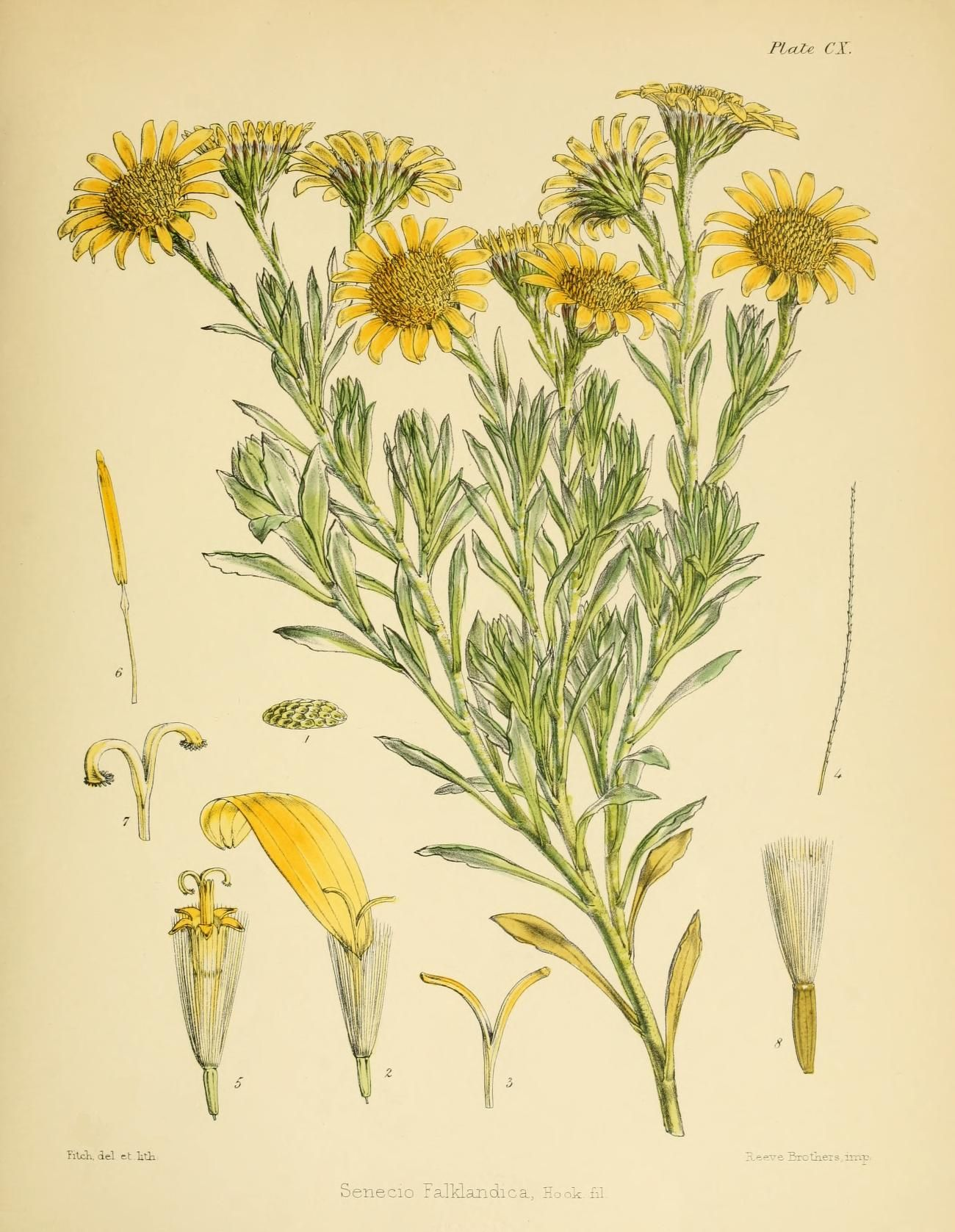
Illustration of Senecio falklandicus, a plant endemic to the Falkland Islands

Asteraceae

- Abrotanella emarginata, notched moss-bog*
- Achillea millefolium, yarrow†
- Agoseris coronopifolium, Fuegian hawks-beard*
- Anthemis punctata, Sicilian chamomile†
- Baccharis magellanica, Christmas-bush*
- Bellis perennis, daisy†
- **Chevreulia lycopodioides, clubmoss cudweed***
- Chiliotrichum diffusum, fachine*
- Cichorium intybus, chicory†
- Cirsium arvense, creeping thistle†
- Cirsium vulgare, spear thistle†
- Crepis capillaris, smooth hawks-beard†
- **Erigeron incertus, hairy daisy***
- Gamochaeta americana, American cudweed*
- **Gamochaeta antarctica, Antarctic cudweed***
- Gamochaeta malvinensis, Falkland cudweed*
- Gamochaeta spiciformis, spiked cudweed*
- Gnaphalium luteoalbum, Jersey cudweed†
- Hieracium antarcticum, Antarctic hawkweed*
- Hieracium patagonicum, Patagonian hawkweed*
- Hypochaeris arenaria, sand cat's-ear*
- Hypochaeris radicata, common cat's-ear†
- Lagenophora nudicaulis, dwarf daisy*
- Leontodon hispidus, rough hawkbit†
- Leptinella scariosa, buttonweed*
- Leucanthemum vulgare, oxeye daisy†
- Leucanthemum × superbum, Shasta daisy†
- **Leucheria suaveolens, vanilla daisy***
- Matricaria discoidea, pineappleweed†
- **Nassauvia gaudichaudii, coastal nassauvia***
- **Nassauvia serpens, snakeplant***
- Perezia recurvata, Falkland lavender*
- Pilosella aurantiaca, orange hawkweed, fox-and-cubs†
- Pilosella officinarum, mouse-ear-hawkweed†
- Senecio candidans, sea cabbage*
- **Senecio falklandicus, woolly Falkland daisy***
- Senecio jacobaea, European ragwort†
- Senecio squalidus, Oxford ragwort†
- Senecio sylvaticus, heath groundsel†
- **Senecio vaginatus, smooth Falkland daisy***
- Senecio vulgaris, groundsel†
- Sonchus asper, prickly sow-thistle†
- Sonchus oleraceus, smooth sow-thistle†
- Symphyotrichum vahlii, marsh daisy*
- Tanacetum parthenium cv. 'Aureum', golden feverfew†
- Tanacetum vulgare, tansy†
- Taraxacum gilliesii, Gillie's dandelion*
- Taraxacum officinale, dandelion†
- Tripleurospermum maritimum, scentless mayweed†
- Tussilago farfara, colt's foot†
- **Nastanthus falklandicus, false-plantain***

Calyceraceae

- Lobelia pratiana, berry-lobelia*

=== Dipsacales ===
Caprifoliaceae

- Lonicera periclymenum, honeysuckle†
- Sambucus nigra cv. 'Marginata', variegated elder†
- Sambucus nigra f. laciniata, cut-leaved elder†
- Sambucus nigra f. nigra, elder†

Valerianaceae

- Valeriana sedifolia, valerian-bog*
- Valerianella locusta, lamb's lettuce†

=== Apiales ===
Apiaceae

- Anthriscus sylvestris, cow parsley†
- Apium australe, wild celery*
- Azorella filamentosa, wiry azorella*
- Azorella lycopodioides, clubmoss azorella*
- Azorella monantha, tufted azorella*
- Azorella selago, cushion azorella*
- Bolax gummifera, balsam-bog*
- Conium maculatum, hemlock†
- Heracleum sphondylium, hogweed†
- Levisticum officinale, lovage†
- Lilaeopsis macloviana, lilaeopsis*
- Oreomyrrhis hookeri, Hooker's sweet cicely*
- Schizeilema ranunculus, buttercup-parsley*

Araliaceae

- Hedera helix, ivy†

Hydrocotylaceae

- Hydrocotyle chamaemorus, marsh pennywort*

=== Alismatales ===
Juncaginaceae

- Tetroncium magellanicum, arrowgrass*

Potamogetonaceae

- Potamogeton linguatus,* pondweed*

Ruppiaceae

- Ruppia filifolia, tasselweed*

=== Liliales ===
Alstroemeriaceae

- Luzuriaga marginata, almond-flower*

Corsiaceae

- Arachnitis uniflora, spider-flower*

=== Asparagales ===
Alliaceae

- Allium schoenoprasum, chives†
- Allium triquetrum, three-cornered garlic†
- Narcissus pseudonarcissus, daffodil – Alliaceae
- Narcissus sp., daffodil†

Asparagaceae

- Hyacinthoides non-scripta, English bluebell†
- Hyacinthoides × massartiana, hybrid bluebell†

Asteliaceae

- Astelia pumila, soft-camp-bog*
- Olsynium filifolium, pale maiden*

Iridaceae

- Sisyrinchium chilense, yellow maiden*

Orchidaceae

- Chloraea fonkii, Gaudichaud's orchid*
- Codonorchis lessonii, dog orchid*
- Gavilea australis, pale yellow orchid*
- Gavilea littoralis, yellow orchid*

Xanthorrhoeaceae

- Phormium tenax, New Zealand flax†

=== Poales ===
Centrolepidaceae

- Gaimardia australis, gaimardia*

Cyperaceae

- Carex acaulis, small dusky sedge*
- Carex aematorrhyncha, blood-beak sedge*
- Carex banksii, Banks' sedge*
- Carex caduca, caducous sedge*
- Carex canescens, white sedge*
- Carex decidua, creek sedge*
- Carex flacca, glaucous sedge†
- Carex fuscula, dusky sedge*
- Carex macloviana, Falkland sedge*
- Carex magellanica, fuegian sedge*
- Carex microglochin, bristle sedge*
- Carex sagei, Sage's sedge*
- Carex trifida, sword-grass*
- Carex vallis-pulchrae, marsh sedge*
- Eleocharis melanostachys, spike-rush*
- Isolepis cernua, nodding club-rush*
- Oreobolus obtusangulus, oreob / prickly-bog*
- Schoenoplectus californicus, California club-rush*
- Uncinia kingii, king's hook-sedge*
- Uncinia macloviana, hook-sedge*

Juncaceae

- Juncus articulatus, jointed rush†
- Juncus bufonius, toad rush†
- Juncus effusus, soft rush†
- Juncus scheuchzerioides,* rush*
- Luzula alopecurus,* wood-rush*
- Luzula campestris, field wood-rush†
- Luzula multiflora subsp. congesta, dense-headed heath wood-rush†
- Luzula multiflora subsp. multiflora, heath wood-rush†
- Marsippospermum grandiflorum, tall rush*
- Rostkovia magellanica, short rush / brown rush*

Poaceae

- Agrostis capillaris, common bent†
- Agrostis meyenii, Meyen's bent*
- Agrostis stolonifera, creeping bent†
- Aira caryophyllea, silver hair-grass†
- Aira praecox, early hair-grass†
- Alopecurus geniculatus, marsh foxtail†
- Alopecurus magellanicus, Fuegian foxtail*
- Ammophila arenaria, marram†
- Anthoxanthum odoratum, sweet vernal-grass†
- Arrhenatherum elatius, false oat-grass†
- Avena sativa, oat†
- Bromus catharticus, rescue brome†
- Bromus condensatus, upright brome†
- Bromus hordeaceus, soft brome†
- Bromus sterilis, barren brome†
- Cortaderia pilosa, whitegrass*
- Cynosurus cristatus, crested dog's-tail†
- Dactylis glomerata, cock's-foot†
- Deschampsia antarctica, Antarctic hair-grass*
- Deschampsia flexuosa, wavy hair-grass*
- Deschampsia parvula, dwarf hair-grass*
- Elymus farctus, sand couch†
- Elymus magellanicus, Fuegian couch*
- Elymus repens, common couch†
- Festuca contracta, land-tussac*
- Festuca filiformis, fine-leaved sheep's fescue – Poaceae
- Festuca magellanica, Fuegian fescue*
- Festuca ovina, sheep's fescue – Poaceae
- Festuca pratensis, meadow fescue†
- Festuca rubra, red fescue†
- Hierochloe redolens, cinnamon-grass*
- Holcus lanatus, Yorkshire fog†
- Hordeum comosum, hairy barley†
- Hordeum jubatum, foxtail barley†
- Hordeum murinum, wall barley†
- Koeleria permollis, Berg's hair-grass*
- Leymus arenarius, lyme-grass†
- Lolium multiflorum, Italian rye-grass – Poaceae
- Lolium perenne, perennial rye-grass†
- Phalaris arundinacea var. arundinacea, reed canary-grass†
- Phalaris arundinacea var. picta, gardeners-garters†
- Phleum pratense, timothy†
- Poa alopecurus, bluegrass*
- Poa annua, annual meadow-grass†
- Poa flabellata, tussac / tussac-grass*
- Poa pratensis, smooth-stalked meadow-grass†
- Poa robusta, shore meadow-grass*
- Poa trivialis, rough-stalked meadow-grass†
- Polypogon magellanicus, Fuegian bent*
- Puccinellia pusilla, dwarf saltmarsh-grass*
- Stipa neaei, feathergrass†
- Trisetum phleoides, spiked oat-grass*
- Trisetum spicatum, spike trisetum†
- Triticum aestivum, wheat†
- Vulpia bromoides, squirreltail fescue†
