= Hairy daisy =

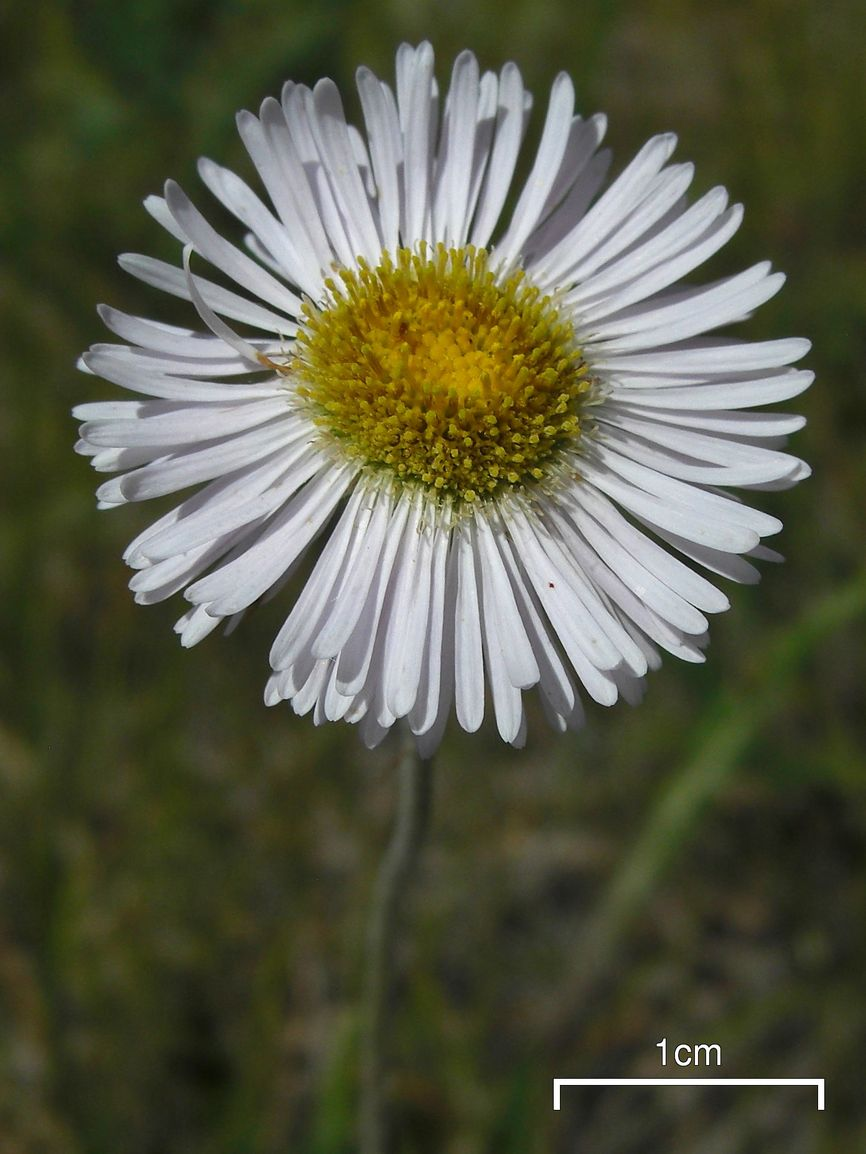
daisy

Hairy daisy is a common name for several plants and may refer to:

- Erigeron concinnus, native to the western United States
- Erigeron incertus, native to the Falkland Islsands
