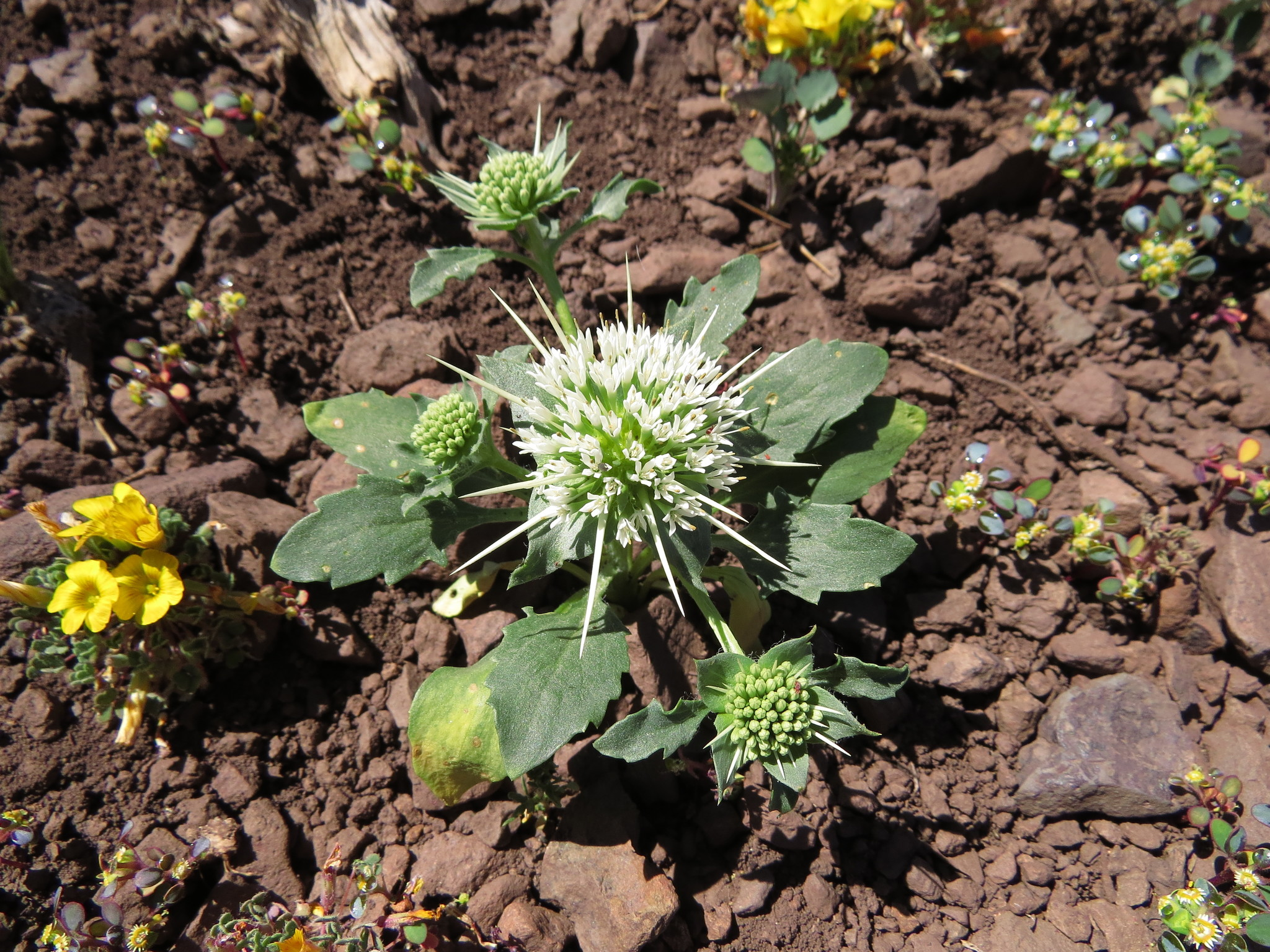
- Boopis eryngioides

Scientific classification
- Kingdom: Plantae
- Clade: Tracheophytes
- Clade: Angiosperms
- Clade: Eudicots
- Clade: Asterids
- Order: Asterales
- Family: Calyceraceae
- Genus: Boopis; Juss.

Species
- See text

Synonyms
- Acarpha Griseb.; Anomocarpus Miers; Chionophila Miers ex Lindl.; Leucocera Turcz.

= Boopis =

Genus of flowering plants

Boopis is a genus of flowering plants in the family Calyceraceae, which includes eight species native to Chile and western Argentina.

The genus has been subject to several major revisions. In 2016 the genus as it was then circumscribed was found to be highly polyphyletic, and several species were moved to other genera. In 2024 Pozner et al. placed Boopis anthemoides in the new monotypic genus Xiphodesma, and determined that Boopis was the correct name for the "pilose group" of Calyceraceae species which Pozner et al. had previously placed in Leucocera.

== Species ==
Eight species are currently accepted:

- Boopis breviscapa Phil.
- Boopis eryngioides (J.Rémy) Pozner & Zijlstra
- Boopis horrida (Hicken) Pozner & Zijlstra
- Boopis leucanthema Poepp. ex Less.
- Boopis pterocalyx Zav.-Gallo, S.Denham & Pozner
- Boopis pusilla Phil.
- Boopis sessiliflora (Phil.) Pozner & Zijlstra
- Boopis sympaganthera (Ruiz & Pav.) Pozner & Zijlstra

=== Formerly placed here ===
- Xiphodesma anthemoides (Juss.) Pozner & Zijlstra (as Boopis anthemoides Juss.)
