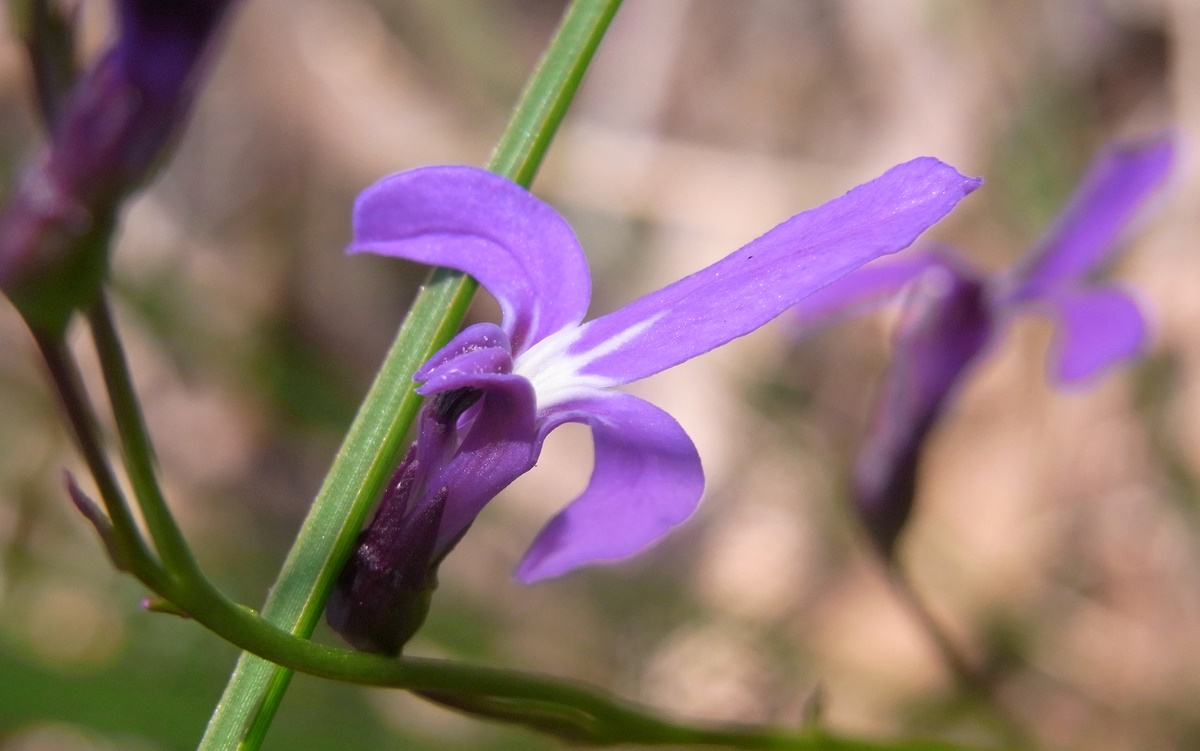
- St Ives North, Australia

Scientific classification
- Kingdom: Plantae
- Clade: Tracheophytes
- Clade: Angiosperms
- Clade: Eudicots
- Clade: Asterids
- Order: Asterales
- Family: Campanulaceae
- Genus: Lobelia
- Species: L. dentata

Binomial name
- Lobelia dentata Cav.

Synonyms
- Rapuntium dentatum (Cav.) C.Presl

= Lobelia dentata =

Species of flowering plant

Lobelia dentata is a herb found in eastern Australia. The habitat is eucalyptus woodland and forest, often on sandy soils. It is an uncommon species, but may be locally abundant after bushfires.

Lobelia dentata grows as a slender, hairless plant, growing to 40 cm (16 in) high. The flowers form on a raceme and appear from March to November. The dark blue or purple flowers are small, but create a spectacular sight with their abundance and beauty. The specific epithet dentata refers to the "toothed leaves". The leaves are 1 to 4 cm long, and 3 to 10 mm wide. The fruiting capsule is 4 to 7 mm long, and 4 mm in diameter.

The original specimen was collected by Joseph Banks and Daniel Solander at Botany Bay in 1770, when part of the first voyage of Captain James Cook.

This plant first appeared in scientific literature in 1800, in the Icones et Descriptiones Plantarum, authored by the Spanish botanist Antonio José Cavanilles.

The species ranges along coastal districts of New South Wales from Murwillumbah to Batemans Bay. It also occurs in Victoria. The habitat is eucalypt forest.
