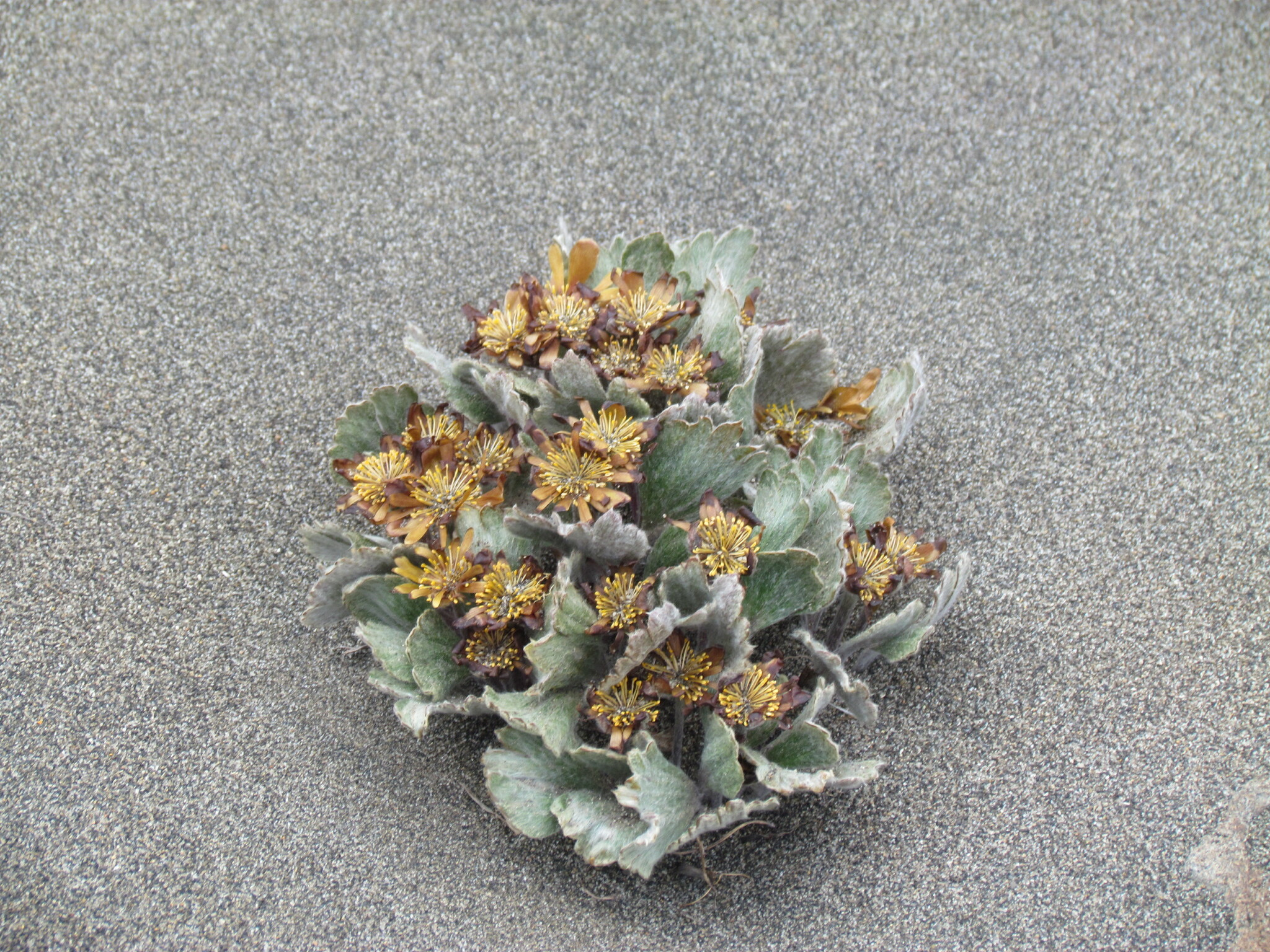
- Hamadryas kingii

Scientific classification
- Kingdom: Plantae
- Clade: Tracheophytes
- Clade: Angiosperms
- Clade: Eudicots
- Order: Ranunculales
- Family: Ranunculaceae
- Subfamily: Ranunculoideae
- Tribe: Ranunculeae
- Genus: Hamadryas; Comm. ex Juss.

= Hamadryas (plant) =

Genus of flowering plants

Hamadryas is a genus of flowering, perennial herbs in the family Ranunculaceae. It is found in the southernmost regions of Chile and Argentina, as well as the Falkland Islands, predominantly in alpine and sub-alpine habitats. The range of one species, Hamadryas delfinii, extends north into San Juan Province, Argentina.

The five identified species are

- Hamadryas argentea
- Hamadryas delfinii
- Hamadryas kingii
- Hamadryas magellanica
- Hamadryas sempervivoides
