= Gamocarpha falklandica =

Conservation status
- Endangered (IUCN 3.1)

Scientific classification
- Kingdom: Plantae
- Clade: Tracheophytes
- Clade: Angiosperms
- Clade: Eudicots
- Clade: Asterids
- Order: Asterales
- Family: Calyceraceae
- Genus: Gamocarpha
- Species: G. falklandica

Binomial name
- Gamocarpha falklandica (D.M.Moore) S.Denham & Pozner (2018)

Synonyms
- Nastanthus falklandicus D.M.Moore (1967)

Species of flowering plant

Gamocarpha falklandica, also called false-plantain, is a species of perennial plant in the Calyceraceae family. It is endemic to Falkland Islands. Its natural habitat is rocky shores.
