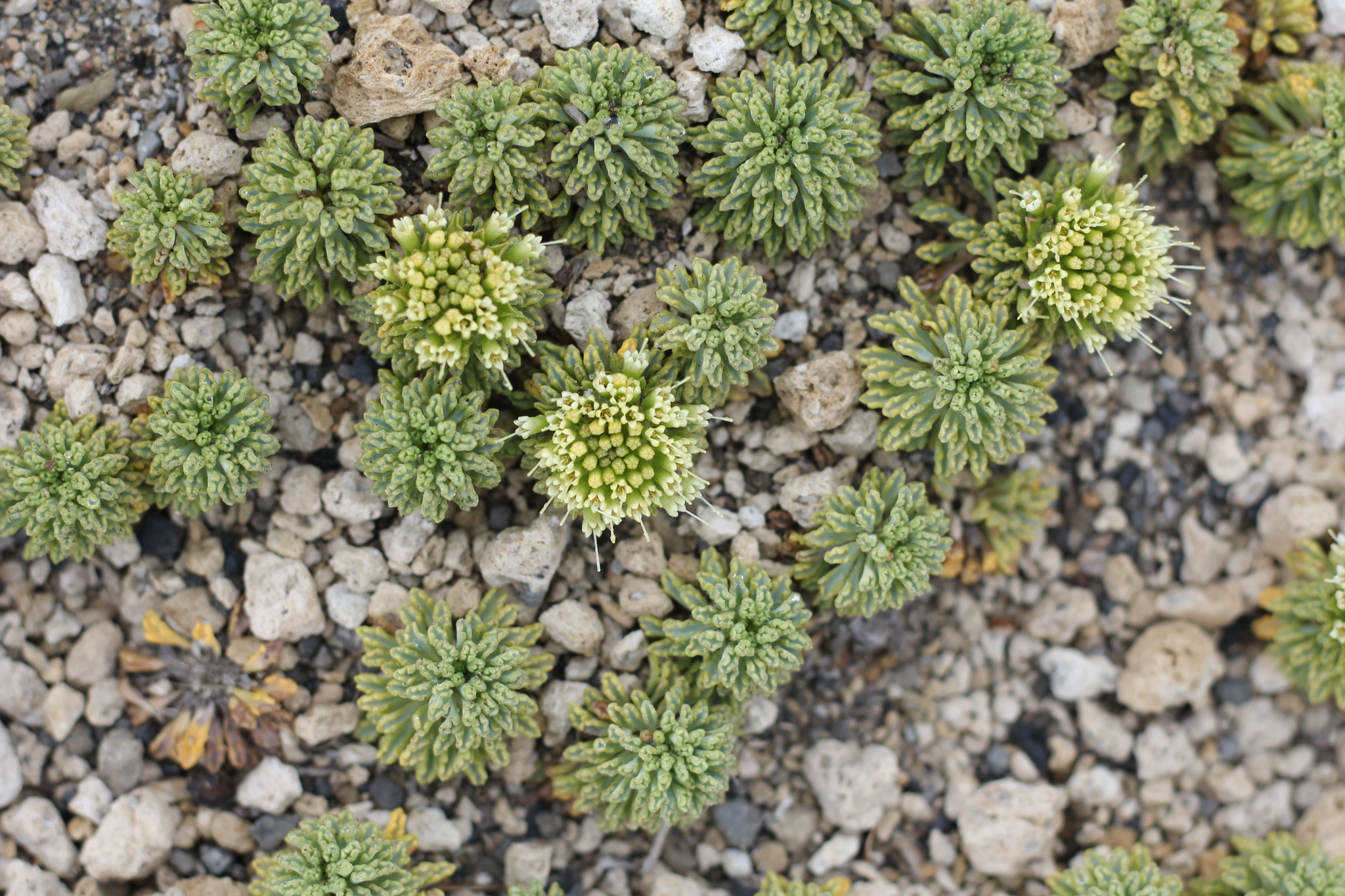
- Gamocarpha dentata

Scientific classification
- Kingdom: Plantae
- Clade: Tracheophytes
- Clade: Angiosperms
- Clade: Eudicots
- Clade: Asterids
- Order: Asterales
- Family: Calyceraceae
- Genus: Gamocarpha; DC.

Species
- See text

Synonyms
- Nastanthus Miers (1860)

= Gamocarpha =

Genus of Calyceraceae plants

Gamocarpha is a genus of flowering plants in the family Calyceraceae, native to the Andes of Chile and Argentina. It includes the former genus Nastanthus.

== Species ==
Currently accepted species include:

- Gamocarpha alpina (Poepp. ex Less.) H.V.Hansen
- Gamocarpha australis (Decne.) S.Denham & Pozner
- Gamocarpha caespitosa (Phil.) S.Denham & Pozner
- Gamocarpha chubutensis (Speg.) S.Denham & Pozner
- Gamocarpha compacta (Phil.) S.Denham & Pozner
- Gamocarpha falklandica (D.M.Moore) S.Denham & Pozner
- Gamocarpha graminea (Phil.) S.Denham & Pozner
- Gamocarpha macrocephala S.Denham & Pozner
- Gamocarpha multicaulis (Phil.) S.Denham & Pozner
- Gamocarpha raffaellii (Speg.) S.Denham & Pozner
- Gamocarpha scapigera (J.Rémy) S.Denham & Pozner
- Gamocarpha selliana Reiche
- Gamocarpha ventosa (Meyen) S.Denham & Pozner
