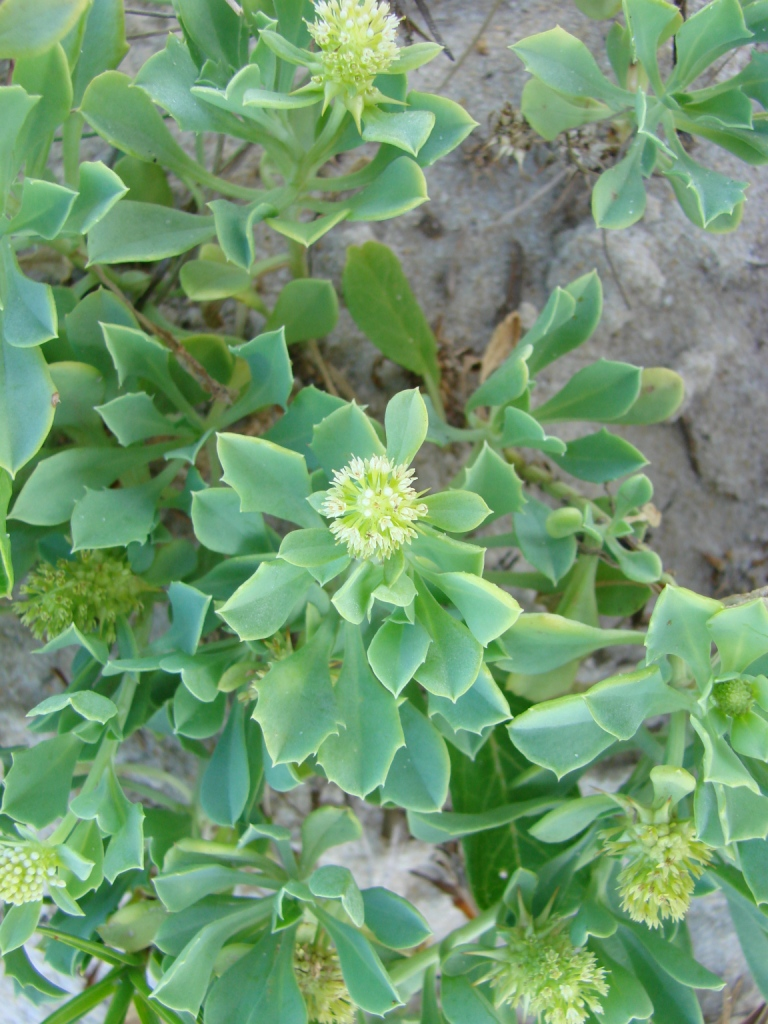
- Acicarpha bonariensis here given as Acicarpha spathulata

Scientific classification
- Kingdom: Plantae
- Clade: Embryophytes
- Clade: Tracheophytes
- Clade: Spermatophytes
- Clade: Angiosperms
- Clade: Eudicots
- Clade: Asterids
- Order: Asterales
- Family: Calyceraceae
- Genus: Acicarpha; Juss.

Species
- See text

Synonyms
- Acanthosperma Vell.; Cryptocarpha Cass.; Echinolema J.Jacq. ex DC.; Sommea Bory

= Acicarpha =

Genus of Calyceraceae plants

Acicarpha is a genus of flowering plants in the family Calyceraceae, native to drier areas of southern South America. They prefer to grow alongside rivers or the shores of the Atlantic Ocean.

== Species ==
Currently accepted species include:

- Acicarpha bupleuroides Less.
- Acicarpha itatiaiae (Dusén) S.Denham & Pozner
- Acicarpha juergensii (Pilg.) S.Denham & Pozner
- Acicarpha obtusisepala Marchesi
- Acicarpha procumbens Less.
- Acicarpha spathulata R.Br.
- Acicarpha tribuloides Juss.
