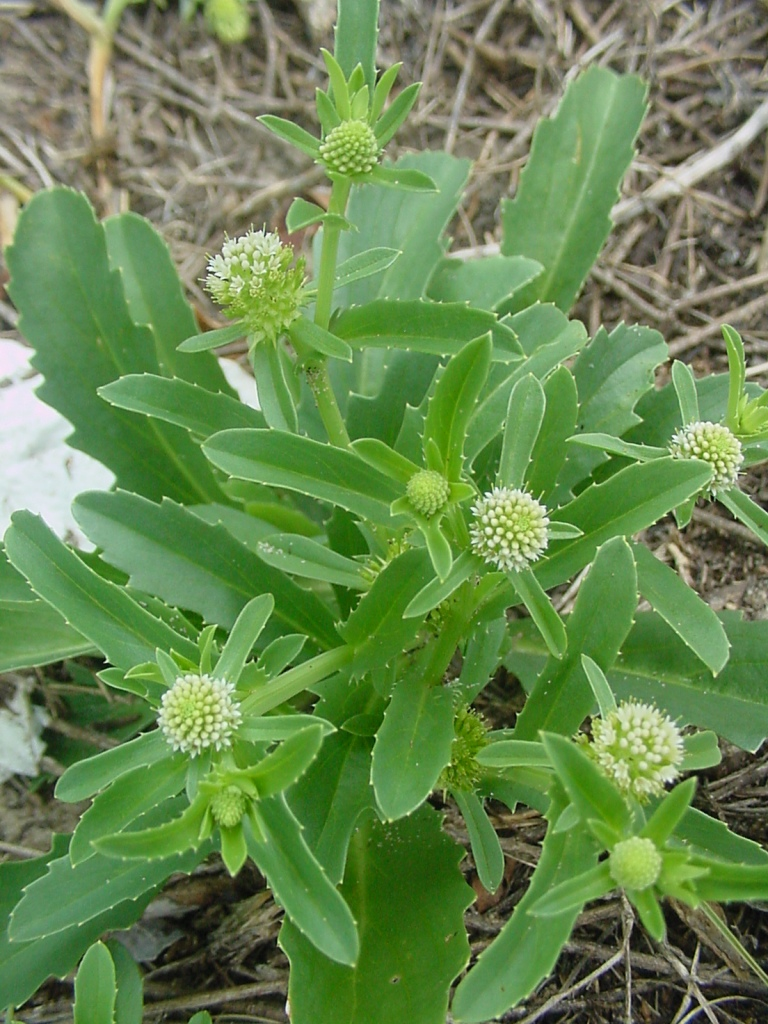
- Calycera crassifolia

Scientific classification
- Kingdom: Plantae
- Clade: Embryophytes
- Clade: Tracheophytes
- Clade: Spermatophytes
- Clade: Angiosperms
- Clade: Eudicots
- Clade: Asterids
- Order: Asterales
- Family: Calyceraceae
- Genus: Calycera; Cav. (1797)

Type species
- Calycera herbacea Cav.

Synonyms
- Discophytum Miers (1847); Gymnocaulus Phil. (1856)

= Calycera =

Genus of flowering plants

Calycera is a genus of flowering plants in family Calyceraceae native to South America. It formerly contained up to 14 species. Six are currently accepted.

== Species ==
Species include:

- Calycera calcitrapa Griseb.
- Calycera crassifolia (Miers) Hicken
- Calycera herbacea Cav.
- Calycera monocephala (Phil.) S.Denham & Pozner
- Calycera necronensis (Zav.-Gallo, S.Denham & Pozner) S.Denham & Pozner
- Calycera pulvinata J.Rémy
