= Asynthema =

Scientific classification
- Kingdom: Plantae
- Clade: Tracheophytes
- Clade: Angiosperms
- Clade: Eudicots
- Clade: Asterids
- Order: Asterales
- Family: Calyceraceae
- Genus: Asynthema; S.Denham & Pozner (2021)
- Species: A. gracile

Binomial name
- Asynthema gracile (Phil.) S.Denham & Pozner (2021)

Synonyms
- Boopis bicolor Phil. (1894); Boopis gracilis Phil. (1856); Boopis pozoiformis Phil. (1872); Calycera boopidea Hicken (1919)

Genus of plants

Asynthema gracile is a species of flowering plant in family Calyceraceae. It is a perennial native to western and southern Argentina and central Chile. It is the sole species in genus Asynthema.
