= Anachoretes =

Scientific classification
- Kingdom: Plantae
- Clade: Tracheophytes
- Clade: Angiosperms
- Clade: Eudicots
- Clade: Asterids
- Order: Asterales
- Family: Calyceraceae
- Genus: Anachoretes; S.Denham & Pozner (2021)
- Species: A. castillonii

Binomial name
- Anachoretes castillonii (Hicken) S.Denham & Pozner (2021)

Synonyms
- Boopis castillonii (Hicken) Pontiroli (1963); Calycera castillonii Hicken (1914)

Genus of flowering plants

Anachoretes castillonii is a species of flowering plant in family Calyceraceae. It is a perennial endemic to the Sierra de Ambato in Catamarca Province of northwestern Argentina. It is the sole species in genus Anachoretes.
