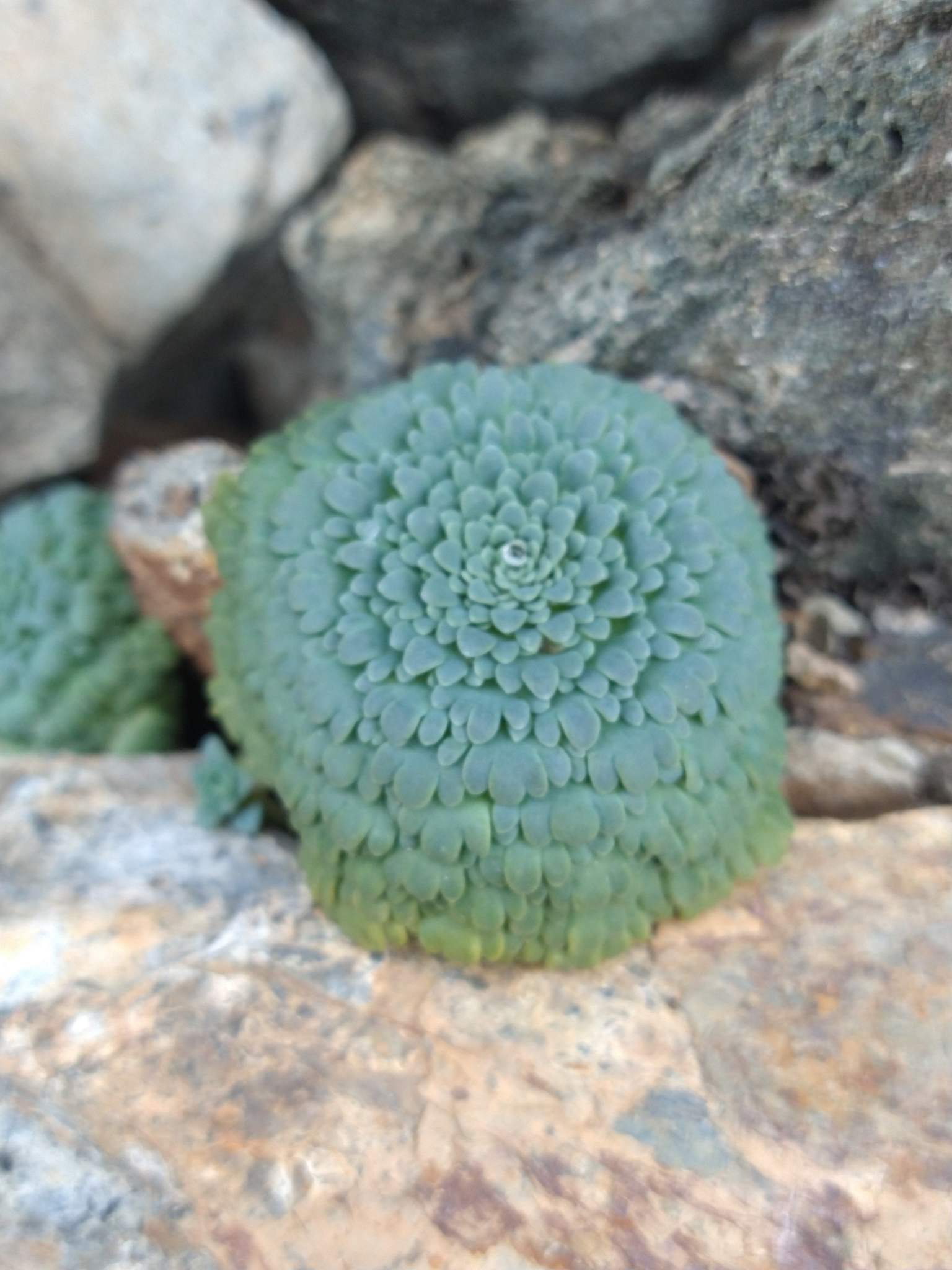
- Moschopsis rosulata in Tierra del Fuego, Argentina

Scientific classification
- Kingdom: Plantae
- Clade: Tracheophytes
- Clade: Angiosperms
- Clade: Eudicots
- Clade: Asterids
- Order: Asterales
- Family: Calyceraceae
- Genus: Moschopsis; Phil.

Species
- See text

= Moschopsis =

Genus of Calyceraceae plants

Moschopsis is a genus of flowering plants in the family Calyceraceae, native to the Andes of Chile and Argentina in southern South America. They are compact perennial succulents appearing somewhat like small heads of broccoli or artichokes.

== Species ==
10 species are currently accepted:

- Moschopsis ameghinoi (Speg.) Dusén
- Moschopsis angustifolia (Phil.) Pozner & S.Denham
- Moschopsis caleofuensis (Speg.) Dusén
- Moschopsis dentata (Phil.) Pozner & S.Denham
- Moschopsis filifolia (Speg.) Pozner & S.Denham
- Moschopsis leyboldii Phil.
- Moschopsis patagonica (Speg.) Pozner & S.Denham
- Moschopsis rosulata (N.E.Br.) Dusén ex Hicken
- Moschopsis subandina (Speg.) Dusén
- Moschopsis trilobata Dusén
