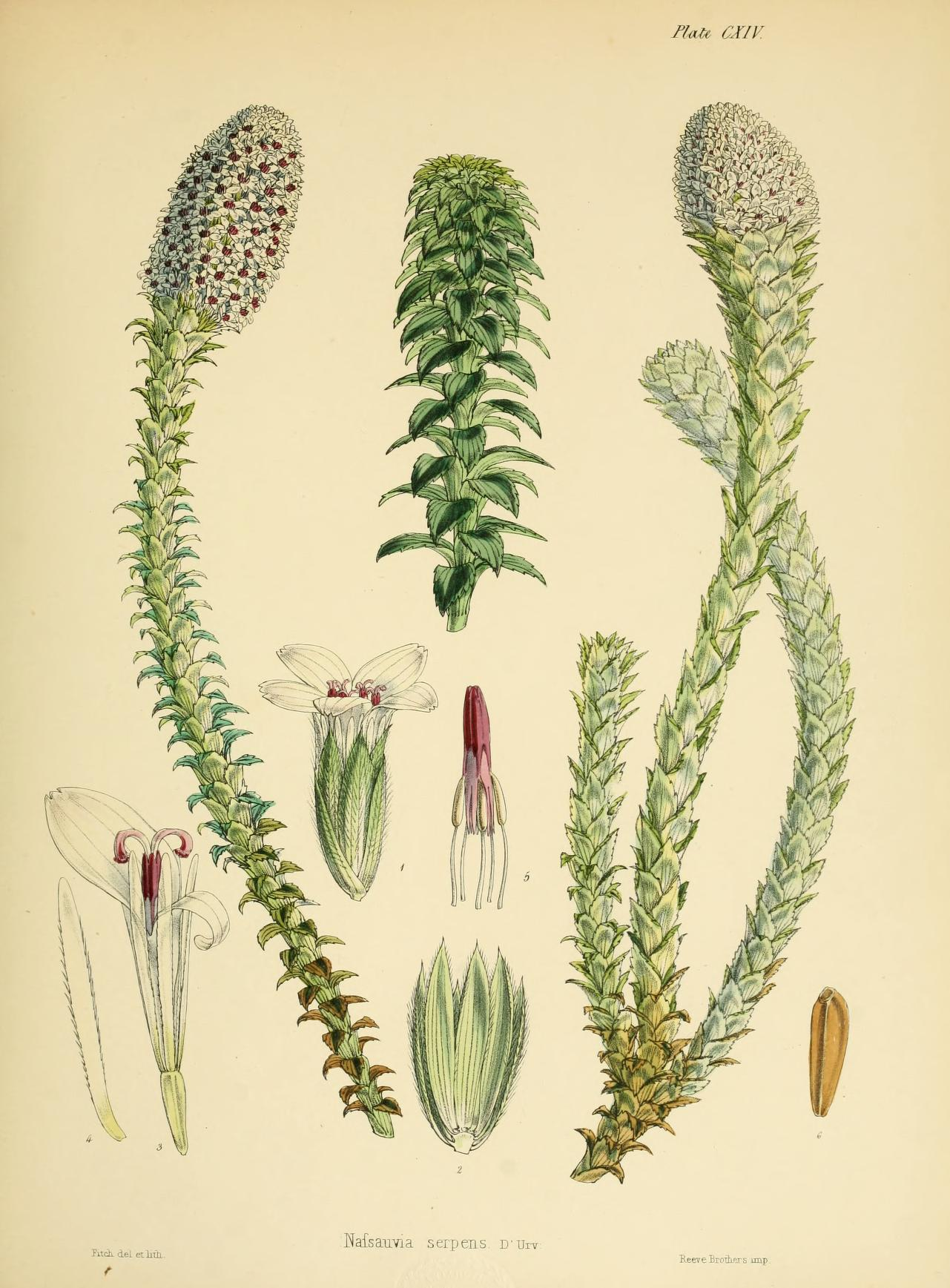

Conservation status
- Least Concern (IUCN 3.1)

Scientific classification
- Kingdom: Plantae
- Clade: Tracheophytes
- Clade: Angiosperms
- Clade: Eudicots
- Clade: Asterids
- Order: Asterales
- Family: Asteraceae
- Genus: Nassauvia
- Species: N. serpens

Binomial name
- Nassauvia serpens d'Urv.

Synonyms
- Nassauvia durvillei Cass.

= Nassauvia serpens =

Species of plant

Nassauvia serpens, the snakeplant, is a species of plant in the family Asteraceae. It is endemic to the Falkland Islands. Its natural habitats are temperate shrublands, and rocky areas. Although assessed as Least Concern, it is experiencing continued habitat loss.
