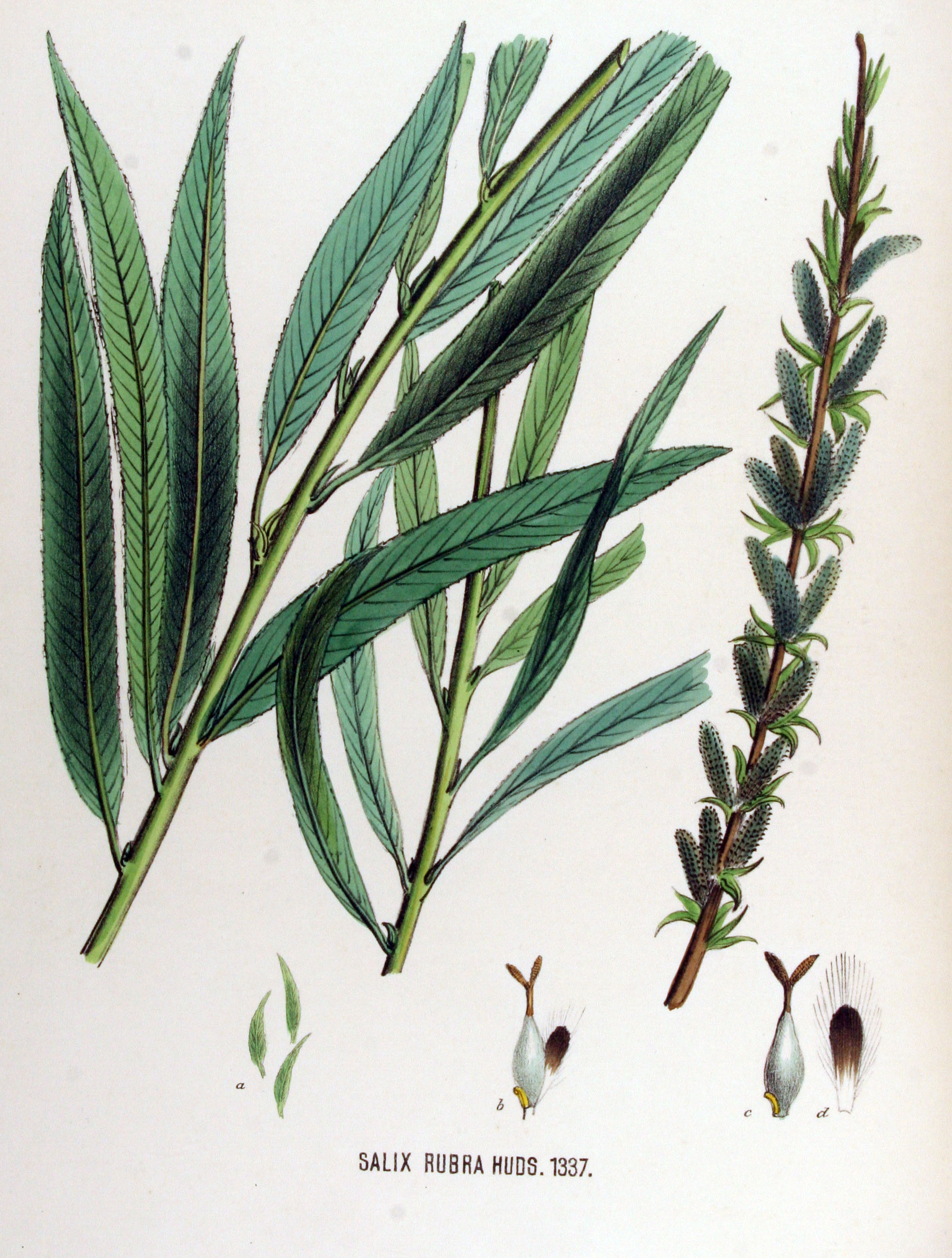
- Botanical illustration

Scientific classification
- Kingdom: Plantae
- Clade: Tracheophytes
- Clade: Angiosperms
- Clade: Eudicots
- Clade: Rosids
- Order: Malpighiales
- Family: Salicaceae
- Genus: Salix
- Species: S. × rubra

Binomial name
- Salix × rubra Huds.

Synonyms
- List: Diamarips × rubra Raf.; Nectolis × membranacea (Thuill.) Raf.; Salix × concolor Host; Salix × fissa Hoffm.; Salix × furcata Tausch ex Wimm.; Salix × membranacea Thuill.; Salix × mirabilis Host; Salix × monandra Hoffm.; Salix × monandra var. monadelpha Gaudin; Salix × polyphylla R.I.Schröd.

= Salix × rubra =

Hybrid species of flowering plant

Salix × rubra, the green-leaved willow or red osier, is a naturally occurring hybrid species of flowering plant in the family Salicaceae. It is the result of crosses between Salix purpurea (purple willow) and Salix viminalis (common osier). It is native to a large part of Europe, found where the parent species' ranges overlap. The straight, flexible stems are prized by basketmakers. There are a number of cultivars, with the fastigiate 'Eugenei' being the best known.
