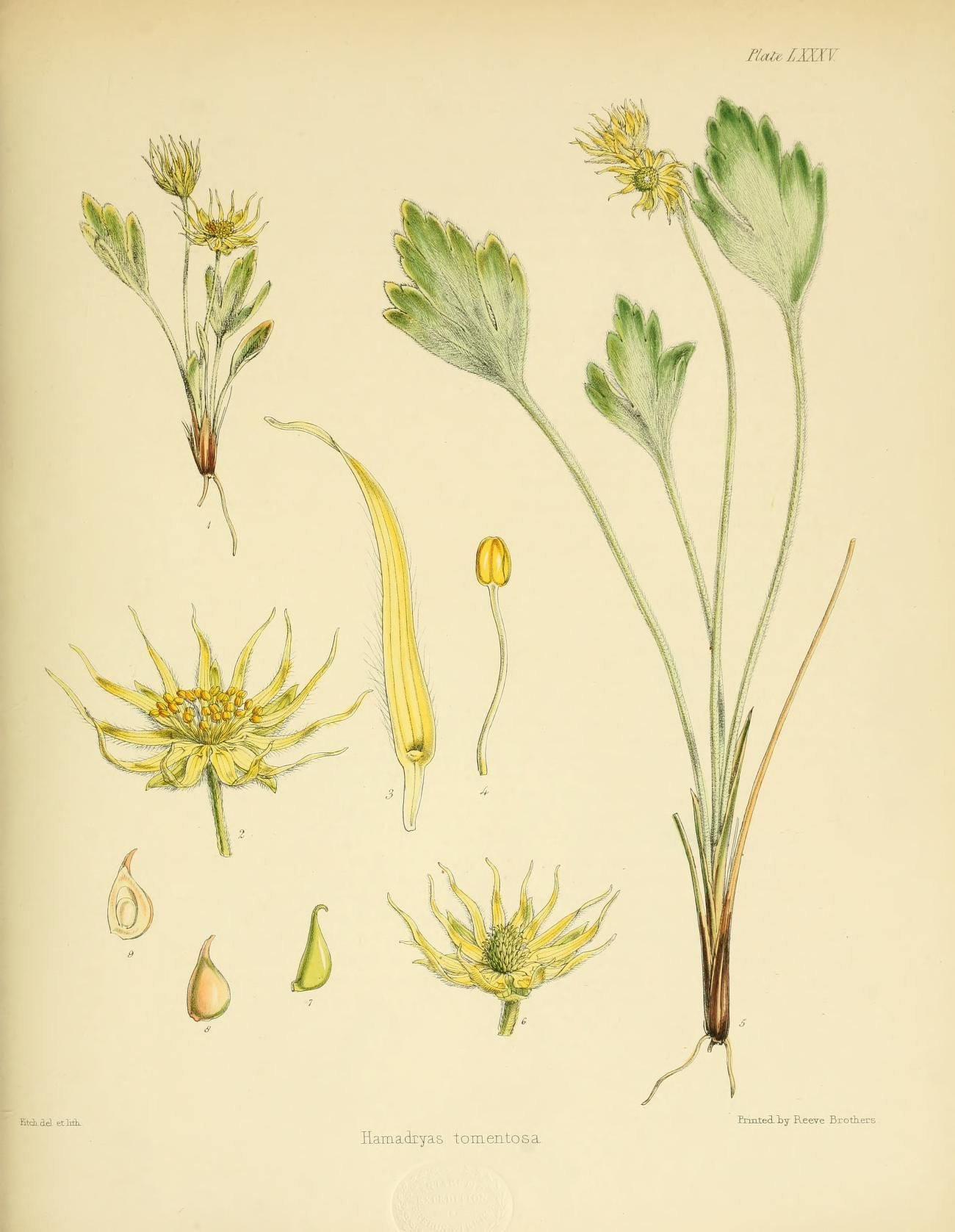
- Etching from the Flora Antarctica

Conservation status
- Near Threatened (IUCN 3.1)

Scientific classification
- Kingdom: Plantae
- Clade: Tracheophytes
- Clade: Angiosperms
- Clade: Eudicots
- Order: Ranunculales
- Family: Ranunculaceae
- Genus: Hamadryas
- Species: H. argentea

Binomial name
- Hamadryas argentea Hook.f.

= Hamadryas argentea =

Species of flowering plant

Hamadryas argentea, the silvery buttercup, is a species of plant in the family Ranunculaceae. It is endemic to Falkland Islands. Its natural habitats are temperate dwarf shrub heath and temperate grassland.
