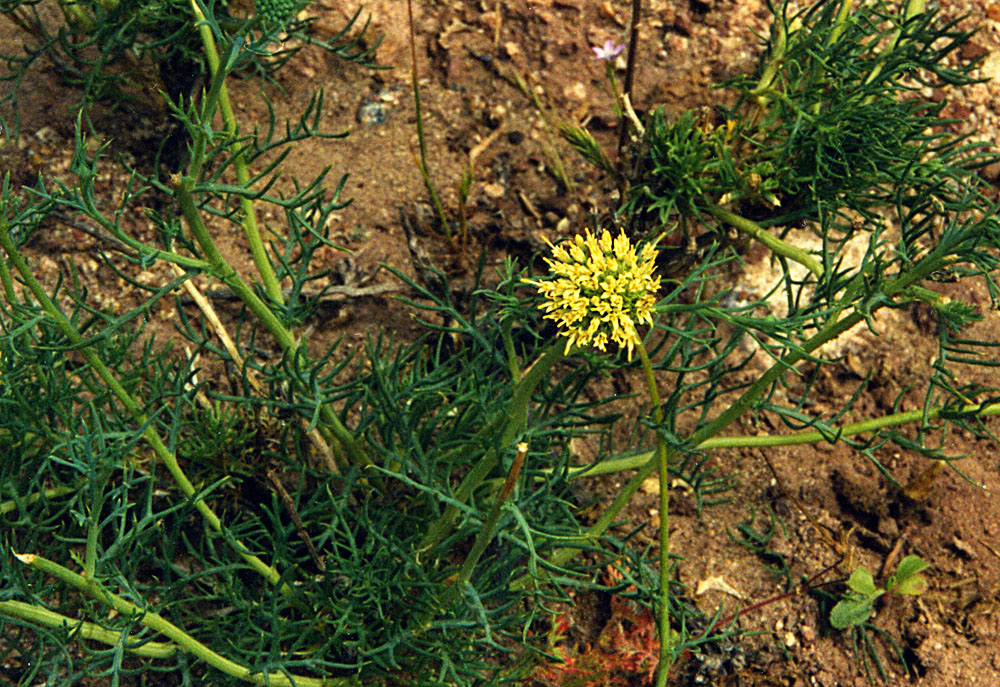

Scientific classification
- Kingdom: Plantae
- Clade: Tracheophytes
- Clade: Angiosperms
- Clade: Eudicots
- Clade: Asterids
- Order: Asterales
- Family: Calyceraceae
- Genus: Xiphodesma; Pozner & Zijlstra (2024)
- Species: X. anthemoides

Binomial name
- Xiphodesma anthemoides (Juss.) Pozner & Zijlstra

Synonyms
- Boopis anthemoides Juss. (1803) (species basionym); Boopis anthemoides var. andina Hieron.; Boopis anthemoides f. patagonica (Hieron.) Hicken; Boopis anthemoides var. rigidula (Miers) Griseb.; Boopis anthemoides var. subintegrifolia Hicken; Boopis anthemoides var. subscandens Speg.; Boopis rigidula Miers; Boopis rigidula var. patagonica Hieron.

= Xiphodesma =

Genus of flowering plants

Xiphodesma is a genus of flowering plants in the family Calyceraceae. It includes a single species, Xiphodesma anthemoides, a perennial native to Argentina and Uruguay.

The species was first described as Boopis anthemoides by Antoine Laurent de Jussieu in 1803. In 2024 Pozner and Zijlstra placed it in the new monotypic genus Xiphodesma as Xiphodesma anthemoides.
