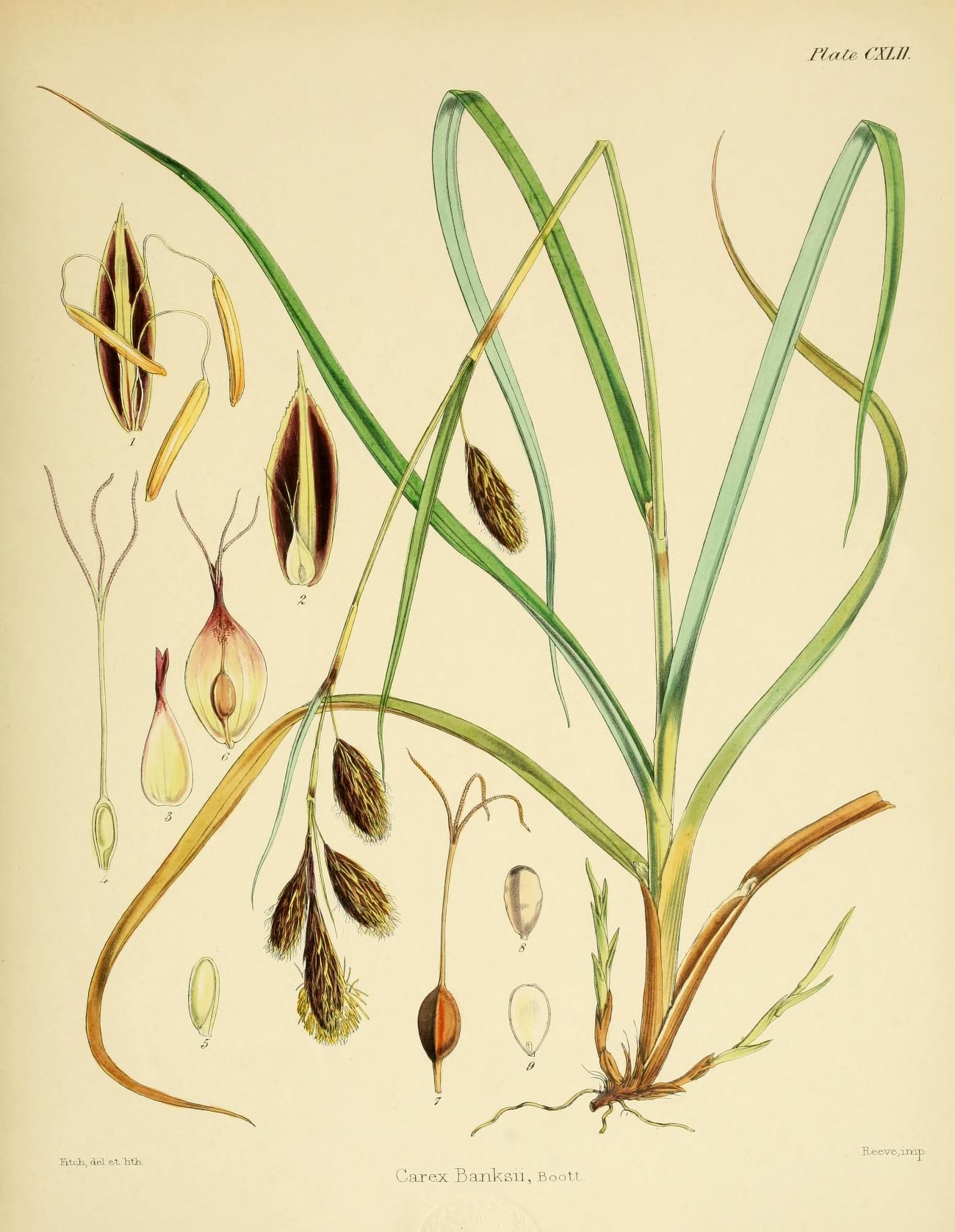

Scientific classification
- Kingdom: Plantae
- Clade: Tracheophytes
- Clade: Angiosperms
- Clade: Monocots
- Clade: Commelinids
- Order: Poales
- Family: Cyperaceae
- Genus: Carex
- Species: C. banksii

Binomial name
- Carex banksii Boott

= Carex banksii =

Species of grass-like plant

Carex banksii is a species of flowering plant in the sedge family, Cyperaceae. Carex banksii is native to South America and was first formally named by Francis Boott in 1839.

Four varieties are accepted:

- Carex banksii var. abbreviata Kük.
- Carex banksii var. banksii
- Carex banksii var. fonkii (Phil.) Kük.
- Carex banksii var. odontolepis (Phil.) Kük.
