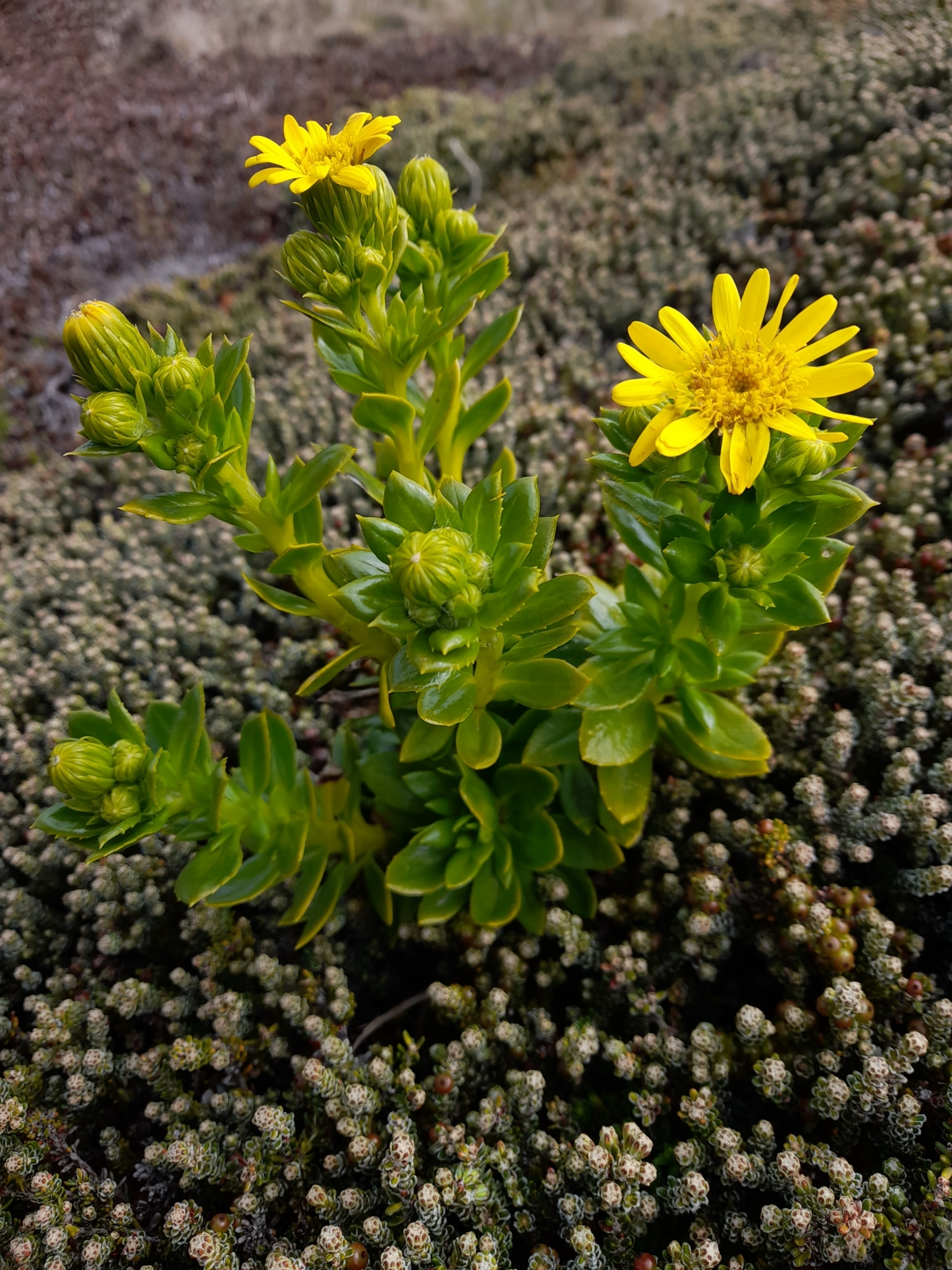

Conservation status
- Least Concern (IUCN 3.1)

Scientific classification
- Kingdom: Plantae
- Clade: Tracheophytes
- Clade: Angiosperms
- Clade: Eudicots
- Clade: Asterids
- Order: Asterales
- Family: Asteraceae
- Genus: Senecio
- Species: S. vaginatus

Binomial name
- Senecio vaginatus Hook & Arn.

= Senecio vaginatus =

Species of flowering plant

Senecio vaginatus, the smooth ragwort, is a species of flowering plant in the aster family. It is endemic to the Falkland Islands. Its natural habitats are temperate shrubland, rocky shores and other rocky areas. It is threatened by habitat loss.
