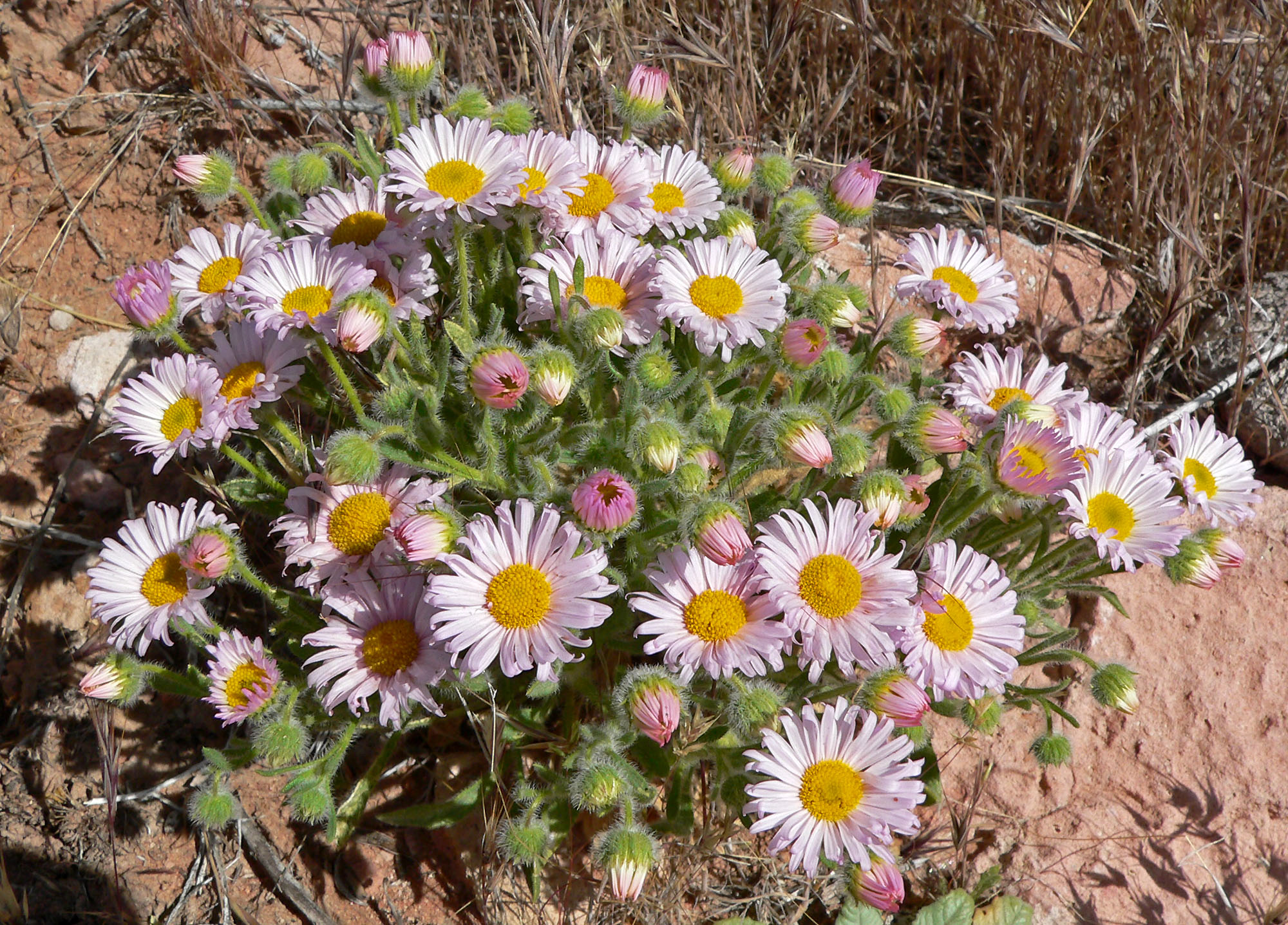

Conservation status
- Apparently Secure (NatureServe)

Scientific classification
- Kingdom: Plantae
- Clade: Tracheophytes
- Clade: Angiosperms
- Clade: Eudicots
- Clade: Asterids
- Order: Asterales
- Family: Asteraceae
- Genus: Erigeron
- Species: E. concinnus

Binomial name
- Erigeron concinnus (Hook. & Arn.) Torr. & A.Gray

Synonyms
- Synonymy: Distasis concinna Hook. & Arn.; Erigeron brandegeei A.Gray; Erigeron concinnus var. eremicus Jeps.; Erigeron pumilus subsp. concinnoides Cronquist; Erigeron pumilus var. concinnoides Cronquist; Erigeron pumilus var. concinnus (Hook. & Arn.) Dorn; Erigeron setulosus Greene; Erigeron simulans Greene; Erigeron condensatus (D.C.Eaton) Greene, syn of var. condensatus; Erigeron pumilus var. condensatus (D.C.Eaton) Cronquist, syn of var. condensatus; Erigeron wyomingensis A.Nelson, syn of var. condensatus; Erigeron perglaber S.F.Blake, syn of var. subglaber; Erigeron pumilus var. subglaber Cronquist, syn of var. subglaber; Erigeron zothecinus S.L.Welsh, syn of var. subglaber

= Erigeron concinnus =

Species of flowering plant

Erigeron concinnus, the Navajo fleabane, tidy fleabane or hairy daisy, is a perennial flowering plant in the family Asteraceae.

Erigeron concinnus is native to the dry mountains of the Mojave Desert around Death Valley in southeast California, north and east to Nevada, Idaho, Utah, Wyoming, Montana, Colorado, Arizona, and New Mexico; in the California portion of its range, it grows at elevations of 1200–1800 m. Some of the known populations lie inside Mojave National Preserve.

Erigeron concinnus grows in sandy to rocky soils, and can reach a height of 6–16 cm (2.5–6.5 in). The leaves are 2–6 cm (1–2.5 in) long, lanceolate to linear, broadest near the rounded apex. The flower heads are sometimes produced one per branch, sometimes in groups of up to 6, each head 7–11 mm (0.28–0.43 in) in diameter, with 50-125 white, pink, or blue ray florets and yellow disk florets.

Varieties

- Erigeron concinnus var. concinnus - Arizona, California, Colorado, Idaho, Nevada, New Mexico, Utah, Wyoming
- Erigeron concinnus var. condensatus D.C.Eaton - New Mexico, Utah, Wyoming
- Erigeron concinnus var. subglaber (Cronquist) G.L.Nesom - Arizona, Colorado, Utah
