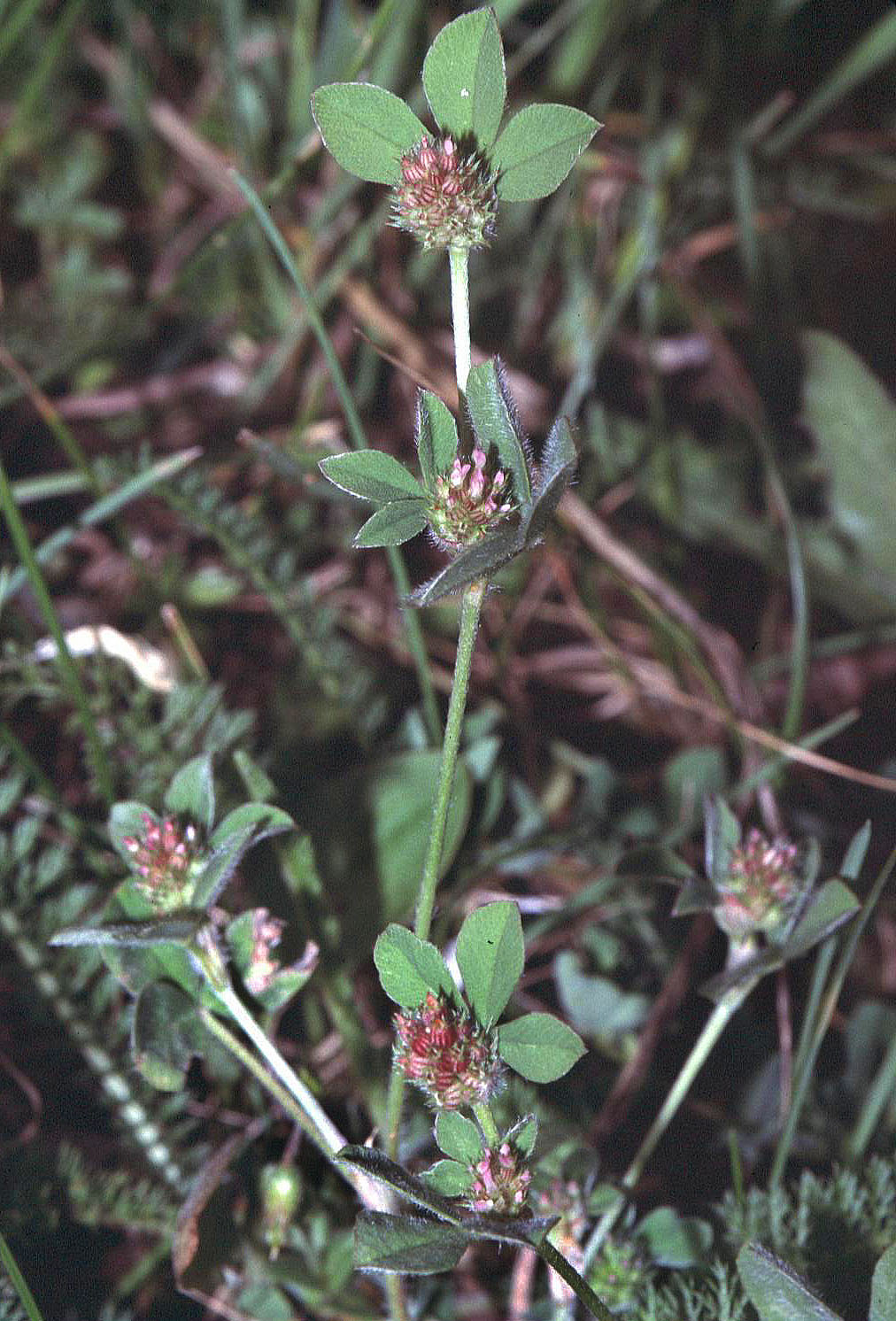

Scientific classification
- Kingdom: Plantae
- Clade: Tracheophytes
- Clade: Angiosperms
- Clade: Eudicots
- Clade: Rosids
- Order: Fabales
- Family: Fabaceae
- Subfamily: Faboideae
- Genus: Trifolium
- Species: T. striatum

Binomial name
- Trifolium striatum L.

= Trifolium striatum =

Species of legume

Trifolium striatum, the knotted clover, soft trefoil, is a flowering plant species in the pea and bean family, Fabaceae.
