= Carex aematorhyncha =

Scientific classification
- Kingdom: Plantae
- Clade: Tracheophytes
- Clade: Angiosperms
- Clade: Monocots
- Clade: Commelinids
- Order: Poales
- Family: Cyperaceae
- Genus: Carex
- Species: C. aematorhyncha

Binomial name
- Carex aematorhyncha Desv.

Synonyms
- List: Carex filiformis subsp. aematorhyncha (Desv.) Kük.'; Carex filiformis var. aematorhyncha(Desv.) W.Boott; Carex aematorhyncha var. corralensis (Phil.) Kük.; Carex campyloxys Steud.; Carex corralensis Phil.; Carex filiformis var. gracilis Kurtz ex Kük.; Carex potamostauros Steud.

Species of grass-like plant

Carex aematorhyncha (common name: blood beak sedge) is a species of flowering plant in the sedge family, Cyperaceae, native to South America. It was first formally named in 1854 in the sixth volume of Flora Chilena.

Two varieties are accepted:

- Carex aematorhyncha var. aematorhyncha Desv.
- Carex aematorhyncha var. corralensis (Phil.) Kük.

== Distribution and habitat ==
The species is endemic to Central and southern Chile to the Falkland Islands.
