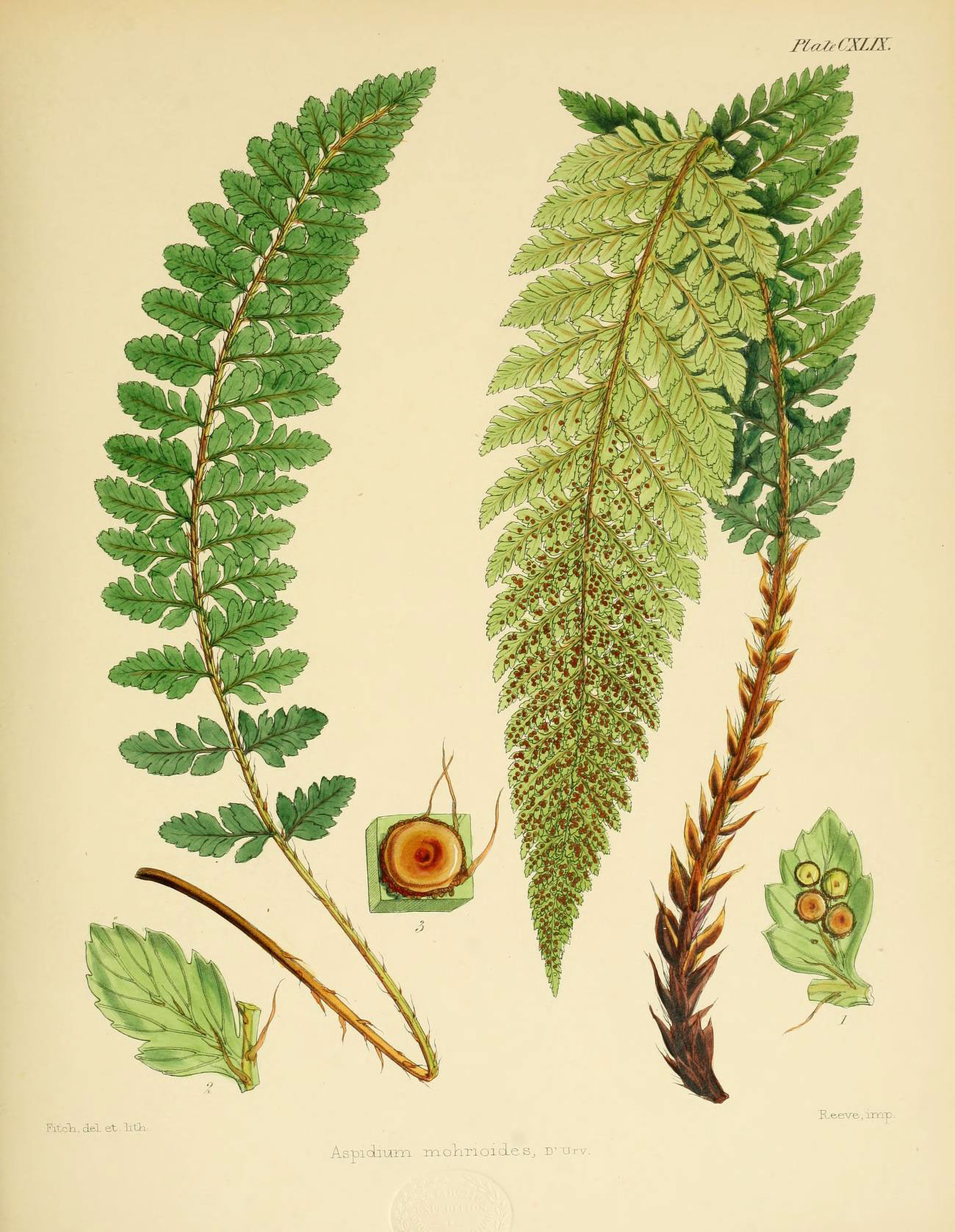

Scientific classification
- Kingdom: Plantae
- Clade: Tracheophytes
- Division: Polypodiophyta
- Class: Polypodiopsida
- Order: Polypodiales
- Suborder: Polypodiineae
- Family: Dryopteridaceae
- Genus: Polystichum
- Species: P. mohrioides

Binomial name
- Polystichum mohrioides (Bory ex Willd.) C.Presl

Synonyms
- Aspidium mohrioides Bory ex Willd.; Nephrodium mohrioides (Bory ex Willd.) Desv.; Polystichum mohrioides var. elegans C. Chr.; Polystichum mohrioides var. scopulinum (D.C. Eaton) Fernald

= Polystichum mohrioides =

Species of fern

Polystichum mohrioides is a fern in the family Dryopteridaceae. It is found only in the Falkland and South Georgia Islands in the South Atlantic Ocean.
