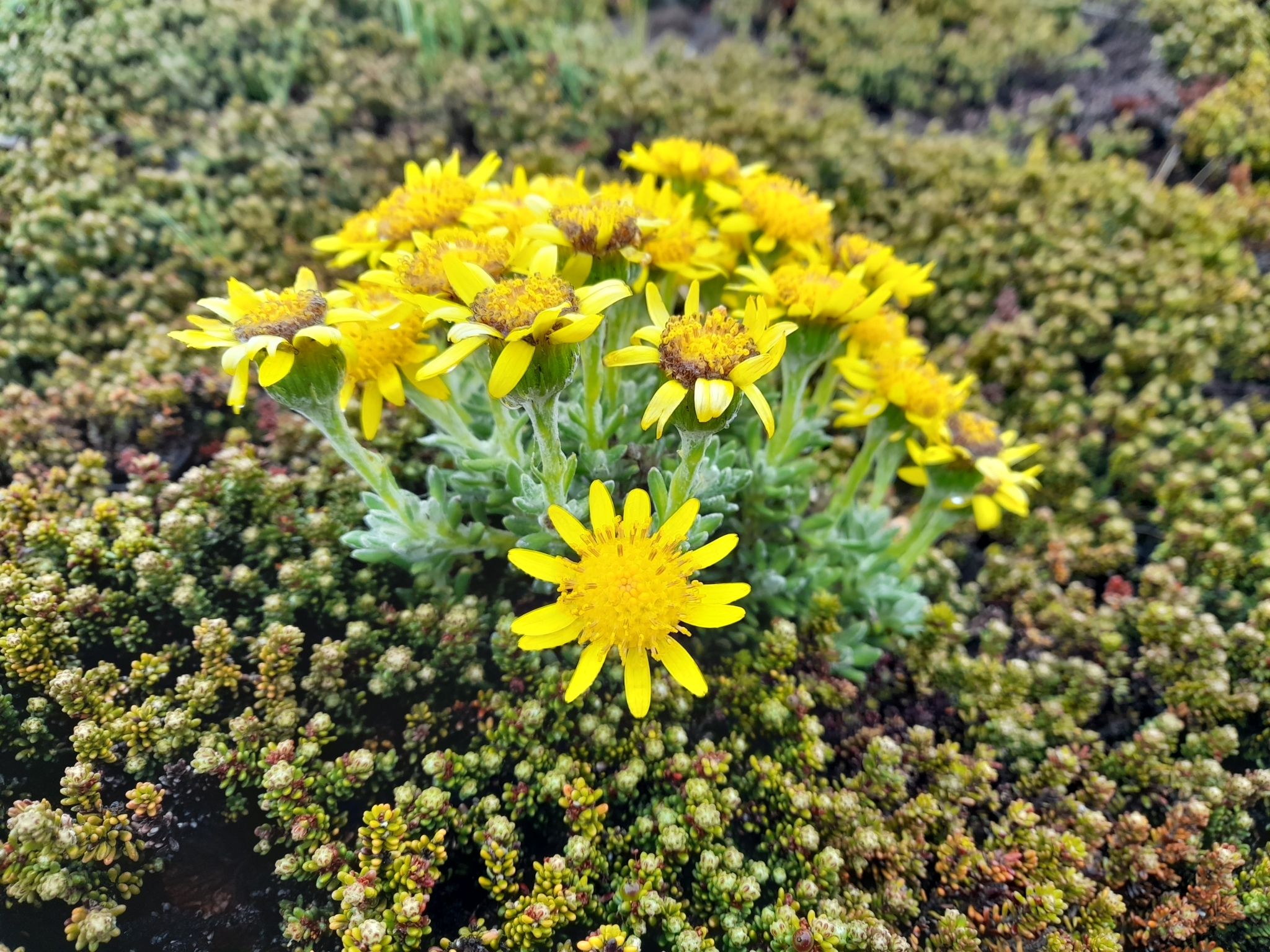

Conservation status
- Least Concern (IUCN 3.1)

Scientific classification
- Kingdom: Plantae
- Clade: Tracheophytes
- Clade: Angiosperms
- Clade: Eudicots
- Clade: Asterids
- Order: Asterales
- Family: Asteraceae
- Genus: Senecio
- Species: S. falklandicus

Binomial name
- Senecio falklandicus Hook.f.

Synonyms
- Senecio littoralis Gaudich., nom. illeg.

= Senecio falklandicus =

Species of flowering plant

Senecio falklandicus, synonym Senecio littoralis Gaudich., is a species of flowering plant in the family Asteraceae endemic to the Falkland Islands. It is known as the woolly ragwort. Its natural habitats are temperate shrubland, rocky areas, and rocky shores. This species is threatened by habitat loss.
