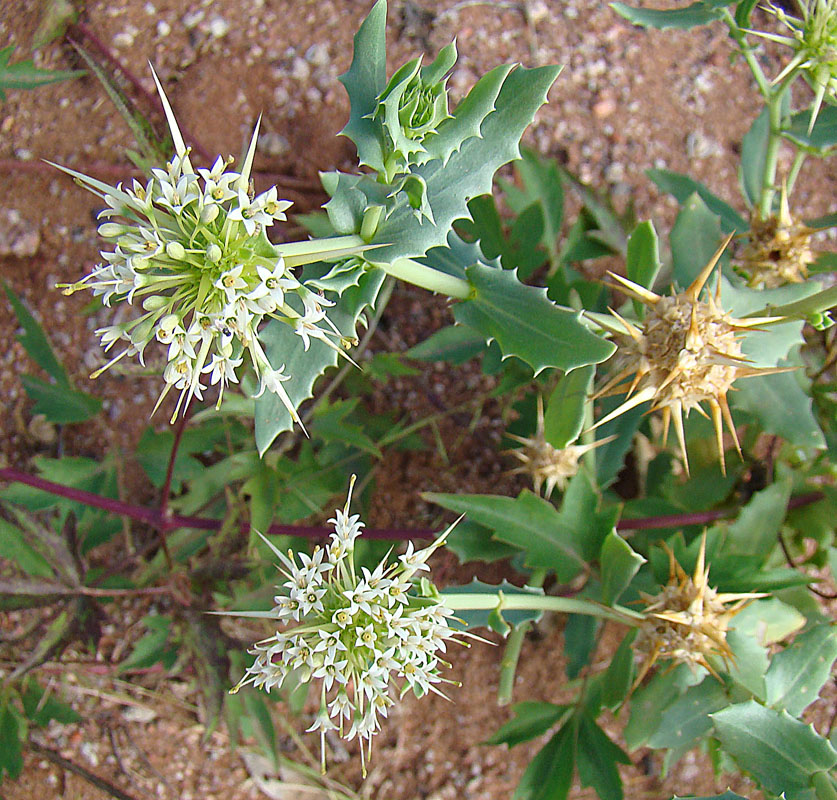
- Calycera calcitrapa

Scientific classification
- Kingdom: Plantae
- Clade: Embryophytes
- Clade: Tracheophytes
- Clade: Spermatophytes
- Clade: Angiosperms
- Clade: Eudicots
- Clade: Asterids
- Order: Asterales
- Family: Calyceraceae; R.Br. ex Rich.

Genera
- Acicarpha Juss.; Anachoretes S.Denham & Pozner; Asynthema S.Denham & Pozner; Boopis Juss.; Calycera Cav.; Gamocarpha DC.; Moschopsis Phil.; Xiphodesma Pozner & Zijlstra

= Calyceraceae =

Family of flowering plants

Calyceraceae is a plant family in the order Asterales. The natural distribution of the about sixty species belonging to this family is restricted to the southern half of South America. The species of the family resemble both the family Asteraceae and the Dipsacaceae.

== Description ==
Calyceraceae are perennial or annual herbs. There may be a few or many branched stems that may be without hair or with soft silky hairs. The leaves may be in a rosette at the base of the stems or set alternately along the stems. Stipules are lacking. The blade of the leaf is simple, but may be lobed to pinnatisect. The margin of the leaves may be entire or toothed. The inflorescences are flowerheads comparable to those in the sunflower family. They are at the top of the stems or opposite leaves, and may have a flower stem or be seated, while each flowerhead may be on its own or in a cyme. Each individual flowerhead is surrounded by an involucre, consisting of one or two rows of bracts that are often leaf-like and usually not merged. The base of the flowerhead may be conical, convex or sometimes almost spheroidal. On the base of the flowerhead, at the base of each individual flower, are linear to narrowly lanceolate, green, chaffy scales (or paleae) that become woody when seeds are ripening. Each flowerhead may contain a few or up to over one hundred hermaphrodite or unisexual, star-symmetric or mirror-symmetric flowers. The petals are fused to form a funnel-shaped or sometimes cylinder-shaped corolla that is split into four to six lobes at the top. The corolla's remains stay on the top of the one-seeded dry fruit at maturity. Four or five stamens alternate with the corolla lobes. The lower third of these filaments are fused with the corolla tube, while sometimes filaments may also be attached to their neighbors. Filaments carry nectaries. The anthers stand upright, with pollen freed from a slit at the top. The style is thread-like without hairs, sticking out above the corolla tube, while the stigma at its tip is club-shaped or split in two. The ovary consists of two carpels with only one ovule, which is pendulous and anatropous. The fruit is an achene, with a persistent calyx which may consists of spines, contains one seed that is only enclosed by a thin pericarp and has fleshy endosperm. The sepals may be free or fused calyx lobes, sometimes spine-like and woody on the outside. Fruits may be dispersed separately when ripe or can remain on the floral base that breaks free of the plant.

=== Differences with related families ===
Both Calyceraceae and Asteraceae have their flowers set in heads with a common floral base. The bracts surrounding the flowerhead in the Calyceraceae are leaf-like while the involucral bracts in the Asteraceae differ clearly from the leaves. The anthers are free in the Calyceraceae and form a tube in the Asteraceae. The filaments in the Calyceraceae are, at least in their lower third, fused to the corolla, whereas in the Asteraceae the filaments are free or rarely connected (e.g. in Barnadesia).

Both Calyceraceae and Dipsacaceae have persistent calyces, but these become lignified or spiny in Calyceraceae, but are cup-shaped or consist of a circle of hairs in the Dipsacaceae. Stamens are alternating with the corolla lobes and anthers open at their top in the Calyceraceae whereas stamens are centered on the petals and anthers open toward the middle of the flower in the Dipsacaceae.

== Genera ==
Eight genera are accepted:

- Acicarpha Juss. – 7 species, Peru and northeastern Brazil to northern Argentina
- Anachoretes S.Denham & Pozner – 1 species, northwestern Argentina
- Asynthema S.Denham & Pozner – 1 species, Argentina and central Chile
- Boopis Juss. (synonym Leucocera Turcz.) – 8 species, Argentina and Chile
- Calycera Cav. – 6 species, Peru and southern Brazil to southern Argentina
- Gamocarpha DC. – 13 species, Argentina and Chile
- Moschopsis Phil. – 10 species, Argentina and Chile
- Xiphodesma Pozner & Zijlstra – 1 species, Argentina and Uruguay

== Distribution ==
The majority of species in this family occur in Argentina, seven of which are endemics, with the highest species density south of the tropics. Calycera (eleven species) and Acicarpha (five species) both are widespread along the Andes from northern Argentina through to the Altiplano of Peru. Most of the thirteen species of Boopsis occur in the south of Argentina and Chile but some species are found in the tropics. Moschopsis grows in the Salta Province in Argentina. Acicarpha tribuloides occurs as an introduced weed along roads in Florida.
