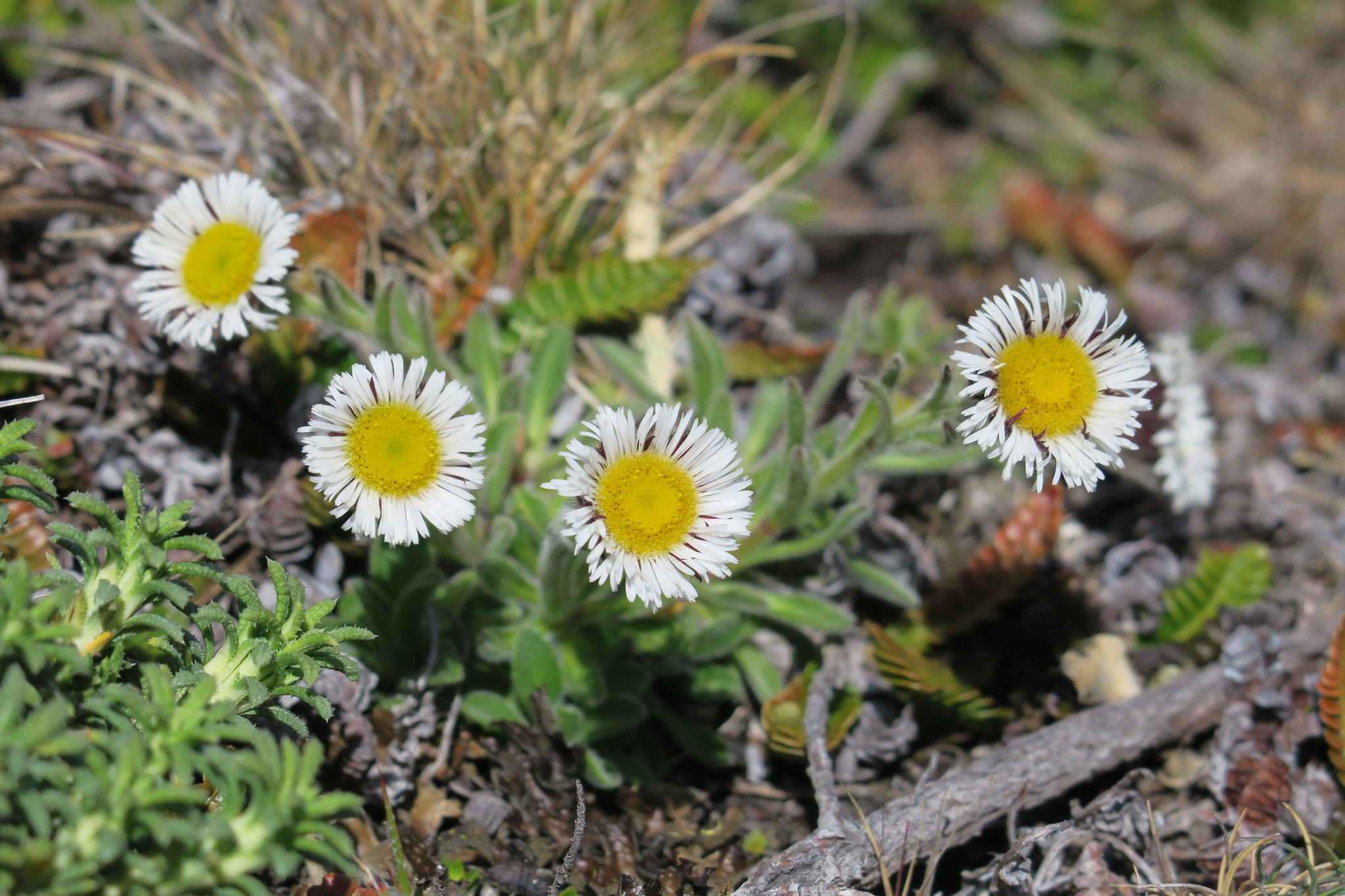
- E. incertus in the Falkland Islands

Conservation status
- Endangered (IUCN 3.1)

Scientific classification
- Kingdom: Plantae
- Clade: Tracheophytes
- Clade: Angiosperms
- Clade: Eudicots
- Clade: Asterids
- Order: Asterales
- Family: Asteraceae
- Genus: Erigeron
- Species: E. incertus

Binomial name
- Erigeron incertus (d'Urv.) Skottsb.

= Erigeron incertus =

Species of flowering plant

Erigeron incertus, the hairy daisy, is a species of flowering plant in the family Asteraceae. It is found only in the Falkland Islands. Its natural habitat is temperate shrubland. It is threatened by habitat loss.
