= S. maxima =

S. maxima may refer to:

- Sagina maxima, a plant native to western North America
- Sarangesa maxima, an African butterfly
- Shorea maxima, a plant endemic to Malaysia
- Solandra maxima, a vine endemic to Central America
- Sterna maxima, a New World tern
