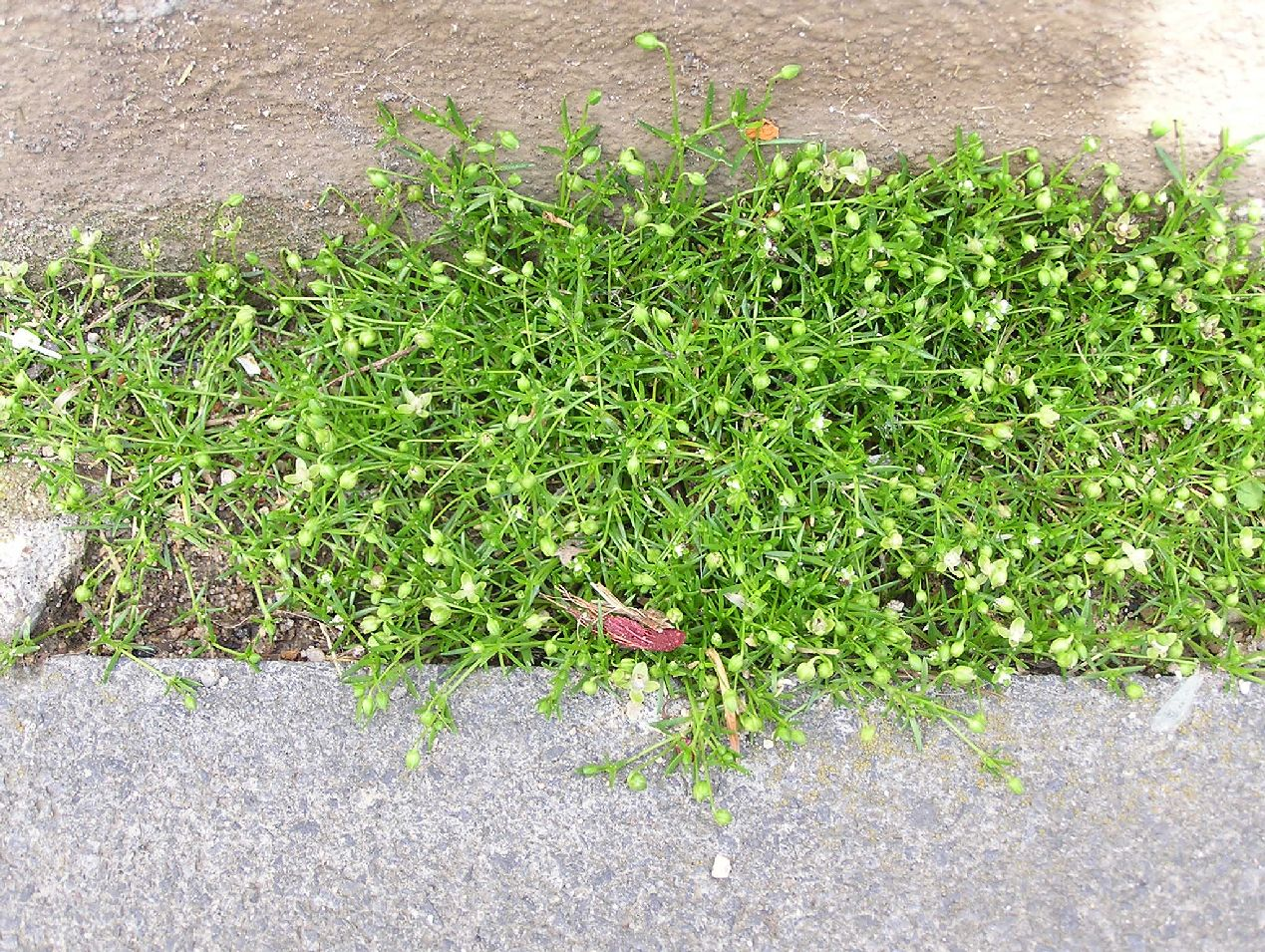
- Sagina procumbens

Scientific classification
- Kingdom: Plantae
- Clade: Tracheophytes
- Clade: Angiosperms
- Clade: Eudicots
- Order: Caryophyllales
- Family: Caryophyllaceae
- Genus: Sagina; L.

Type species
- Sagina procumbens L.

= Sagina =

Genus of flowering plants

Sagina (like Colobanthus called "pearlworts") is a genus of 20–30 species of flowering plants in the family Caryophyllaceae. These are flowering herbs native to temperate regions of the Northern Hemisphere extending south to tropical mountain areas at high altitudes, reaching just south of the equator in Africa. They are small annual or perennial herbaceous plants, growing to 5–15 cm. The leaves are opposite, often in tight whorl-like clusters, simple linear, typically 5–20 mm long. The flowers are solitary or in small cymes, with four or five green sepals and an equal number of white petals; the petal size relative to the sepal size is useful in species identification. The fruit is a small capsule containing several seeds.

== Species ==
The following species are accepted by The Plant List:

- Sagina abyssinica Hochst. ex A. Rich.
- Sagina afroalpina Hedberg
- Sagina apetala Ard.
- Sagina caespitosa Lange
- Sagina chilensis Naudin
- Sagina decumbens (Elliott) Torr. & A.Gray
- Sagina glabra (Willd.) Fenzl
- Sagina graminifolia Wedd.
- Sagina humifusa (Cambess.) Fenzl ex Rohrbach in Martius
- Sagina japonica (Sw.) Ohwi
- Sagina maritima G.Don
- Sagina maxima A. Gray
- Sagina micropetala Rauschert
- Sagina nivalis (Lindblad) Fr.
- Sagina nodosa (L.) Fenzl
- Sagina × normaniana Lagerh.
- Sagina pilifera (DC.) Fenzl
- Sagina procumbens L.
- Sagina sabuletorum (J.Gay) Lange
- Sagina saginoides (L.) H.Karst.
- Sagina stridii Kit Tan, Zarkos & Christodoulou
- Sagina subulata (Sw.) C.Presl
