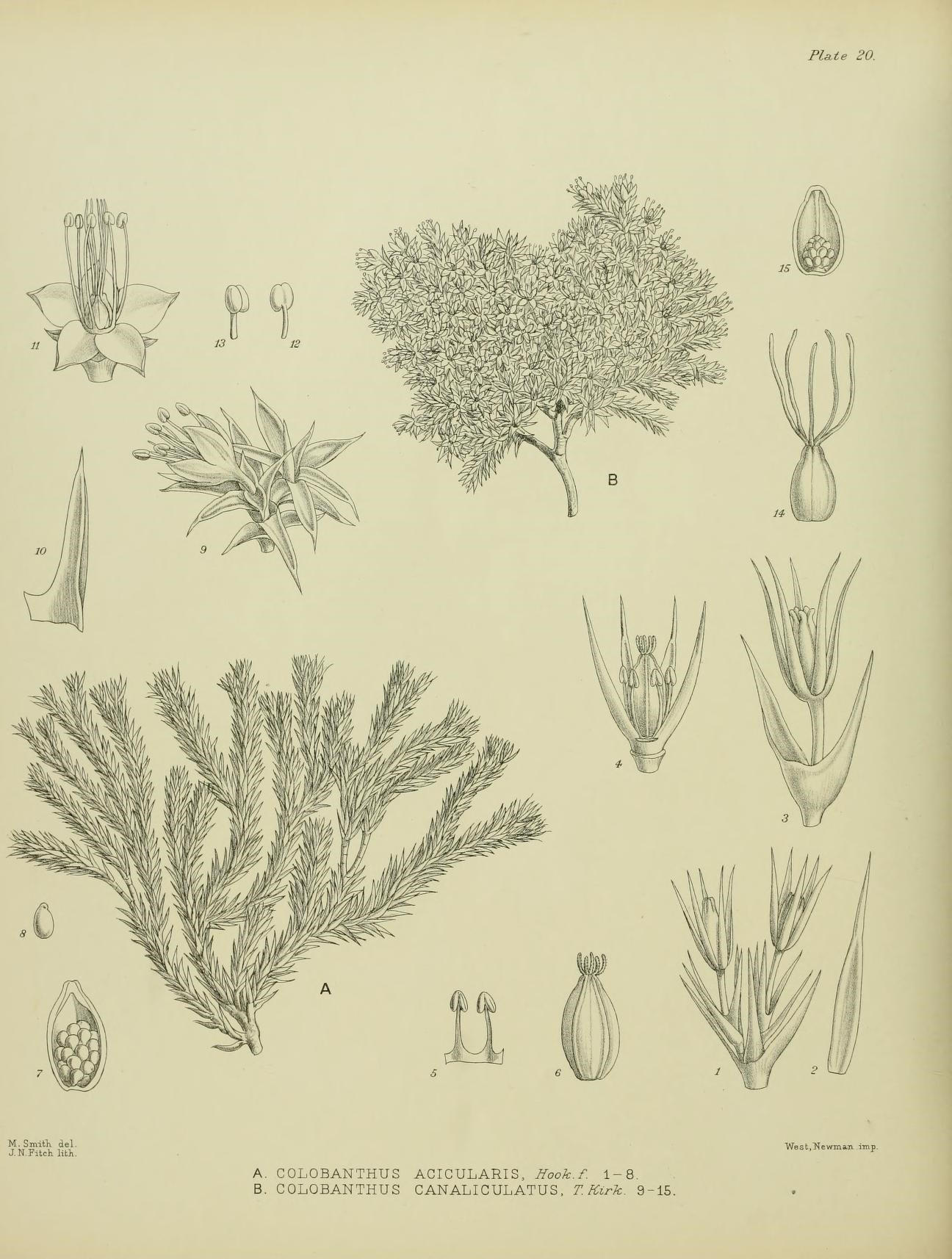
- Fig. 9-15

Scientific classification
- Kingdom: Plantae
- Clade: Embryophytes
- Clade: Tracheophytes
- Clade: Angiosperms
- Clade: Eudicots
- Order: Caryophyllales
- Family: Caryophyllaceae
- Genus: Colobanthus
- Species: C. canaliculatus

Binomial name
- Colobanthus canaliculatus Kirk

= Colobanthus canaliculatus =

Species of plant

Colobanthus canaliculatus is a herbaceous alpine dicot belonging to the family Caryophyllaceae. It is a lithophytic cushion plant native to South Island, New Zealand, unusual for two reasons; it has green flowers; and the roots are fully exposed to the air and of a weeping habit.
