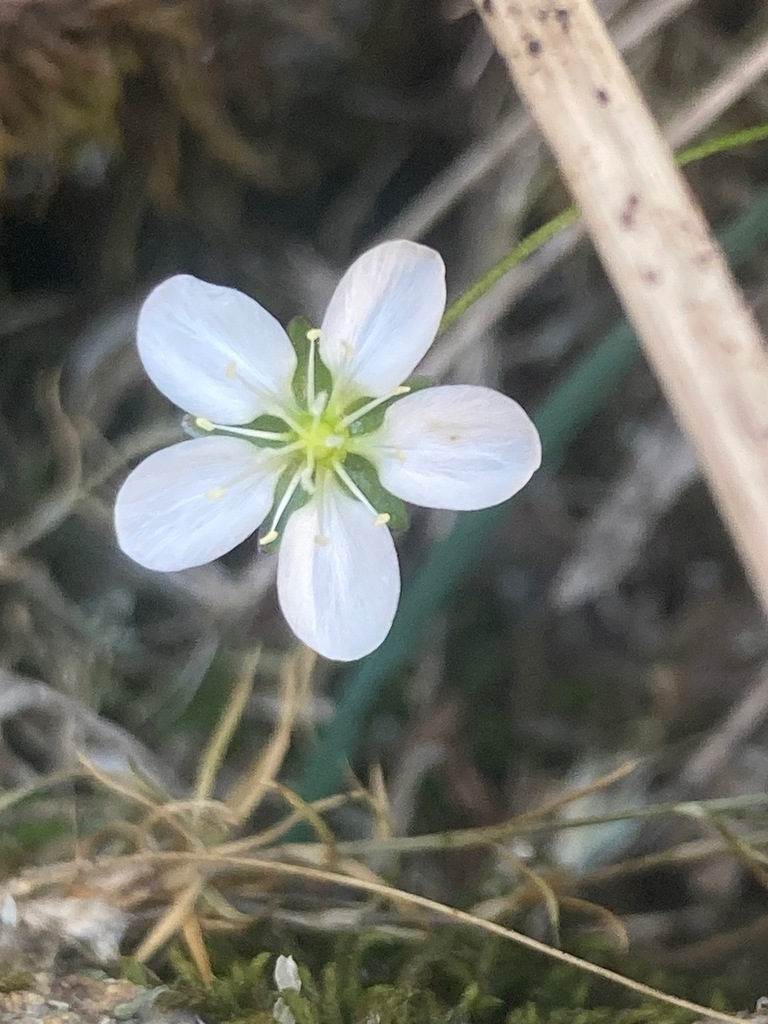

Scientific classification
- Kingdom: Plantae
- Clade: Tracheophytes
- Clade: Angiosperms
- Clade: Eudicots
- Order: Caryophyllales
- Family: Caryophyllaceae
- Genus: Sagina
- Species: S. pilifera

Binomial name
- Sagina pilifera (DC.) Fenzl

Synonyms
- Spergula pilifera DC.

= Sagina pilifera =

Species of flowering plant

Sagina pilifera is a species of Sagina, native (and endemic) to the Mediterranean islands of Corsica and Sardinia, where it grows in mountains at altitudes of 1,000–2,700 m. It is a prostrate herbaceous plant growing to 2–8 cm tall, with white flowers 1 cm in diameter.

Plants from northwestern Europe reported as this species are based on misidentification of Sagina subulata.
