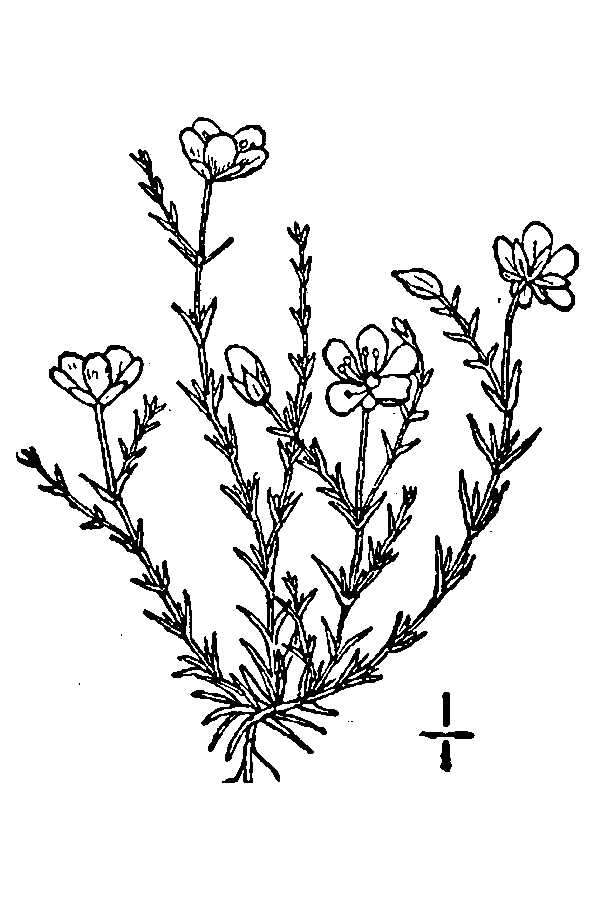

Conservation status
- Secure (NatureServe)

Scientific classification
- Kingdom: Plantae
- Clade: Tracheophytes
- Clade: Angiosperms
- Clade: Eudicots
- Order: Caryophyllales
- Family: Caryophyllaceae
- Genus: Sagina
- Species: S. nodosa

Binomial name
- Sagina nodosa (L.) Fenzl

= Sagina nodosa =

Knotted pearlwort

Species of flowering plant

Sagina nodosa, the knotted pearlwort, is a species in the genus Sagina, native to northern Europe. It is a low-growing plant up to 15 cm tall, with paired leaves up to 1 cm long. The flowers are 5–10 mm diameter, with five white petals.
