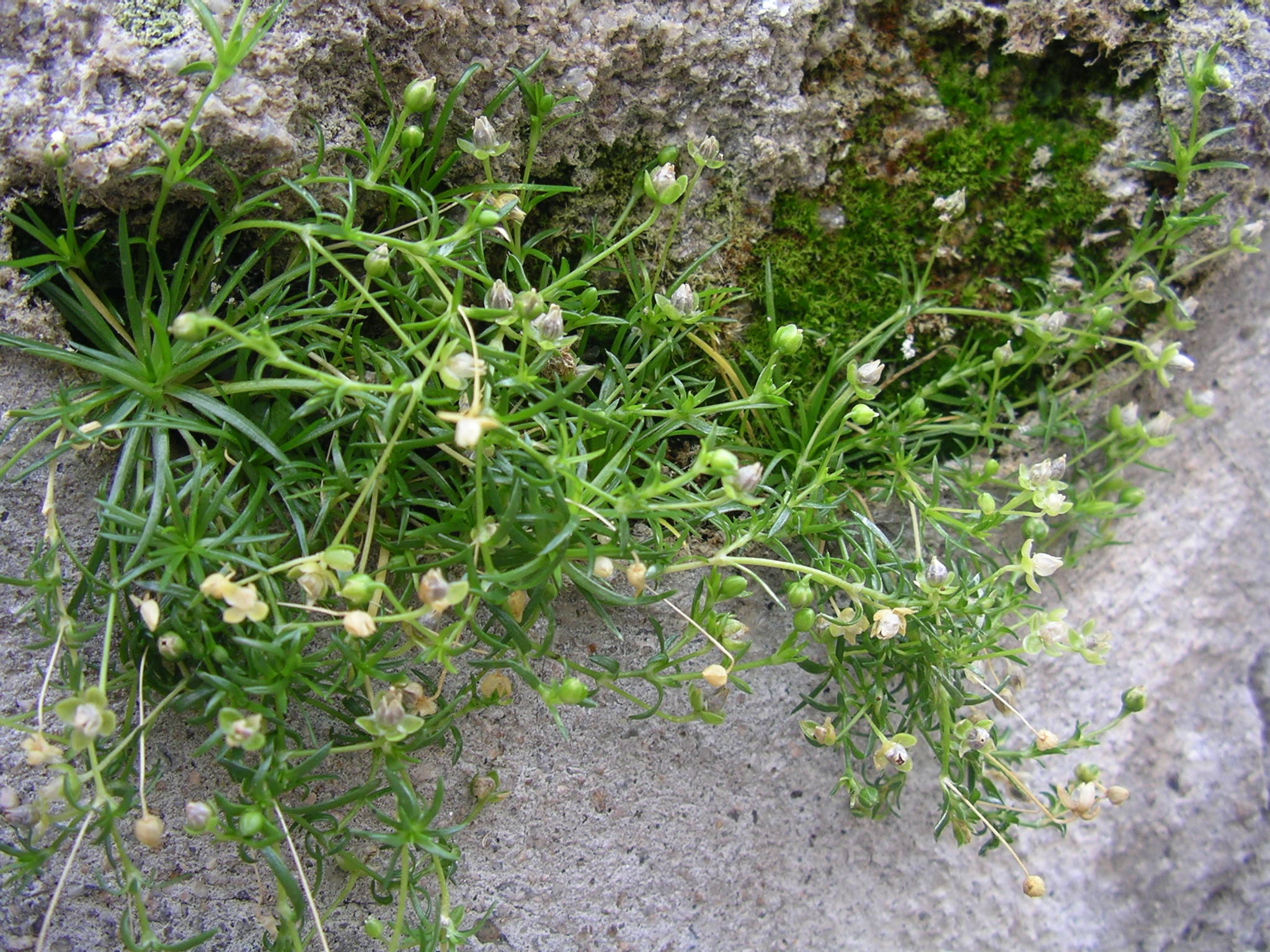

Scientific classification
- Kingdom: Plantae
- Clade: Tracheophytes
- Clade: Angiosperms
- Clade: Eudicots
- Order: Caryophyllales
- Family: Caryophyllaceae
- Genus: Sagina
- Species: S. procumbens

Binomial name
- Sagina procumbens L.

= Sagina procumbens =

Species of flowering plant

Sagina procumbens (procumbent pearlwort) is a species of flowering plant in the family Caryophyllaceae, native throughout Europe, most of western and central Asia, and northwest Africa. It is a common weed in many environments, and can be found in wild and disturbed habitat, especially moist areas. It can frequently be seen growing in lawns or in cracks in pavements, particularly in block paving, where it resists human trampling well, and is also common in flower pots.

== Description ==
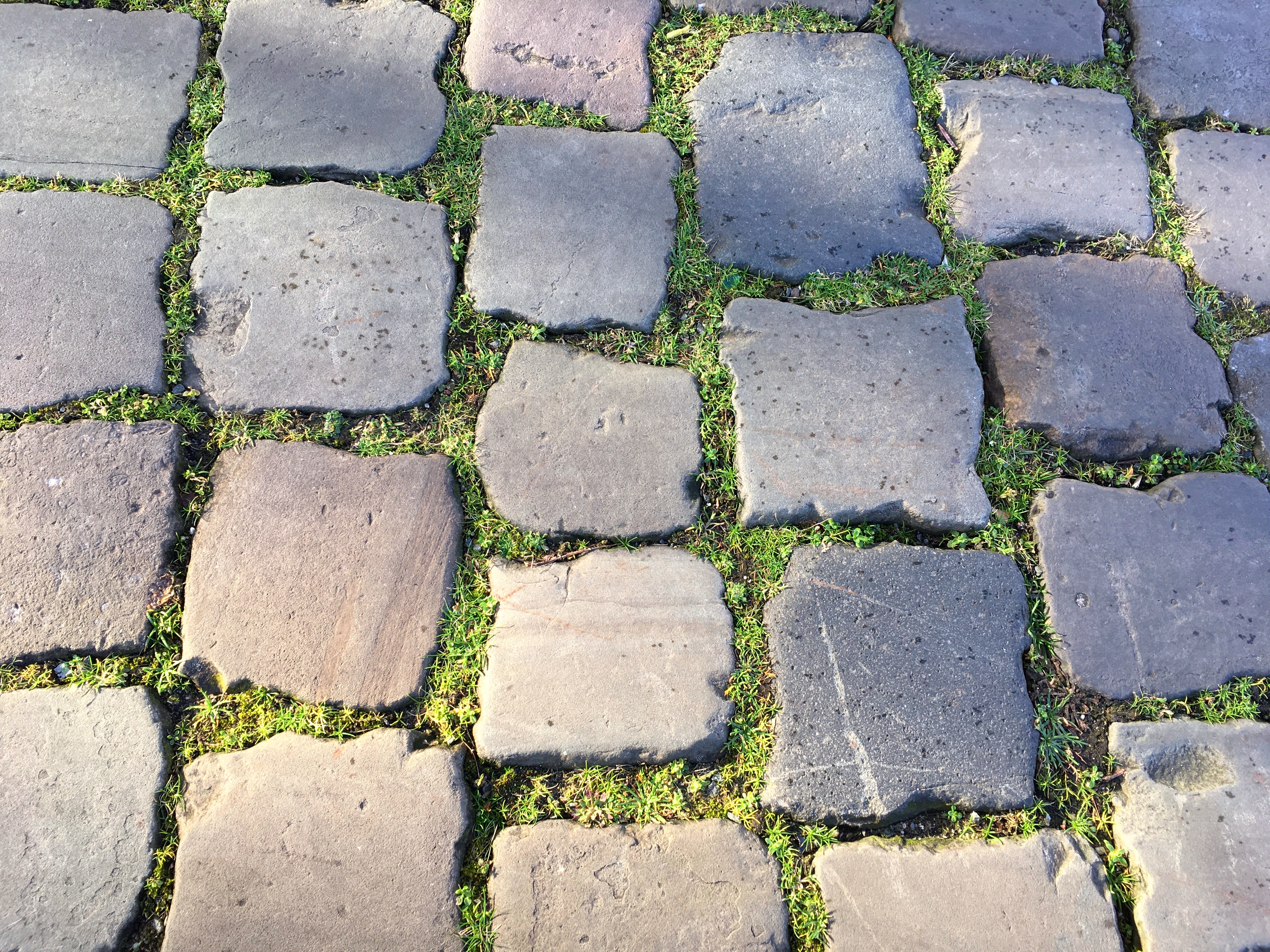
Sagina procumbens growing in block paving, Leiden, Netherlands

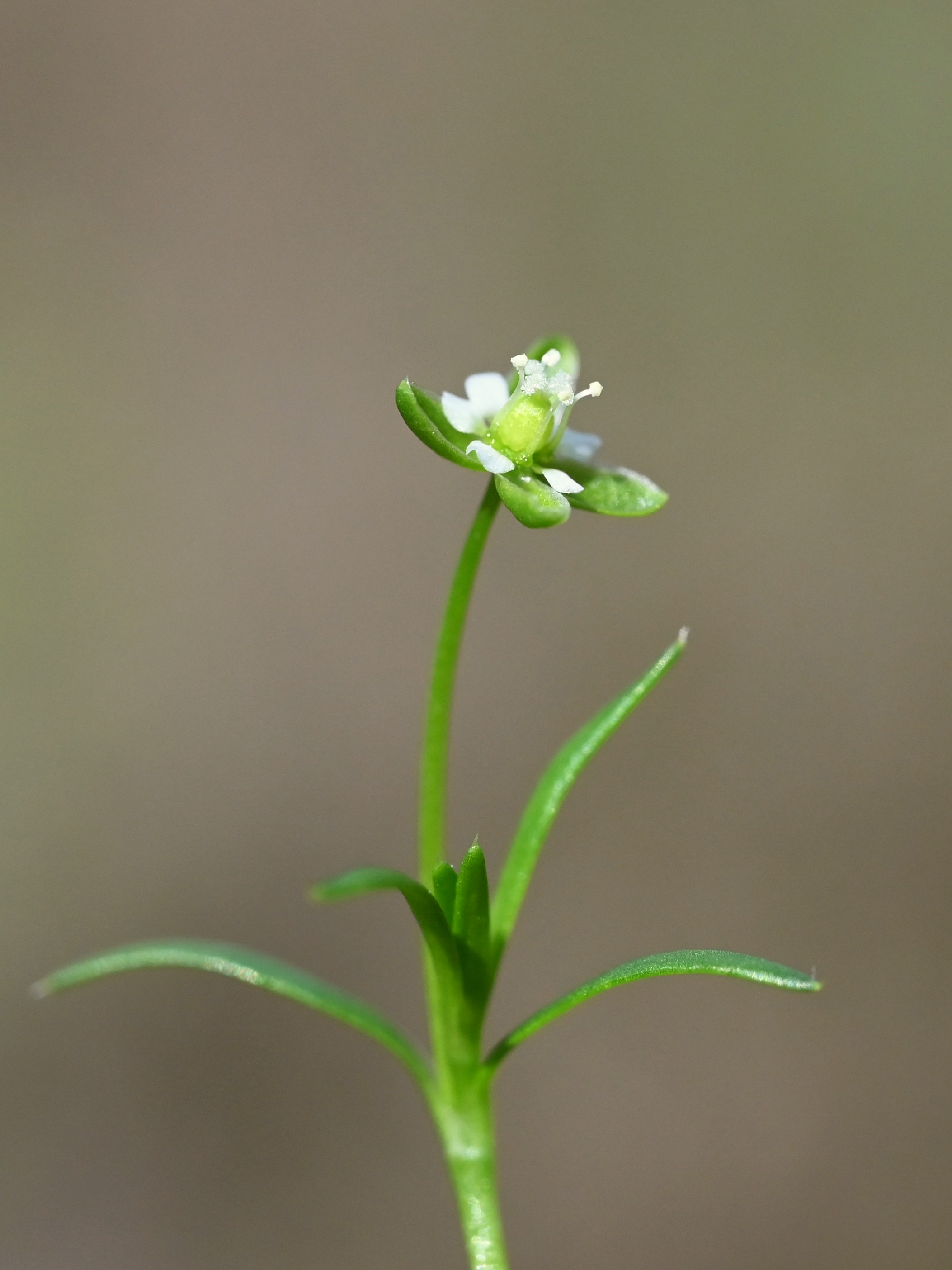
A single Sagina procumbens flower.

It is a perennial ground-hugging herb forming clumps or mats of hairless green herbage, sometimes vaguely resembling a patch of moss. The stems root readily at the stem nodes, enabling it to spread widely by vegetative reproduction. The leaves are linear, and up to 1–2 cm long. The inflorescence is a solitary, minute flower with four or five sepals and four or five small white petals, but the petals are sometimes absent; they have 4 free stigmas. The fruit is a small capsule which releases black seeds.

== As an invasive species ==
Outside of its native range, it can be found widely across much of North and South America, and locally in northeast Asia. In 1998 numerous well-developed plants were found on the UNESCO World Heritage Site of Gough Island, where it is an introduced species. Given the island's remoteness, seeds were most likely introduced from visitors' footwear and/or clothing. Without control the plant will very likely transform the ecosystem of the island's uplands, as it has already done on the Prince Edward Islands, where it has spread at a rate of 100 m to 300 m per year and is now considered beyond control. Eradication programs on Gough Island are expected to require years of 'concerted effort'. By 2010, through removing plants manually with some soil and then treating the area with boiling water, it had been restricted to one small area of coastal cliffs. As a result, the seed load had been reduced in a decade by 3 orders of magnitude. This nevertheless could result in 200 plants germinating per square metre. To reduce the population further, a study indicated that a combination of soil removal and herbicide could be effective.

== Role in myths, magic and legends of Great Britain ==
It is said to have been the first plant on which Christ set his foot when he came to Earth, or when he rose from the dead. In the highlands of Scotland it was supposed to have derived supernatural powers from having been blessed by Christ, St Bride and St Columba. A spray of it hung from the door lintel gave protection against fairies, especially those who made a practise of taking people away. If pearlwort were stuck in a bull's fore-hooves, the cows with which it mated and the calves and the milk they produced were safeguarded from ills. If a cow ate the herb, its calves and milk, and all who drank the milk, were also protected against fairies. For the young village maiden, pearlwort brought a bonus. If drunk in an infusion, or used merely to wet the lips, it would attract her favoured lover, and if a piece of it were in the girl's mouth when she kissed him, he was bound to her for ever.

== Etymology ==
Sagina means 'fodder'; the genus was named after a fodder plant, spurrey, which has since been moved into its own genus, Spergula. The species name procumbens means 'procumbent', 'lying flat on the ground' The English name 'pearlwort' is first known from John Ray's 1660 Catalogus plantarum: 151; he did not explain its origin or derivation.

Other recorded names include "birdeye pearlwort" and "matted pearlwort".
