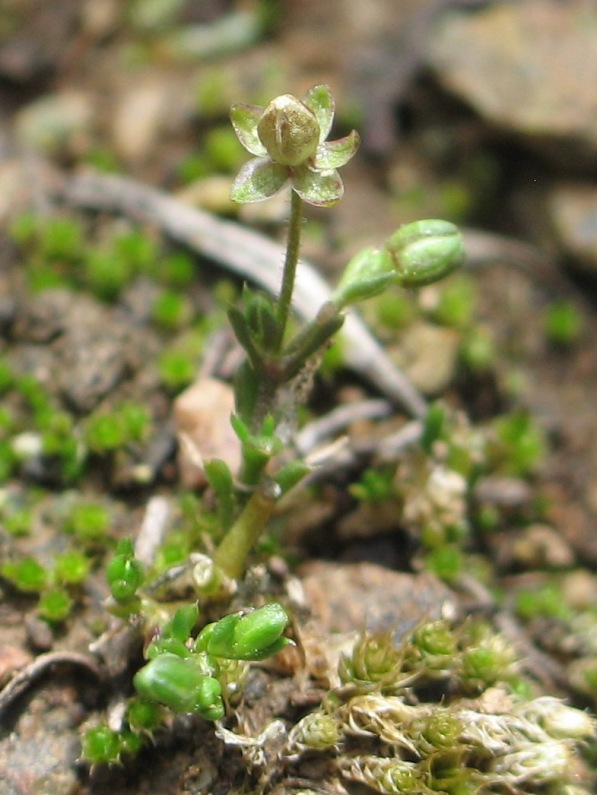

Scientific classification
- Kingdom: Plantae
- Clade: Tracheophytes
- Clade: Angiosperms
- Clade: Eudicots
- Order: Caryophyllales
- Family: Caryophyllaceae
- Genus: Sagina
- Species: S. apetala

Binomial name
- Sagina apetala Ard.

= Sagina apetala =

Species of flowering plant

Sagina apetala is a species of flowering plant in the family Caryophyllaceae known by the common names annual pearlwort and dwarf pearlwort. It is native to Europe and it is known elsewhere as an introduced species, including parts of North America. It grows in many types of disturbed habitat, such as cracks in the sidewalk. It is a petite annual herb producing a threadlike stem just a few centimeters long, spreading or growing erect. The plant is glandular and somewhat hairy. The leaves are linear in shape and not more than about a centimeter long. The inflorescence is a solitary flower borne on a threadlike pedicel. The flower has usually four sepals and generally no petals.

== Gallery ==
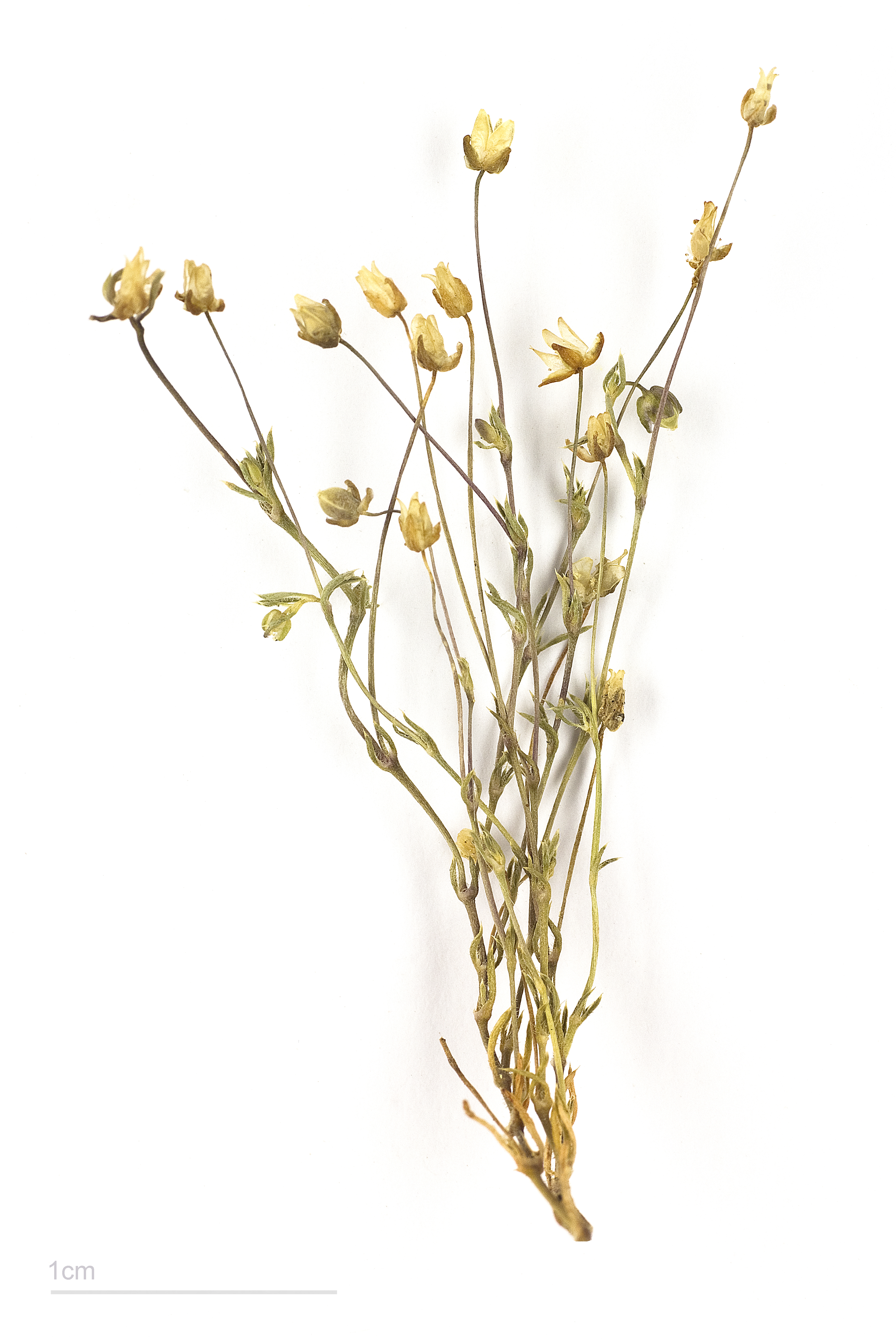
Sagina apetala - MHNT

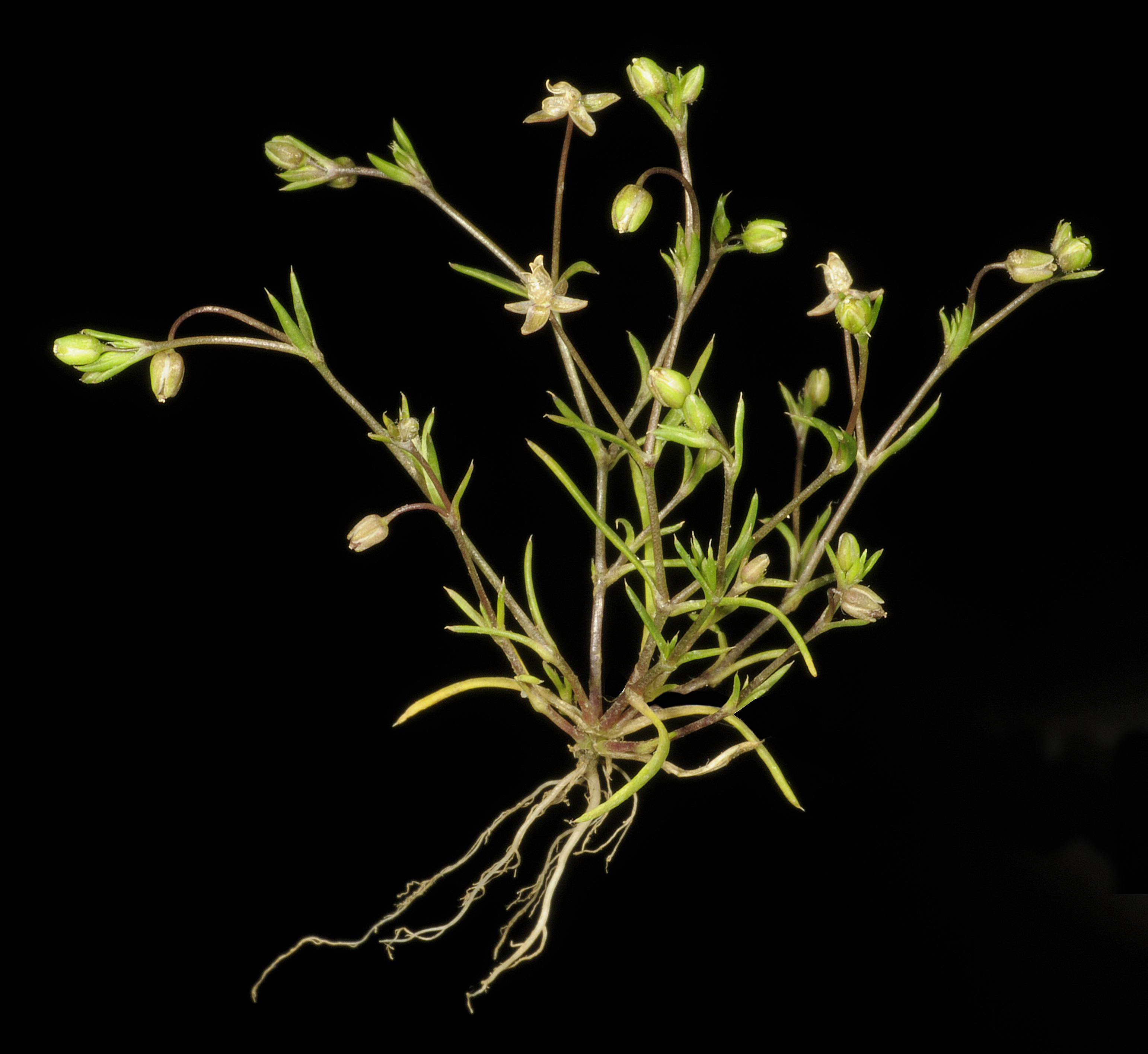
Whole plant

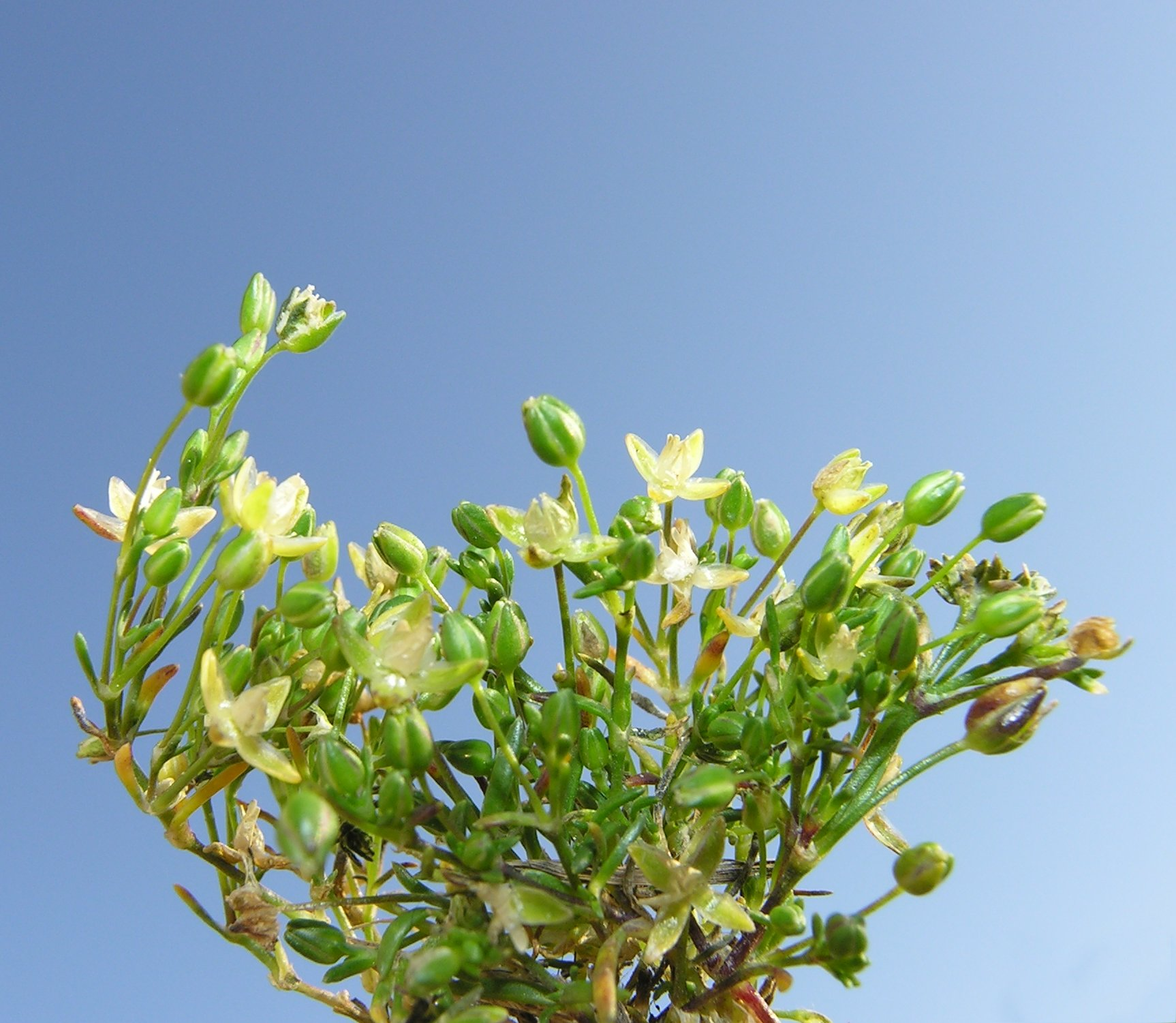
Inflorescence
