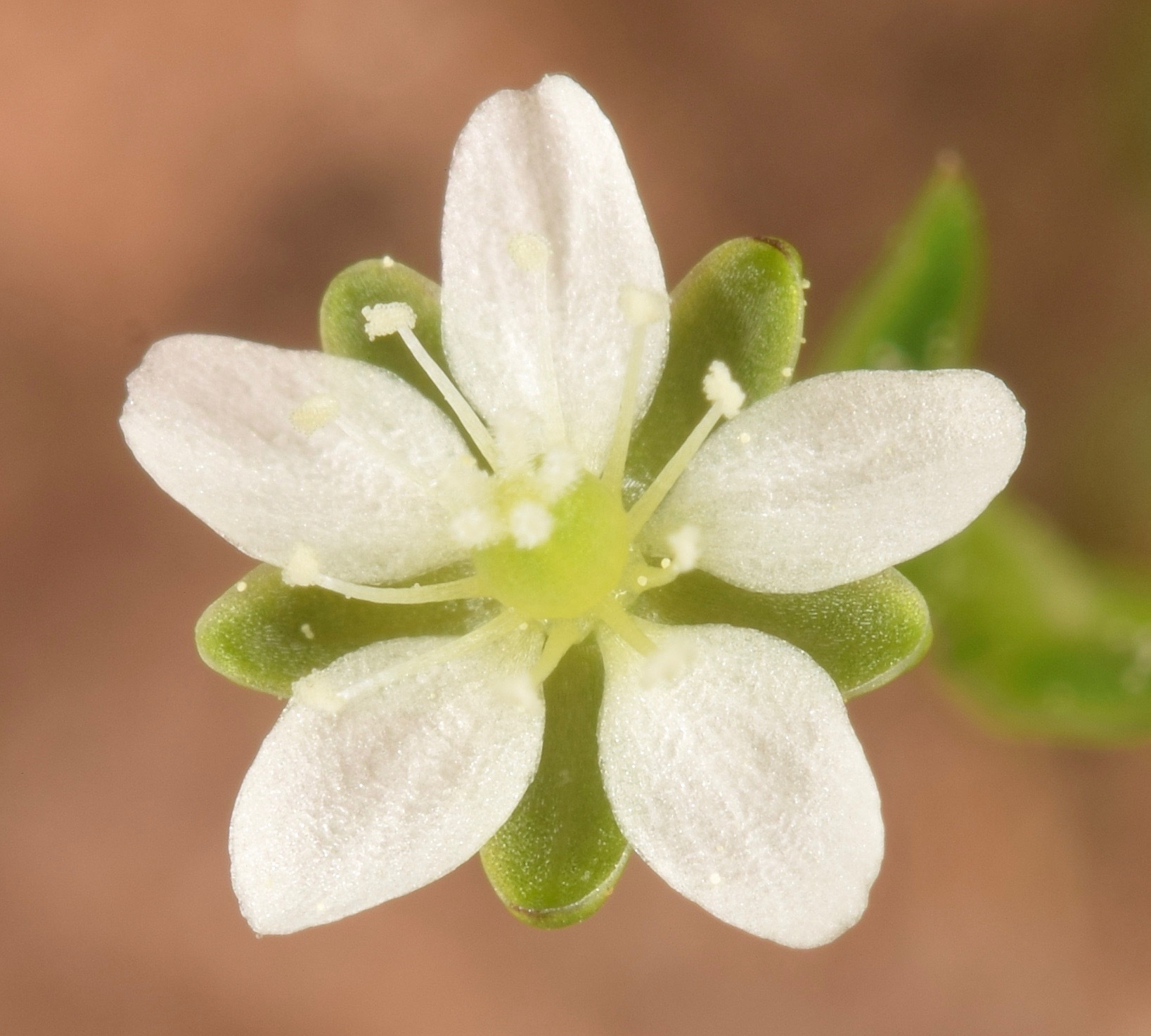

Scientific classification
- Kingdom: Plantae
- Clade: Tracheophytes
- Clade: Angiosperms
- Clade: Eudicots
- Order: Caryophyllales
- Family: Caryophyllaceae
- Genus: Sagina
- Species: S. decumbens

Binomial name
- Sagina decumbens (Elliott) Torr. & A.Gray

= Sagina decumbens =

Species of flowering plant

Sagina decumbens is a species of flowering plant in the family Caryophyllaceae known by the common names trailing pearlwort and western pearlwort. It is native to several areas of North America, where it can be found in many types of habitat. It is a small annual herb producing a threadlike green or purplish stem growing erect or trailing, measuring up to about 16 centimeters long. The leaves are hairless, linear in shape, and one half to two centimeters long. The inflorescence is a solitary flower borne on a threadlike pedicel. The flower has usually five sepals and five tiny white petals. There are two subspecies which differ mainly in the microscopic appearance of the seeds.
