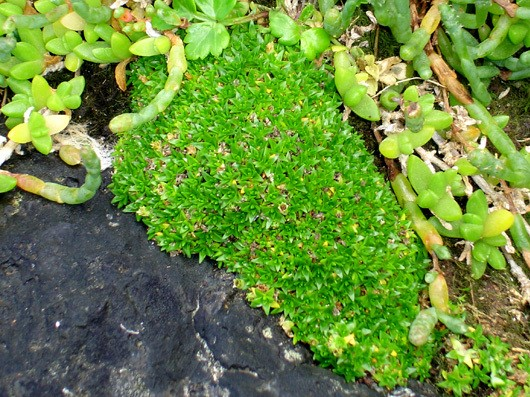
- With Disphyma papillatum

Scientific classification
- Kingdom: Plantae
- Clade: Tracheophytes
- Clade: Angiosperms
- Clade: Eudicots
- Order: Caryophyllales
- Family: Caryophyllaceae
- Genus: Colobanthus
- Species: C. muscoides

Binomial name
- Colobanthus muscoides Hook.f.

= Colobanthus muscoides =

Species of flowering plant

Colobanthus muscoides is a low-growing, moss-like flowering cushion plant in the family Caryophyllaceae, found on islands in the south-western Pacific Ocean, especially in the subantarctic region. The specific epithet comes from the Latin muscus (moss) and -oides (resembling), with reference to its growth habit.

== Description ==
Colobanthus muscoides is a perennial herb that forms a dense mat or cushion up to 250 mm thick and sometimes up to several metres across. The slender, freely branching stems have adventitious roots. The leaves are linear and fleshy, 3–5 mm long and 0.8–1 mm wide. The flowers occur at the ends of short shoots in the upper leaf axils, with both flowers and fruits overtopped by the leaves. The cushion form is structured by the densely packed roots, stems and persistent leaf sheaths. The plant flowers from September to March, and fruits from October to May.

== Distribution and habitat ==
The plant is found on New Zealand's Chatham, Snares, Antipodes, Auckland and Campbell Islands, as well as on Australia's Macquarie Island. It is common in coastal areas, where it forms extensive mats in bog communities and grows as cushions on peat, rock and sand in the sea spray zone.
