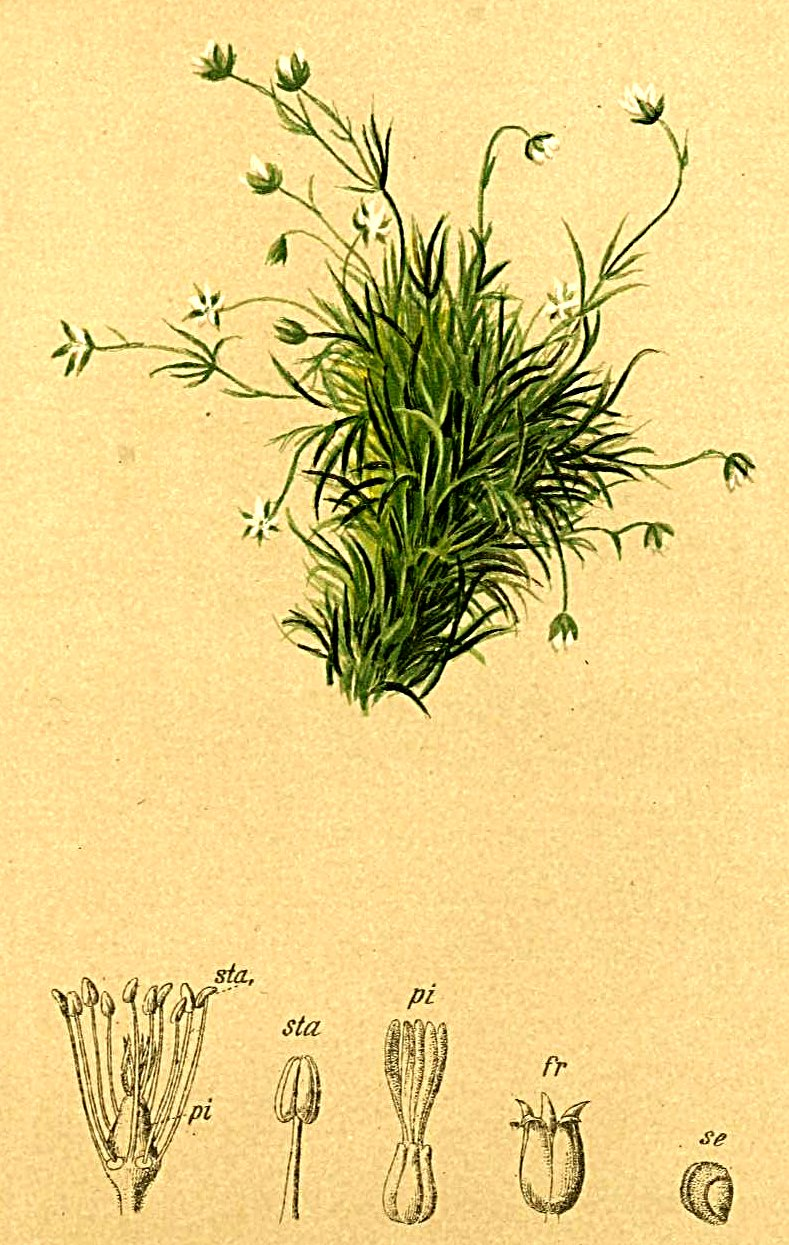

Conservation status
- Secure (NatureServe)

Scientific classification
- Kingdom: Plantae
- Clade: Tracheophytes
- Clade: Angiosperms
- Clade: Eudicots
- Order: Caryophyllales
- Family: Caryophyllaceae
- Genus: Sagina
- Species: S. saginoides

Binomial name
- Sagina saginoides (L.) H.Karst.

= Sagina saginoides =

Species of flowering plant

Sagina saginoides is a species of flowering plant in the family Caryophyllaceae known by the common names arctic pearlwort or alpine pearlwort. It has a circumboreal distribution; it can be found throughout the northern latitudes of the Northern Hemisphere. It grows in subalpine and alpine climates and other mountainous habitat at lower elevations. This is a small perennial herb producing a slender to threadlike stem just a few centimetres long, growing decumbent or erect. It is sometimes clumpy in form. The leaves are linear in shape and about 1 to 2 centimetres in length. The inflorescence is a solitary flower with five sepals and five small white petals.

== Description ==
The alpine pearlwort is a small, tufted perennial plant growing from 3 to 10 centimetres (1.2 to 3.9 in) tall. Its stems are semi-erect and the stalked leaves are in opposite fused pairs with slender linear blades, entire margins and blunt tips. The erect flowering stem bears a globular bud followed by a single regular flower about 2 mm (0.1 in) in diameter. It has five turned back sepals, five white, ovate, blunt petals which are the same length as the sepals, ten stamens and five styles. The fruit is a five-chambered capsule and longer than the calyx. The snow pearlwort (Sagina nivalis) looks very similar but often has four rather than five petals.

== Distribution and habitat ==
The alpine pearlwort has a circumboreal distribution; it can be found throughout the northern latitudes of the Northern Hemisphere and mountainous regions further south. It is found in short turf in thin soils on fell tundra, under snowdrifts, in melt-water wetlands, on ledges on rock faces, rocky banks, meagre pastures, roadside banks and bare ground. During the winter its dwarf stature and covering of snow protect it from the worst of the winds and low temperatures.
