= Sagina stridii =

Scientific classification
- Kingdom: Plantae
- Clade: Tracheophytes
- Clade: Angiosperms
- Clade: Eudicots
- Order: Caryophyllales
- Family: Caryophyllaceae
- Genus: Sagina
- Species: S. stridii

Binomial name
- Sagina stridii Kit Tan, Zarkos & Christodoulou

Species of flowering plant

Sagina stridii is a herbaceous perennial flowering plant in the family Caryophyllaceae. It is a Greek endemic species occurring only at high altitude at Mt. Chelmos and Mt. Killini. It was described as a new species in 2012 and was named after Swedish botanist Arne Strid.
