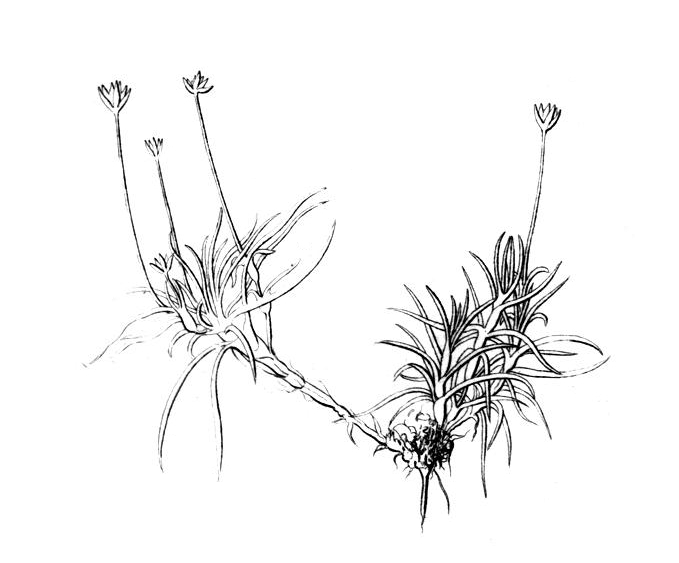
- Colobanthus quitensis

Scientific classification
- Kingdom: Plantae
- Clade: Tracheophytes
- Clade: Angiosperms
- Clade: Eudicots
- Order: Caryophyllales
- Family: Caryophyllaceae
- Genus: Colobanthus; Bartl.

Species
- See text

= Colobanthus =

Genus of flowering plants

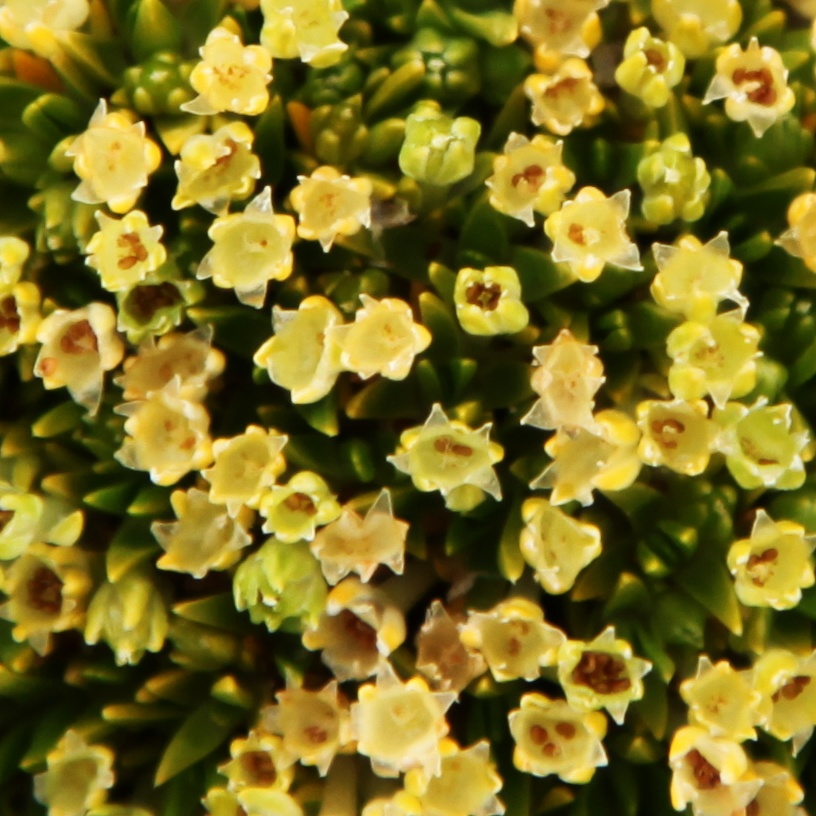
Colobanthus quitensis

Colobanthus is a large genus of small, cushion-like herbaceous plants in the family Caryophyllaceae, sometimes known as "pearlworts", a name they share with plants of the related genus Sagina. C. quitensis is the world's southernmost dicot, and one of only two native extant flowering plants of Antarctica.

== Selected species ==
- Colobanthus acicularis Hook. f.
- Colobanthus affinis (Hook) Hook. f.
- Colobanthus apetalus (Labill.) Druce synonym = Spergula apetala
- Colobanthus bolivianus Pax
- Colobanthus brevisepalus Kirk
- Colobanthus buchananii Kirk
- Colobanthus caespitosus Colenso
- Colobanthus canaliculatus Kirk
- Colobanthus curtisiae J.G. West
- Colobanthus diffusus Hook. f.
- Colobanthus hookeri Cheeseman
- Colobanthus kerguelensis Hook. f.
- Colobanthus lycopodoides Griseb.
- Colobanthus masonae L.B. Moore
- Colobanthus monticola Petrie
- Colobanthus muelleri Kirk = C. billardieri var. brachypoda
- Colobanthus muscoides Hook. f.
- Colobanthus nivicola M. Gray
- Colobanthus pulvinatus F. Muell.
- Colobanthus quitensis (Kunth) Bartl., = C. alatus, C. aretioides, C. billardieri, C. cherlerioides, C. crassifolius, C. crassifolius var. aretioides, C. maclovianus, C. meingeni, C. quitensis var. alatus, C. saginoides, Sagina crassifolia, S. quitensis, Spergula affinis?
- Colobanthus repens Colenso
- Colobanthus squarrosus Cheeseman
- Colobanthus strictus (Cheeseman) Cheeseman
- Colobanthus subulatus (d'Urv.) Hook. f.
- Colobanthus wallii Petrie
