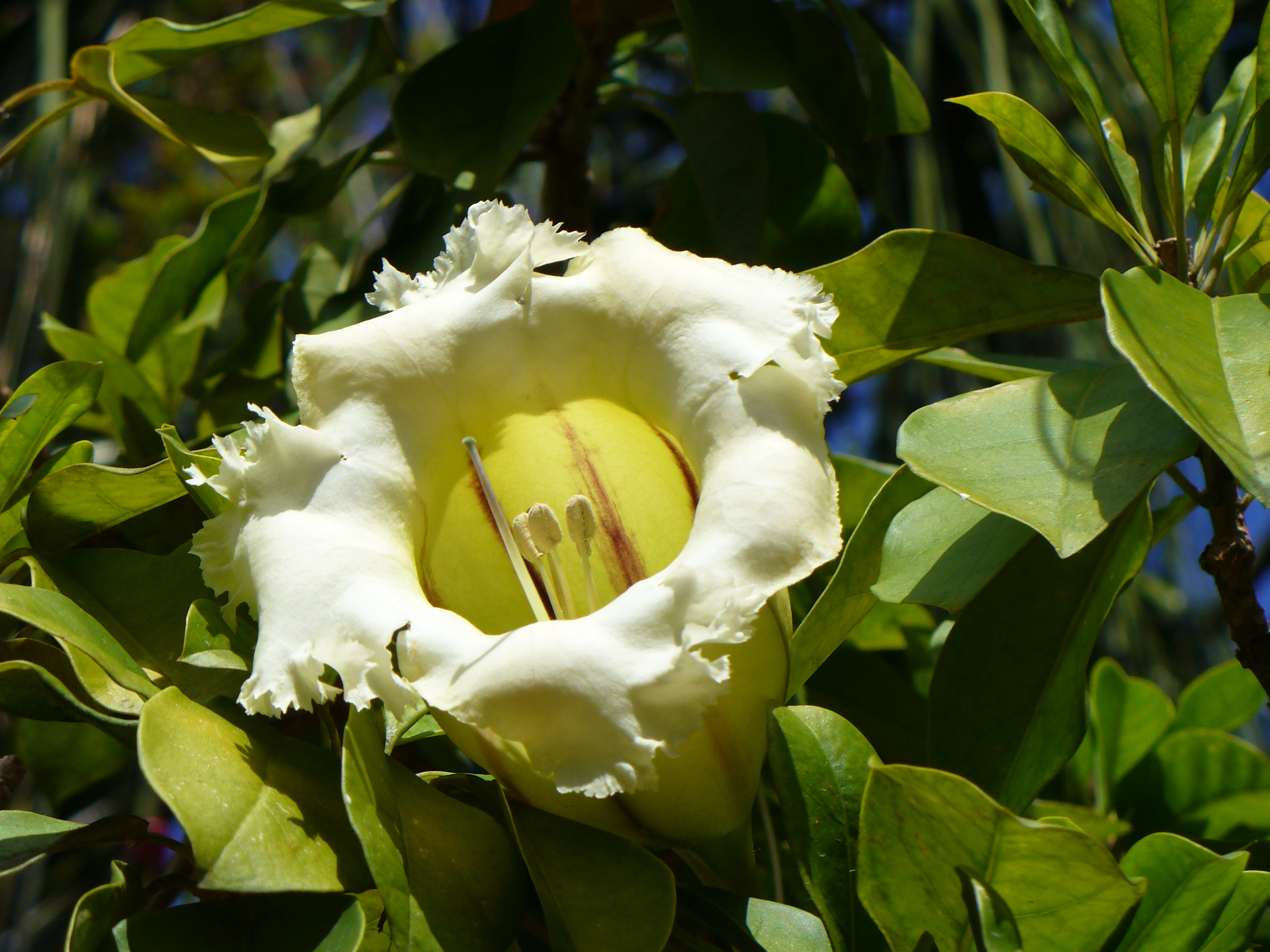

Scientific classification
- Kingdom: Plantae
- Clade: Tracheophytes
- Clade: Angiosperms
- Clade: Eudicots
- Clade: Asterids
- Order: Solanales
- Family: Solanaceae
- Genus: Solandra
- Species: S. grandiflora

Binomial name
- Solandra grandiflora Sw.

= Solandra grandiflora =

Species of plant

Solandra grandiflora, the showy chalicevine, or papaturra is a member of the nightshade (Solanaceae) genus Solandra and, like the other members of the genus, is a climbing plant with large, attractive, trumpet-shaped flowers. It is native to Central America and northern South America and is widely grown in the tropics as an ornamental. The green parts of the plant are highly toxic (hallucinogenic / delirient in small doses), due to tropane alkaloid content, and have caused deaths from anticholinergic poisoning, but the flesh of the ripe fruit (although not the unripe fruit or seeds) is said to be edible. The fruits, which are globular and largely enclosed by the accrescent calyces, can reach a kilogram in weight and have a taste described as apple-like or melon-like.

== Symptoms of poisoning ==
Symptoms caused by ingestion of plant parts - even from chewing fragments of flowers - include dryness of throat, headache, weakness, fever, delirium, hallucinations and potentially fatal circulatory and respiratory failure.

== Gallery ==
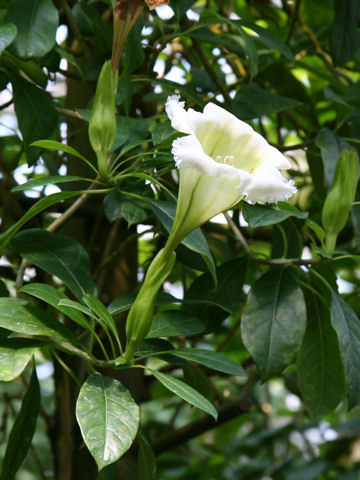
Side view of white-flowered form, showing trumpet shape of corolla.

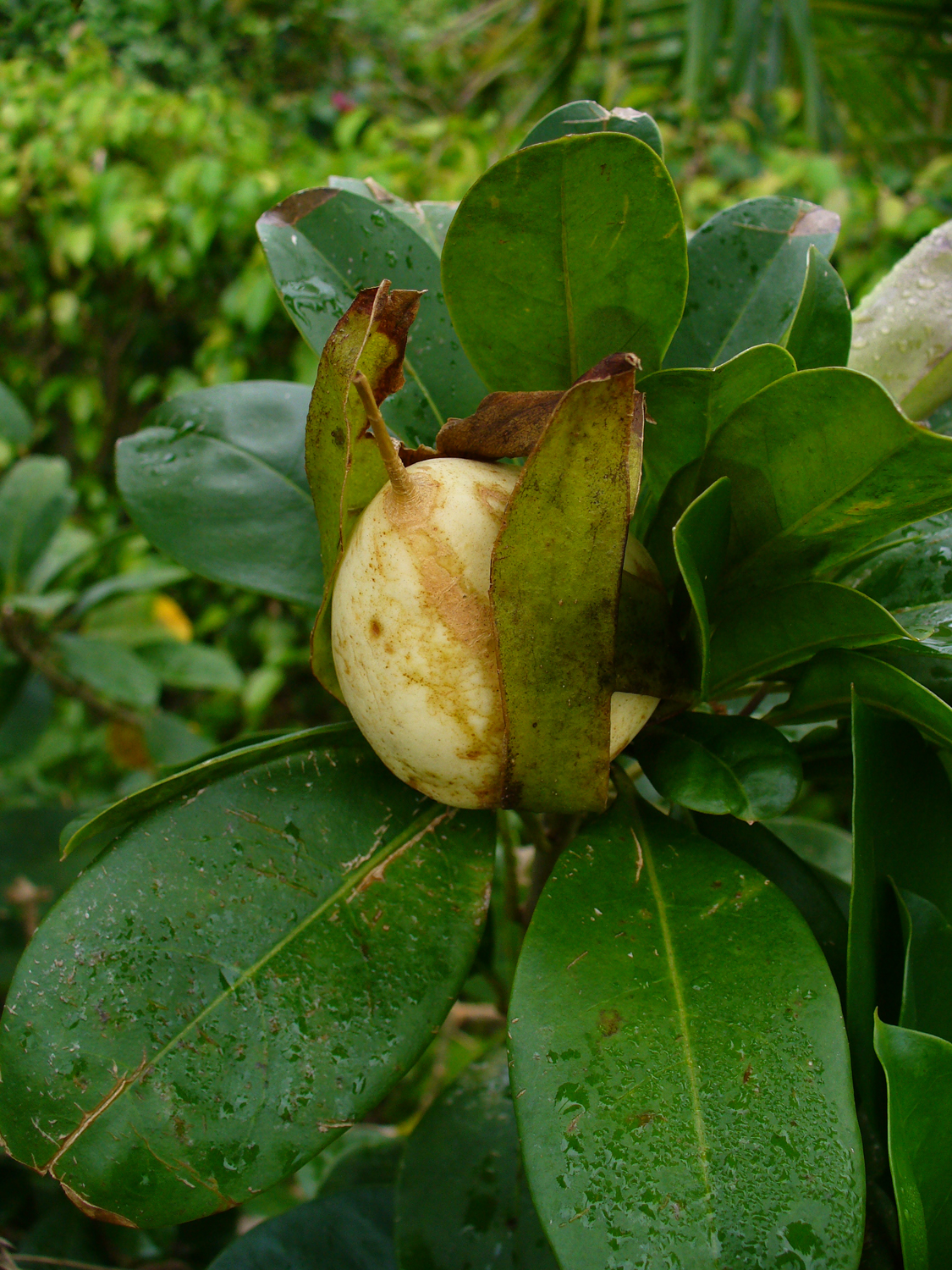
Fruit, showing accrescent calyx. Vernacular name in Central America Papaturra.
