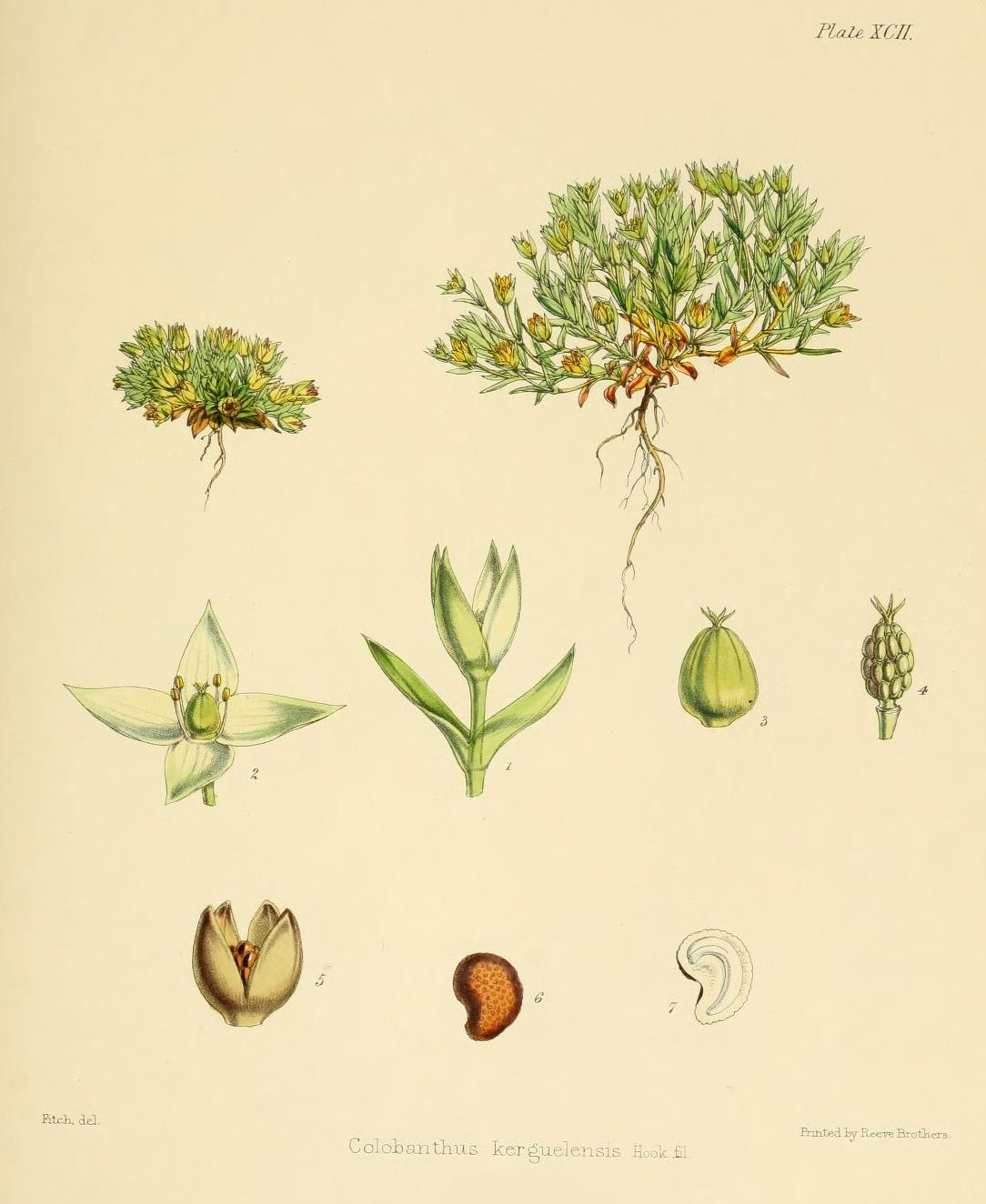

Scientific classification
- Kingdom: Plantae
- Clade: Tracheophytes
- Clade: Angiosperms
- Clade: Eudicots
- Order: Caryophyllales
- Family: Caryophyllaceae
- Genus: Colobanthus
- Species: C. kerguelensis

Binomial name
- Colobanthus kerguelensis Hook.f.

= Colobanthus kerguelensis =

Species of flowering plant

Colobanthus kerguelensis is a low-growing, moss-like flowering cushion plant in the family Caryophyllaceae, found on subantarctic islands in the southern Indian Ocean. The specific epithet refers to the type locality – the Kerguelen Islands.

== Description ==
Colobanthus kerguelensis is a perennial herb that forms loose clumps or cushions up to 65 mm in diameter. The slender, freely branching stems lack adventitious roots. The leaves are linear and fleshy, 5–10 mm long and 2–3.5 mm wide. The flowers are 4-merous, with two large outer sepals, and two smaller inner ones. The plant flowers from December to March, and fruits from March.

== Distribution and habitat ==
As well as on Kerguelen, Colobanthus kerguelensis occurs on the Crozet, Prince Edward, and Heard Islands. It has been recorded from gravel substrates in the supralittoral or sea spray zone, in well-drained peaty and sandy soils with Azorella selago, and in feldmark, up to elevations of 30 m above sea level. It is a pioneer coloniser of recently deglaciated areas.
