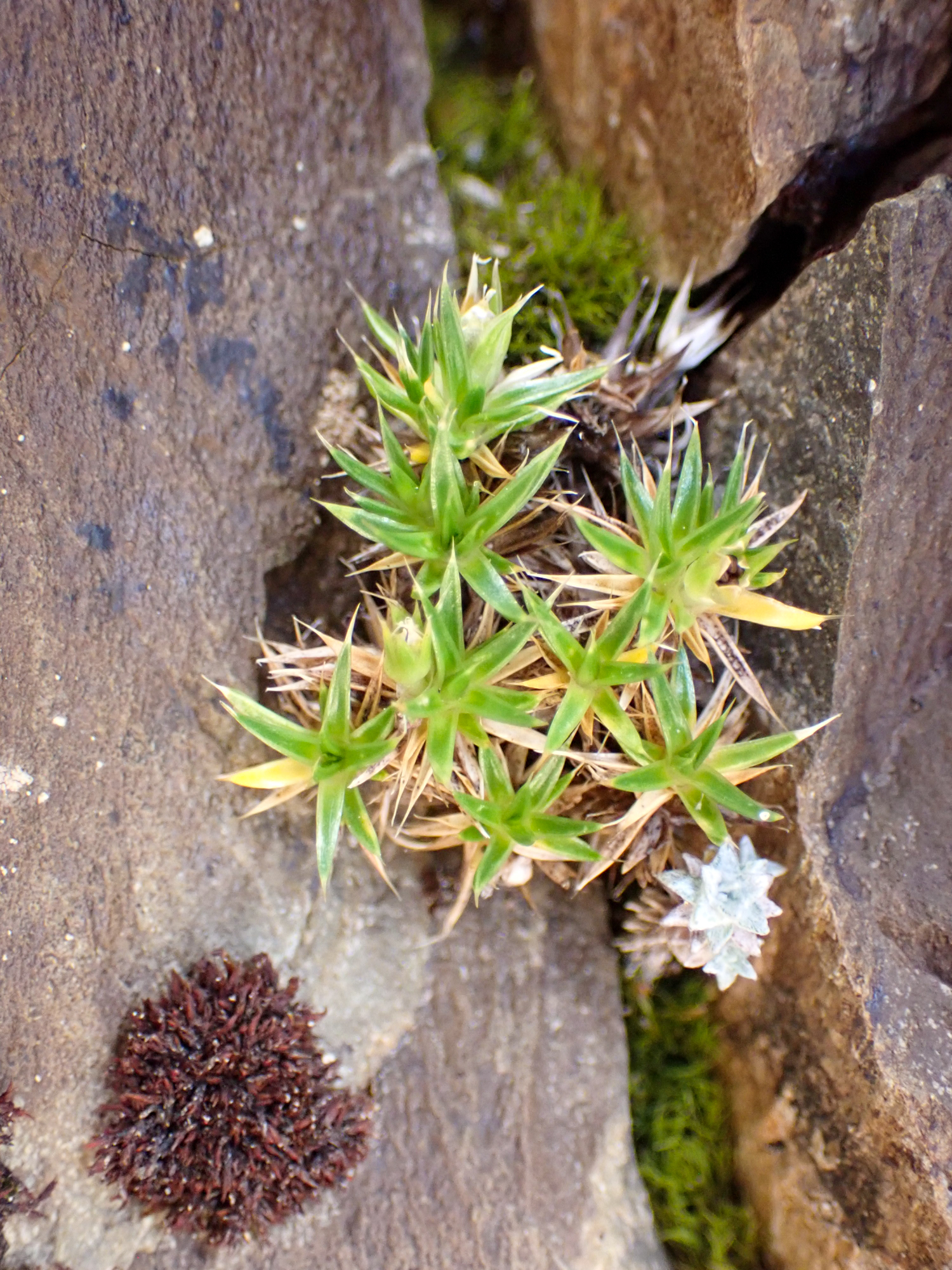
- Colobanthus acicularis in Nelson Lakes National Park

Conservation status
- Not Threatened (NZ TCS)

Scientific classification
- Kingdom: Plantae
- Clade: Embryophytes
- Clade: Tracheophytes
- Clade: Angiosperms
- Clade: Eudicots
- Order: Caryophyllales
- Family: Caryophyllaceae
- Genus: Colobanthus
- Species: C. acicularis

Binomial name
- Colobanthus acicularis Hook.f.

= Colobanthus acicularis =

Species of flowering plant

Colobanthus acicularis is a species of plant, endemic to New Zealand.

== Description ==
A small plant with many branches, and with very sharp blades.

== Distribution and habitat ==
This species is found on both the North and South Island.

== Etymology ==
Acicularis comes from the Latin acicula, which means 'small pin'. It refers to the blade's tapering points.
