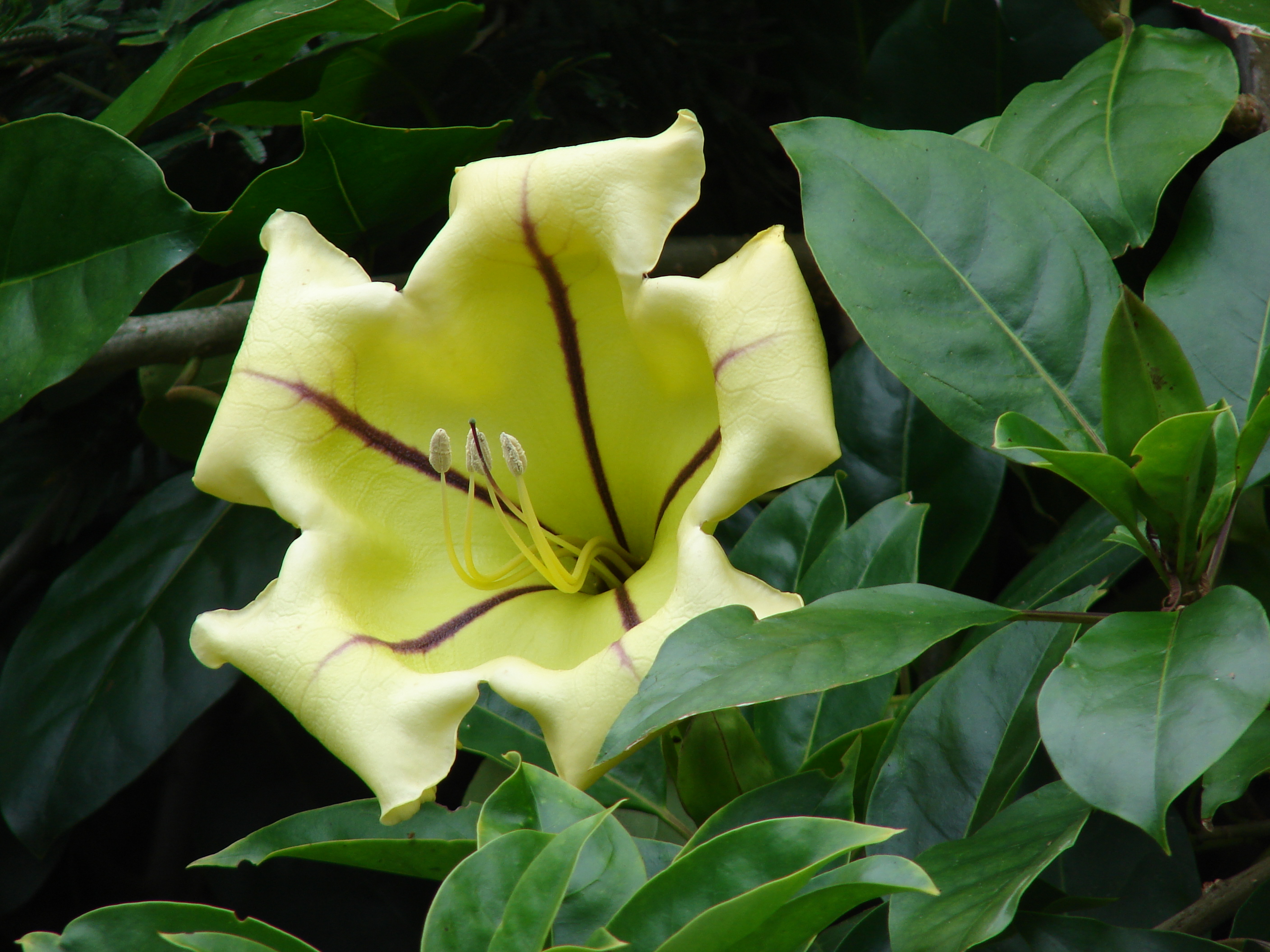
- Solandra maxima

Scientific classification
- Kingdom: Plantae
- Clade: Embryophytes
- Clade: Tracheophytes
- Clade: Spermatophytes
- Clade: Angiosperms
- Clade: Eudicots
- Clade: Asterids
- Order: Solanales
- Family: Solanaceae
- Subfamily: Solanoideae
- Tribe: Solandreae
- Genus: Solandra; Sw.

Species
- See text.

Synonyms
- Swartsia J.F.Gmel.

= Solandra =

Genus of vines

Solandra /soʊˈlændrə/ is a genus of flowering plants in the nightshade family, Solanaceae. It is named after the Swedish naturalist Daniel C. Solander.

The vines it contains are commonly known as chalice vines and are native to the Caribbean, Mexico and South America. They have very large flowers and glossy foliage. They are also called Cup of Gold.

Solandra grandiflora was once (and likely still is) used by the Huichol of Mexico and other tribes of the region where it is known by the name "kieli" or "kieri" with some archaeological evidence supporting the theory that its use as a hallucinogen predates that of peyote (Lophophora williamsii). A tea from the branches and more so from the roots and fruits is used as an inebriant in native traditions. The alkaloids present include atropine, noratropine, hyoscyamine, and tropine with about 0.15% overall content in the leaves.

In all ten species are recognized:

- Solandra boliviana
- Solandra brachycalyx
- Solandra brevicalyx
- Solandra grandiflora
- Solandra guerrerensis
- Solandra guttata
- Solandra longiflora
- Solandra maxima
- Solandra nizandensis
- Solandra paraensis

== Selected species ==
Image	Scientific name	Distribution
	Solandra grandiflora Sw.	Tropical America
	Solandra longiflora Tussac	Venezuela, Ecuador, Suriname
	Solandra maxima (Sessé & Moc.) P.S.Green – Golden chalice vine, Cup of Gold, Hawaiian lily	Mexico and Central America
