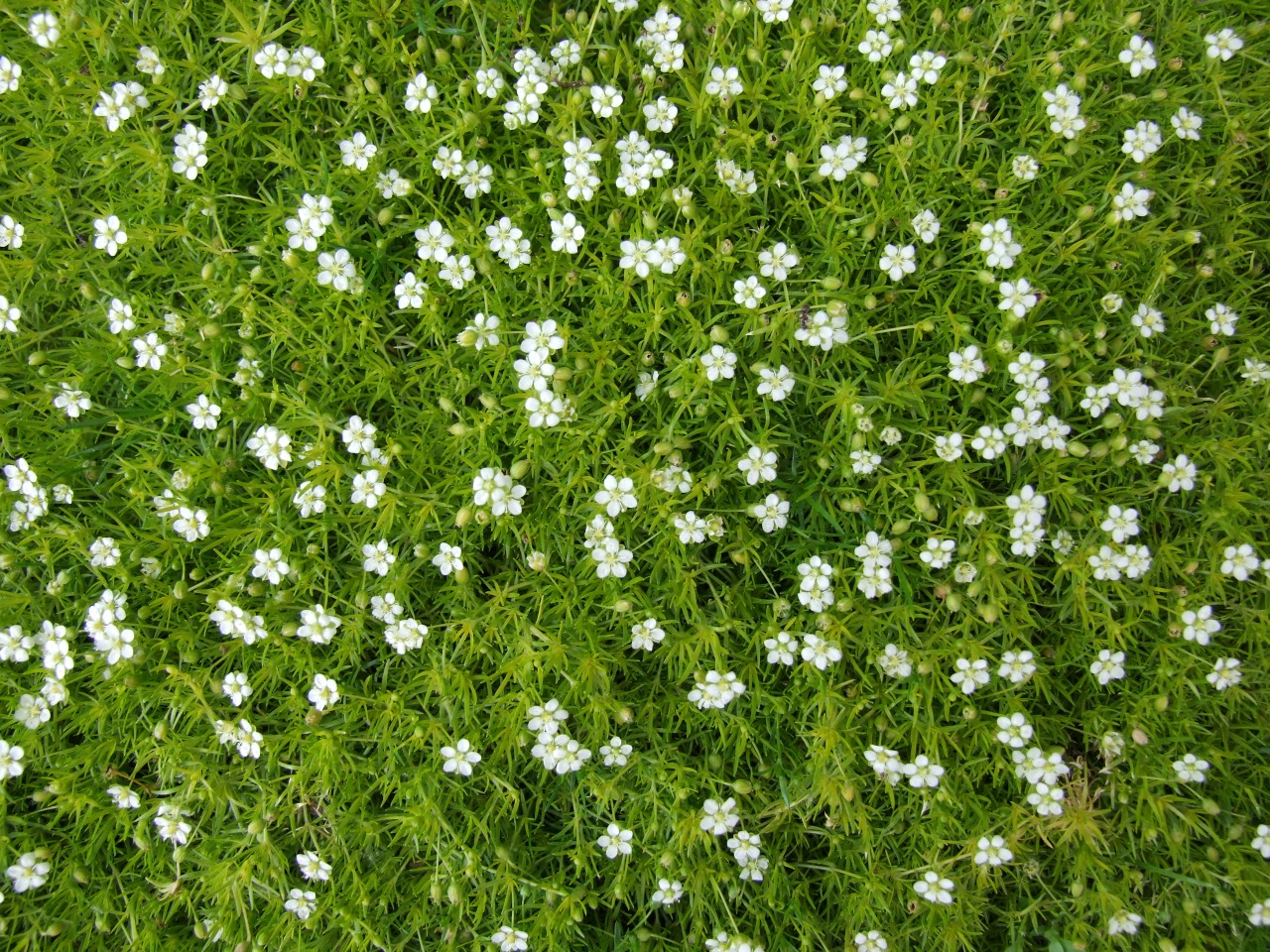
- Plant in flower, Poland

Scientific classification
- Kingdom: Plantae
- Clade: Tracheophytes
- Clade: Angiosperms
- Clade: Eudicots
- Order: Caryophyllales
- Family: Caryophyllaceae
- Genus: Sagina
- Species: S. subulata

Binomial name
- Sagina subulata (Swartz) C.Presl

Synonyms
- Alsine subulata (Sw.) E.H.L. Krause; Phaloe subulata (Sw.) Dumort.; Spergella subulata (Sw.) Rchb.; Spergula subulata Sw.

= Sagina subulata =

Species of flowering plant

Sagina subulata (syn. Sagina pilifera), also known as heath pearlwort or awl-leaf pearlwort, is a species of flowering plant in the pink and carnation family Caryophyllaceae. It is sometimes referred to as Irish or Scottish moss, despite not being closely related to mosses. It is native to Europe, from Iceland south to Spain, and east to southern Sweden and Romania. It occurs on dry sandy or gravelly soils.

== Description ==
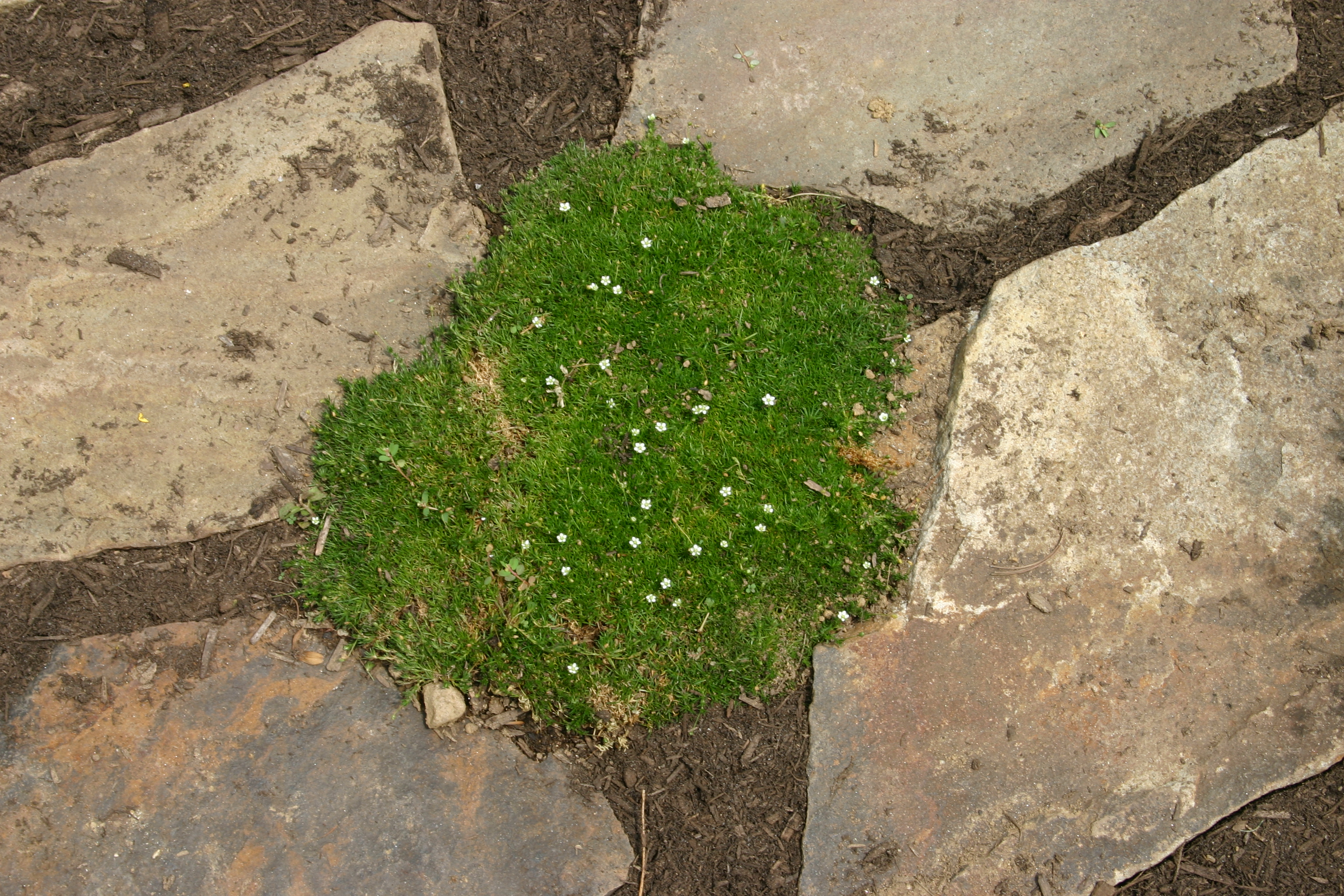
It is commonly cultivated in walkways between paving stones

Heath pearlwort is a low-growing prostrate perennial plant forming a thick, dense mat with stems less than 10 cm long, and slender subulate (awl-shaped) leaves up to 1 cm long. The flowers are 4–5 mm in diameter, with five white petals the same length as the green sepals; they are produced singly on erect stems 2–4 cm long. The seeds are smooth, brown, triangular shaped, 0.4–0.5 mm, produced in a capsule 2.5–3 mm long.

== British Isles ==
Sagina subulata is native to temperate areas of Europe. In the British Isles it is primarily found in Scotland, the Lake District, Wales, the Southwest and South of England, and the coasts of western Ireland. This mat-forming perennial, easy to overlook when not in flower, is found in dry, open, sandy or gravelly places, trackways, heaths, dry banks and grassy slopes near the sea. In the Trotternish Mountains on Skye, it is found on rocky ledges growing with Koenigia islandica. On Mount Brandon in County Kerry, Ireland, it grows at up to 700 m (2,300 ft), and at even higher altitudes on Ben Lawers in Perthshire.

=== Varieties ===
There are two varieties, Sagina subulata var. subulata with glandular-hairy sepals, and Sagina subulata var. glabrata Gillot with hairless sepals; the latter is often a lawn weed, and has been confused with the related Mediterranean species Sagina pilifera. The cultivar 'Aurea' (referred to as Scottish or Scotch Moss in the horticultural trade) is grown as a garden plant.
