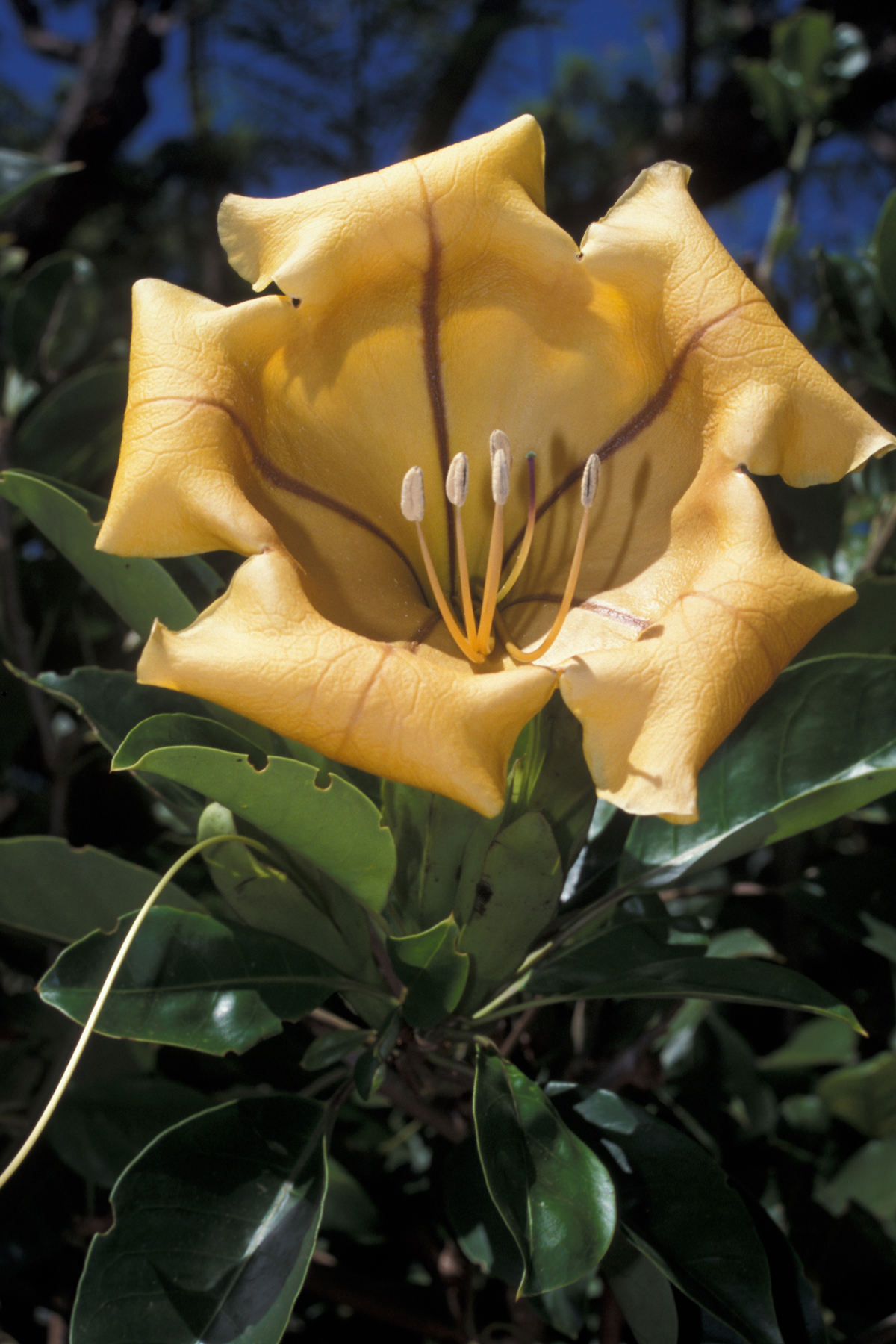

Scientific classification
- Kingdom: Plantae
- Clade: Tracheophytes
- Clade: Angiosperms
- Clade: Eudicots
- Clade: Asterids
- Order: Solanales
- Family: Solanaceae
- Genus: Solandra
- Species: S. maxima

Binomial name
- Solandra maxima (Sessé & Moc. ex Dunal) P.S.Green

Synonyms
- Datura maxima Moc. & Sessé ex Dunal

= Solandra maxima =

Species of vine

Solandra maxima is a flowering plant in the family Solanaceae. It is also known as cup of gold vine, golden chalice vine, Copa de Oro, or Hawaiian lily, is a vigorous vine which is endemic to Mexico and Central America. It has very large yellow flowers and glossy leaves. It is often planted as an ornamental plant.

== Description ==
It is a fast-growing, 12 m (39 ft) tall climbing vine, occasionally reaching as much as 50 m (160 ft) long, which is often pruned back in cultivation to a shrub with overhanging twigs. The leaves are alternately arranged, broad-elliptical to oblong, 5-18 × 2-9 cm in size, leathery, glossy on top and usually short-acuminate. All parts of the plant are poisonous.

=== Flowers ===
The funnel-shaped flowers are usually solitary. The calyx is 5-8 cm long, pentagonal and consists of three to five cusps. The corolla is 15-24 cm long and consists of large, rounded, 8-15 cm wide lobes. The flower is creamy white to light yellow at the start of flowering and changes color to ocher to orange during flowering. Violet or brown bands run deep into the flower tube across the center of the corolla. Five stamens protrude from the flower tube. The flowers open in the evening, exuding a pungent scent. This attracts bats as pollinators. The fruit is round, up to 7 cm large berry on which the sepals are preserved.

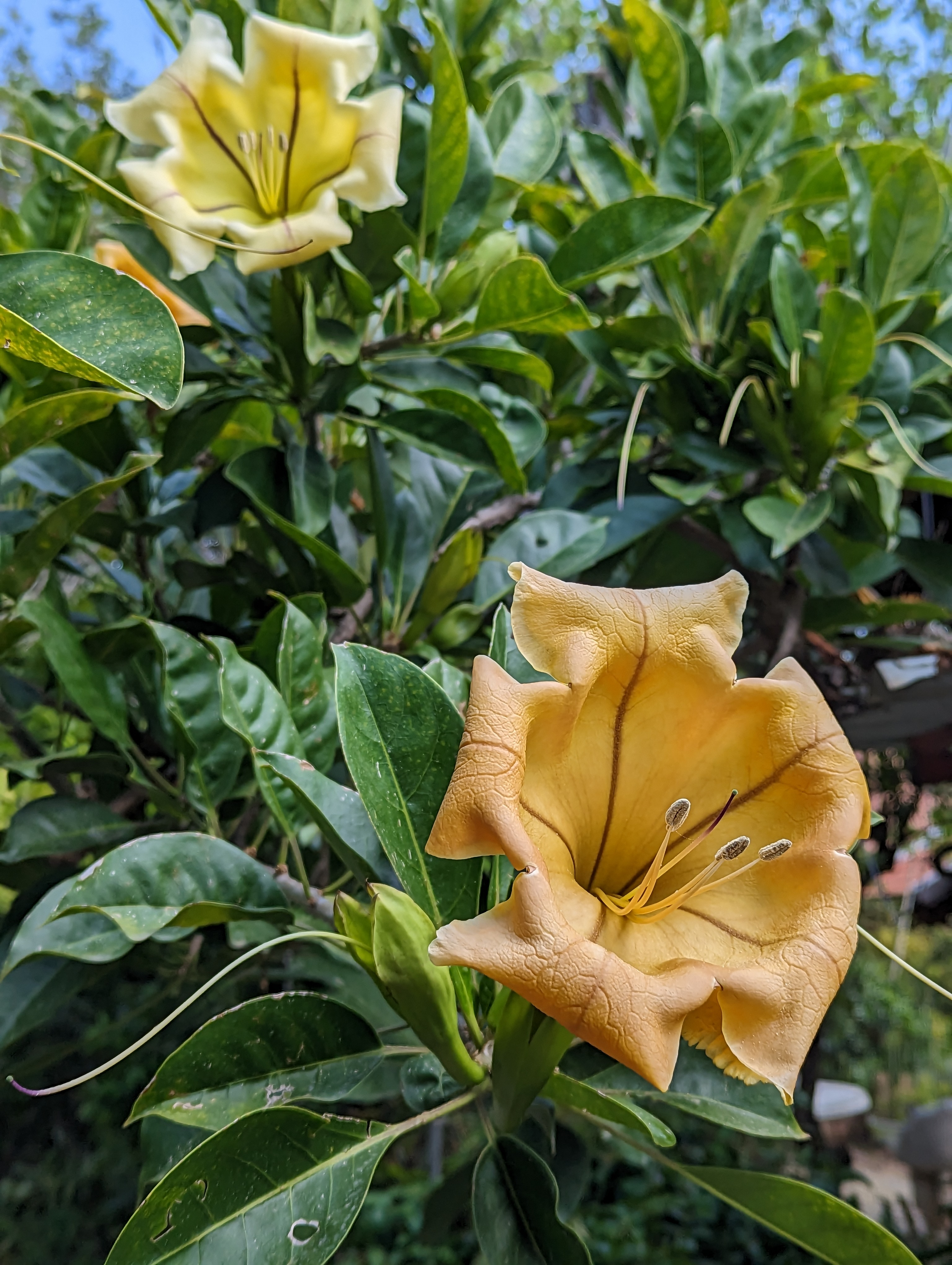
Flower of Solandra maxima

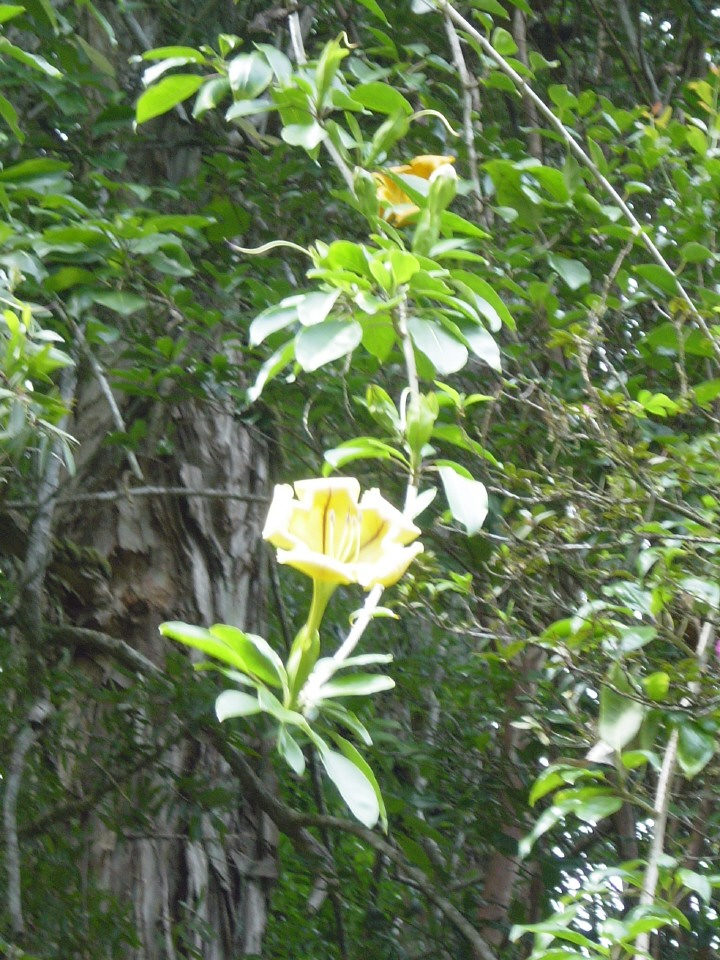

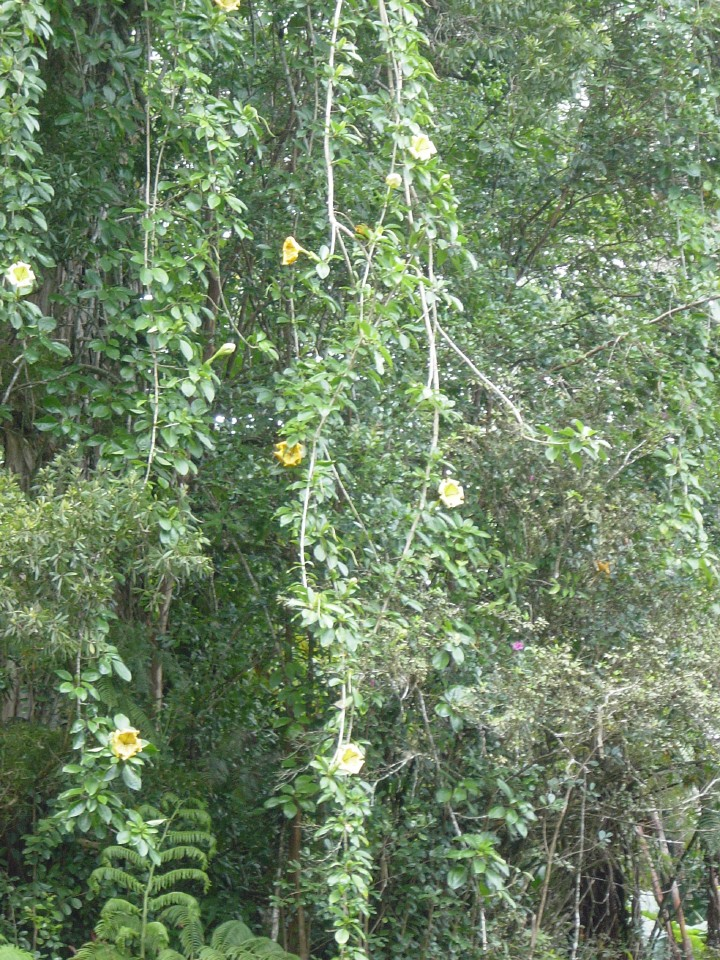

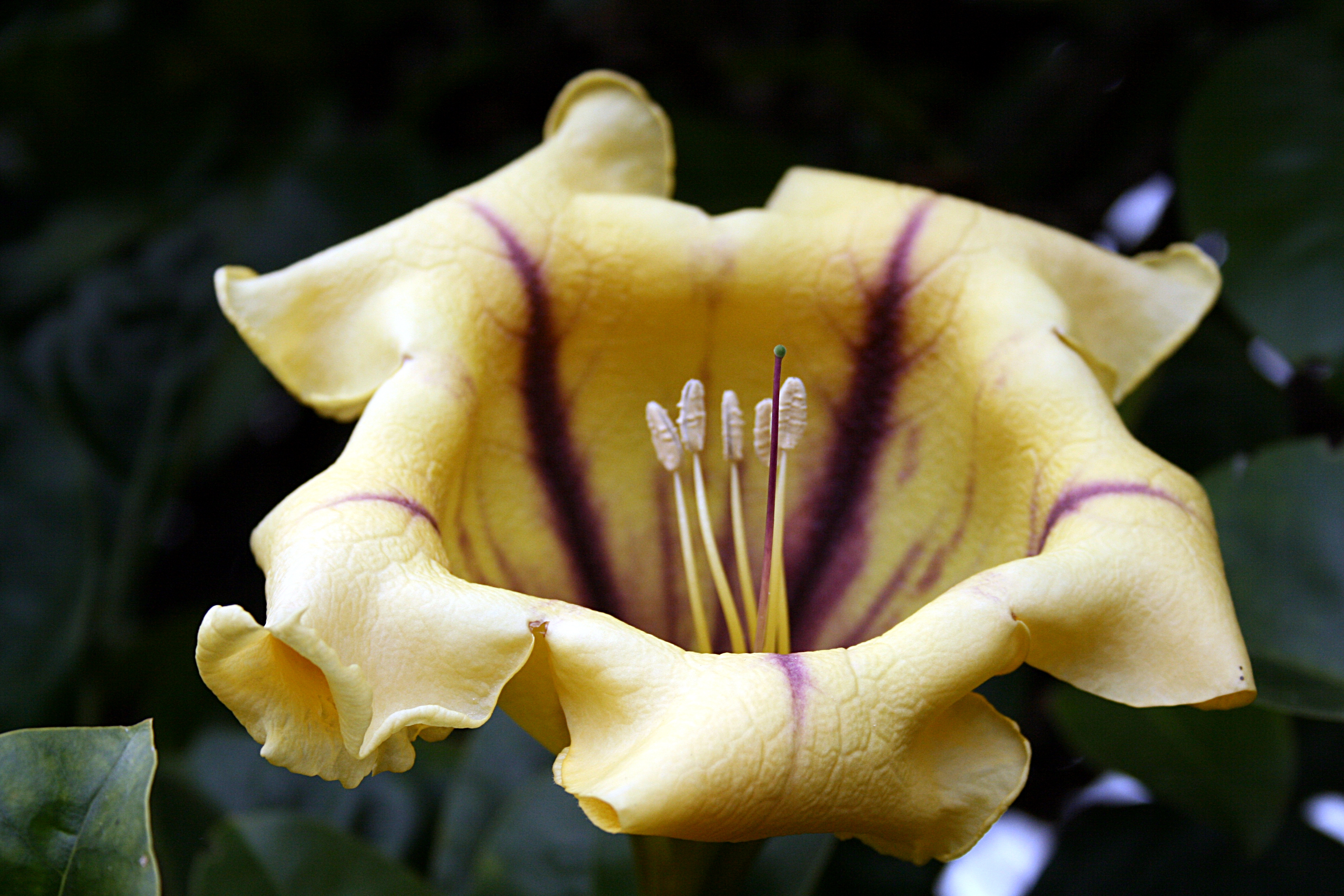
Funchal: Botanical garden

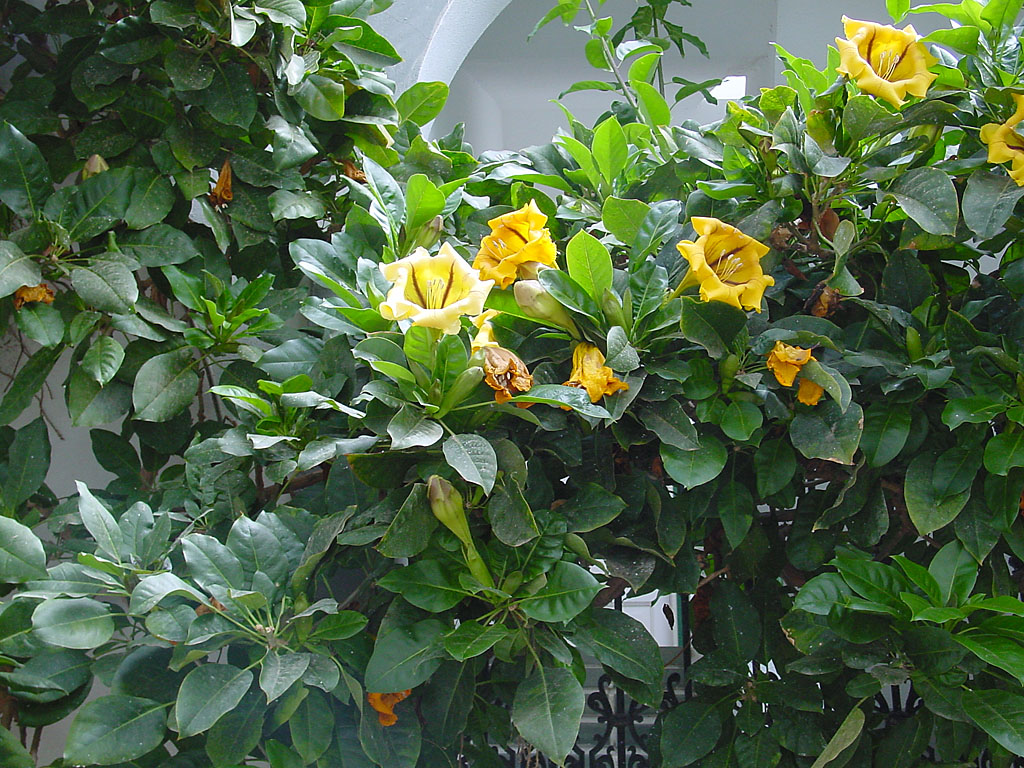
Gran Canaria

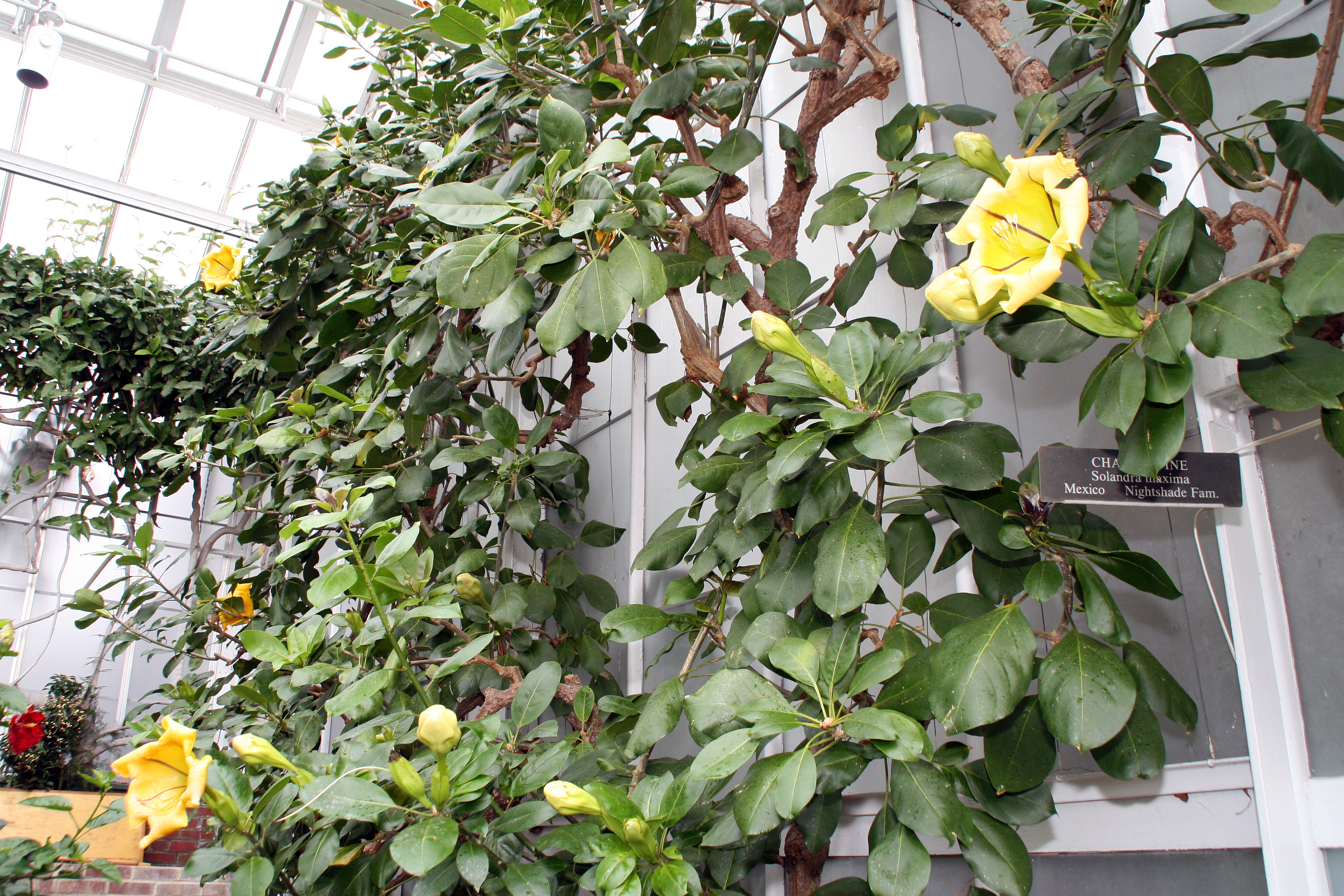
Longwood Gardens, Kennett Square, Pennsylvania

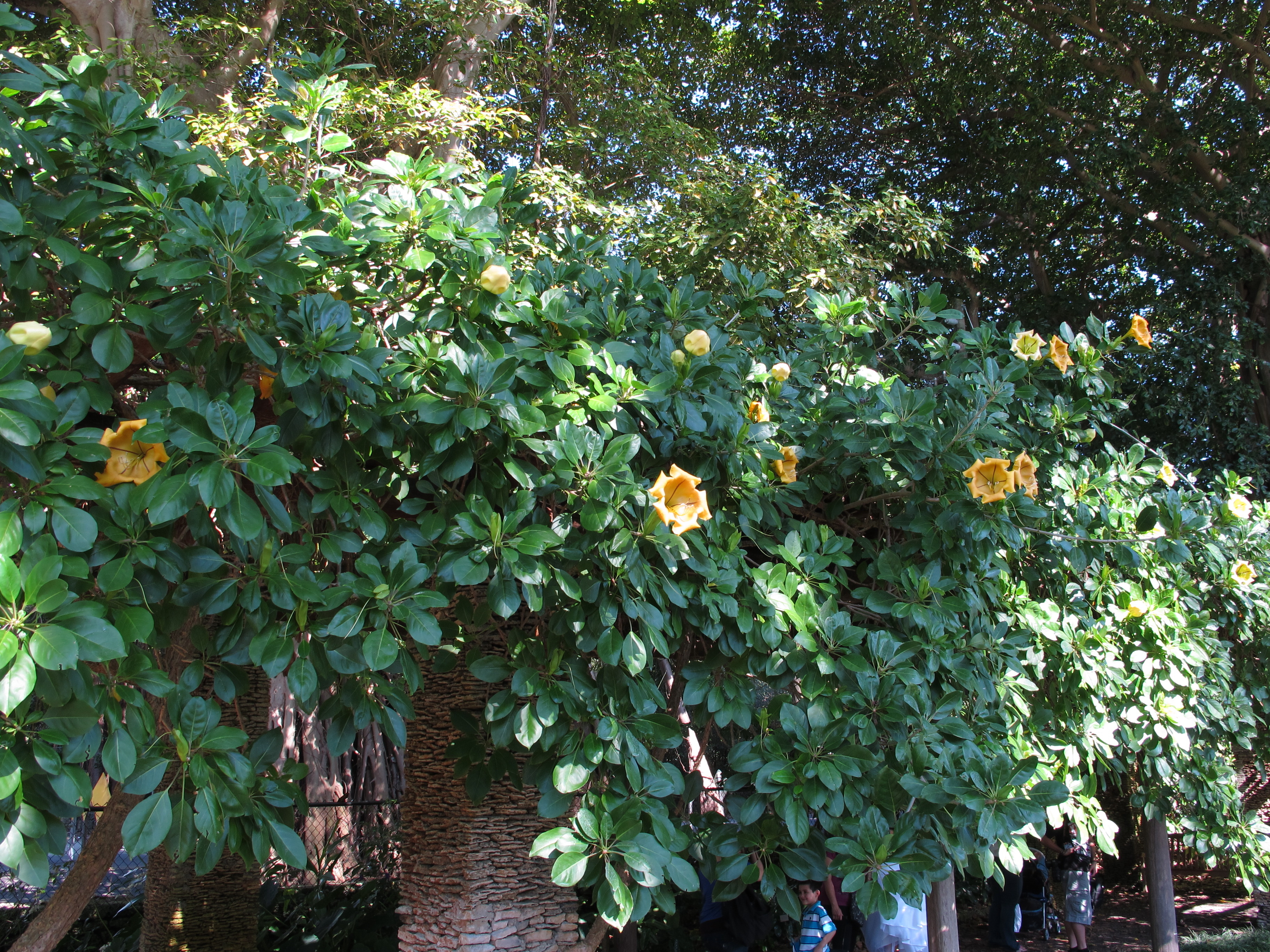
Fairchild Tropical Botanic Garden, Miami, Florida

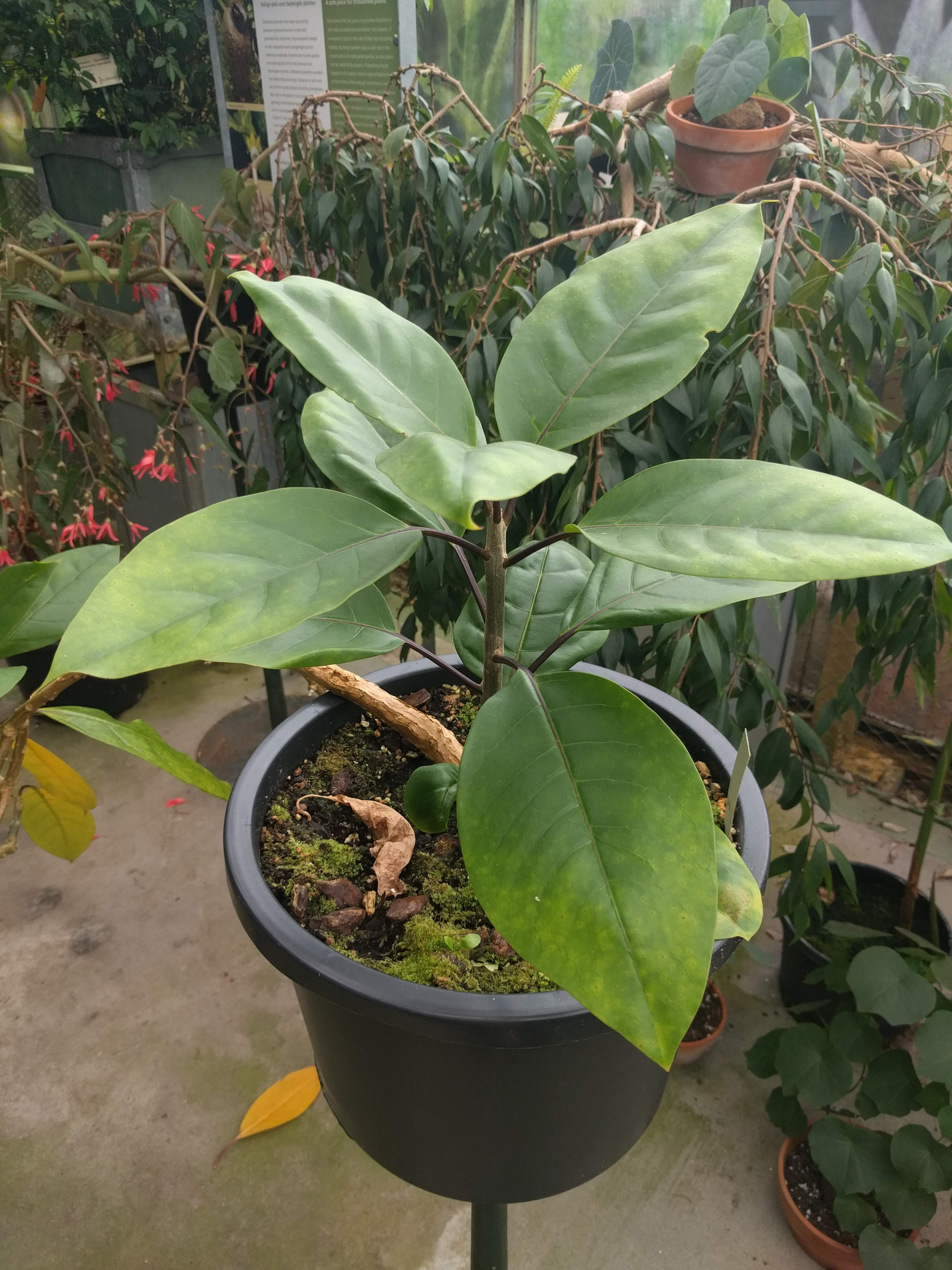
Juvenile
