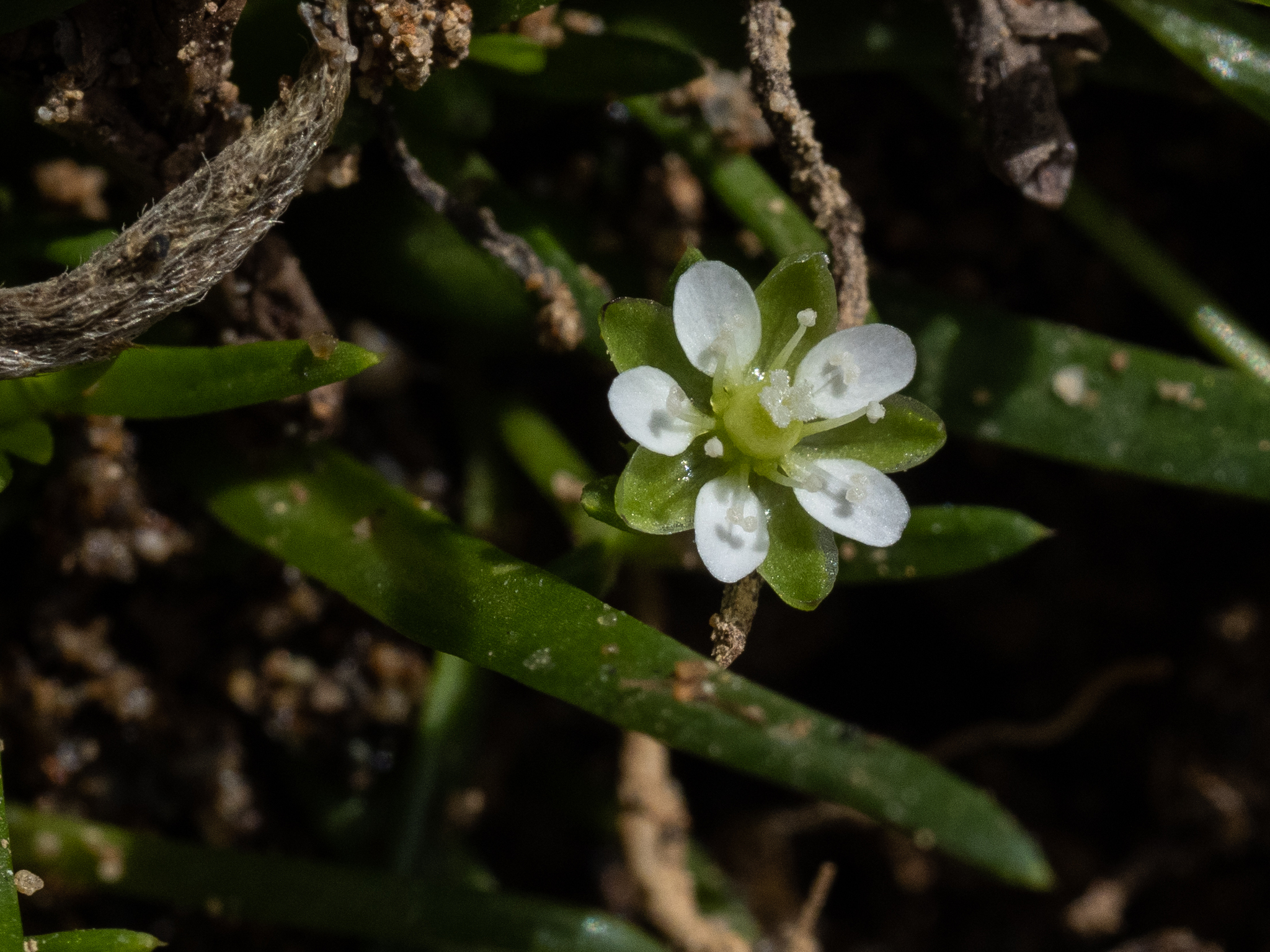

Scientific classification
- Kingdom: Plantae
- Clade: Tracheophytes
- Clade: Angiosperms
- Clade: Eudicots
- Order: Caryophyllales
- Family: Caryophyllaceae
- Genus: Sagina
- Species: S. maxima

Binomial name
- Sagina maxima A.Gray

= Sagina maxima =

Species of flowering plant

Sagina maxima is a species of flowering plant in the family Caryophyllaceae known by the common names stickystem pearlwort and thick-stemmed pearlwort. It is native to the west coast of North America from Alaska to California, where it can be found in many types of sandy and rocky coastal habitat. It is a small, fleshy perennial herb growing in a clump of linear leaves and thick stems. The fleshy, pointed leaves are 1 or 2 centimeters long. The inflorescence is a solitary flower with five sepals and five small white petals. There are two subspecies which differ mainly in the arrangement of hairs on the stem.
