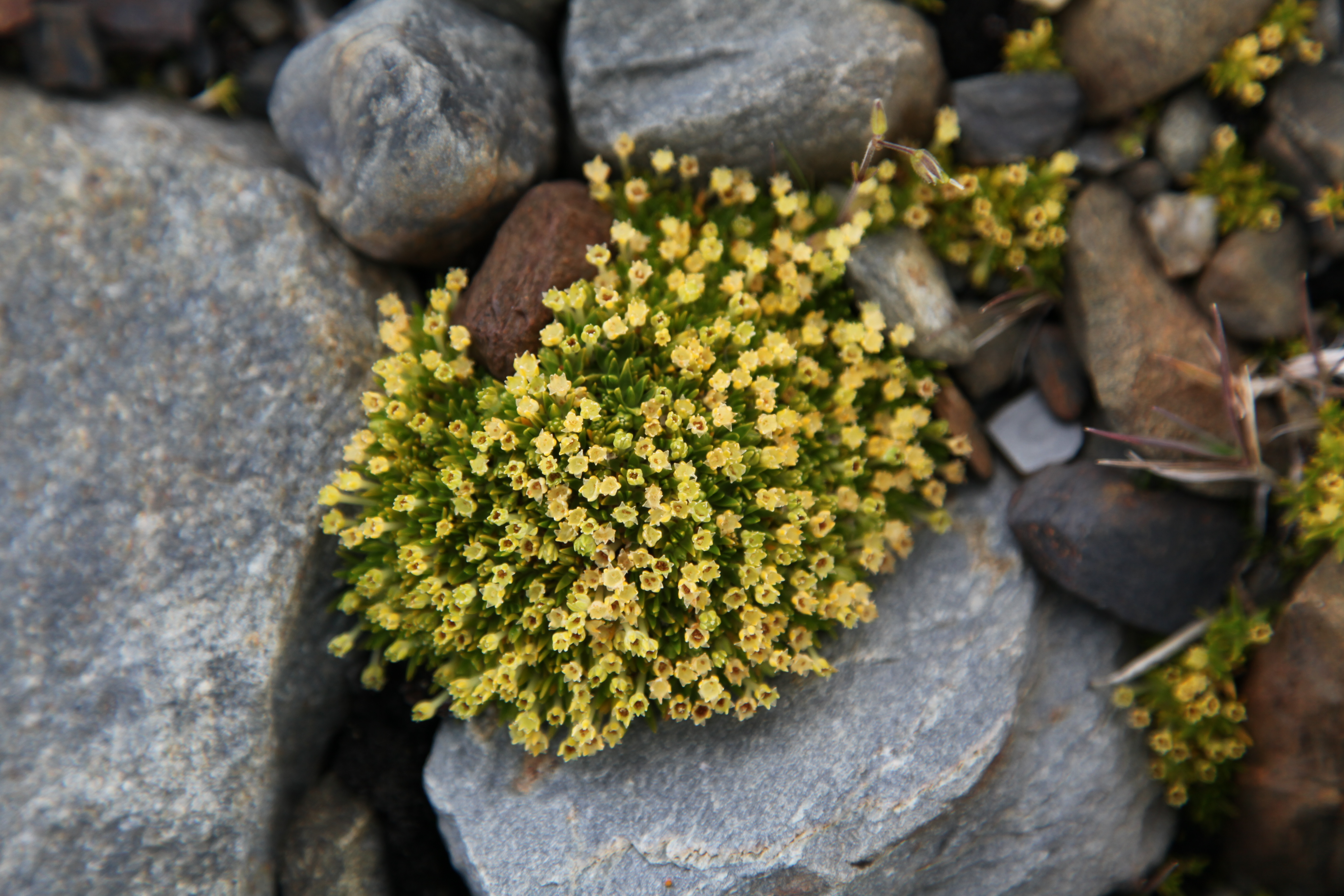
- Antarctic pearlwort at St. Andrews Bay, South Georgia Island

Scientific classification
- Kingdom: Plantae
- Clade: Tracheophytes
- Clade: Angiosperms
- Clade: Eudicots
- Order: Caryophyllales
- Family: Caryophyllaceae
- Genus: Colobanthus
- Species: C. quitensis

Binomial name
- Colobanthus quitensis (Kunth) Bartl.

Synonyms
- Colobanthus alatus Pax; Colobanthus aretioides Gillies ex Hook.; Colobanthus billardieri Fenzl; Colobanthus cherlerioides Hook.f.; Colobanthus crassifolius (d'Urv.) Hook.f.; Colobanthus maclovianus Gand.; Colobanthus meingeni Phil.; Colobanthus saginoides Bartl.; Sagina crassifolia d'Urv.; Sagina graminifolia Wedd.; Sagina magellanica Willd. ex F.Phil.; Sagina quitensis Kunth

= Colobanthus quitensis =

Species of flowering plant

Colobanthus quitensis, also known as the Antarctic pearlwort, is one of two native flowering plants found in the Antarctic region, the other being Antarctic hair grass. It has yellow flowers and grows about 5 centimetres (2 inches) tall, giving it a moss-like appearance. Due to climate change, the species has been spreading rapidly, particularly to areas outside Antarctica.

== Description ==
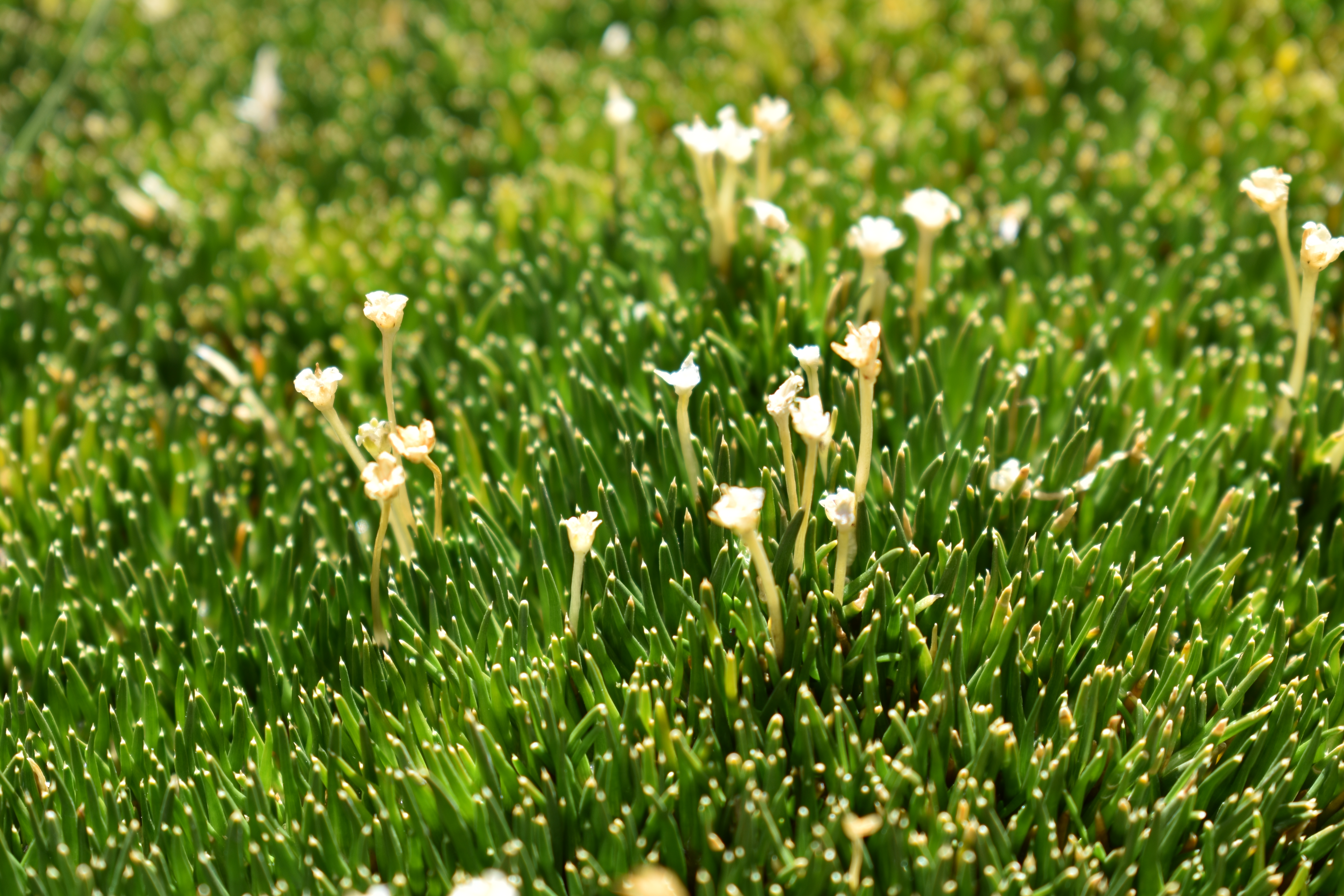
A close-up showing the flowers of Colobanthus quitensis

Colobanthus quitensis has yellow flowers and grows about 5 centimetres (2 inches) tall, with a cushion-like growth habit that gives it a moss-like appearance. It is an angiosperm, meaning that it is a plant that produces flowers, and is capable of asexual reproduction. It relies on wind pollination because of the lack of bees and other pollinating insects in the Antarctic region. Although it is moss-like, Colobanthus quitensis is a tracheophyte, or vascular plant, meaning that it contains vascular tissues called the phloem and xylem.

=== Symbiosis ===
Endophytic fungi have been found living inside of the leaves of Colobanthus quitensis, including saprobic and pathogenic fungal species. Research studies have shown that these fungi are able to produce melanin in their hyphae, which may be the reason they are able to withstand freezing temperatures. The presence of these endophytic fungi have been shown to increase plant performance.

== Distribution ==
Colobanthus quitensis is found on the west coast of the Antarctic Peninsula, on South Georgia, South Shetland, the Falklands, and the Andes, becoming increasingly rare northwards, but reaching Bolivia, Peru, and Ecuador, with a further isolated population in Mexico. It is one of two flowering plants native to Antarctica, the other being Deschampsia antarctica.

=== Climate change ===
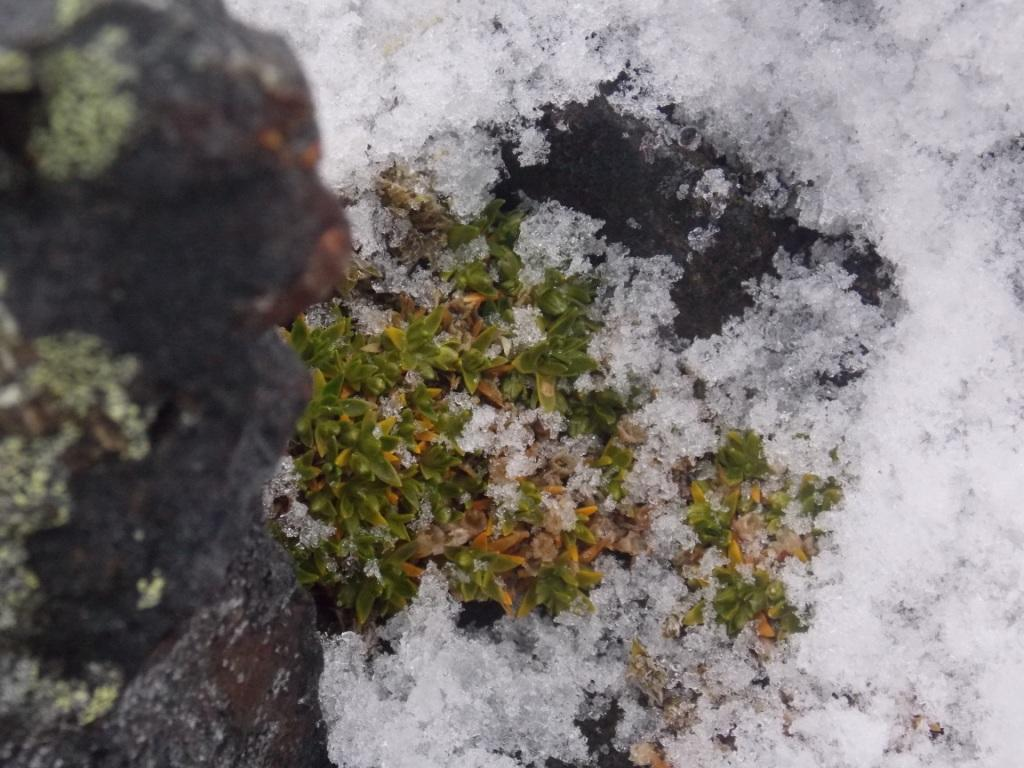
Colobanthus quitensis is able to withstand freezing temperatures.

Within Antarctica, due to climate change, more seeds are germinating, creating a large number of seedlings and plants. Reports indicate a fivefold increase in these plants, which have extended their ranges southward and cover more extensive areas. Research found that the Antarctic pearlwort spread nearly ten times faster during the period 2009 through 2018 compared to between 1960 and 2009. Although future climate change may relieve environmental stress and increase the plant's ability to photosynthesize, warming may reduce its ability to resist freezing temperatures. These plants are most vulnerable during the spring, when the Antarctic ice melts. Furthermore, due to regional warming and human activity, non-native Antarctic species may colonize Antarctica and make it more difficult for native species to survive.
