= List of Ranunculus species =

Ranunculus is a genus of about 1,700 species of plants in the Ranunculaceae. Members of the genus include the buttercups, spearworts and water crowfoots.

== Selected species ==
=== A ===
Species & synonyms	Common names	Native range	Illustration
Ranunculus abaensis W. T. Wang = R. indivisus var. abaensis
Ranunculus abchasicus Freyn ex Sommier & Levier			
Ranunculus abnormis Cutanda & Willk.		Iberian Peninsula	
Ranunculus abortivus L.: var. abortivus; var. australis Brandegee; ssp. acrolasius (Fernald) Kapoor & Löve = R. abortivus; var. acrolasius Fernald = R. abortivus; var. eucyclus Fernald = R. abortivus; var. indivisus Fernald = R. abortivus; var. harveyi A. Gray = R. harveyi	Little-leaf buttercup; Small-flower crowfoot; Kidney-leaf buttercup; Small-flowered buttercup	North America	
Ranunculus acaulis DC.	Dune buttercup; Sand buttercup; Shore buttercup	New Zealand	
Ranunculus acer auct. = Ranunculus acris
Ranunculus acetosellifolius Boiss.		Southwestern Europe	
Ranunculus aconitifolius L.	Aconite-leaf buttercup	Europe	
Ranunculus acraeus Heenan & P.J.Lockh.		New Zealand	
Ranunculus acriformis A.Gray	Sharpleaf buttercup	North America	
var. acriformis	Sharpleaf buttercup	USA (Colorado, Wyoming)	
var. aestivalis L.D.Benson	Autumn buttercup; Autumn sharp buttercup; Autumn-fir buttercup; Fall buttercup	USA (Utah)	
var. montanensis (Rydb.) L.D.Benson	Mountain sharp buttercup	USA (Idaho, Montana, Utah, Washington, Wyoming)	
Ranunculus acris L.: var. acris; var. frigidus Regel	Common buttercup; Meadow buttercup; Tall buttercup	Temperate Eurasia	
var. aestivalis (L. D. Benson) S. L. Welsh = R. acriformis var. aestivalis; ssp. borealis (Trautv.) Nyman = R. borealis; ssp. glabriusculus (Rupr.) Löve = R. glabriusculus; ssp. japonicus (Thunb.) Hultén = R. japonicus; var. japonicus (Thunb.) Maxim. = R. japonicus; var. latisectus Beck = R. acris; var. monticola (Kitag.) Tamura = R. paishanensis
Ranunculus acutidentatus Rupr. = Ranunculus acutilobus
Ranunculus acutilobus Ledeb.			
Ranunculus adoneus A.Gray: var. adoneus; var. alpinus (S.Watson) L.D.Benson; ssp. huetii P.H.Davis	Alpine buttercup	North America (Rocky Mountains)	
Ranunculus adoxifolius Hand.-Mazz.			
Ranunculus aduncus Gren.			
Ranunculus aestivalis (L.D.Benson) Van Buren & K.T.Harper = R. acriformis var. aestivalis
Ranunculus ageri Bertol.			
Ranunculus albertii Regel & Schmalh.			
Ranunculus alismellus (A. Gray) Greene = R. alismifolius var. alismellus
Ranunculus alismifolius Geyer ex Benth.: var. alismellus A. Gray; var. alismifolius; var. davisii L. D. Benson; var. hartwegii (Greene) Jeps.; var. lemmonii (A. Gray) L. D. Benson; var. montanus S. Watson	Plantainleaf buttercup	Western North America	
Ranunculus allegheniensis Britton	Allegheny Mountain buttercup	Eastern North America	
Ranunculus allenii B.L.Rob.	Allen's buttercup	Northern Canada	
Ranunculus alpestris L.	Alpine buttercup	Europe	
Ranunculus ambigens S.Watson	Waterplantain spearwort	Eastern North America	
Ranunculus amphitrichus Colenso	Small river buttercup	Southeastern Australia	
Ranunculus amplexicaulis L.	Clasping-leaf buttercup	Iberian Peninsula	
Ranunculus amplus N.G.Walsh & B.G.Briggs	Lacey River buttercup	Victoria, Australia	
Ranunculus andersonii A. Gray: var. andersonii; var. juniperinus (Jones) S.L.Welsh; var. tenellus S.Watson	Anderson's buttercup	Western United States	
Ranunculus anemoneus F.Muell.	Anemone buttercup	Alpine regions of southeastern Australia	
Ranunculus anemonifolius auct. = Ranunculus elegans
Ranunculus aquatilis L.: var. aquatilis; var. arcticus Durand; var. diffusus With.	Common water-crowfoot; White water-crowfoot	Europe; Africa; North America	
Ranunculus arizonicus Lemmon ex A. Gray: var. arizonicus; var. subsagittatus A. Gray; var. subaffinis A. Gray = R. inamoenus var. subaffinis	Arizona buttercup	Southwestern United States; Mexico	
Ranunculus arvensis L.: var. arvensis; var. tuberculatus DC.; var. echinatissimus (Blatt.) Qureshi & Chaudhri = R. arvensis	Corn buttercup; Devil-on-all-sides; Scratch bur	Europe	
Ranunculus asiaticus L.	Persian buttercup; Persian crowfoot; Asian buttercup	Eastern Mediterranean Basin	
Ranunculus auricomus L.	Goldilocks buttercup; Greenland buttercup	Northern Eurasia; Greenland	
Ranunculus austro-oreganus L. D. Benson	Southern Oregon buttercup	USA (southern Oregon)	

=== B ===
Species & synonyms	Common names	Native range	Illustration
Ranunculus barceloi Grau (1984)			
Ranunculus baudotii			
Ranunculus bilobus Bertol.			
Ranunculus biternatus Sm.	Antarctic buttercup	Patagonia; Subantarctic islands	
Ranunculus bonariensis Poir.	Carter's buttercup	Chile, Argentina; Central California	
Ranunculus borealis Trautv.			
Ranunculus bulbosus L.	St Anthony's turnip; Bulbous buttercup	Europe	
Ranunculus bullatus	Autumn buttercup	Mediterranean region	
Ranunculus bupleuroides		Iberian Peninsula	

=== C ===
Species & synonyms	Common names	Native range	Illustration
Ranunculus californicus Benth.	California buttercup	California	
Ranunculus canus Benth.	Sacramento Valley buttercup	California	
Ranunculus cardiophyllus Hook.	Heartleaf buttercup	Western North America	
Ranunculus carinthiacus	Carinthian buttercup	Europe	
Ranunculus cassubicifolius		Europe	
Ranunculus cassubicus	Kashubian buttercup	Eastern Europe	
Ranunculus caucasicus			
Ranunculus circinatus	Fan-leaved water-crowfoot	Europe	
Ranunculus clivicola B.G.Briggs		Alpine regions of southeastern Australia	
Ranunculus coloradensis (L. Benson) L. Benson			
Ranunculus cordiger Viviani			
Ranunculus cortusifolius Willd.	Azores buttercup		
Ranunculus crassipes	Subantarctic buttercup	Subantarctic region	

=== D ===
Species & synonyms	Common names	Native range	Illustration
Ranunculus degenii Kümmerle & Jáv.			
Ranunculus demissus DC.			
Ranunculus densiciliatus W. T. Wang			
Ranunculus dichotomus Moc. & Sessé ex DC.			
Ranunculus dielsianus Ulbr.			
Ranunculus diffusus DC.			
Ranunculus dingjieensis L. Liou			
Ranunculus dissectifolius F.Muell.		Alpine regions of southeastern Australia	
Ranunculus dissectus M.Bieb.			
Ranunculus distans Royle			
Ranunculus dongrergensis Hand.-Mazz.			
Ranunculus donianus Pritz.			

=== E ===
Species & synonyms	Common names	Native range	Illustration
Ranunculus elegans C. Koch			
Ranunculus eschscholtzii Schltdl.: var. eschscholtzii; var. eximius (Greene) L.D.Benson; var. helleri (Rydb.) L.D. Benson; var. oxynotus (A. Gray) Jeps.; var. suksdorfii (A. Gray) L.D. Benson; var. trisectus (Eastw. ex B.L. Rob.) L.D.; var. adoneus (A.Gray) C.L.Hitchcock = Ranunculus adoneus; var. alpinus (S.Watson) C.L.Hitchcock = Ranunculus adoneus	Eschscholtz's buttercup	Western North America	
Ranunculus extensus (Hook. f.) Schilbe. ex Engl.			

=== F ===
Species & synonyms	Common names	Native range	Illustration
Ranunculus falcatus auct. non L.: Ranunculus testiculatus Crantz; Ceratocephala falcata auct. non (L.) Pers.; Ceratocephala orthoceras DC.; Ceratocephala testiculata (Crantz) Roth	Curveseed butterwort	Eurasia	
Ranunculus fallax		Europe	
Ranunculus fascicularis	Early buttercup	Eastern North America	
Ranunculus flabellaris	Yellow water buttercup	North America	
Ranunculus flammula	Lesser spearwort	Boreal Kingdom	
Ranunculus fluitans	River water-crowfoot	Europe	

=== G ===
Species & synonyms	Common names	Native range	Illustration
Ranunculus glaberrimus	Sagebrush buttercup	Interior western North America	
Ranunculus glacialis	Glacier crowfoot; Glacier buttercup	Arctic-alpine Europe; Siberia; Alaska	
Ranunculus gmelinii	Gmelin's buttercup	North America	
Ranunculus gormanii	Gorman's buttercup	Oregon; Northern California	
Ranunculus gramineus	Grassy-leaved buttercup	Southern Europe	

=== H ===
Species & synonyms	Common names	Native range	Illustration
Ranunculus harveyi (A. Gray) Britton: var. australis (Brand) L.D. Benson	Harvey's buttercup	south-central U.S.	
Ranunculus hebecarpus	Delicate buttercup	Western North America	
Ranunculus hederaceus	Ivy-leaved crowfoot	Europe	
Ranunculus hispidus	Bristly buttercup; Hispid buttercup; Swamp buttercup	Eastern North America	
Ranunculus hybridus	Hybrid buttercup	European Alps	
Ranunculus hydrocharoides	Frogbit buttercup; Frog's bit buttercup	Western North America	
Ranunculus hyperboreus Rottb.	High northern buttercup	Northern North America	

=== I ===
Species & synonyms	Common names	Native range	Illustration
Ranunculus illyricus L. = R. alexeenkoi Grossh. = R. meridionalis Grossh.		Eastern Europe	
Ranunculus indivisus (Maxim.) Hand.-Mazz.: var. abaensis (W. T. Wang) W. T. Wang; var. indivisus			
Ranunculus insignis Hook.f.	Korikori	New Zealand	
Ranunculus inundatus R.Br. ex DC.	river buttercup	Southeastern Australia	

=== J ===
Species & synonyms	Common names	Native range	Illustration
Ranunculus japonicus Thunb.	mao gen	China	
Ranunculus jovis	Utah buttercup	Mountain west United States	

=== K ===
Species & synonyms	Common names	Native range	Illustration
Ranunculus kadzusensis	Maehwamarum; Korean water crowfoot	Asia	
Ranunculus kuepferi			

=== L ===
Species & synonyms	Common names	Native range	Illustration
Ranunculus lanuginosus L.: Ranunculus umbrosus Ten.	Woolly buttercup; Downy buttercup	Europe	
Ranunculus lappaceus	Australian buttercup	Eastern Australia	
Ranunculus lapponicus	Lapland buttercup	Arctic	
Ranunculus lingua	Greater spearwort	Eurasia	
Ranunculus lobbii	Lobb's buttercup; Lobb's aquatic buttercup	Western North America	
Ranunculus longirostris Godr. = R. aquatilis var. diffusus With.	Longbeak buttercup; White water-crowfoot	North America	
Ranunculus luminarius		Italy	
Ranunculus lyallii	Mount Cook Lily; Mount Cook buttercup; Mountain buttercup	New Zealand	

=== M ===
Species & synonyms	Common names	Native range	Illustration
Ranunculus macounii	Macoun's buttercup	North America	
Ranunculus macranthus	Large buttercup	North America	
Ranunculus macrophyllus	Large-leaf buttercup	Europe	
Ranunculus micranthus Nutt.	Rock buttercup; Small-flowered crowfoot	United States	
Ranunculus millefolius Banks & Sol.	Jerusalem buttercup; Nurit	Israel, Lebanon, Syria	
Ranunculus montanus	mountain buttercup	Europe	
Ranunculus monophyllus		eastern Europe to subarctic Asia and northern China	
Ranunculus moseleyi	Moseley's buttercup		
Ranunculus muricatus	Spinyfruit buttercup	Europe	

=== N ===
Species & synonyms	Common names	Native range	Illustration
Ranunculus nivalis L.	Snow buttercup		
Ranunculus nipponicus			

=== O ===
Species & synonyms	Common names	Native range	Illustration
Ranunculus obtusiusculus Raf.			
Ranunculus occidentalis	Western buttercup	Western North America	
Ranunculus ophioglossifolius	Badgeworth Buttercup	Europe	
Ranunculus orthorhynchus	Straightbeak buttercup	Western North America	
Ranunculus oz Christenh. & Byng		Australia	

=== P ===
Species & synonyms	Common names	Native range	Illustration
Ranunculus pachyrrhizus Hook.f.		New Zealand	
Ranunculus papulentus	Large River buttercup	Southeastern Australia	
Ranunculus parviflorus	Smallflower buttercup	Europe	
Ranunculus pauperculus Ovcz. = R. eschscholtzii	Eschscholtz's buttercup	Western North America	
Ranunculus pedatifidus	Birdfoot buttercup; Northern buttercup; Surefoot buttercup	Asia; North America	
Ranunculus peduncularis		South America	
Ranunculus peltatus	Pond water crowfoot	Europe; Southwestern Asia; Northern Africa	
Ranunculus penicillatus		Europe; Morocco	
Ranunculus penicillatus ssp. pseudofluitans		Southern UK (chalk streams)	
Ranunculus pensylvanicus	Pennsylvania buttercup	North America	
Ranunculus petiolaris	Latin American buttercup	SE. Arizona and W. Texas to Honduras, Colombia to NW. Venezuela and Peru	
Ranunculus pimpinellifolius Hook.	Bog buttercup	Eastern Australia	
Ranunculus pinguis		New Zealand (Auckland and Campbell Islands)	
Ranunculus platanifolius	Large white buttercup		
Ranunculus polyanthemos	Multiflowered buttercup	Europe; Central Asia; Siberia	
Ranunculus populago	Popular buttercup; Mountain Buttercup	Pacific Northwest United States	
Ranunculus pusillus	Low spearwort	Eastern United States	
Ranunculus pygmaeus	Pygmy buttercup	Circumpolar Arctic	
Ranunculus pyrenaeus	Pyrenean buttercup	Andorra; France; Spain	

=== R ===
Species & synonyms	Common names	Native range	Illustration
Ranunculus radicans		Siberia to northern China	
Ranunculus recurvatus	Hooked crowfoot; Hooked buttercup	Eastern North America	
Ranunculus repens	Creeping buttercup	Eurasia; Northwestern Africa	
Ranunculus reflexus	Maruru	Aotearoa New Zealand	
Ranunculus reptans: R. flammula var. filiformis	Greater creeping spearwort	North America	
Ranunculus rhomboideus	Prairie Buttercup	North America	

=== S ===
Species & synonyms	Common names	Native range	Illustration
Ranunculus sardous	Hairy buttercup; Sardinian buttercup	Europe	
Ranunculus sceleratus	Cursed buttercup; Celery-leaved buttercup	Eurasia; North America	
Ranunculus seguieri	Seguier's buttercup	Southeastern Europe	
Ranunculus septentrionalis	Swamp buttercup	Eastern North America	
Ranunculus sericophyllus Hook.f.	Silky alpine buttercup; Feathery-leaved buttercup	New Zealand	
Ranunculus siamensis		Thailand, India, Nepal, Myanmar and Indochina	
Ranunculus sieboldii		Asia	
Ranunculus silerifolius		Eastern Asia	
Ranunculus subrigidus W.B.Drew = R. aquatilis var. diffusus	White water-crowfoot		
Ranunculus sulphureus Sol. ex C.J. Phipps: var. altaica (Laxm.) Trautv.; var. sulphureus; var. albertii (Regel & Schmalh.) Maxim. = R. alberti; var. intercedens Hultén = R. sulphureus	Sulphur buttercup	Alaska; Canada; Greenland	

=== T ===
Species & synonyms	Common names	Native range	Illustration
Ranunculus thora L.	Tora buttercup	Europe	
Ranunculus trichophyllus Chaix ex Vill. = R. aquatilis var. diffusus With.
Ranunculus trilobus Desf.	Threelobe buttercup	Mediterranean	
Ranunculus triternatus A. Gray			
Ranunculus trivedii Aswal & Mehrotra		Himalayas	
Ranunculus turneri Greene			

=== U ===
Species & synonyms	Common names	Native range	Illustration
Ranunculus uncinatus D.Don	Woodland buttercup; Little buttercup	Western North America	

=== V ===
Species & synonyms	Common names	Native range	Illustration
Ranunculus velutinus Ten.			
Ranunculus venetus Huter ex Landolt			
Ranunculus verticillatus	Lobe-leaf buttercup	New Zealand	
Ranunculus victoriensis B.G.Briggs	Victorian Buttercup	Victoria, Australia	
Ranunculus viridis H. D. Wilson et Garn.-Jones	Mt Allen buttercup	Stewart Island, New Zealand	
Ranunculus vjatkensis Tzvelev		European Russia	

=== W ===
Species & synonyms	Common names	Native range	Illustration
Ranunculus wangianus Q. E. Yang			
Ranunculus weddellii Lourteig			
Ranunculus wettsteinii Dörfl.			
Ranunculus weyleri Marès			

=== X ===
Species & synonyms	Common names	Native range	Illustration
Ranunculus xinningensis W. T. Wang			

=== Y ===
Species & synonyms	Common names	Native range	Illustration
Ranunculus yanshanensis W.T.Wang			
Ranunculus yaoanus W.T.Wang			
Ranunculus yechengensis W. T. Wang			
Ranunculus yinshanicus (Y. Z. Zhao) Y. Z. Zhao			
Ranunculus yunnanensis Franch.			

=== Z ===
Species & synonyms	Common names	Native range	Illustration
Ranunculus zhungdianensis W. T. Wang			
