= Ranunculus austro-oreganus =

Southern Oregon buttercup

Scientific classification
- Kingdom: Plantae
- Clade: Tracheophytes
- Clade: Angiosperms
- Clade: Eudicots
- Order: Ranunculales
- Family: Ranunculaceae
- Genus: Ranunculus
- Species: R. austro-oreganus

Binomial name
- Ranunculus austro-oreganus L.D. Benson

Species of buttercup

Ranunculus austro-oreganus, the Southern Oregon buttercup, is a plant species endemic to the region around Medford, Oregon. It grows on grassy areas at elevations less than 500 m (1650 feet).

Ranunculus austro-oreganus is an erect to ascending herb not rooting at the nodes. Leaves are 3-parted, up to 5 cm (2 inches) long and about as wide. Flower petals are each up to 12 mm (0.5 inches) long, yellow with prominent red veins visible on the back but not on the front. Achenes are hemispheric with a persistent straight or curved beak. The species is closely related to R. occidentalis.
