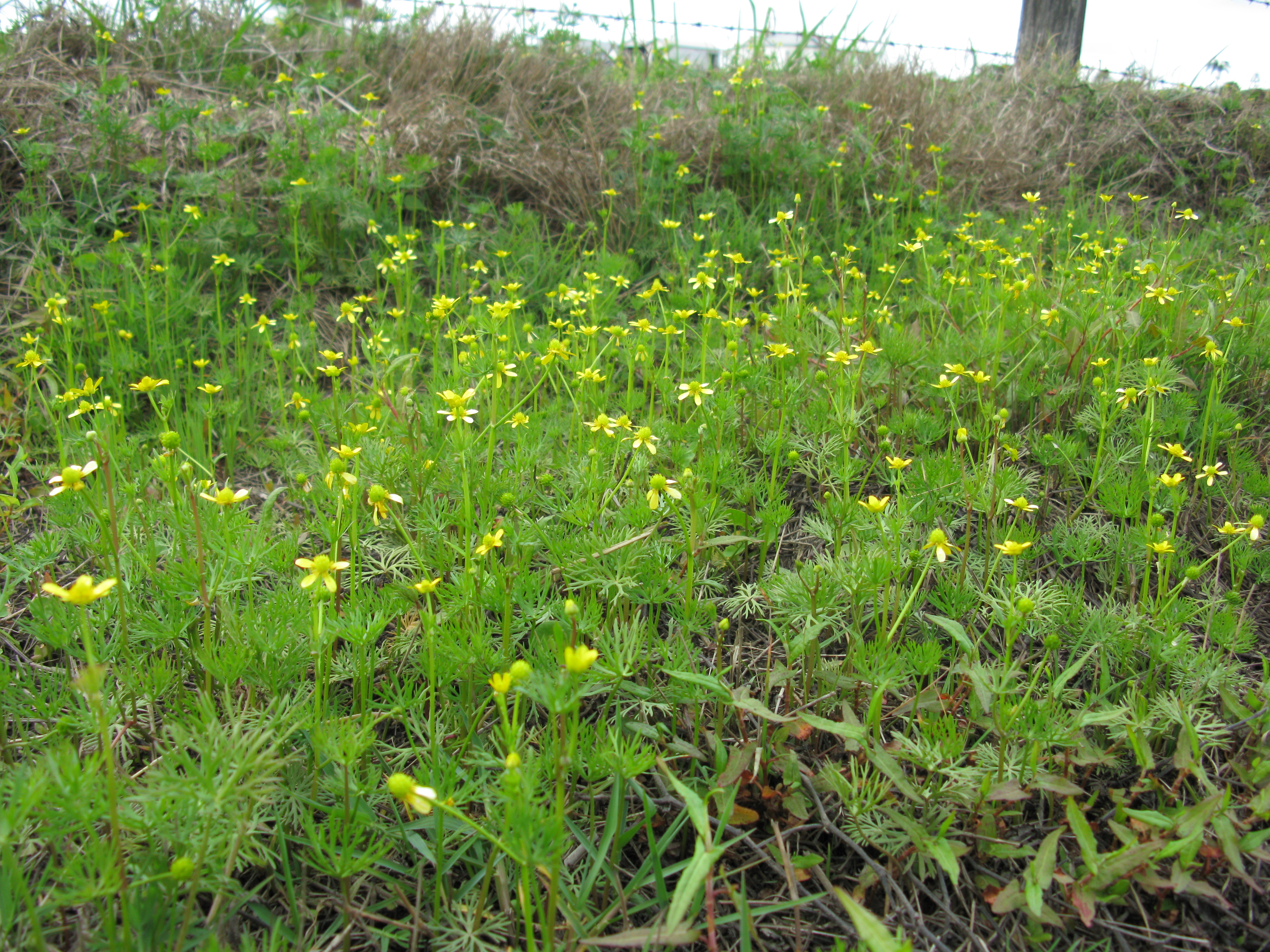

Scientific classification
- Kingdom: Plantae
- Clade: Tracheophytes
- Clade: Angiosperms
- Clade: Eudicots
- Order: Ranunculales
- Family: Ranunculaceae
- Genus: Ranunculus
- Species: R. inundatus

Binomial name
- Ranunculus inundatus R.Br. ex DC

= Ranunculus inundatus =

Species of buttercup

Ranunculus inundatus, commonly known as the river buttercup, is a species of buttercup found in eastern Australia. The plant has found some recent relevance within the freshwater aquascaping and home aquarium/vivarium hobbies, particularly amongst enthusiasts of nano aquariums.
