= Ranunculus clivicola =

Scientific classification
- Kingdom: Plantae
- Clade: Tracheophytes
- Clade: Angiosperms
- Clade: Eudicots
- Order: Ranunculales
- Family: Ranunculaceae
- Genus: Ranunculus
- Species: R. clivicola

Binomial name
- Ranunculus clivicola B.G.Briggs

Species of buttercup

Ranunculus clivicola is a rare species of buttercup found in alpine Australia.
