= Ranunculus petiolaris =

Scientific classification
- Kingdom: Plantae
- Clade: Tracheophytes
- Clade: Angiosperms
- Clade: Eudicots
- Order: Ranunculales
- Family: Ranunculaceae
- Genus: Ranunculus
- Species: R. petiolaris

Binomial name
- Ranunculus petiolaris Humb., Bonpl. & Kunth ex DC

Synonyms
- List: Ranunculus petiolaris var. typicus L.D.Benson; Ranunculus aschenbornianus S.Schauer; Ranunculus galeottii Turcz.; Ranunculus geoides Humb., Bonpl. & Kunth ex DC.; Ranunculus geoides var. standleyi L.D.Benson; Ranunculus geoides var. typicus L.D.Benson; Ranunculus hookeri Schltdl.; Ranunculus hookeri var. minor Donn.Sm. & Loes.; Ranunculus llaveanus Schltdl.; Ranunculus longepedunculatus Van Houtte; Ranunculus magellanicus Comm. ex DC.; Ranunculus mexicanus K.C.Davis; Ranunculus petiolaris var. hookeri (Schltdl.) L.D.Benson; Ranunculus petiolaris var. standleyi (L.D.Benson) T.Duncan; Ranunculus vaginalis Planch. & Linden

Species of plant

Flower from above

Nectar pocket at base of petal

Flower from below, with 2 wilted, hairy, downturned sepals of the original 5

Compound leaf at plant base

Ranunculus petiolaris, the Latin American buttercup, is a herbaceous plant native to the Americas, mainly in the tropics. It belongs to the family Ranunculaceae.

== Description ==
Buttercup species constitute a large genus and the considerably polymorphic Latin American buttercup is similar to several other buttercup species. Still, the following key features help distinguish the species:

- Vegetative parts are covered with stiff hairs. Stems are much branched and may stand erect or recline and if they touch the ground may develop roots where leaves attach.
- Leaves with petioles up to 27 mm (1 1/8 in) may have blades that are divided into 3 leaflets, or be undivided, with leaflets themselves shallowly to deeply lobed. The whole compound blade may be up to 12 cm × 14 cm (4 1/2 in × 5 1/2 in) in size or much smaller.
- Flower pedicels can be up to 15 cm (6 in) long, though usually they are much shorter. There are 5 hairy sepals which fall off as the flower ages, and 5-13 yellow petals which can be up to 20 mm (13/16 in) long and 7 mm (9/32 in) wide. Petal tips vary from rounded to flat or notched; at petal bases nectar is produced in a pocket formed by a special scale. Stamens numbering 25-40 cluster around 10-30 pistils.
- One-seeded, achene-type fruits can be almost circular in shape to wider above the middle, and up to 4 mm (5/32 in) long. Their surfaces can be smooth or bear large bumps which may develop into rigid hairs lying against the surface.

== Distribution ==
In the USA, Ranunculus petiolaris occurs in the southernmost states of Arizona and Texas. It appears throughout Mexico, south to Guatemala and Honduras, plus in South America a disjunct population occurs from Venezuela to Peru.

== Habitat ==
In highland central Mexico, Ranunculus petiolaris occurs in mountain forests with oak, pine, and fir trees, as well as cloud forests and vegetation derived from those forest types, at elevations of 1,300–3,500 m (4,300–11,500 ft) above sea level. Images on this page show an individual in central Mexico growing beside a road next to a forest of oaks and pines, at about 2,550 m (8,370 ft) in elevation. In Colombia it is found in forest clearings, along roads, meadows and wet fields.

== Of value for beekeeping ==
In Mexico's Veracruz state, Latin American buttercup is recognized as bearing melliferous flowers providing pollen for pollinators, while flowering from May to October.

== In traditional medicine ==
In Mexico, a tea made with the leaves and roots of Latin American buttercup is drunk to treat diarrhea and intestinal worms. The root is ground and the resulting paste is applied to the gums to alleviate toothache. Such paste, mixed with kerosene, salt and soda is applied to the skin to fight infections. Also it is employed to remove white spots on the skin, such as those caused by mange and scabies, usually occurring on the hands and arms.

In fact, laboratory tests with rats suggests that extracts with methanol and dichloromethane exhibit anti-inflammatory affects. On the other hand, the plant has been reported to produce an irritant action similar to that of cantharidin, but more delayed.

== Taxonomy ==
Ranunculus petiolaris is one of many taxa first scientifically collected by Alexander von Humboldt and Aimé Bonpland during their American Expedition of 1799–1804, and supplied to Carl Sigismund Kunth for taxonomic treatment. Kunth provisionally suggested the name Ranunculus petiolaris and formally described and named the new species in 1821, but by that time Augustin Pyramus de Candolle had gained access to the same collections from the Humboldt and Bonpland expediction, and already in 1817 had published the description and name. De Candolle credited Humboldt, Bonpland and Kunth, and stated that it was unpublished when he saw it, with the shorthand annotation "R. petiolaris. Humb. Bonpl. et Kunth ! nov. gen. et sp. Amer. ined."

=== Historical varieties ===
Published literature and current websites frequently mention varieties of the species Ranunculus petiolaris. However, in 2026 the consensus appeared to be that those varieties were just local expressions of the polymorphic species, and several varieties now are listed as synonyms.

=== Etymology ===
The genus name Ranunculus is constructed of the Latin rana, meaning "frog," and unculus, meaning "little," so "little frog." This is an allusion to the wet habitats in which some of the species are to be found.

The species name petiolaris is formed of the Late Latin petiolus, literally meaning "little foot", but given its modern meaning of "petiole" by Linnaeus. This is in combination with the Latin -aris meaning "of the kind of, belonging to." Apparently this refers to the flowers' pedicels, which in Ranunculus petiolaris can be particularly long for buttercup species.
