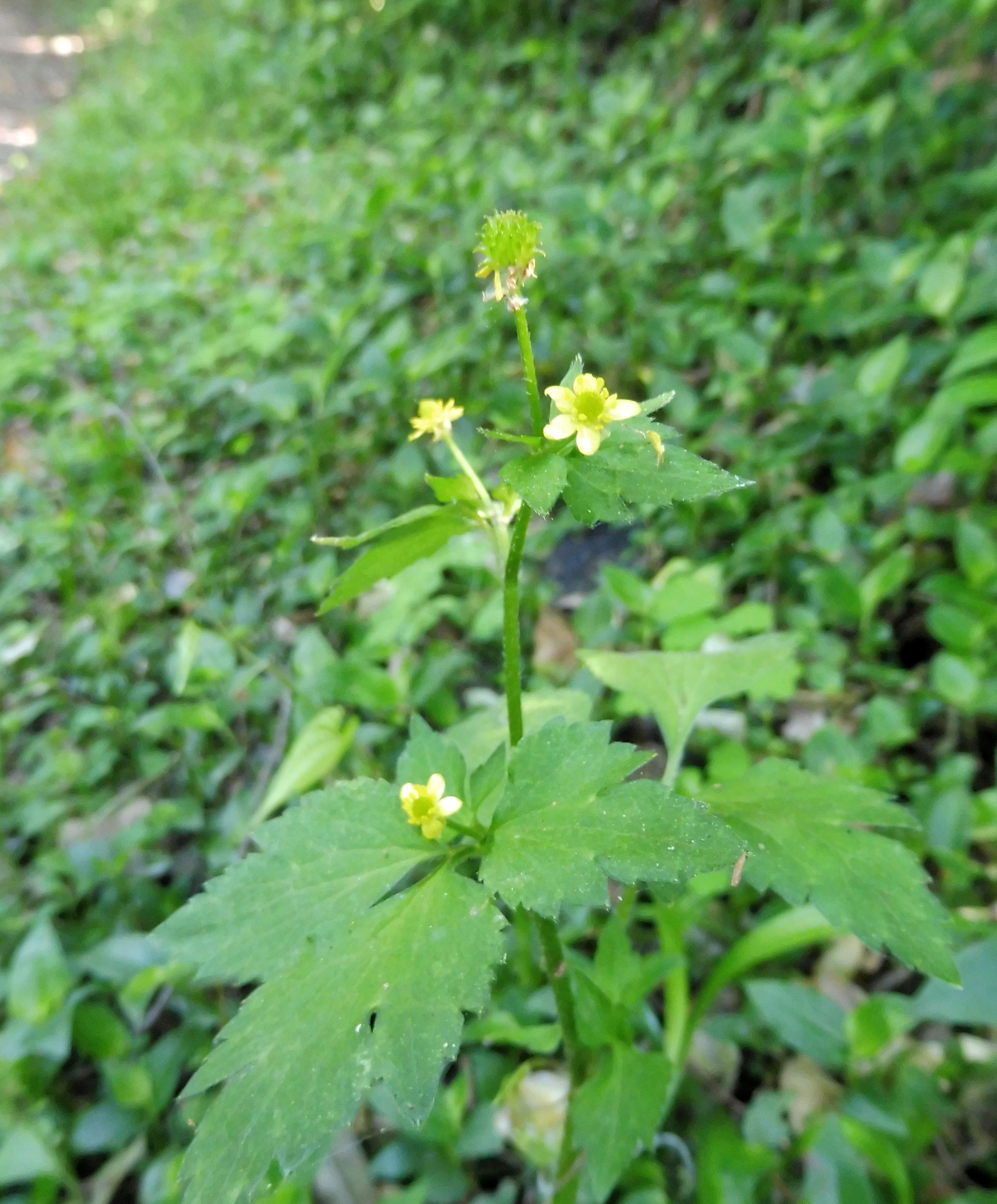

Scientific classification
- Kingdom: Plantae
- Clade: Tracheophytes
- Clade: Angiosperms
- Clade: Eudicots
- Order: Ranunculales
- Family: Ranunculaceae
- Genus: Ranunculus
- Species: R. silerifolius

Binomial name
- Ranunculus silerifolius H.Lév.

Synonyms
- Ranunculus quelpaertensis var. glaber

= Ranunculus silerifolius =

Species of flowering plant

Ranunculus silerifolius is a species of flowering plant in the buttercup family (Ranunculaceae). It is native to eastern Asia, where it is found in Bhutan, China, northeast India, Indonesia, Japan, and Korea. Its natural habitat is in moist places, by steams, in forests, or on grassy slopes. It is considered a common species in Japan, and can be found in disturbed areas.

It is a perennial, growing 30 to 80 cm tall. It produces yellow flowers from April to July.
