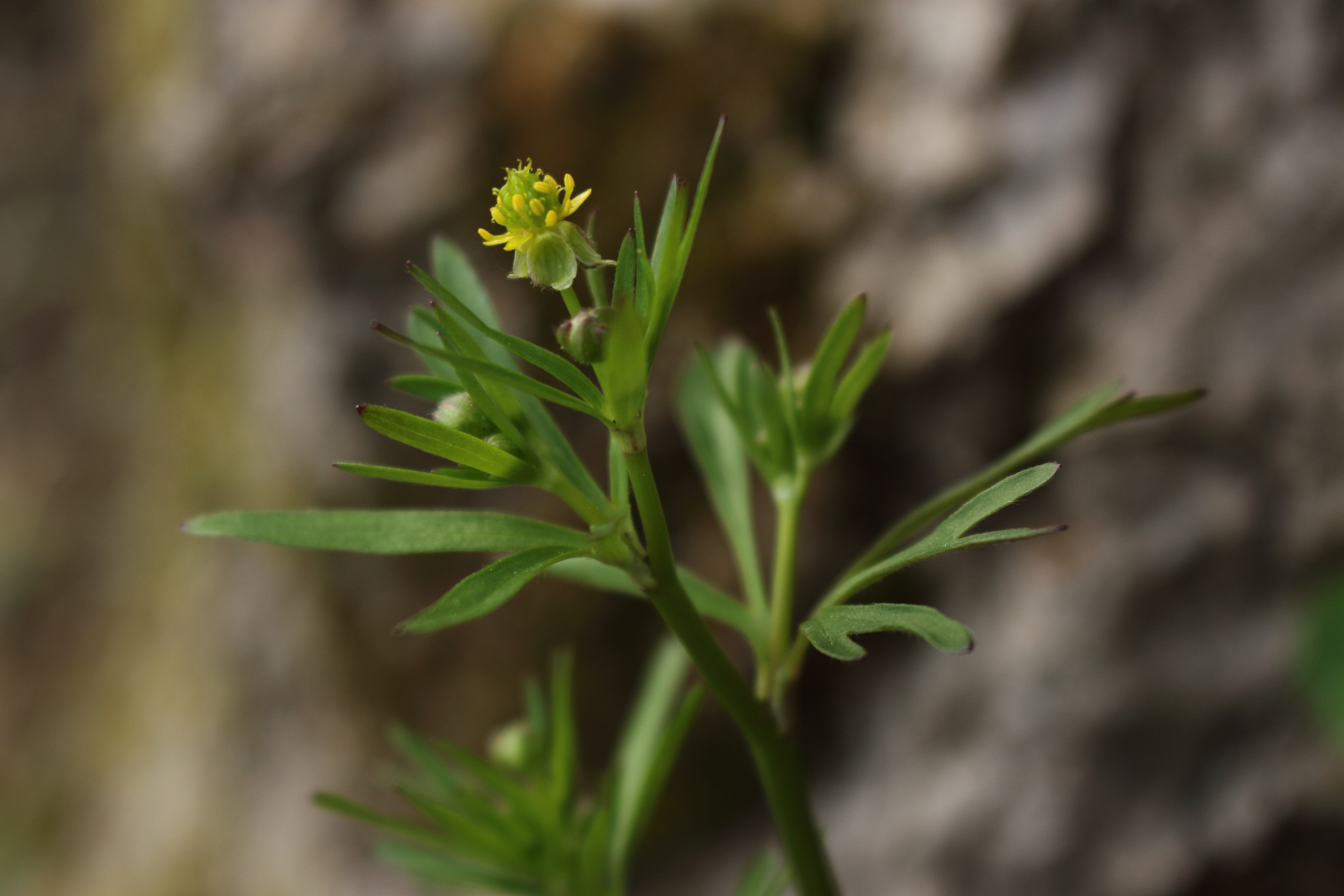

Conservation status
- Apparently Secure (NatureServe)

Scientific classification
- Kingdom: Plantae
- Clade: Tracheophytes
- Clade: Angiosperms
- Clade: Eudicots
- Order: Ranunculales
- Family: Ranunculaceae
- Genus: Ranunculus
- Species: R. allegheniensis

Binomial name
- Ranunculus allegheniensis Britt.

= Ranunculus allegheniensis =

Species of flowering plant

Ranunculus allegheniensis is a species of flowering plant in the buttercup family, Ranunculaceae. Its common names include Allegheny Mountain buttercup and Allegheny crowfoot.

It is found in the northeastern United States, in and around the northern segments of the Appalachian mountains., particularly in areas of high pH bedrock.

== Description ==
Ranunculus allegheniensis produces stems 10 to 50 cm (3.9 to 19.7 in) tall, topped with several flowers. The leaves are variable in shape, and both stems and leaves are hairless. The outer basal leaves are kidney-shaped with variously scalloped margins, the inner basal leaves are either three-lobed or trifoliate. The stem leaves are alternate and deeply lobed or divided. Those at the bottom have long petioles (stems), those at the top are shorter-stemmed to stemless, with narrow blades or lobes.

Each stem can bear up to 40 flowers. The flower has five petals up to 1 to 2 mm (1/32 to 3/32 in) long, the petals shorter than the sepals, which are up to 2 to 3 mm (3/32 to 1/8 in) long. The center of the flower has many smooth, green carpels clustered on an ovoid receptacle. Each carpel has a slender, curved "beak" appendage at the top; the length of these appendages, (0.6 to 1.0 mm (1/32 to 3/64 in)), is one of the points of differentiation from the otherwise similar Ranunculus abortivus, which has carpels with much shorter beaks. The cluster of carpels is surrounded by a ring of yellowish stamens.
