= Ranunculus pachyrrhizus =

- Ranunculus pachyrrhizus in flower in the Old Man Range, South Island

Scientific classification
- Kingdom: Plantae
- Clade: Tracheophytes
- Clade: Angiosperms
- Clade: Eudicots
- Order: Ranunculales
- Family: Ranunculaceae
- Genus: Ranunculus
- Species: R. pachyrrhizus

Binomial name
- Ranunculus pachyrrhizus Hook.f.

Species of flowering plant

Ranunculus pachyrrhizus is a species of flowering plant in the buttercup family, Ranunculaceae, endemic to the southern South Island in New Zealand. The species was originally described by Joseph Dalton Hooker.
