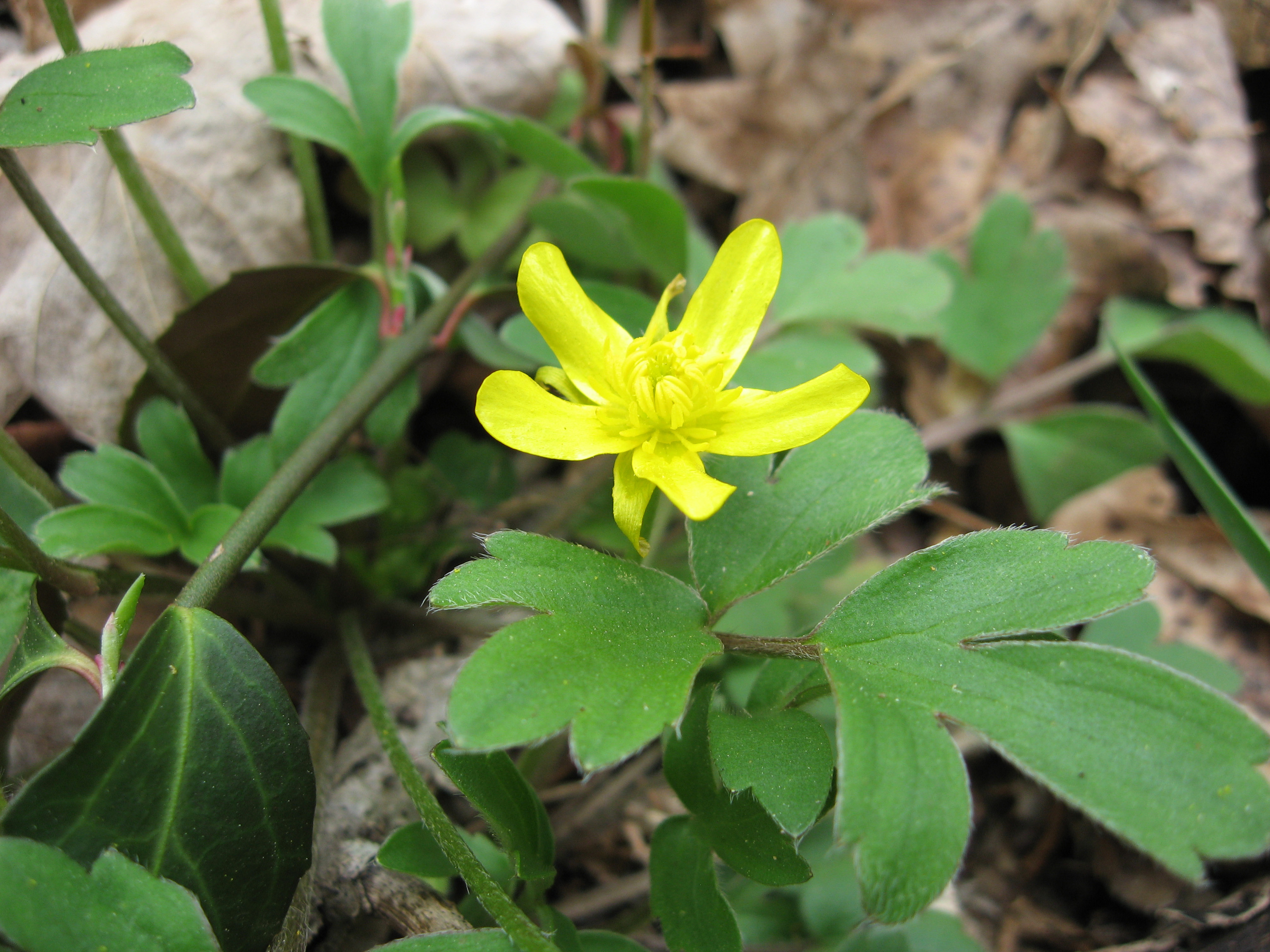

Scientific classification
- Kingdom: Plantae
- Clade: Tracheophytes
- Clade: Angiosperms
- Clade: Eudicots
- Order: Ranunculales
- Family: Ranunculaceae
- Genus: Ranunculus
- Species: R. fascicularis

Binomial name
- Ranunculus fascicularis Muhl. ex Bigelow

= Ranunculus fascicularis =

Species of plant

Ranunculus fascicularis, commonly called early buttercup, is a species of flowering plant in the buttercup family (Ranunculaceae). It is native to the eastern North America, where it is found in Canada and the United States. It is generally widespread in eastern North America, although its populations become sporadic in areas east of the Appalachian Mountains and south of New England. Its natural habitat is in dry areas with sparse vegetation, such as rocky or sandy bluffs, prairies, and savannas.

Ranunculus fascicularis is a perennial. It produces yellow flowers in early spring. It can be difficult to distinguish from the similar looking Ranunculus hispidus, which occupies much of the same range. In general, Ranunculus fascicularis has an earlier bloom time than Ranunculus hispidus, and is more typically found in drier habitats. Ranunculus fascicularis can be distinguished morphologically by its pinnately dissected leaves that are longer than wide in outline (as opposed to palmately dissected leaves that are roughly as wide as long), and by the presence of tuberous roots.
