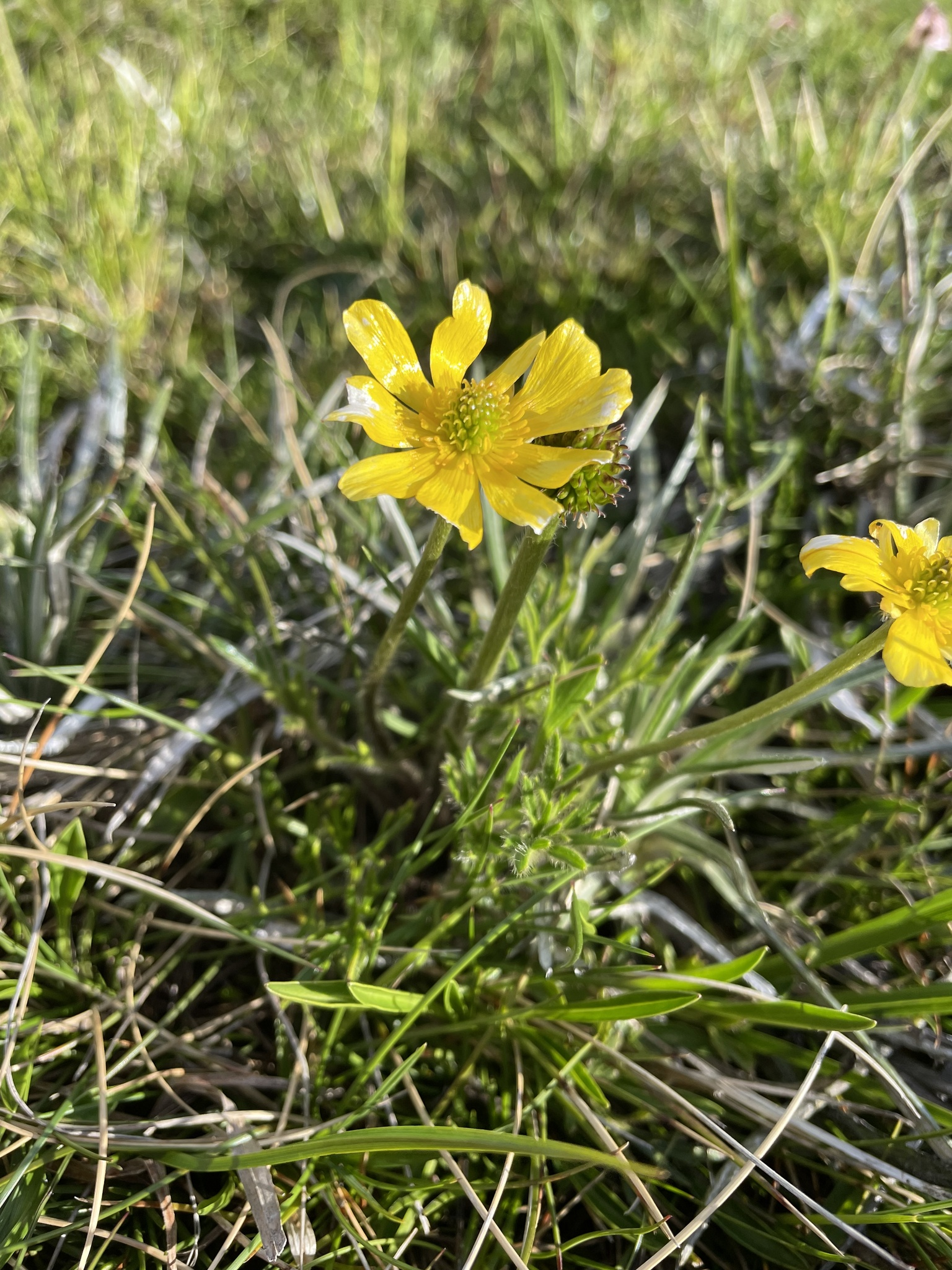

Scientific classification
- Kingdom: Plantae
- Clade: Tracheophytes
- Clade: Angiosperms
- Clade: Eudicots
- Order: Ranunculales
- Family: Ranunculaceae
- Genus: Ranunculus
- Species: R. dissectifolius

Binomial name
- Ranunculus dissectifolius F.Muell.

= Ranunculus dissectifolius =

Species of plant

Ranunculus dissectifolius is a rare species of buttercup found in alpine Australia.
