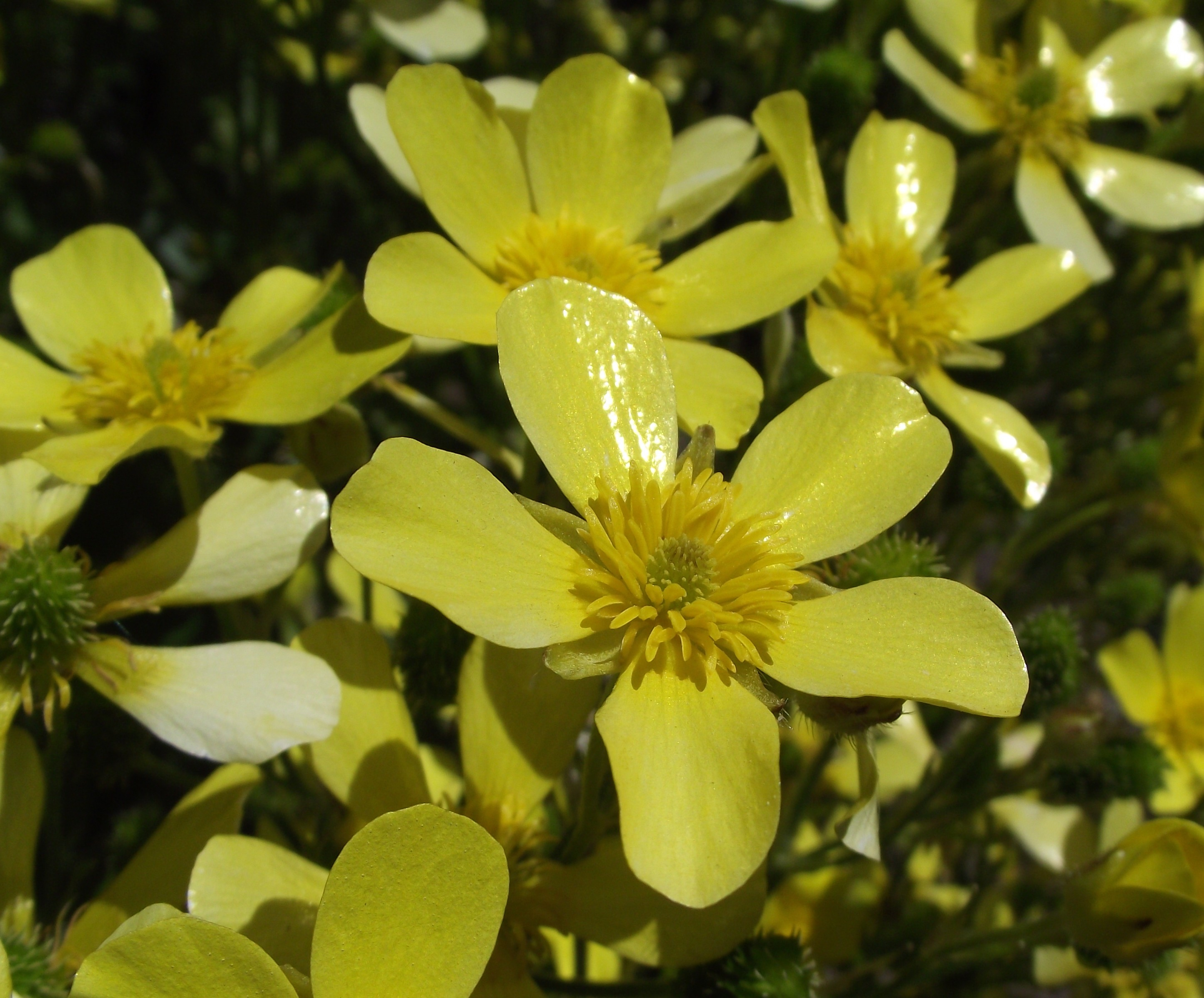

Scientific classification
- Kingdom: Plantae
- Clade: Tracheophytes
- Clade: Angiosperms
- Clade: Eudicots
- Order: Ranunculales
- Family: Ranunculaceae
- Genus: Ranunculus
- Species: R. cortusifolius

Binomial name
- Ranunculus cortusifolius Willd.

= Ranunculus cortusifolius =

Species of flowering plant

Ranunculus cortusifolius, also known as the Azores buttercup or Canary buttercup, is a plant species in the genus Ranunculus, family Ranunculaceae, the buttercup or crowfoot family. It grows on moister sites throughout the Azores, Madeira and Canary Islands but is widely cultivated elsewhere as an ornamental. There are reports of it having become naturalized in parts of California.

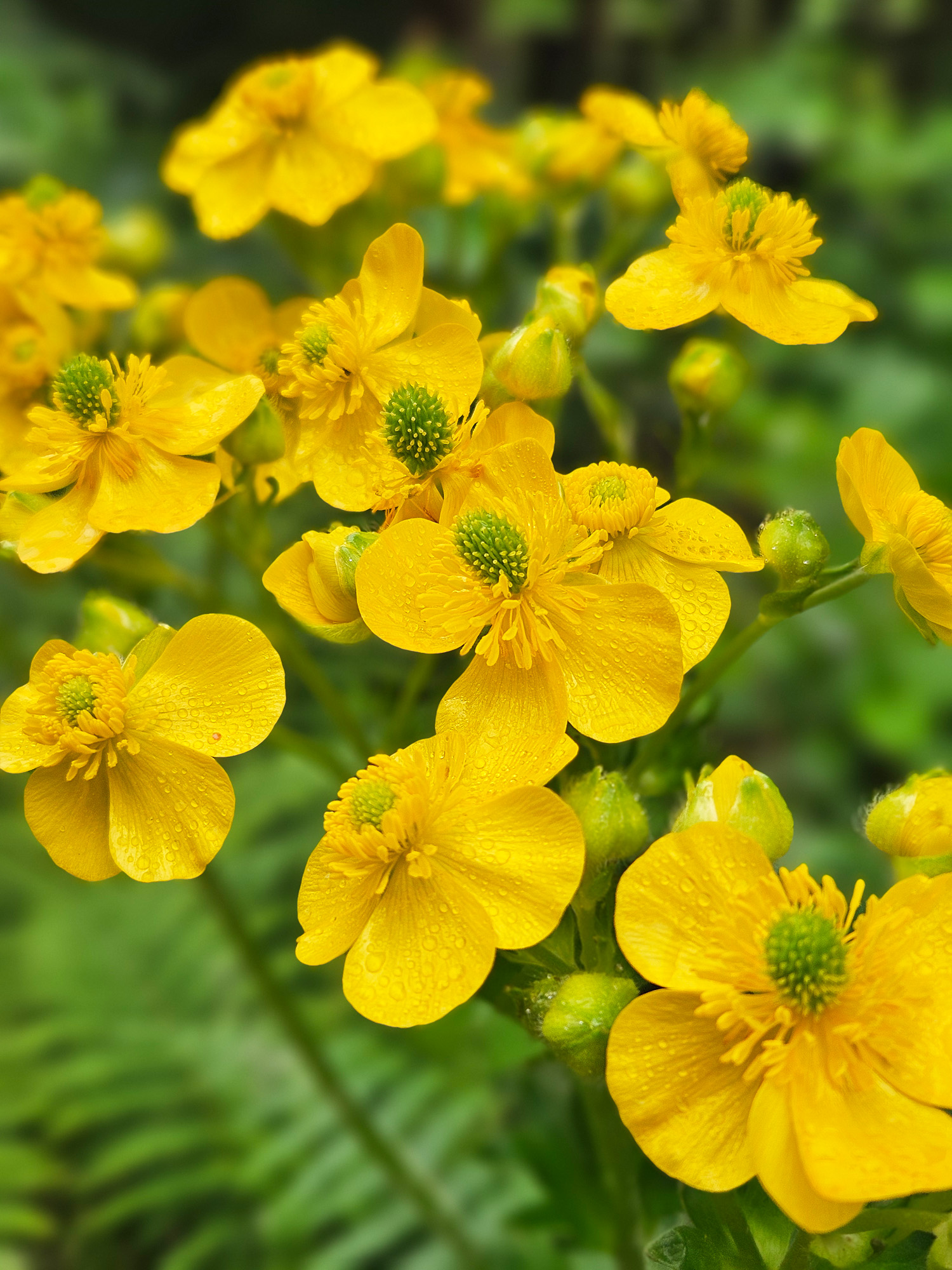
Ranunculus cortusifolius Willd., Azores

== Description ==
The plant has palmate lobed leaves and showy yellow flowers. Root grumose, formed of thick, fleshy, fascinated fibers. Stem two to four feet high, terete, and, as well as the foliage, hairy with rather pilose hairs, which are dilated at the base. Radical leaves on long hairy petioles, large, between orbicular and reniform, three to five-lobed; lobes again divided and cut into several acute lobules, or large sharp teeth, cut and serrated, the whole somewhat radiately and dichotomously veined; upper leaves gradually smaller, sessile, five- to three-partite, the segments lanceolate, coarsely serrated, with parallel veins. Flowers terminal, between cymose and paniculate. Petioles terete.

Calyx of five, ovato-lanceolate, very hairy, herbaceous sepals, pale and scariose at the margin. Petals five, large, broadly obovate, very glossy yellow. Stamens very numerous. Head of pistils short, oval. Ovary round-ovate, compressed, laterally hairy, tapering into a recurved style scarcely its own length. Head of fruit similar, but larger.

Interspecific hybridization

There is interspecific hybridization with Ranunculus cortusifolius and Ranunculus asiaticus. There are hybrids not available to commercial purpose where it’s hybridized for its multiple flowering habit. Similar to butterfly Ranunculus
