= Ranunculus canus =

Scientific classification
- Kingdom: Plantae
- Clade: Tracheophytes
- Clade: Angiosperms
- Clade: Eudicots
- Order: Ranunculales
- Family: Ranunculaceae
- Genus: Ranunculus
- Species: R. canus

Binomial name
- Ranunculus canus Benth.

Species of buttercup

Ranunculus canus is a species of buttercup known by the common name Sacramento Valley buttercup. It is endemic to California, where it grows in the Central Valley and adjacent mountain foothills, and the Transverse Ranges just south. It grows in grassland and meadows in woodland and forest habitat. This plant can be very similar in appearance to the California buttercup (Ranunculus californicus), and may be difficult to distinguish from it. It is variable in form. In general the plant is a perennial herb producing erect, usually hairy stems up to 65 centimeters tall. The hairy leaves are each made up of three leaflets, leaves occurring lower on the plant with wider leaflets which may be notched to lobed, and upper leaves with narrow, toothed leaflets. The flower has up to 23 shiny yellow petals and many yellow stamens and pistils at the center. The fruit is an achene, borne in a spherical cluster of 11 or more.
