= Ranunculus lobbii =

Conservation status
- Least Concern (IUCN 3.1)

Scientific classification
- Kingdom: Plantae
- Clade: Tracheophytes
- Clade: Angiosperms
- Clade: Eudicots
- Order: Ranunculales
- Family: Ranunculaceae
- Genus: Ranunculus
- Species: R. lobbii

Binomial name
- Ranunculus lobbii (Hiern) A.Gray

Synonyms
- Ranunculus aquatilis var. lobbii (Hiern) S.Watson; Ranunculus hederaceus var. lobbii (Hiern) G.Lawson; Ranunculus hydrocharis f. lobbii Hiern; Batrachium lobbii Howell

Species of buttercup

Ranunculus lobbii is a species of buttercup known by the common name Lobb's buttercup, or Lobb's aquatic buttercup in the family Ranunculaceae. It is native to a few areas in western North America, where it is reported from British Columbia, Oregon, and northern California. It is an aquatic plant, growing in various types of shallow-water habitat, including forest ponds and vernal pools. It is an annual herb producing submerged stems 20 to 80 centimeters long which may float at the surface. The blades of the leaves are tiny and divided into threadlike segments. If any leaves develop on stem parts which are exposed to air they are much different in morphology, developing larger, more robust leaves. Flowers have generally 5 petals which are white in color and about half a centimeter long. Many stamens and pistils fill the center of the flower. The fruit is an achene borne in a spherical cluster.
