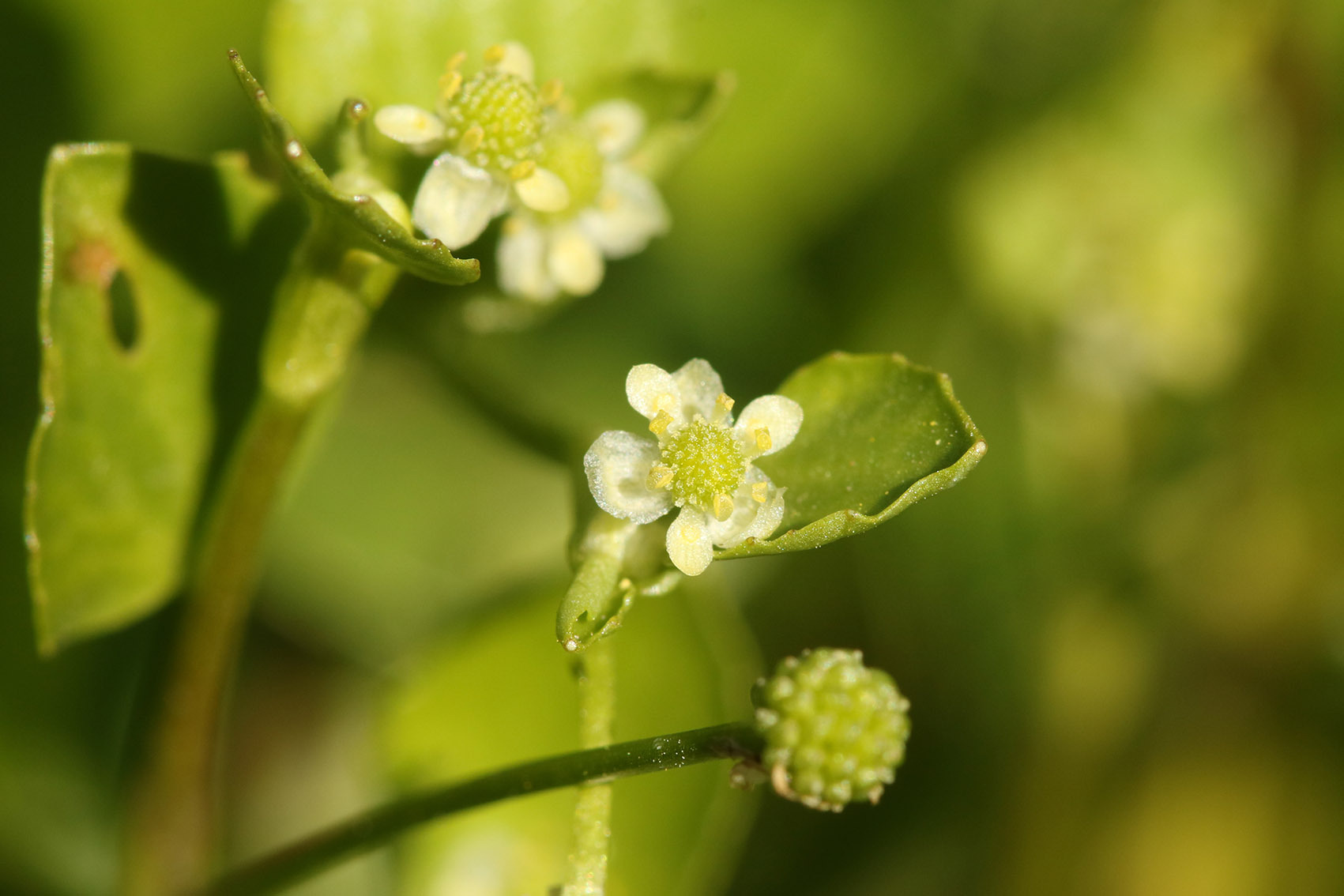

Scientific classification
- Kingdom: Plantae
- Clade: Tracheophytes
- Clade: Angiosperms
- Clade: Eudicots
- Order: Ranunculales
- Family: Ranunculaceae
- Genus: Ranunculus
- Species: R. bonariensis

Binomial name
- Ranunculus bonariensis Poir.

= Ranunculus bonariensis =

Species of buttercup

Ranunculus bonariensis is a species of buttercup known by the common name Carter's buttercup. There are three varieties. Two are native to Chile and Argentina, and one is found in central California in the United States.
