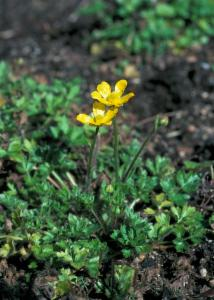

Scientific classification
- Kingdom: Plantae
- Clade: Tracheophytes
- Clade: Angiosperms
- Clade: Eudicots
- Order: Ranunculales
- Family: Ranunculaceae
- Genus: Ranunculus
- Species: R. pimpinellifolius

Binomial name
- Ranunculus pimpinellifolius Hook.

= Ranunculus pimpinellifolius =

Bog buttercup

Species of buttercup

Ranunculus pimpinellifolius, commonly known as bog buttercup, is a flowering plant in the family Ranunculaceae and grows in eastern Australia. It is a low growing perennial with divided green leaves and yellow flowers.

== Description ==
Ranunculus pimpinellifolius is a perennial herb covered with soft, weak hairs or almost smooth. The leaves are mostly at the base of the stems, pinnately divided into 3-7 segments, segments usually with three lobes and rounded teeth, oval to oblong-shaped, 1–5 cm (0.39–1.97 in) long on a petiole 2–12 cm (0.79–4.72 in) long and sparse to thickly covered in spreading hairs. The flowering stems are upright or spreading, simple or occasionally branched with up to five flowers 5–15 mm (0.20–0.59 in) in diameter and usually five narrowly egg-shaped to oval petals, 4–9 mm (0.16–0.35 in) long, 1.5–4 mm (0.059–0.157 in) wide, shiny and yellow. Flowering occurs from November to January and the fruit is a smooth achene 2–2.8 mm (0.079–0.110 in) long and gradually tapering to a recurved beak 0.5–1 mm (0.020–0.039 in) long.

== Taxonomy and naming ==
Ranunculus pimpinellifolius was first formally described in 1834 by William Jackson Hooker and the description was published in The Journal of Botany.

== Distribution and habitat ==
Bog buttercup grows in boggy locations, wet grasslands and herbfields at higher altitudes in New South Wales, Victoria, Tasmania and the Australian Capital Territory.
