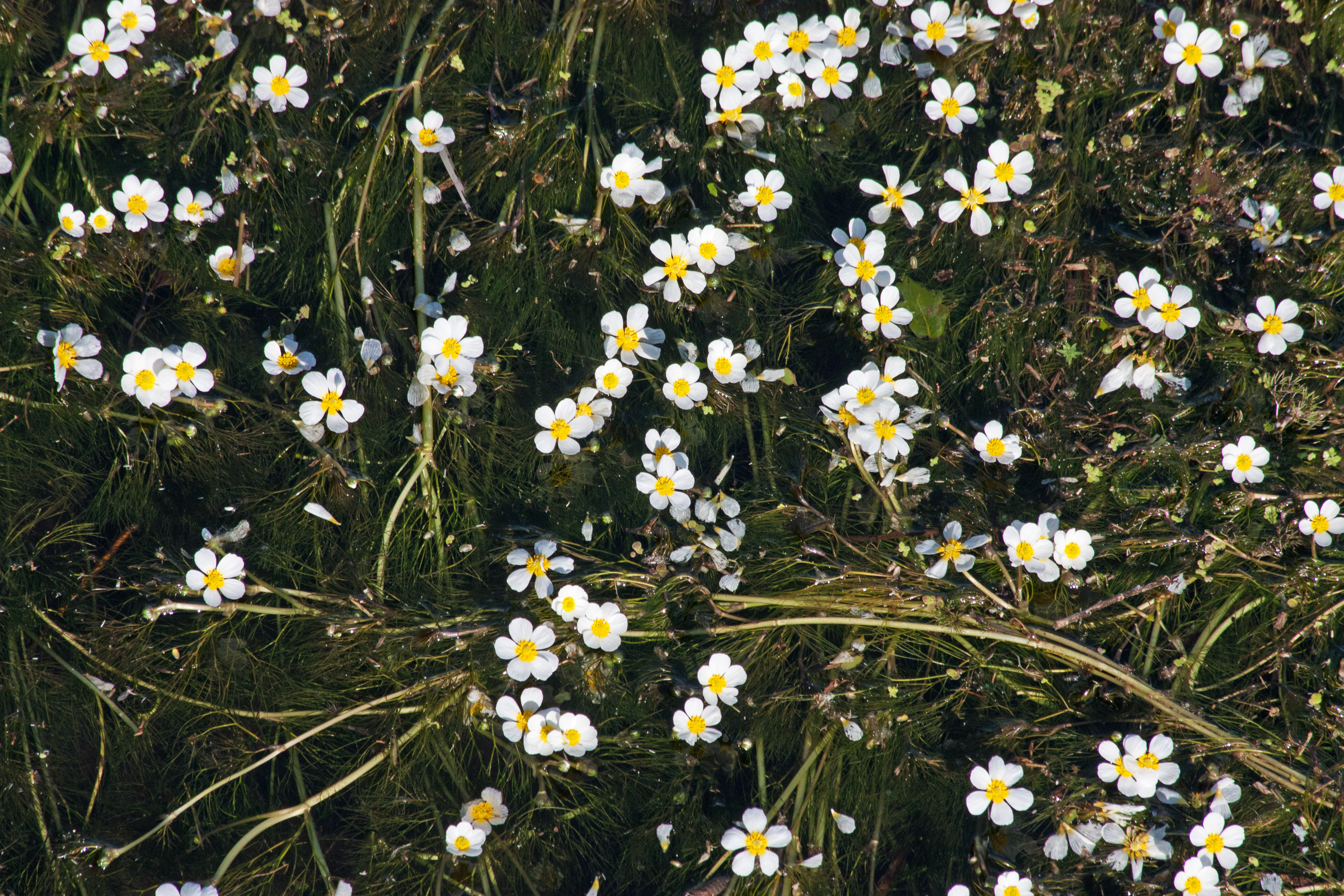

Conservation status
- Least Concern (IUCN 3.1)

Scientific classification
- Kingdom: Plantae
- Clade: Tracheophytes
- Clade: Angiosperms
- Clade: Eudicots
- Order: Ranunculales
- Family: Ranunculaceae
- Genus: Ranunculus
- Species: R. penicillatus

Binomial name
- Ranunculus penicillatus (Dumort.) Bab.

= Ranunculus penicillatus =

Species of flowering plant

Ranunculus penicillatus is a species of flowering plant belonging to the family Ranunculaceae.

Its native range is Europe and Morocco.

Synonyms:

- Batrachium penicillatum Dumort.
- Ranunculus cambricus A.Benn. ex Druce
