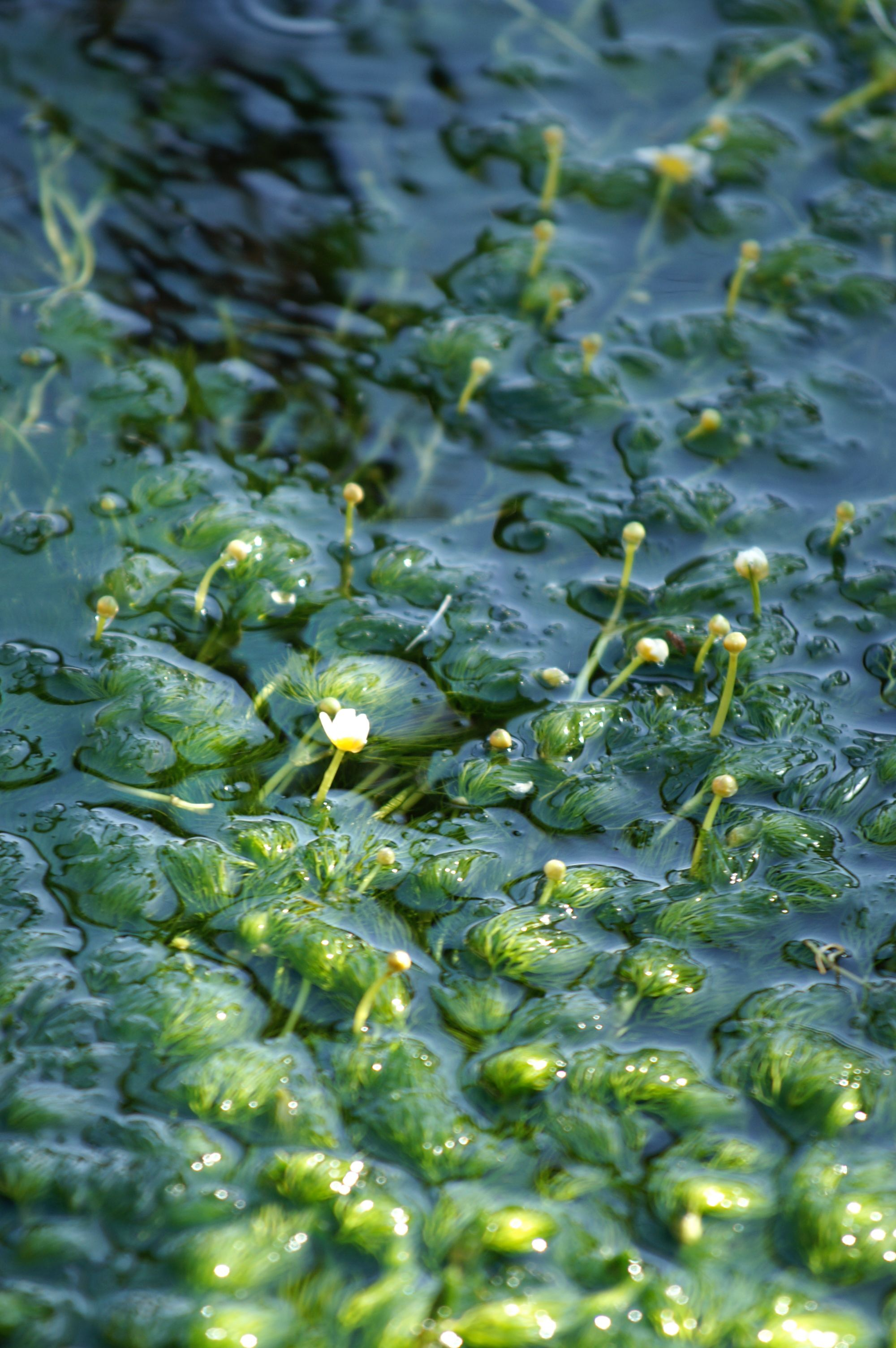

Scientific classification
- Kingdom: Plantae
- Clade: Tracheophytes
- Clade: Angiosperms
- Clade: Eudicots
- Order: Ranunculales
- Family: Ranunculaceae
- Genus: Ranunculus
- Species: R. nipponicus

Binomial name
- Ranunculus nipponicus (Makino & Nemoto) Nakai

Synonyms
- Homotypic Synonyms: Batrachium nipponicum (Makino & Nemoto) Kitam.; Ranunculus aquatilis var. nipponicus Makino & Nemoto; Heterotypic Synonyms: Batrachium nipponicum var. major (H.Hara) Kitam.; Batrachium yesoense (Nakai) Kitam.; Ranunculus aquatilis var. japonicus Nakai; Ranunculus nipponicus var. japonicus (Nakai) H.Hara; Ranunculus nipponicus var. major H.Hara; Ranunculus trichophyllus f. nemorensis Miyabe & Kudô; Ranunculus yesoensis Nakai

= Ranunculus nipponicus =

Species of aquatic flowering plant

Ranunculus nipponicus is a species of aquatic flowering plant in the family Ranunculaceae. It is native to eastern Russia and Japan. The species has been proposed to be useful for cleaning-up nitrate-contaminated groundwater as the shoots can actively uptake nitrate from cool (15 °C) water.
