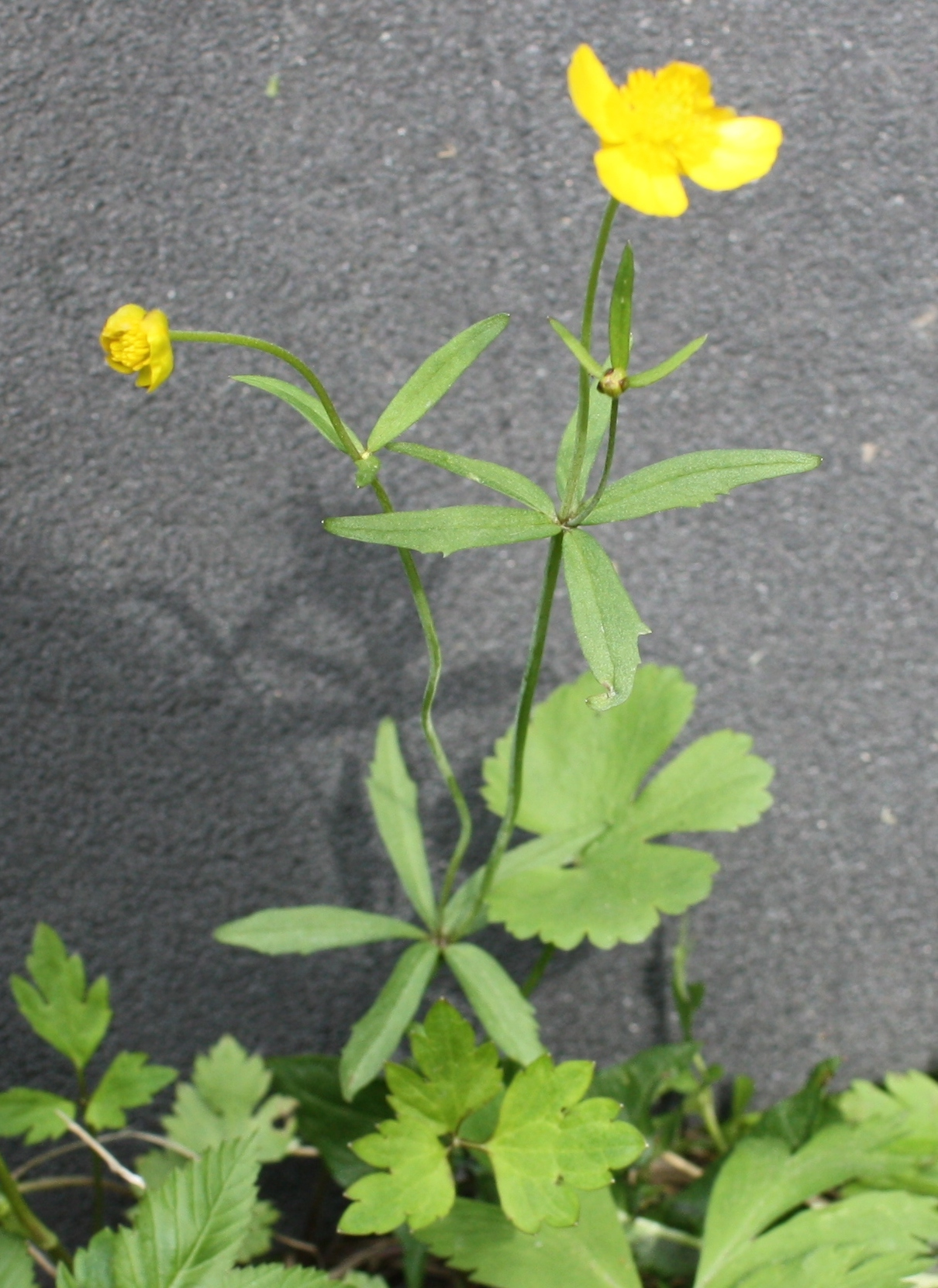

Scientific classification
- Kingdom: Plantae
- Clade: Tracheophytes
- Clade: Angiosperms
- Clade: Eudicots
- Order: Ranunculales
- Family: Ranunculaceae
- Genus: Ranunculus
- Species: R. fallax

Binomial name
- Ranunculus fallax Wimm. & Grab.

= Ranunculus fallax =

Species of flowering plant

Ranunculus fallax is a species of flowering plant belonging to the family Ranunculaceae.

Its native range is Sweden to Ukraine.
