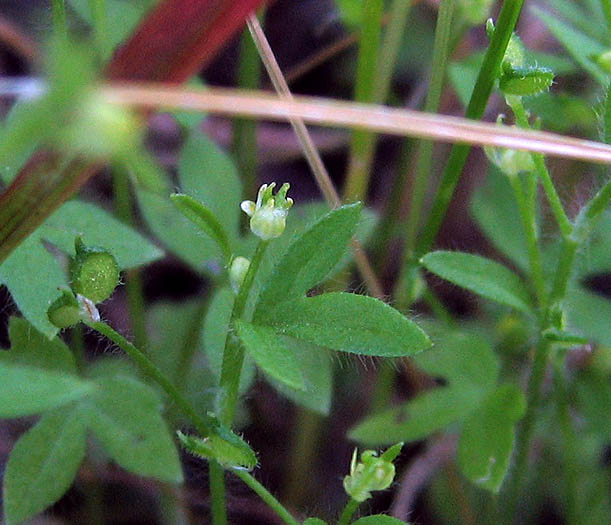

Scientific classification
- Kingdom: Plantae
- Clade: Tracheophytes
- Clade: Angiosperms
- Clade: Eudicots
- Order: Ranunculales
- Family: Ranunculaceae
- Genus: Ranunculus
- Species: R. hebecarpus

Binomial name
- Ranunculus hebecarpus Hook. & Arn.

= Ranunculus hebecarpus =

Species of buttercup

Ranunculus hebecarpus is a species of buttercup known by the common name delicate buttercup. It is native to western North America, including several of the western United States and Baja California, where it grows in grassland, woodland, and chaparral habitat. It is an annual herb producing a slender, hairy stem a few centimeters high or up to 30 centimeters tall. The hairy leaves are borne on long petioles. Their blades are deeply lobed or divided into three leaflets, often with toothed or lobed edges. Flowers have 3 to 5 tiny yellow petals just 1 or 2 millimeters long studded on the bulbous nectary; some flowers lack petals. The plant is most easily identified in its fruiting stage, when the infructescence is a spherical cluster of several tiny disc-shaped achenes with compressed, bristly sides.
