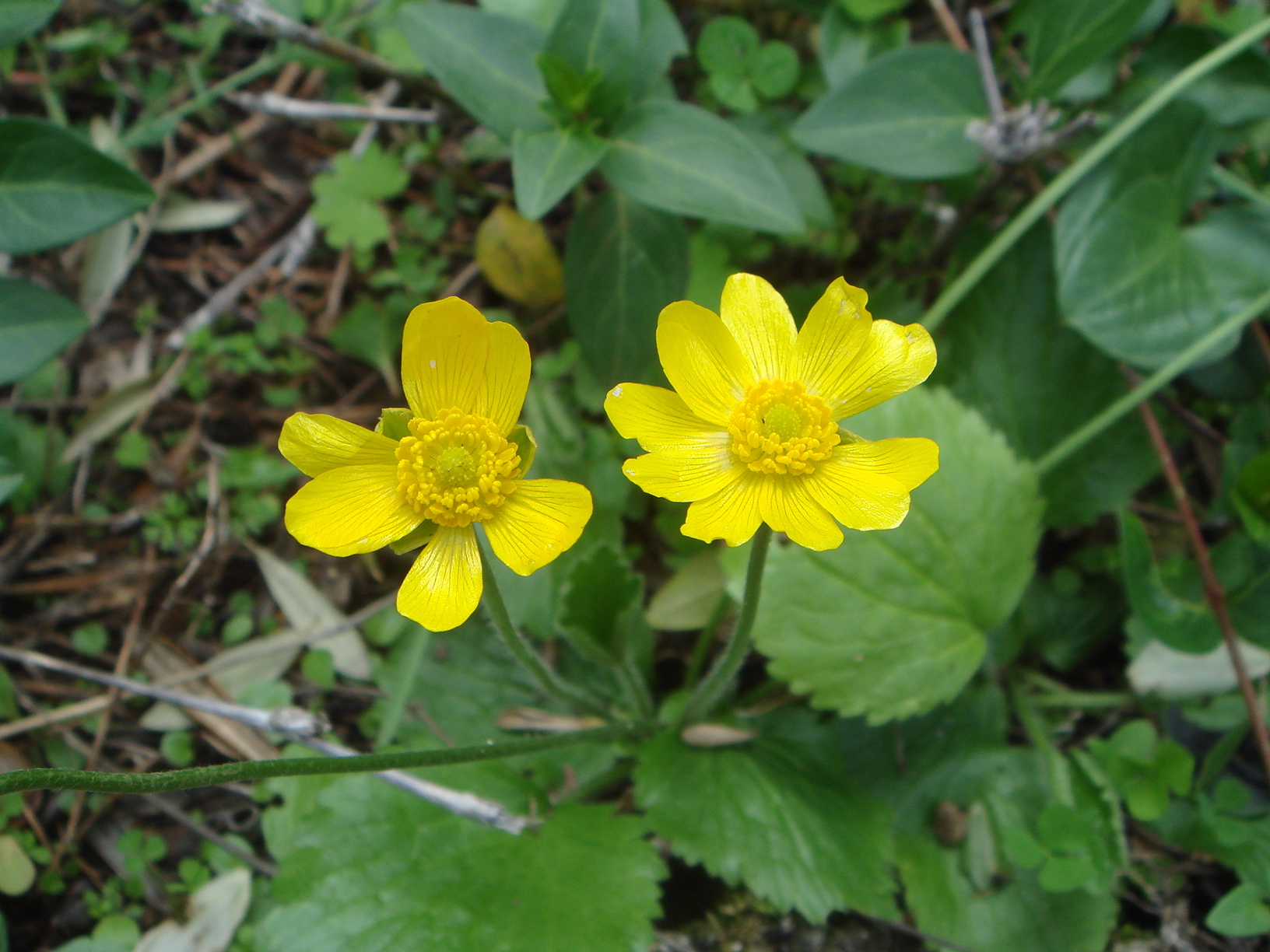

Scientific classification
- Kingdom: Plantae
- Clade: Tracheophytes
- Clade: Angiosperms
- Clade: Eudicots
- Order: Ranunculales
- Family: Ranunculaceae
- Genus: Ranunculus
- Species: R. bullatus

Binomial name
- Ranunculus bullatus L.

Synonyms
- Ionosmanthus plantagineus; Ionosmanthus rhombifolius; Ionosmanthus semicalvus; Ranunculus plantagineus; Ranunculus rhombifolius; Ranunculus semicalvus; Ranunculus supranudus

= Ranunculus bullatus =

Species of flowering plant

Ranunculus bullatus, commonly known as autumn buttercup, is a perennial member of the buttercup family Ranunculaceae, native to Europe and north Africa, including most Mediterranean islands.

== Description ==
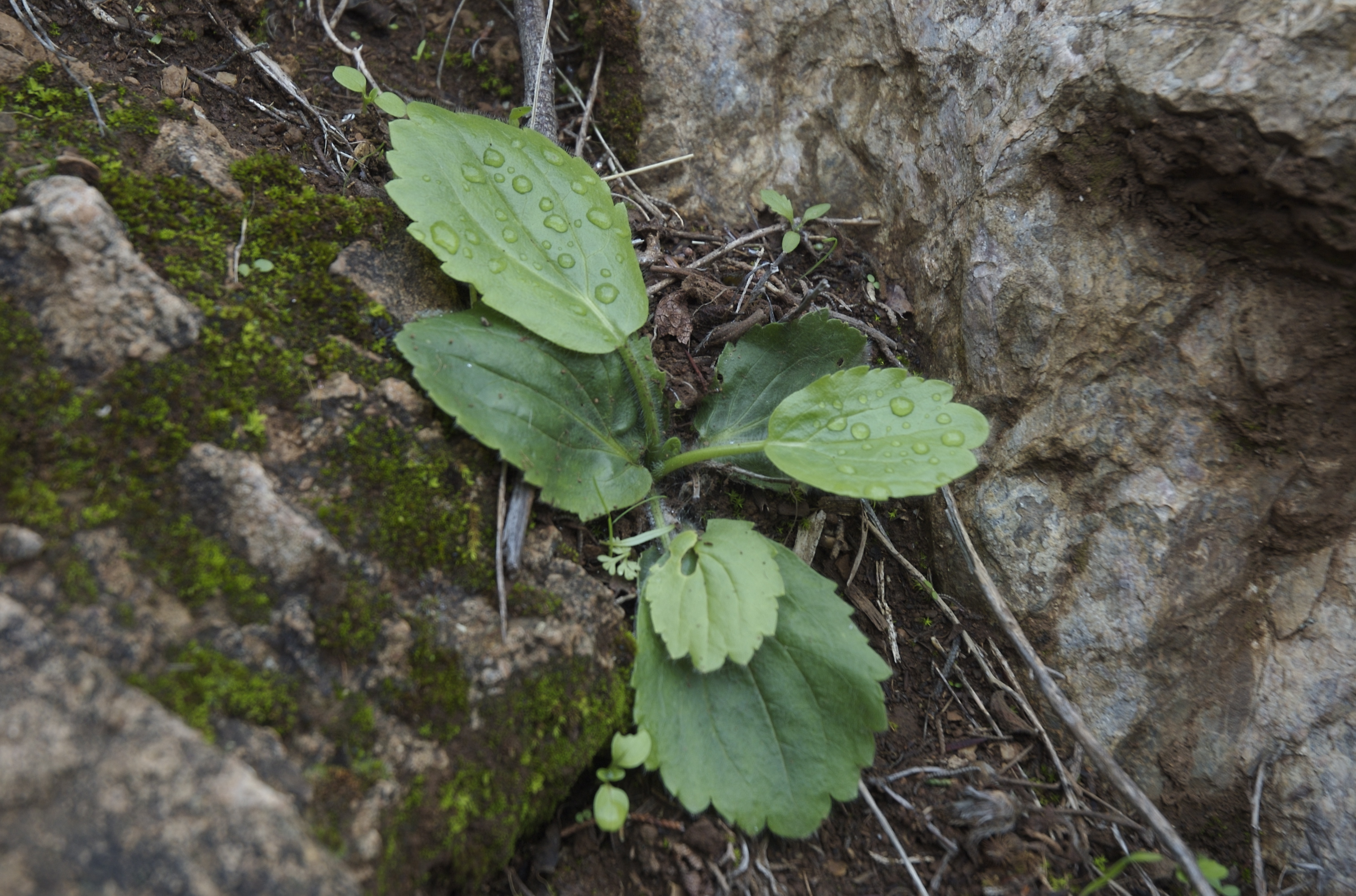
Oval, toothed leaves

Its leaves, which only grow at the base of the stem, are 2–6 cm long, oval, and have broad rounded teeth. Each plant has 1 or 2 flowers which are yellow, scented and about 25mm in diameter. Each has 5-12 petals which are slightly irregular. It flowers from October to December, often covering large areas of ground.

== Distribution and habitat ==
Grows throughout the Mediterranean region, including north Africa, in rocky places, olive groves and dry fields, from sea-level up to 900m.

== Etymology ==
In Latin Rānunculus means "little frog", from rāna "frog", and bullatus means "inflated".

== Subspecies ==
There are three subspecies, Ranunculus bullatus subsp. bullatus (L.) which grows in the Iberian Peninsula, France and Italy; Ranunculus bullatus subsp. cytheraeus (Halácsy) which grows in the eastern Mediterranean including Libya; and Ranunculus bullatus subsp. supranudus (Jordan & Fourr.) which grows in Morocco, Algeria and Tunisia.
