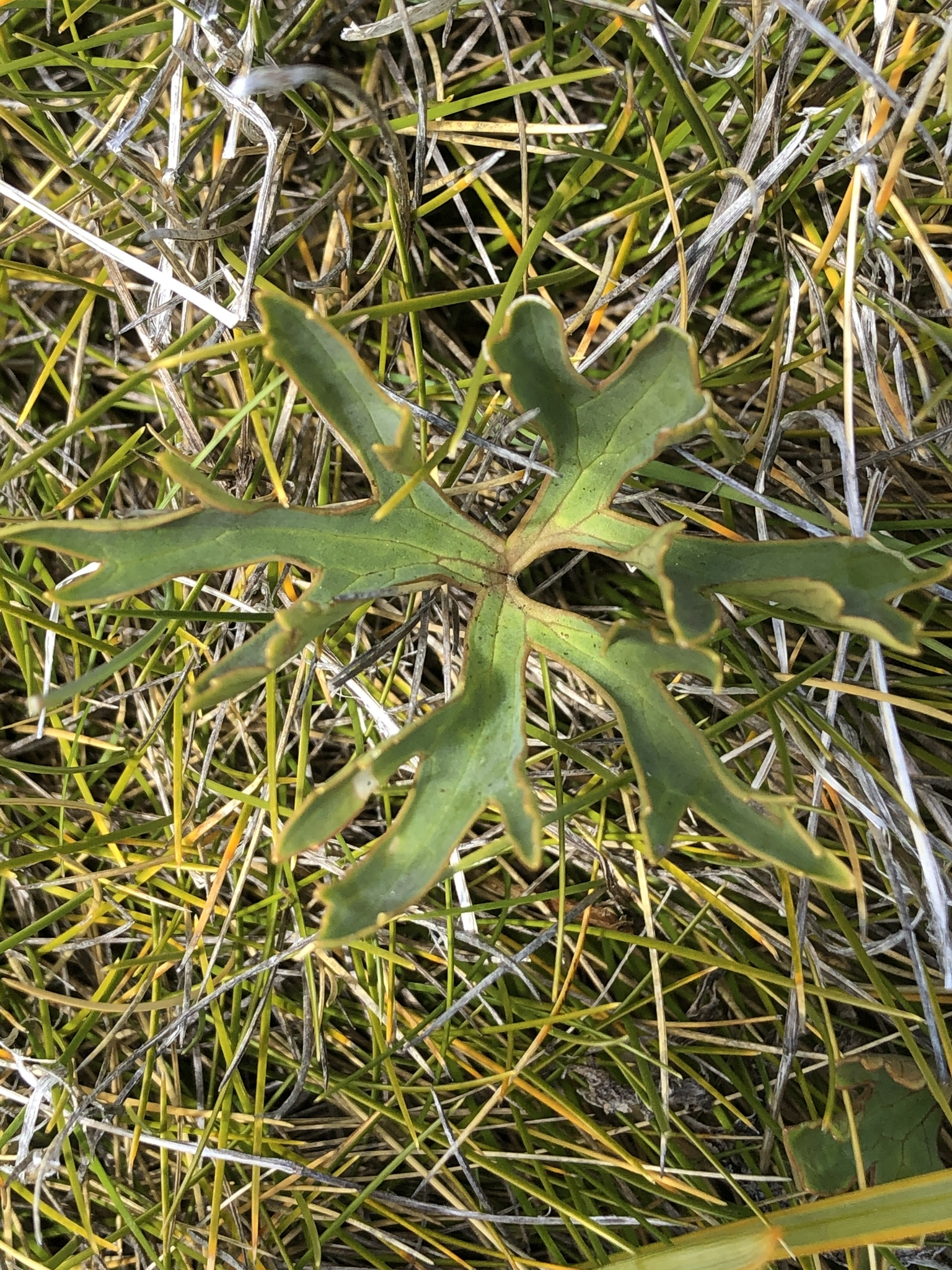
- Ranunculus verticillatus in Nelson Lakes National Park

Conservation status
- Not Threatened (NZ TCS)

Scientific classification
- Kingdom: Plantae
- Clade: Embryophytes
- Clade: Tracheophytes
- Clade: Spermatophytes
- Clade: Angiosperms
- Clade: Eudicots
- Order: Ranunculales
- Family: Ranunculaceae
- Genus: Ranunculus
- Species: R. verticillatus

Binomial name
- Ranunculus verticillatus Kirk

= Ranunculus verticillatus =

Species of flowering plant

Ranunculus verticillatus is a species of buttercup, endemic to New Zealand.

== Description ==
A typical Ranunculus, with green leaves and a yellow flower. The leaves are deeply divided.

== Range ==
Endemic to New Zealand, known from both the North and South Island

== Habitat ==
Wet areas.

== Ecology ==
Ranunculus verticillatus is an indicator of wetlands.

Phytomyza costata, a leaf miner, uses the leaves for its mines.

== Etymology ==
Verticillatus is an adjectival form of the Latin verticillus, which would mean 'whorled'.

== Taxonomy ==
Formerly, this species name was also used for other species of Ranunculus, and was included on lists of plants from other areas, like Vermont.
