= Ranunculus gormanii =

Scientific classification
- Kingdom: Plantae
- Clade: Tracheophytes
- Clade: Angiosperms
- Clade: Eudicots
- Order: Ranunculales
- Family: Ranunculaceae
- Genus: Ranunculus
- Species: R. gormanii

Binomial name
- Ranunculus gormanii Greene

Species of buttercup

Ranunculus gormanii is a species of buttercup known by the common name Gorman's buttercup. It is native to Oregon and northern California, where it grows in the Klamath Mountains and a section of the southern Cascade Range. It can be found in moist areas in mountain forests and meadows. It is a perennial herb producing prostrate stems which extend along the ground up to 20 centimeters in length, sometimes rooting at nodes that come in contact with wet substrate. The leaves have oval blades up to 4 centimeters wide which are borne on petioles up to 7 centimeters in length. Flowers have 5 to 7 shiny yellow petals each a few millimeters long and many stamens and pistils. The fruit is an achene borne in a spherical cluster of up to 15.
