= Ranunculus luminarius =

Scientific classification
- Kingdom: Plantae
- Clade: Tracheophytes
- Clade: Angiosperms
- Clade: Eudicots
- Order: Ranunculales
- Family: Ranunculaceae
- Genus: Ranunculus
- Species: R. luminarius

Binomial name
- Ranunculus luminarius Pignatti ex Greuter

Species of plant

Ranunculus luminarius is a species of flowering plant in the family Ranunculaceae, native to Italy. It is a member of the Ranunculus auricomus complex.
