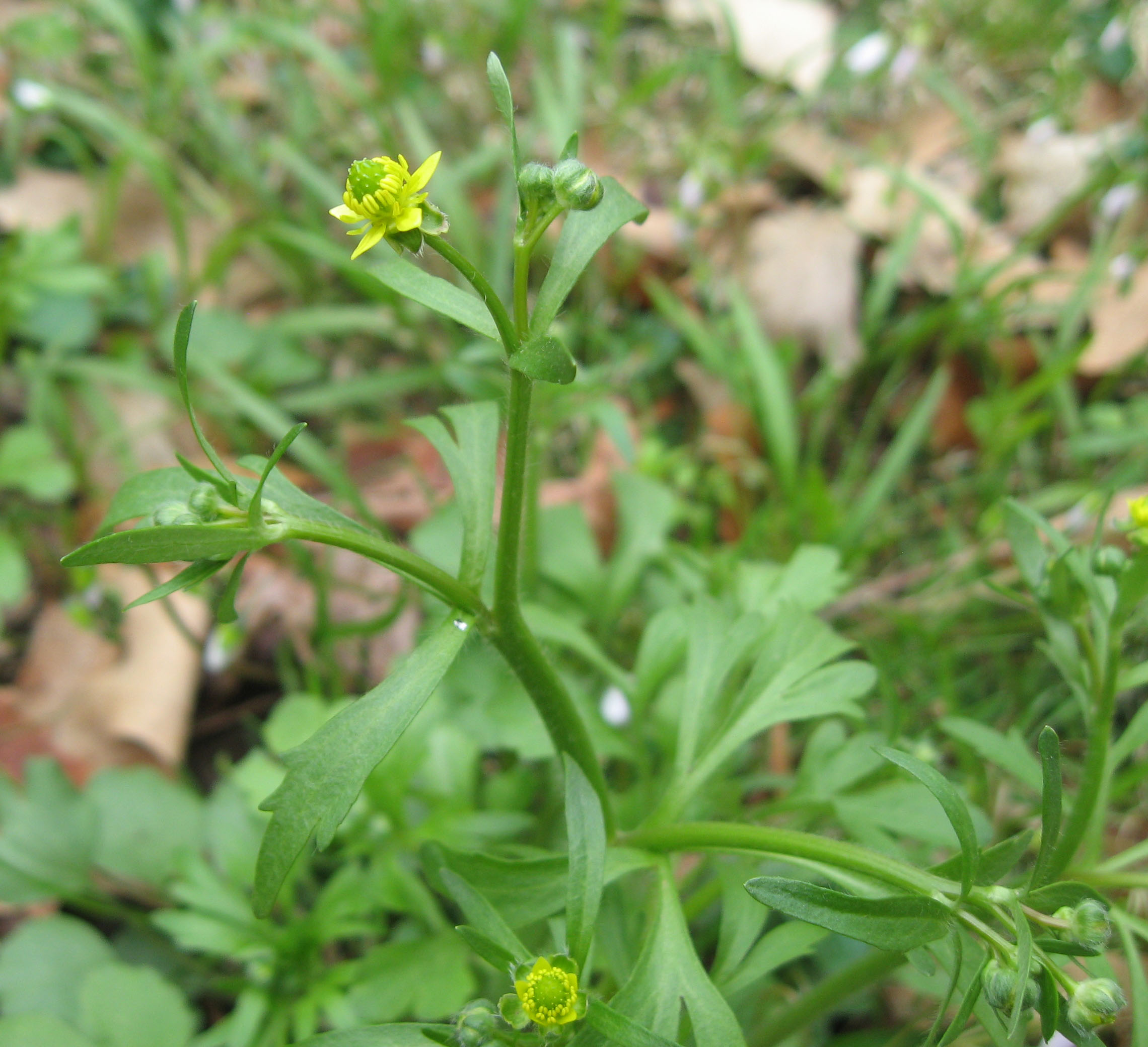

Scientific classification
- Kingdom: Plantae
- Clade: Tracheophytes
- Clade: Angiosperms
- Clade: Eudicots
- Order: Ranunculales
- Family: Ranunculaceae
- Genus: Ranunculus
- Species: R. micranthus

Binomial name
- Ranunculus micranthus Nutt. 1838

= Ranunculus micranthus =

Species of flowering plant

Ranunculus micranthus is a flowering plant species in the Ranunculus (buttercup) genus known by the common names rock buttercup and small-flowered crowfoot. It is native to North America, with a distribution that covers much of the eastern United States. R. micranthus is very similar in appearance to R. abortivus (small-flowered buttercup). The distinguishing characteristics are the hairiness of their receptacles and shininess of their achenes.
