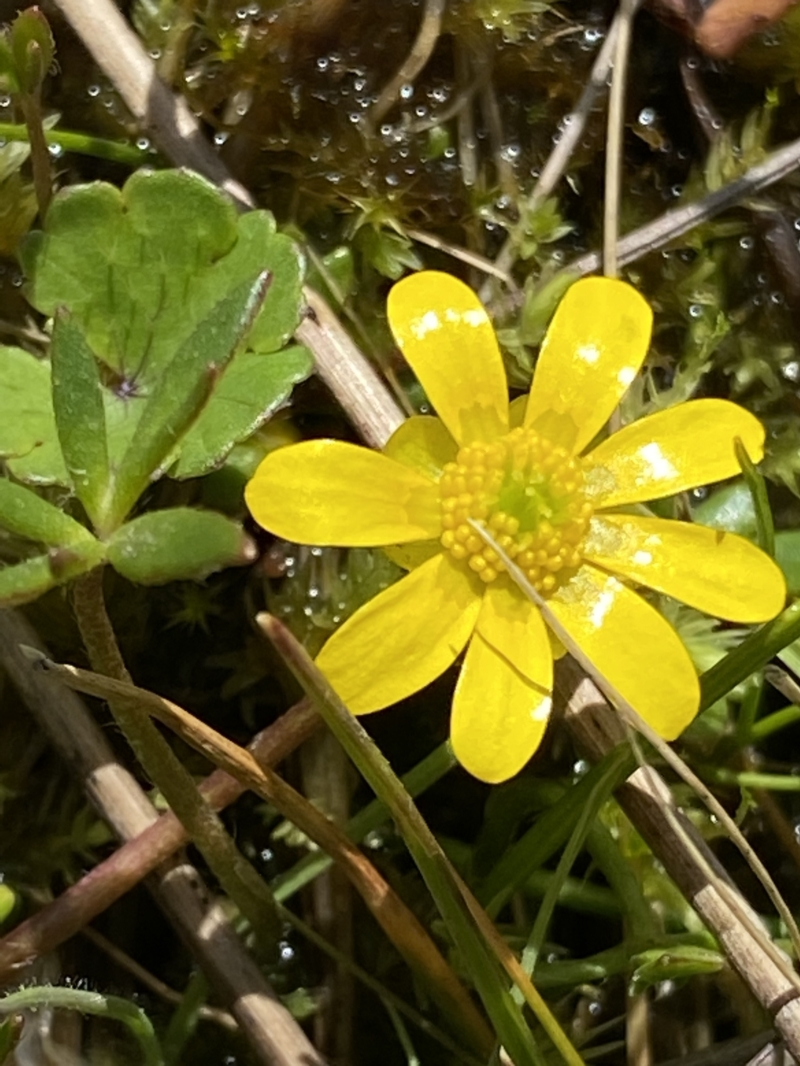

Conservation status
- Not Threatened (NZ TCS)

Scientific classification
- Kingdom: Plantae
- Clade: Tracheophytes
- Clade: Angiosperms
- Clade: Eudicots
- Order: Ranunculales
- Family: Ranunculaceae
- Genus: Ranunculus
- Species: R. amphitrichus

Binomial name
- Ranunculus amphitrichus Colenso

= Ranunculus amphitrichus =

Small river buttercup

Species of buttercup

Ranunculus amphitrichus commonly known as the small river buttercup, is a flowering plant in the family Ranunculaceae. It has glossy green leaves, daisy-like yellow flowers and grows in Western Australia, southeastern Australia and New Zealand.

== Description ==
Ranunculus amphitrichus is an aquatic perennial, stems arising from leaf clusters and sparsely covered with soft, weak, thin hairs or smooth. The leaves are a glossy green, more or less circular, 1–10 cm (0.39–3.94 in) in diameter, lobed, sometimes floating, petiole 5–24 cm (2.0–9.4 in) long, yellow flowers on branched or simple stems 7–35 cm (2.8–13.8 in) long, usually five petals, narrowly oblanceolate or oblong and wedge-shaped at the base, 3–5 mm (0.12–0.20 in) long and 0.8–1.8 mm (0.031–0.071 in) wide. Flowering occurs from December to March and the fruit is a green achene thickly covered with soft, weak hairs.

== Taxonomy and naming ==
Ranunculus amphitrichus was first formally described in 1885 by William Colenso and the description was published in Transactions and Proceedings of the New Zealand Institute. The specific epithet (amphitrichus) means "both sides" and "hair".

== Distribution and habitat ==
Small river buttercup grows in swamps, lakes and slow-flowing streams in shallow water in Western Australia, South Australia, New South Wales, Tasmania, Australian Capital Territory and New Zealand.
