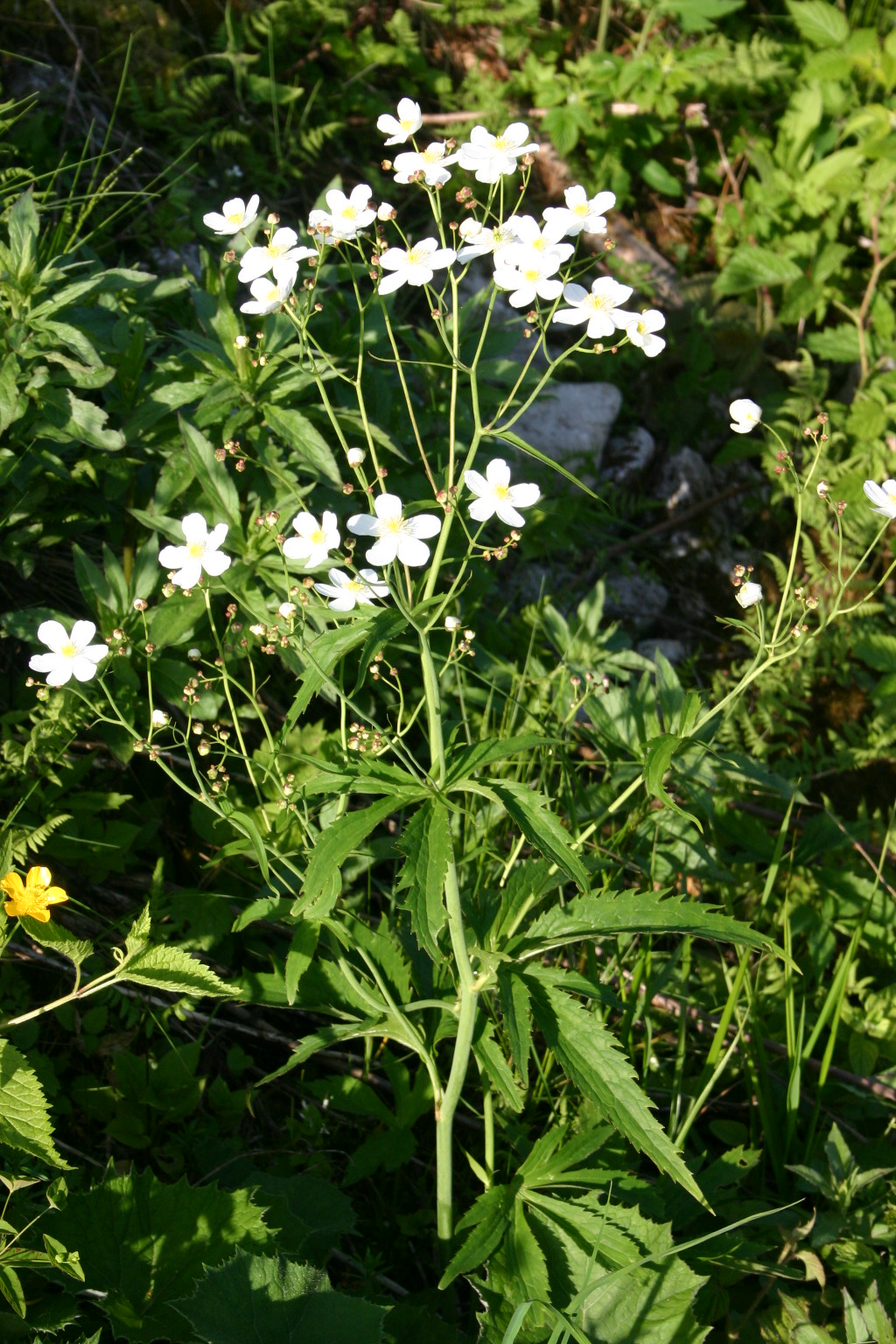

Scientific classification
- Kingdom: Plantae
- Clade: Tracheophytes
- Clade: Angiosperms
- Clade: Eudicots
- Order: Ranunculales
- Family: Ranunculaceae
- Genus: Ranunculus
- Species: R. platanifolius

Binomial name
- Ranunculus platanifolius L.

= Ranunculus platanifolius =

Species of herb

Ranunculus platanifolius, the large white buttercup, is a species of perennial herb of the buttercup family (Ranunculaceae) growing in mountains of Europe.

== Description ==
The large white buttercup is an herbaceous plant 30 – 100 cm tall, with glabrous stem with many branches.

The leaves are palmate, each divided into five segments with dentate margin. Flowers are organized into cymes; each flower has a calyx with five sepals, a corolla with five white petals, many stamens with yellow anthers and many styles.

Fruits are hooked achenes.

== Distribution and habitat ==
This plant lives in mountain woods and forests of Europe, from 800 to 2000 m above sea level.

== Toxicity ==
As other Ranunculaceae, this plant is toxic because it contains anemonin.
