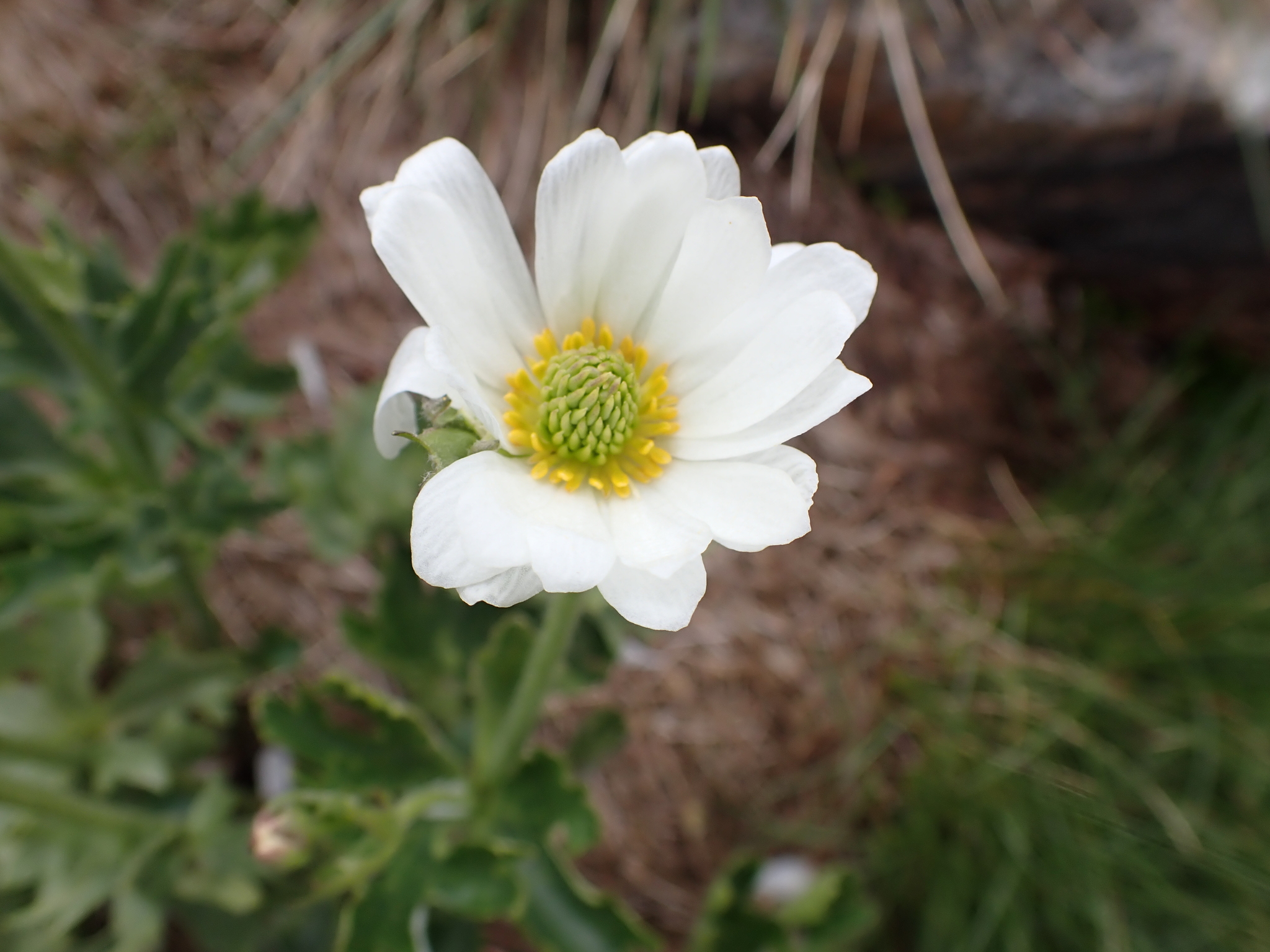
- In New South Wales, Australia

Scientific classification
- Kingdom: Plantae
- Clade: Tracheophytes
- Clade: Angiosperms
- Clade: Eudicots
- Order: Ranunculales
- Family: Ranunculaceae
- Genus: Ranunculus
- Species: R. anemoneus

Binomial name
- Ranunculus anemoneus F.Muell.

= Ranunculus anemoneus =

Species of buttercup

Ranunculus anemoneus, commonly known as the anemone buttercup, is an endangered species of buttercup found in alpine Australia.

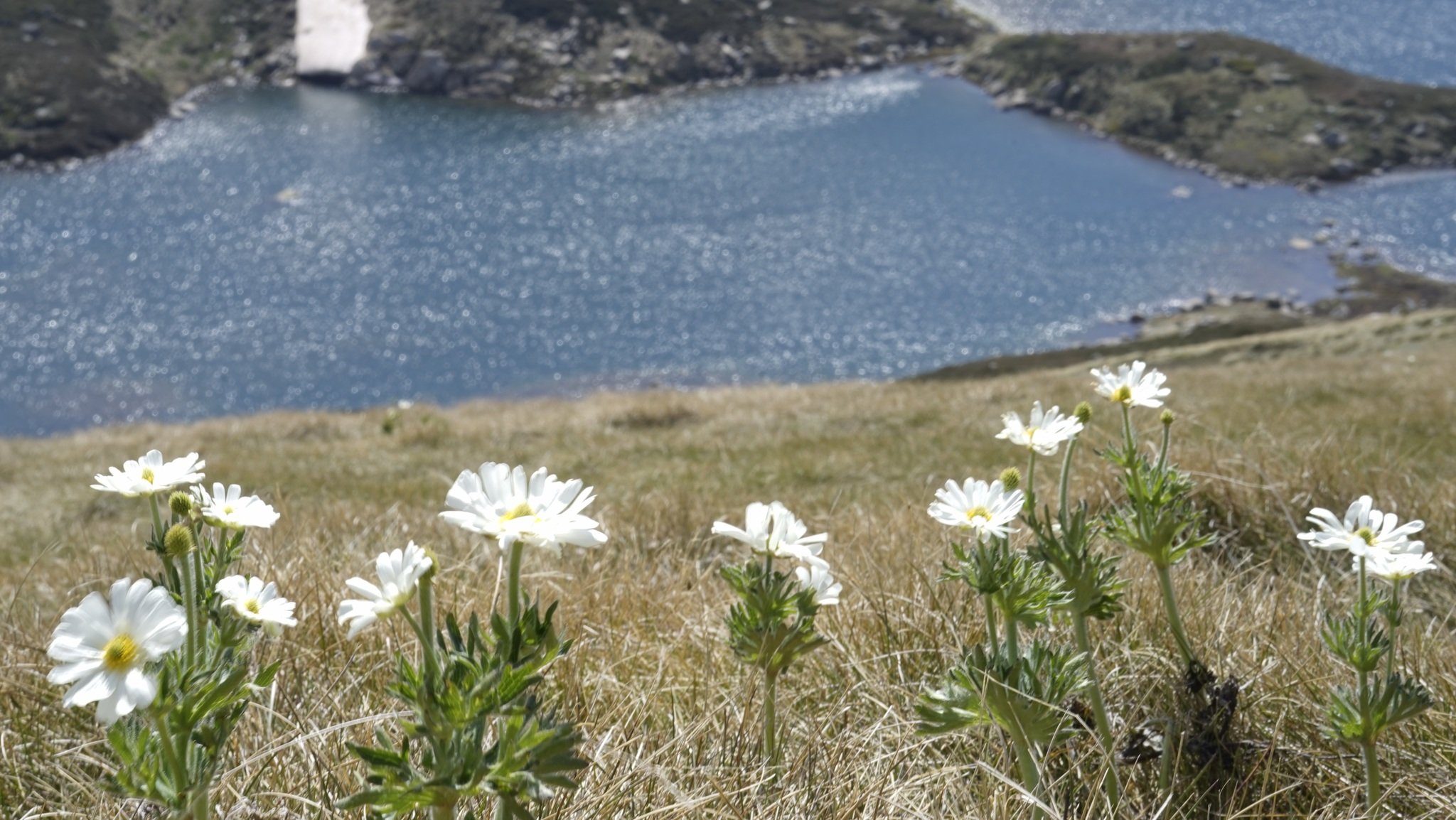
Above Lake Albina, New South Wales
