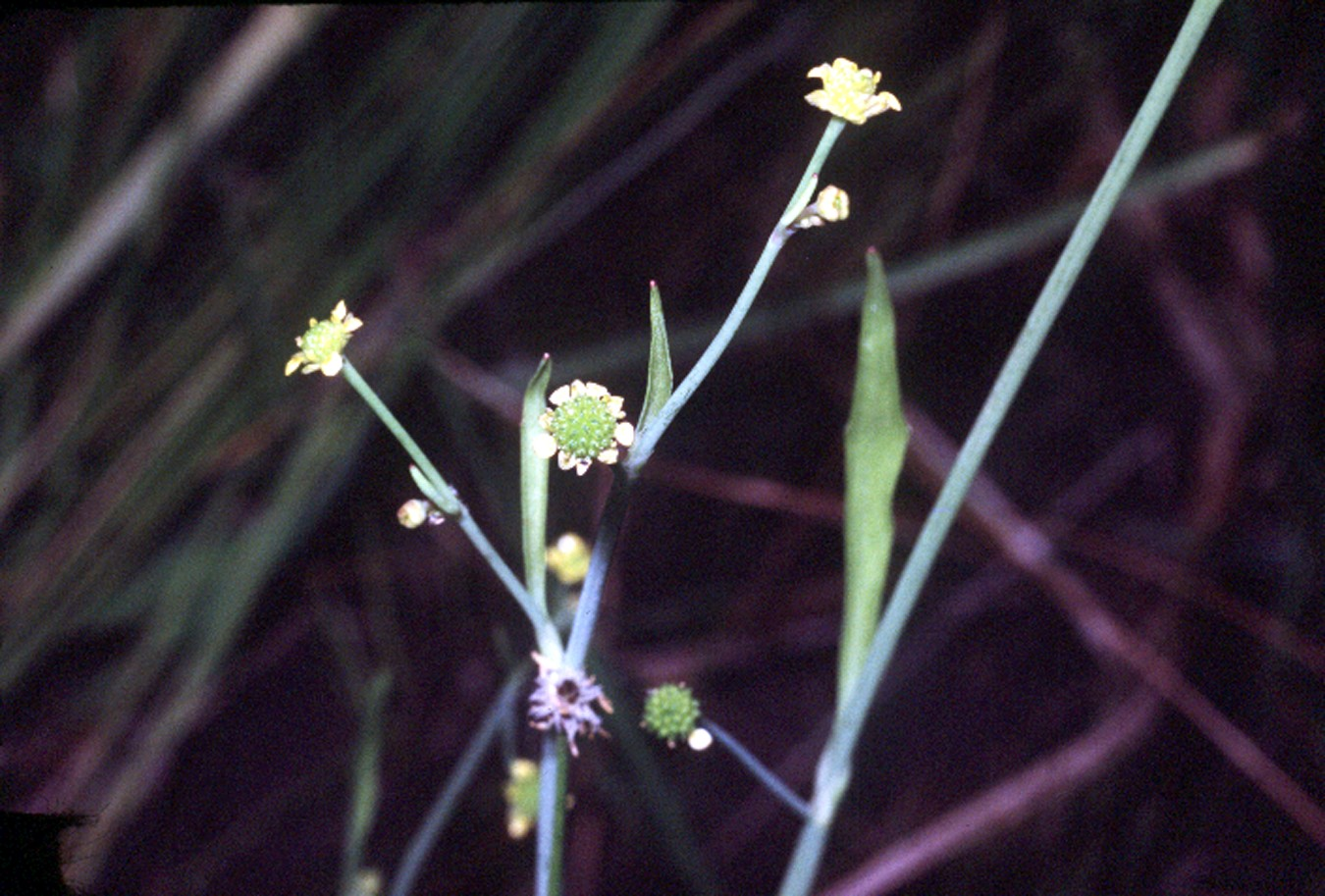

Scientific classification
- Kingdom: Plantae
- Clade: Tracheophytes
- Clade: Angiosperms
- Clade: Eudicots
- Order: Ranunculales
- Family: Ranunculaceae
- Genus: Ranunculus
- Species: R. pusillus

Binomial name
- Ranunculus pusillus Poir.

Synonyms
- Ranunculus lindheimeri Ranunculus oblongifolius Ranunculus tener

= Ranunculus pusillus =

Species of flowering plant

Ranunculus pusillus, commonly called low spearwort, is a species of flowering plant in the buttercup family (Ranunculaceae). It is native to much of the eastern United States from New York to Florida and west to Texas; it is also known in California. It grows in wet habitat, where it is semi-aquatic growing partially submerged or terrestrially on muddy substrates.

It is a perennial herb producing a slender decumbent to erect stem up to half a meter in length. It is generally hairless in texture. Leaves have blades which are lance-shaped to oval and borne on short petioles. The flower has one to three tiny yellow petals no more than 2 millimeters (0.079 in) long around a central receptacle with many stamens and pistils. Flowers are produced in the spring. The fruit is an achene borne in a spherical cluster of 18 or more.

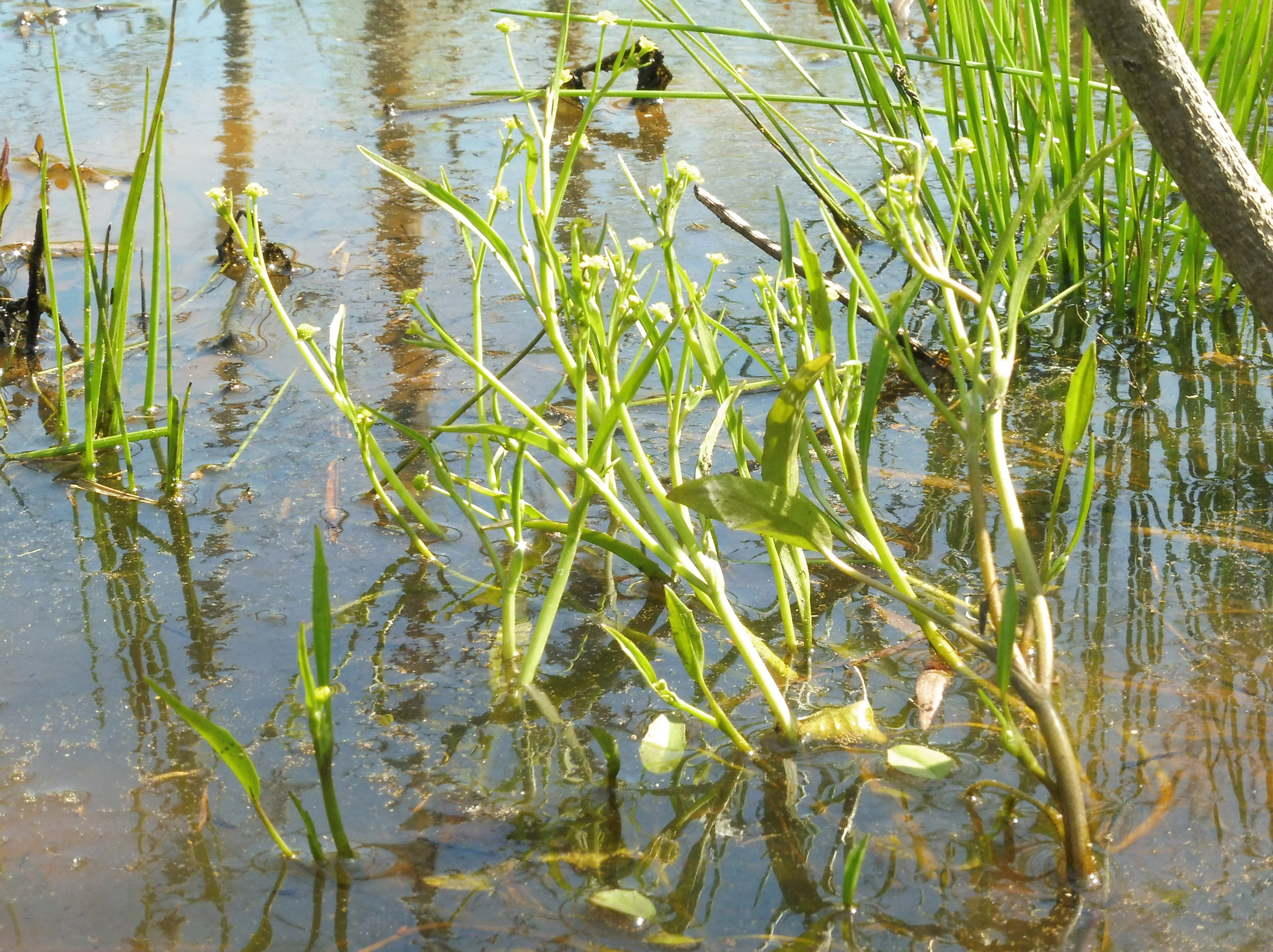
Ranunculus pusillus, showing emergent growth habit
