= Ranunculus oz =

Scientific classification
- Kingdom: Plantae
- Clade: Tracheophytes
- Clade: Angiosperms
- Clade: Eudicots
- Order: Ranunculales
- Family: Ranunculaceae
- Genus: Ranunculus
- Species: R. oz

Binomial name
- Ranunculus oz Christenh. & Byng

Synonyms
- Myosurus apetalus var. australis (F.Muell.) K.C.Davis; Myosurus australis F.Muell.

Species of flowering plant

Ranunculus oz is a species of flowering plant in the family Ranunculaceae, native to all of Australia except the Northern Territory. Its specific epithet is a colloquialism for Australia.
