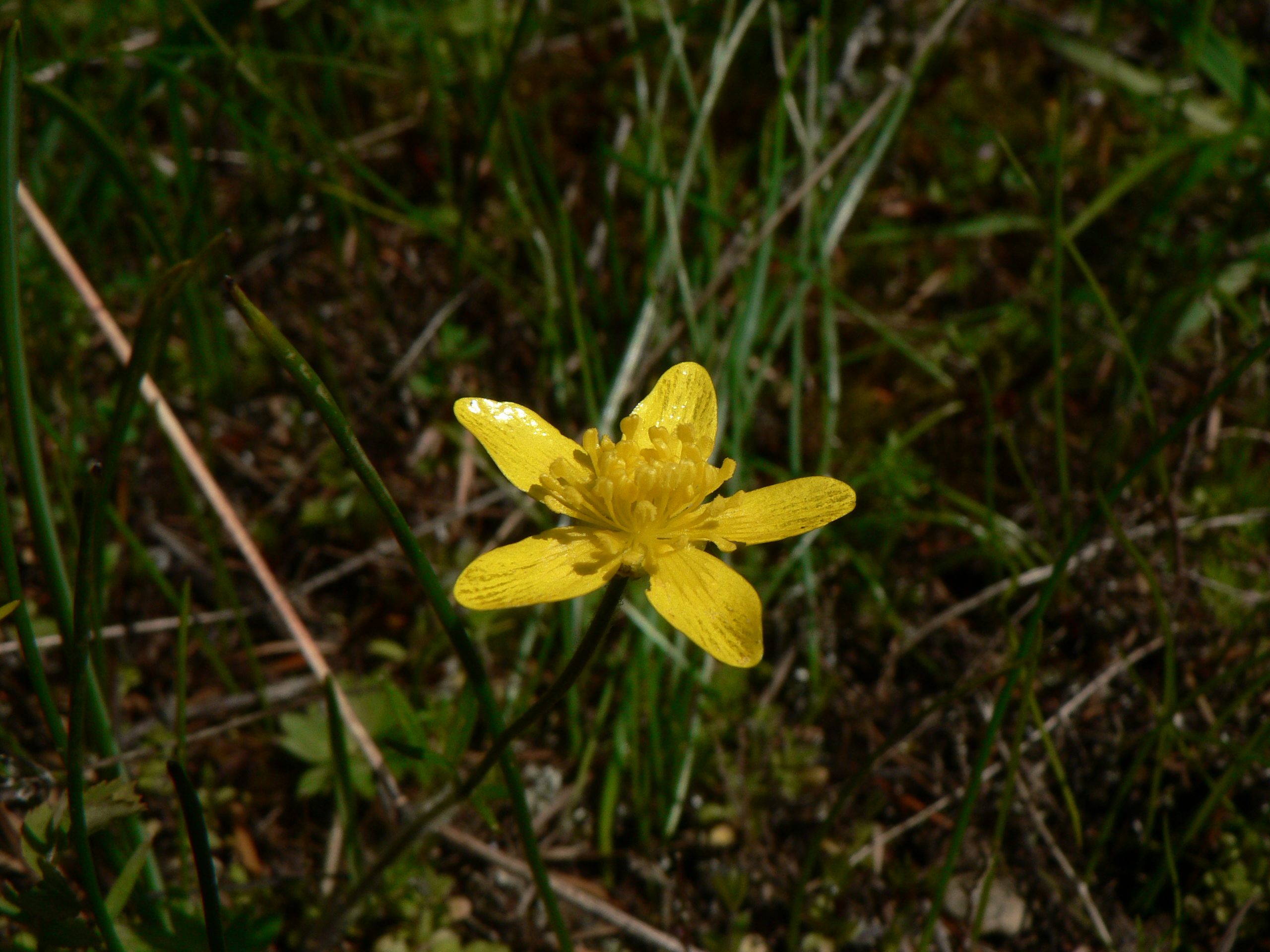
- R. occidentalis in Anacortes, Washington

Scientific classification
- Kingdom: Plantae
- Clade: Embryophytes
- Clade: Tracheophytes
- Clade: Spermatophytes
- Clade: Angiosperms
- Clade: Eudicots
- Order: Ranunculales
- Family: Ranunculaceae
- Genus: Ranunculus
- Species: R. occidentalis

Binomial name
- Ranunculus occidentalis Nutt.

= Ranunculus occidentalis =

Species of plant

Ranunculus occidentalis, the western buttercup, is a species of buttercup found in the western regions of North America. Its distribution extends from Alaska through British Columbia and Alberta to central California. The flower can be seen in open meadows, forests, and other generally flat areas up to an elevation of 2,200 metres (7,200 ft).

Aleut first nations may have used juice from the plant as a poison, its toxicity arising from the substance protoanemonin. Shasta first nations coincided blooming Ranunculus occidentalis with salmon runs in the summer. The seeds were used to make pinole, a staple food.

This plant is similar to, and sometimes difficult to distinguish from, the California buttercup (Ranunculus californicus).
