= Thalictrum glaucum =

Thalictrum glaucum can refer to:

- Thalictrum glaucum Schrad., a synonym of Thalictrum pubescens Pursh
- Thalictrum glaucum Desf., a synonym of Thalictrum speciosissimum Loefl. subsp. speciosissimum
