= Ethmia discrepitella =

Scientific classification
- Domain: Eukaryota
- Kingdom: Animalia
- Phylum: Arthropoda
- Class: Insecta
- Order: Lepidoptera
- Family: Depressariidae
- Genus: Ethmia
- Species: E. discrepitella

Binomial name
- Ethmia discrepitella (Rebel, 1901)

Synonyms
- Psecadia discrepitella Rebel, 1901

Species of moth

Ethmia discrepitella is a moth in the family Depressariidae. It is found in Russia (Orenburg Region, Altai and Saratov Region).

The species exhibits distinct sexual dimorphism. The wingspan for the males however, is 7.3–8.5 mm (0.29–0.33 in).

The larvae possibly feed on Thalictrum minus.
