= Thalictrum heliophilum =

Conservation status
- Imperiled (NatureServe)

Scientific classification
- Kingdom: Plantae
- Clade: Tracheophytes
- Clade: Angiosperms
- Clade: Eudicots
- Order: Ranunculales
- Family: Ranunculaceae
- Genus: Thalictrum
- Species: T. heliophilum

Binomial name
- Thalictrum heliophilum Wilken & DeMott

Species of flowering plant

Thalictrum heliophilum is a species of flowering plant in the buttercup family known by the common names Cathedral Bluff meadow-rue and sun-loving meadow-rue. It is endemic to Colorado in the United States, where it is known from three counties.

This perennial herb grows from rhizomes and fibrous roots. It produces one to three stems up to half a meter tall. The leaves are divided into leathery, waxy-textured leaflets each tipped with three teeth. The species is dioecious. The terminal inflorescence is a panicle of many flowers. The flower has four tiny sepals and no petals. The fruit is an achene. This species can be distinguished from the common Thalictrum fendleri by the size and texture of its leaflets and smaller number of achenes.

This species is native to the Piceance Basin of Colorado. It grows on hot, dry talus slopes originating from the Green River Formation, a geological formation. It is unusual in a genus of plants that generally grow in moist habitats. There are few other plants in its arid habitat but other species may include Astragalus lutosus, Mentzelia argillosa, and Festuca dasyclada.

There are 18 occurrences of this plant for an estimated total of less than 200,000 individuals. Threats to the species include oil and gas development, as there is active petroleum exploration in the Piceance Basin. Other threats include introduced species of plants and grazing and trampling by wild animals.
