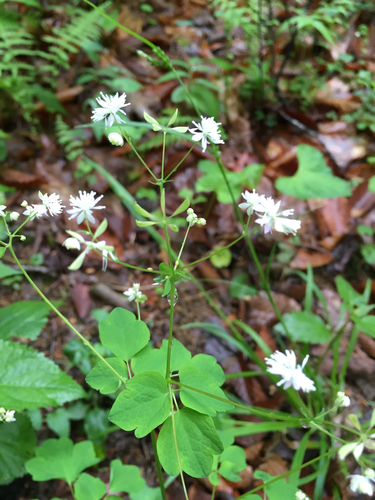

Conservation status
- Apparently Secure (NatureServe)

Scientific classification
- Kingdom: Plantae
- Clade: Tracheophytes
- Clade: Angiosperms
- Clade: Eudicots
- Order: Ranunculales
- Family: Ranunculaceae
- Genus: Thalictrum
- Species: T. clavatum

Binomial name
- Thalictrum clavatum DC.

= Thalictrum clavatum =

Species of flowering plant

Thalictrum clavatum DC., known by its common name as the Mountain Meadow-Rue or Lady Rue, is a slender perennial forb of the Ranunculaceae family native to the South and Central Appalachian regions of the United States, namely the states of Virginia, Kentucky, Tennessee, and parts of North Carolina and West Virginia. This dicotyledon species is commonly found within seepages, moist forests, spray cliffs at waterfalls, and brookbanks in mountainous regions at elevations of 500 meters. It is distinctive due to its green-hued, roughly 1.5 foot-tall form and its panicle inflorescence arrangement of white flowers that bloom within the months of May to July.

== Distribution and habitat ==
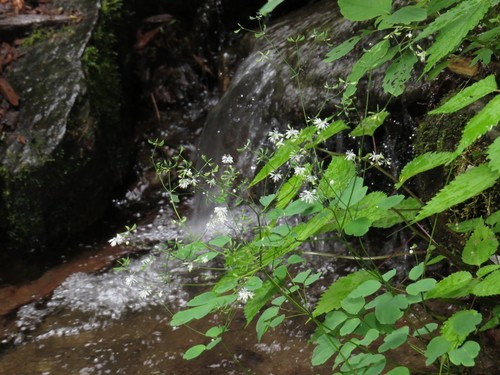
Thalictrum clavatum in Hen Wallow Fall, Great Smoky Mountains National Park, North Carolina, United States of America (June 2018).

Thalictrum clavatum is endemic to the South and Central Appalachian regions of the United States, namely the states of Virginia, West Virginia, North Carolina, South Carolina, Georgia, Kentucky, Tennessee, and Alabama. While it is abundant in the mountainous regions of Appalachia, it has also been sparingly reported in Western Piedmont Foothill regions at low elevations. Thalictrum clavatum is characteristically found in dense forests nearby cold water sources, namely wooded seepages, streamsides, spray cliffs at waterfalls, and brookbanks. While the plant species is commonly observed in groves, stands, leaks, screes, and outcrops, among other wooded and riparian environments, in less frequent instances, it has been reported in rich cove forests. Thalictrum clavatum can be observed at elevations ranging between 0 – 700 feet; however, it is most often found at elevations of 500 feet.

Thalictrum clavatum is labeled as L48 N within the Natural Resource Conservation Services sector of the United States Department of Agriculture, signifying that it is a native species of the continental United States.

Thalictrum clavatum has a heliophily value of three. The Heliophyte Index measures the degree to which a species requires sunlight for growth and reproductive success. A score of three indicates an adaptation or leniency towards shaded environments.

Thalictrum clavatum is categorized as a Facultative Wetland (FACW) species under the National Wetland Plant List, signifying that the plant is likely present within wetland environments. The species functions as an indicator of wetland biomes, particularly within the Eastern Mountains and Piedmont regions, as well as areas in the Atlantic and Gulf Coastal Plains.

== Phenology and blooming ==
Thalictrum clavatum is most apparent from the beginning of April to the middle of July; however, there have been earlier recorded spottings of the plant within the start of August. The species blooms a white color within the spring and summer months between May and July, after the spring wildflowers of the rich cove forest have already blossomed. After flowering, Thalictrum clavatum produces an achene fruit.

== Taxonomy and classification ==
The Thalictrum clavatum species belongs to the Ranunculaceae family, commonly recognized as the Buttercup Family. Within this classification, the species belongs to the Thalictrum, or Meadow-Rue, genus.

Within the Natural Resource Conservation Services sector of the United States Department of Agriculture, the Thalictrum clavatum species is recognized as THCL.

Within vernacular settings, the Thalictrum clavatum species is colloquially referred to as the Lady Rue or the Mountain Meadow-rue. However, within scientific literature, the Thalictrum clavatum name is synonymous with Thalictrum filipes and Thalictrum nudicaule.

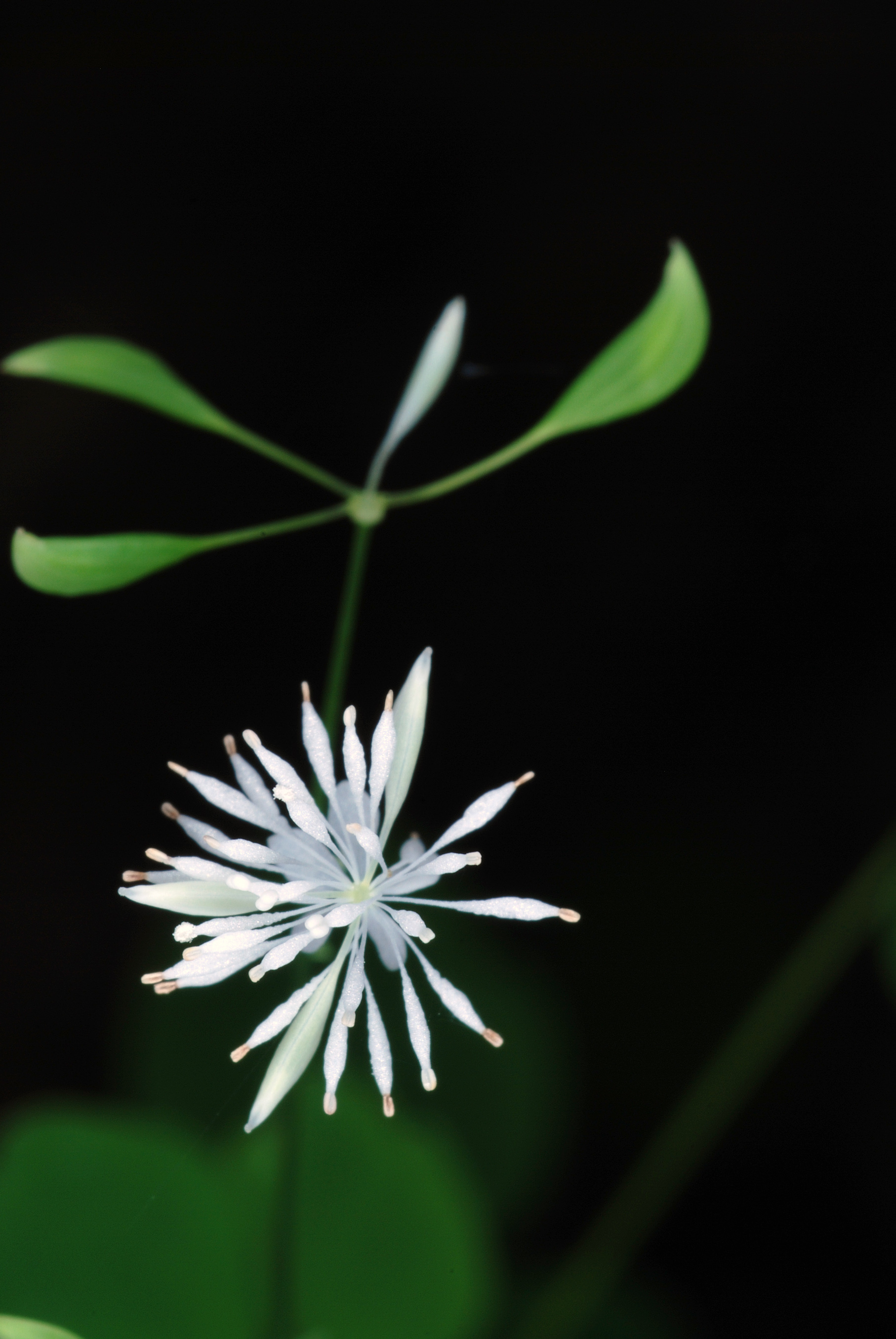
Thalictrum clavatum in Rabun Bald Trail, Rabun County, Georgia, United States of America (June 18, 2011)

Thalictrum clavatum is categorized under the International Code of Nomenclature for Algae, Fungi, and Plants produced by Swiss botanist Augustin Pyramus de Candolle. Given that de Candolle was the first individual to publish a description of the species, the formal name of the plant bears his initials: Thalictrum clavatum DC. De Candolle first reported the species within the publication Théorie élementarire de la botanique (Elementary Theory of Botany, 1817)".

The genus name Thalictrum derives from the ancient Greek term "thaliktron". The term was first used by botanist Dioscorides in the first century CE to denote plants with finely divided leaf structures. The name clavatum derives from the neuter form of the Latin adjective "clavatus", meaning club-shaped.

=== Genus ===
The Thalictrum genus, common name Meadow-Rue, is composed of approximately 330 species of perennial herbaceous flowering plants belonging to the Ranunculus family. Individuals within the genus generally reside in shaded, damp environments within temperate zones throughout the Northern Hemisphere, southern regions of Africa, and select areas of South America. The genus is identified by its alternate leaves, which consist of three ternately to pinnately compound leaflets, light-colored stamen, and absent petals. Differentiation within the genus is taxonomically challenging due to poor understanding of species boundaries. The genus is generally pollinated by methods of anemophily and entomophilous. The genus is commonly subjected to herbivory by the larvae of Lepidoptera order insects, namely the Setaceous Hebrew Moth. Individuals of the genus commonly produce metabolites, such as alkaloids, triterpenoids, triterpenoid glycosides, flavonoids, cyanogenic glycosides, hydrocarbons, and sterols, in addition to a variety of natural products, including benzylisoquinoline alkaloids and the alkaloid berberine.

== Morphology ==
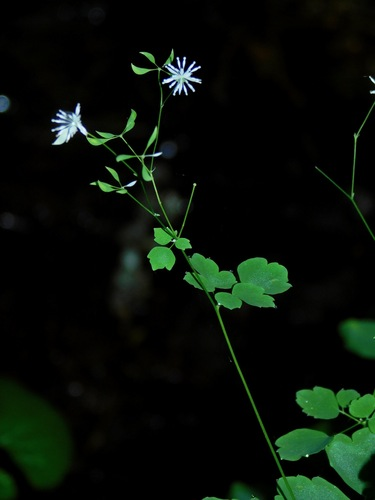
Thalictrum clavatum in Appalachian National Scenic Trail, North Carolina, United States of America (July 2022)

=== Inflorescence and flower description ===
While the flowers of Thalictrum clavatum are devoid of petals, it features on average four to five white obovate-spatulate sepals (2.5 - 4.0 mm). The sepals are caducous, signifying that they detach from the plant upon flowering. The flower is cosexual, given the presence of both male and female reproductive organs. The male reproductive system consists of numerous petaloid, flatten-shaped white filaments (2.5 - 4.0 mm) and anthers (0.3 - 0.5 mm), while the female reproductive system consists of a superior ovary and several white-hued stigma. The plant contains basal, marginal placentation. While the arrangement of each flower is individually radially symmetrical or actinomorphic, the total inflorescence is a panicle or nearly corymbs. Each individual flower is arranged in a pom-pom formation, measuring roughly 1/3 inch wide. The pedicle of the species is slender in form with few to no leaves.

=== Leaf and leaflet description ===
The proximal cauline leaves towards the base of Thalictrum clavatum are petiolate, with each leaf having two or three layers of compoundness. The distal cauline leaves, however, are sessile, with each having a singular or two layers of compoundness. Both the proximal and distal leaves of the plant are bi-ternately compound. The leaves of the plant are arranged in an alternate configuration. The leaflets of the plant are obovate in shape with an apically lobed tip. Each leaflet is roughly 10 – 30 mm in width. The individual leaflets do not contain a fragrance. The undersurface of the leaflets is glaucous, or waxy. The leaf durations are deciduous. The leaf type is broadleaf and contains ternate venation, with crenate edges.

=== Root description ===
The roots of Thalictrum clavatum are few, black in coloration, and slightly tuberous.

=== Fruit description ===
The fruit type of Thalictrum clavatum is achene, a dry one-seeded fruit that does not unfurl when ripe. There are usually three to eight achene fruits within the plant, arranged in a spreading formation. Each achene has an elongated stipe, or stalk (1.0 - 3.0 mm). The shape of the achene fruit is flat and sickled, with veining along the sides.

=== Stem description ===
The stem of Thalictrum clavatum is slender and smooth. The green-hued erect stem stands roughly 15 to 60 cm in height. The stem is glabrous, or devoid of hairs.

== Reproductive strategies ==
Thalictrum clavatum reproduces through insect-mediated pollination, namely by Syrphid Hoverflies of the genus Sphegina. The plant species contains upward-facing flowers with extended stamens to promote insect-mediated pollination. However, due to an inability to produce nectar, the species is unable to readily attract insect pollinators, and as such incurs low rates of reproductive success through this process. Conversely, the plant species is reproductively successful through other pollination methods, namely anemophily and autogamy. While autogamy ensures reproductive success, through this process, the species suffers a decline in genetic diversity. This consequence of autogamy alludes to the species's specialist role and inability to inhabit a varied range of environmental conditions. The light average weight of its seeds (6.6 mg), high pollen to ovule ratio (4,000:1), and large number of seeds produced relative to its biomass ensure reproductive success of the plant species through wind-mediated pollination. While pollen grains for the species vary widely, they are generally 28.5 μm in diameter and exhibit a uniform membrane. Due to the species's proximity to rivers and streams, a small number of successful reproduction events are attributed to seed dispersal by water. Thalictrum clavatum is often dioecious, with individuals among the population having exclusively female or other male reproductive systems.

== Conservation ==
Thalictrum clavatum has a global value of G4, signifying the species's uncommon status and indicating a slight concern for population decline. The value is calculated by NatureServe and denotes the relative global rarity of individual plant species. Under the North Carolina Natural Heritage Program (NCNHP), Thalictrum clavatum is labeled S4. This value correlates to a low risk of extirpation due to extensive geographical range and population density, but a slight concern for decline due to recent local reductions.

Thalictrum clavatum has a Coefficient of Conservatism (C-value) of 10, denoting that the plant largely inhabits undisturbed, natural environments and has a low tolerance for habitat degradation. Given this, Thalictrum clavatum is scarcely observed in human-impacted environments.

== Displays ==
Thalictrum clavatum is displayed within the gardens of the Mount Cuba Center in Hockessin, Delaware, a botanic center committed to the conservation of native plants and their habitats.
