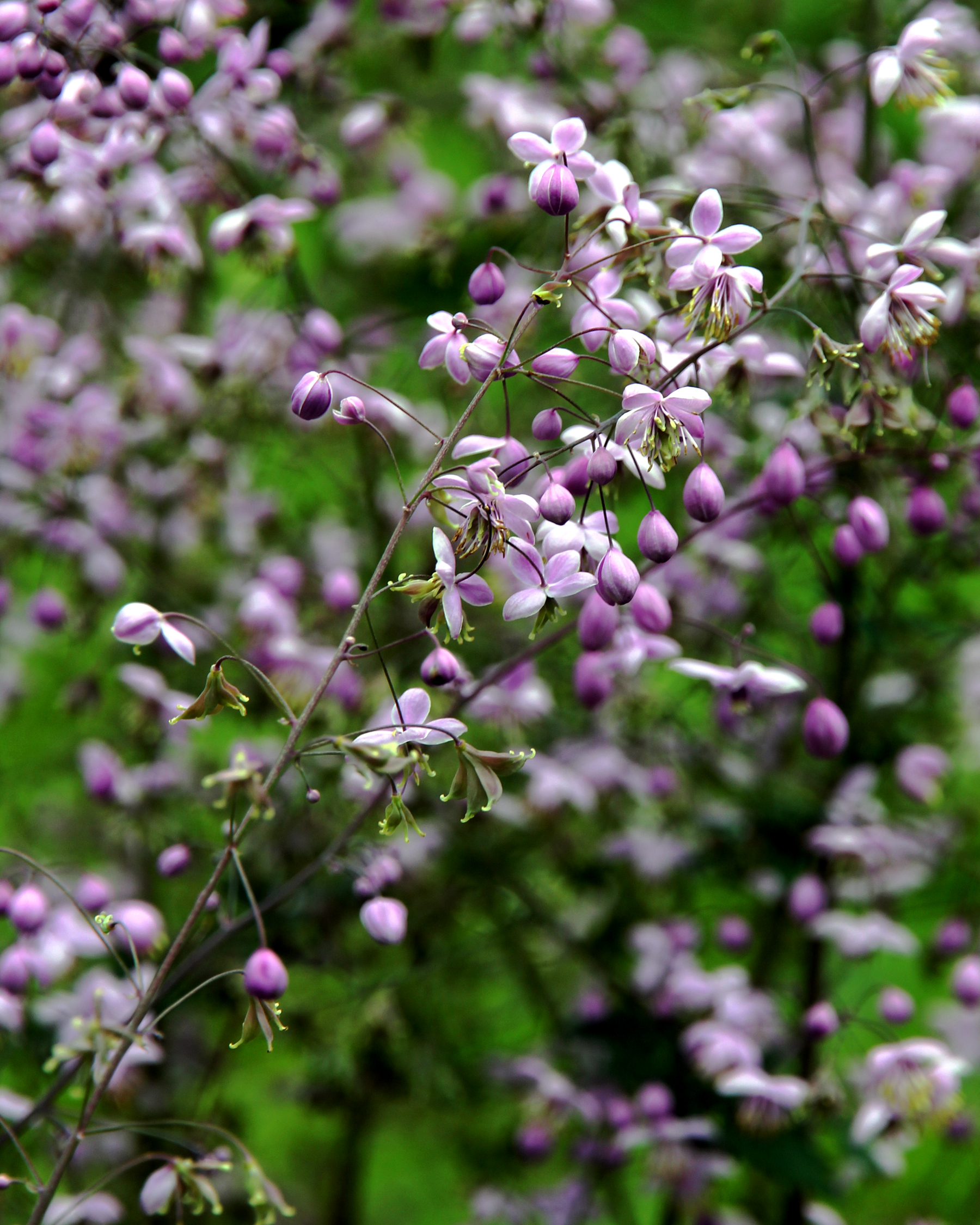

Scientific classification
- Kingdom: Plantae
- Clade: Tracheophytes
- Clade: Angiosperms
- Clade: Eudicots
- Order: Ranunculales
- Family: Ranunculaceae
- Genus: Thalictrum
- Species: T. delavayi

Binomial name
- Thalictrum delavayi Franch.

Synonyms
- List: Thalictrum dipterocarpum Franch.; Thalictrum duclouxii H.Lév.; Thalictrum grandisepalum H.Lév.

= Thalictrum delavayi =

Species of flowering plant

Thalictrum delavayi, Chinese meadow-rue, is a species of flowering plant in the family Ranunculaceae native to China. Growing to 1.2 m (4 ft) tall by 60 cm (24 in) wide, it is a herbaceous perennial with leaves divided into many small leaflets, and panicles of lilac flowers with green or white stamens in summer.

The specific epithet delavayi honours the 19th century French explorer and botanist Père Jean Marie Delavay.

The cultivar 'Ankum' has gained the Royal Horticultural Society's Award of Garden Merit.

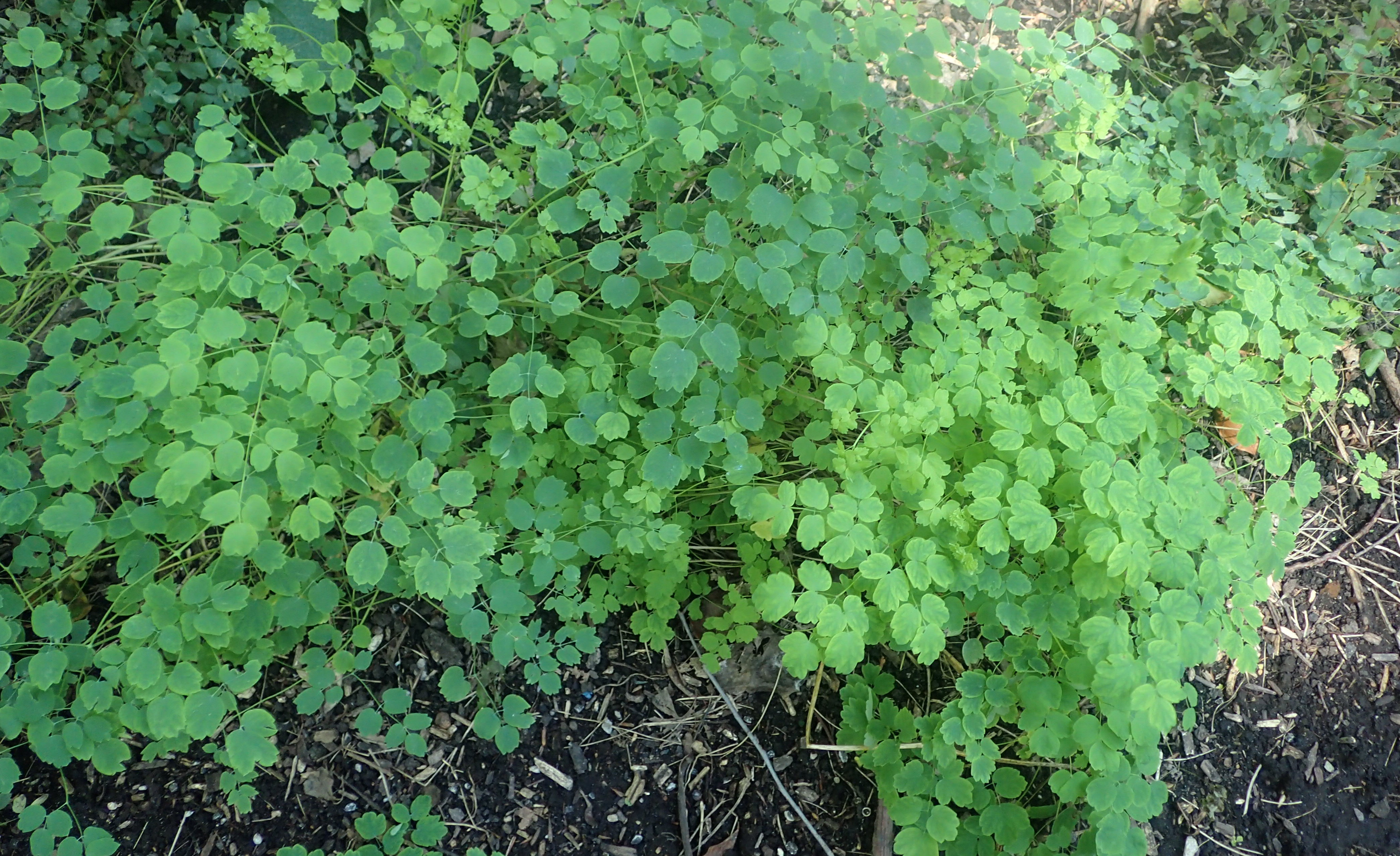

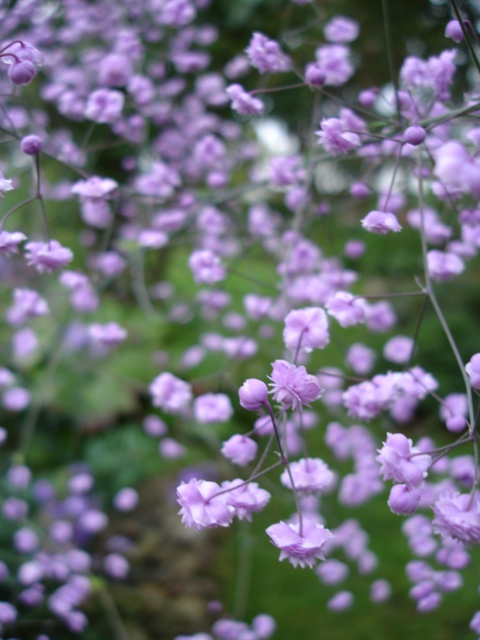
’Hewitt’s Double’
