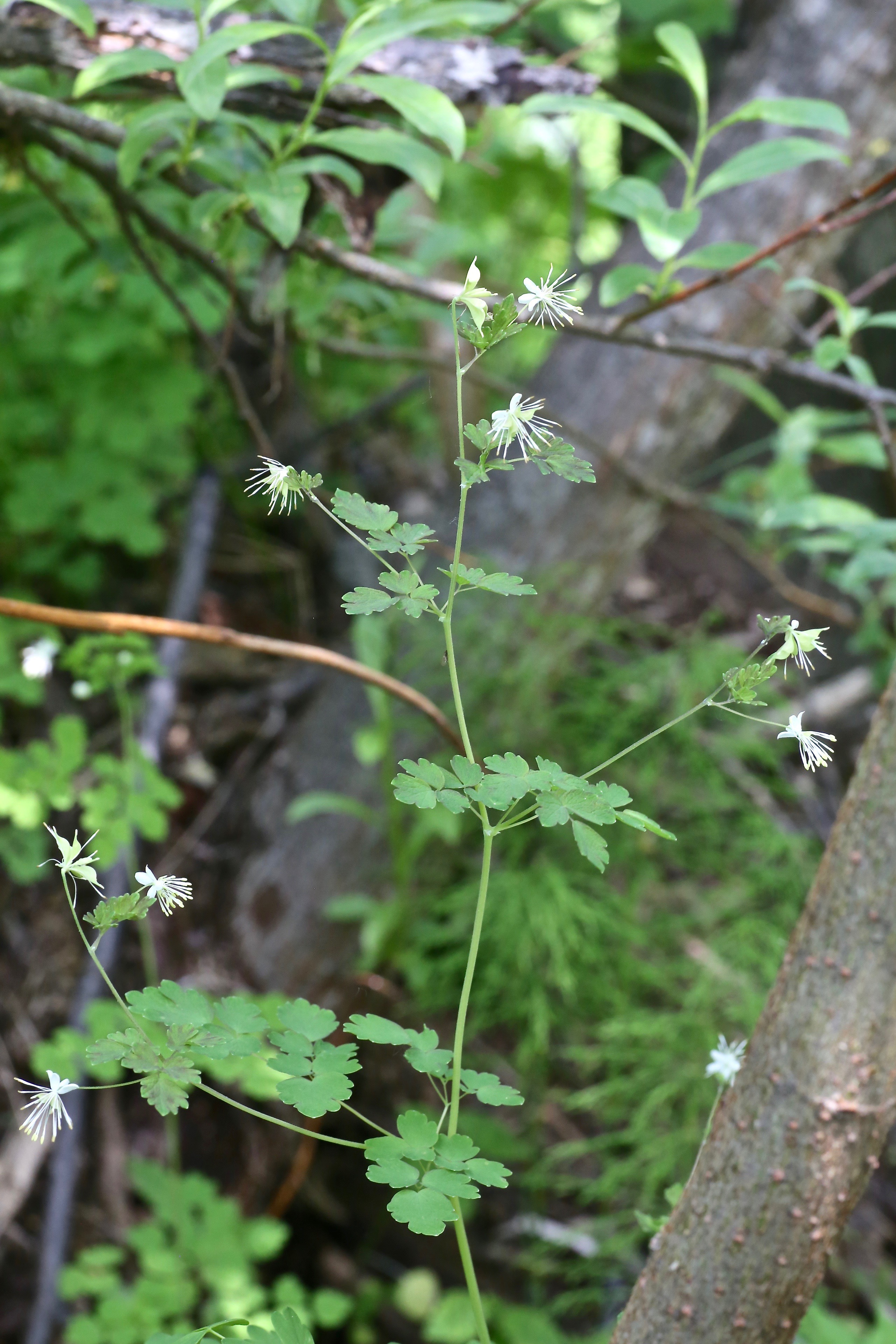
- Thalictrum sparsiflorum - Amut lake. Solnechny District in Khabarovsk Krai, The Russian Far East

Scientific classification
- Kingdom: Plantae
- Clade: Tracheophytes
- Clade: Angiosperms
- Clade: Eudicots
- Order: Ranunculales
- Family: Ranunculaceae
- Genus: Thalictrum
- Species: T. sparsiflorum

Binomial name
- Thalictrum sparsiflorum Turcz. ex Fisch. & C.A.Mey.

= Thalictrum sparsiflorum =

Species of flowering plant

Thalictrum sparsiflorum is a species of flowering plant in the buttercup family known by the common name fewflower meadow-rue. It is native to northwestern North America and parts of northeastern Asia. It grows in moist habitat, such as streambanks and forest understory. It is a perennial herb producing erect stems up to about a meter in maximum height. The leaves have compound blades divided into a few or many segments which are borne on long, slender petioles. The blades are usually finely hairy and glandular. The inflorescence is a leafy panicle of flowers. Unlike some other Thalictrum species which are dioecious, this species has bisexual flowers. Each has a calyx of five greenish sepals, and up to 20 light-colored dangling stamens tipped with large anthers. The flowers develop into compressed, beaked fruits.

Unlike some Thalictrum species, it is pollinated by insects rather than wind.
