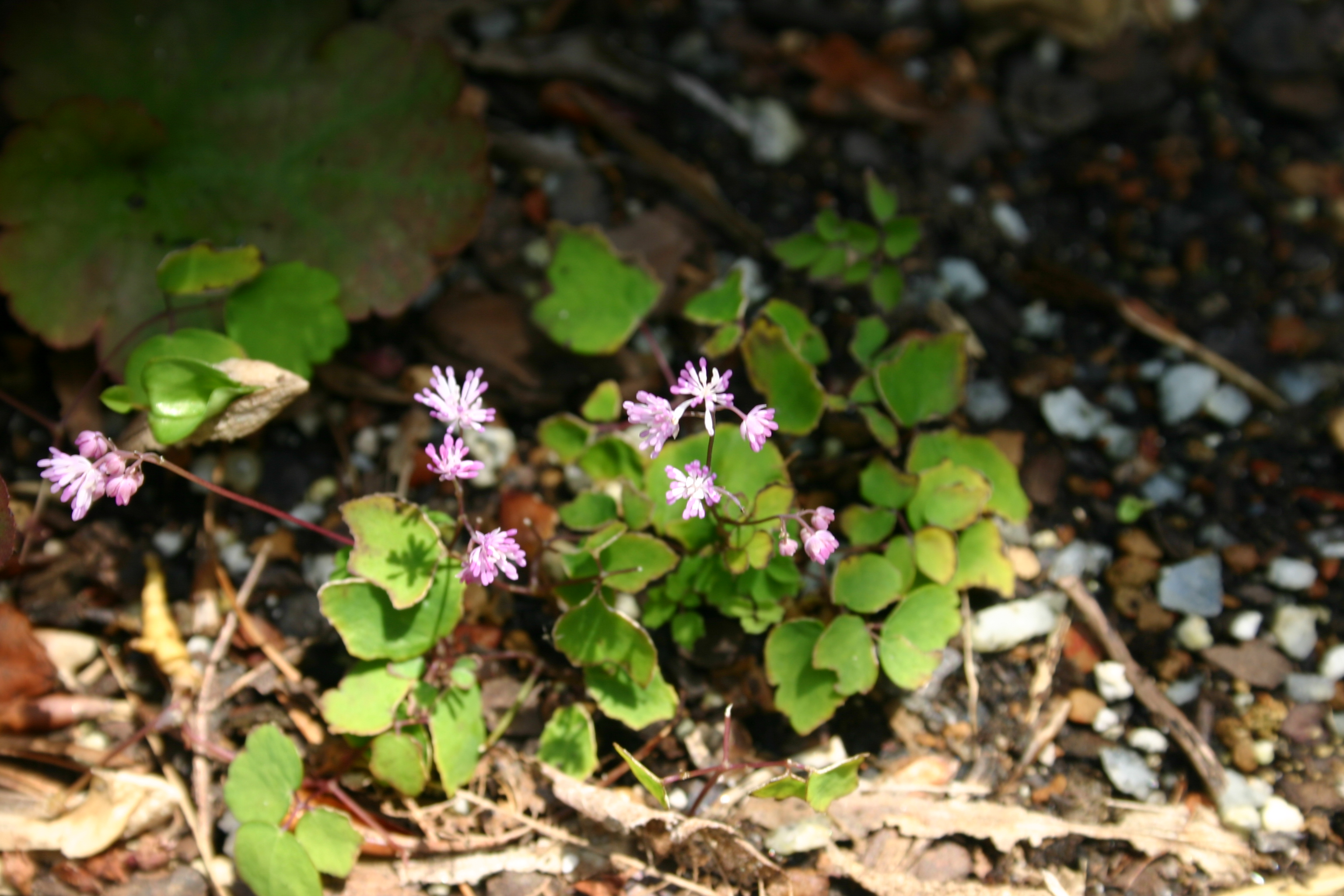

Scientific classification
- Kingdom: Plantae
- Clade: Embryophytes
- Clade: Tracheophytes
- Clade: Angiosperms
- Clade: Eudicots
- Order: Ranunculales
- Family: Ranunculaceae
- Genus: Thalictrum
- Species: T. kiusianum

Binomial name
- Thalictrum kiusianum Nakai

= Thalictrum kiusianum =

Species of flowering plant

Thalictrum kiusianum, the Kyushu meadow-rue or dwarf meadow-rue, is a herbaceous perennial grown for its compact slowly spreading habit, forming a mat of dark green, with showy purplish-pink flowers.
