= Thalictrum revolutum =

Scientific classification
- Kingdom: Plantae
- Clade: Tracheophytes
- Clade: Angiosperms
- Clade: Eudicots
- Order: Ranunculales
- Family: Ranunculaceae
- Genus: Thalictrum
- Species: T. revolutum

Binomial name
- Thalictrum revolutum DC.

Species of flowering plant

Thalictrum revolutum, commonly known as waxy meadow-rue, is a species of flowering plant in Ranunculaceae. It is native to eastern North America. It inhabits anthropogenic habitats, forests, meadows, fields, ridges or ledges and woodlands.

== Description ==
Thalictrum revolutum is a perennial that can grow 3-7' tall. The central stem is green or reddish-purple, usually glaucus but can be slightly pubescent. The alternate leaves are ternately compound. The primary compound leaves are pinnately compound. The leaflets are rounded at the base and are either unlobed or with two to three lobes toward the outer edges. The margins of each leaflet are slightly curved downward. The underside of each leaflet is light green or white and is covered with hairs which give it a waxy appearance. When crushed, the foliage produces a skunk-like scent.
