= Hernandezine =

Chemical compound

Identifiers
CAS Number	6681-13-6
3D model (JSmol)	Interactive image
ChEBI	CHEBI:5677
ChemSpider	65282
KEGG	C09461
PubChem CID	72343
UNII	HPH24MXX7G
CompTox Dashboard (EPA)	DTXSID40216926
- InChI: InChI=1S/C39H44N2O7/c1-40-16-14-25-21-32(43-4)34-22-28(25)29(40)18-23-8-11-26(12-9-23)47-33-20-24(10-13-31(33)42-3)19-30-35-27(15-17-41(30)2)36(44-5)38(45-6)39(46-7)37(35)48-34/h8-13,20-22,29-30H,14-19H2,1-7H3/t29-,30-/m0/s1 Key: FUZMQNZACIFDBL-KYJUHHDHSA-N
- SMILES: CN1CCc2cc(c3cc2[C@@H]1Cc4ccc(cc4)Oc5cc(ccc5OC)C[C@H]6c7c(c(c(c(c7O3)OC)OC)OC)CCN6C)OC

Properties
Chemical formula	C_{39}H_{44}N_{2}O_{7}
Molar mass	652.788 g·mol^{−1}
- Except where otherwise noted, data are given for materials in their standard state (at 25 °C [77 °F], 100 kPa). Infobox references

Hernandezine is a tetrahydroquinoline alkaloid that has been isolated from Thalictrum.
