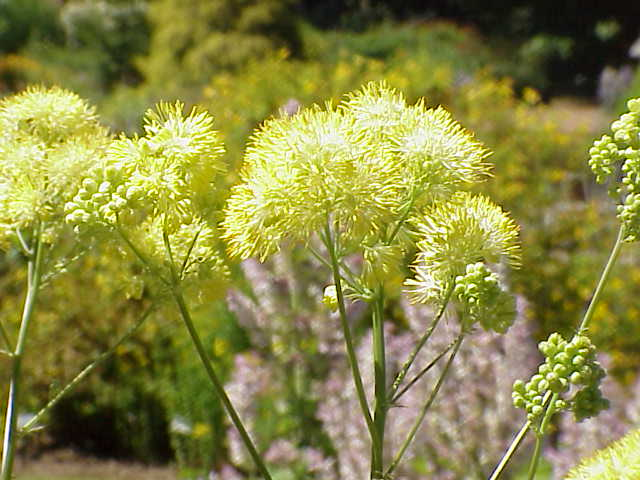
- Thalictrum flavum

Scientific classification
- Kingdom: Plantae
- Clade: Embryophytes
- Clade: Tracheophytes
- Clade: Spermatophytes
- Clade: Angiosperms
- Clade: Eudicots
- Order: Ranunculales
- Family: Ranunculaceae
- Subfamily: Thalictroideae
- Genus: Thalictrum; Tourn. ex L.

Species
- See text

= Thalictrum =

Genus of flowering plants in the buttercup family

Thalictrum ( /θəˈlɪktrəm/) is a genus of 120–200 species of herbaceous perennial flowering plants in the buttercup family, Ranunculaceae, native mostly to temperate regions. Meadow-rue is a common name for plants in this genus.

Thalictrum is a taxonomically difficult genus with poorly understood species boundaries; it is in need of further taxonomic and field research for clarification.

Despite their common name of "meadow-rue", Thalictrum species are not closely related to the true rue (family Rutaceae), but resemble its members in having compound leaves twice or thrice divided.

== Description ==
Meadow-rue leaves are alternate, bipinnately compound, and commonly glaucous blue-green in colour.

The flowers are small and apetalous (no petals), but have numerous long stamens, often brightly white, yellow, pink or pale purple, and are produced in conspicuous dense inflorescences. In some species (e.g. T. chelidonii, T. tuberosum), the sepals are large, brightly coloured and petal-like, but in most they are small and fall when the flower opens or soon after.

== Habitat and distribution ==
Meadow-rues are usually found in shaded or damp locations, with a sub-cosmopolitan range throughout most of the Northern Hemisphere and also south to southern Africa and tropical South America, but absent from Australasia. They are most common in temperate regions of the world; twenty-two species are found in North America.

== Ecology ==
Anemophily (wind pollination) is a characteristic of some members this genus, as seen in Thalictrum fendleri and Thalictrum dioicum. Others, such as Thalictrum sparsiflorum, are entomophilous (pollinated by insects).

Thalictrum species are used as food plants by the larvae of some Lepidoptera species including the Setaceous Hebrew character moth.

== Chemical constituents ==
In addition to alkaloids, Thalictrum species produce many other classes of metabolites, including triterpenoids and triterpenoid glycosides, flavonoids, cyanogenic glycosides, hydrocarbons, alcohols with high molecular weight, fatty acids, phenolic compounds and sterols. Typical natural products found in this genus are benzylisoquinoline alkaloids, such as magnoflorine, hernandezine, and the structurally related alkaloid berberine.

== Selected species ==
- Thalictrum alpinum – alpine meadow-rue
- Thalictrum aquilegiifolium – greater meadow-rue
- Thalictrum chelidonii
- Thalictrum cooleyi – Cooley's meadow-rue
- Thalictrum coreanum
- Thalictrum clavatum - mountain meadow-rue
- Thalictrum dasycarpum
- Thalictrum delavayi – Chinese meadow-rue
- Thalictrum dioicum – early meadow-rue
- Thalictrum fendleri – Fendler's meadow-rue
- Thalictrum filamentosum
- Thalictrum flavum – yellow or common meadow-rue
- Thalictrum grandiflorum
- Thalictrum hamatum
- Thalictrum heliophilum – cathedral meadow-rue
- Thalictrum integrilobum
- Thalictrum kiusianum – Kyushu meadow-rue, dwarf meadow-rue
- Thalictrum minus – lesser meadow-rue
- Thalictrum occidentale – western meadow-rue
- Thalictrum oligandrum
- Thalictrum przewalskii
- Thalictrum pubescens
- Thalictrum revolutum - waxyleaf meadow-rue
- Thalictrum robustum
- Thalictrum rochebruneanum – lavender mist meadow-rue
- Thalictrum sparsiflorum – fewflower meadow-rue
- Thalictrum speciosissimum
- Thalictrum thalictroides – rue-anemone (syn. Anemonella thalictroides)
- Thalictrum tuberosum
- Thalictrum tuberiferum
- Thalictrum uncatum
- Thalictrum urbainii

== Cultivation ==
Thalictrum species are valued as ornamental garden plants, with their sprays of flowers in delicate shades. The following cultivars, with mixed or unknown parents, have received the Royal Horticultural Society's Award of Garden Merit:

- 'Black Stockings'
- 'Elin'
- 'Splendide White' (Fr21034)
- 'Tukker Princess'

== Gallery ==
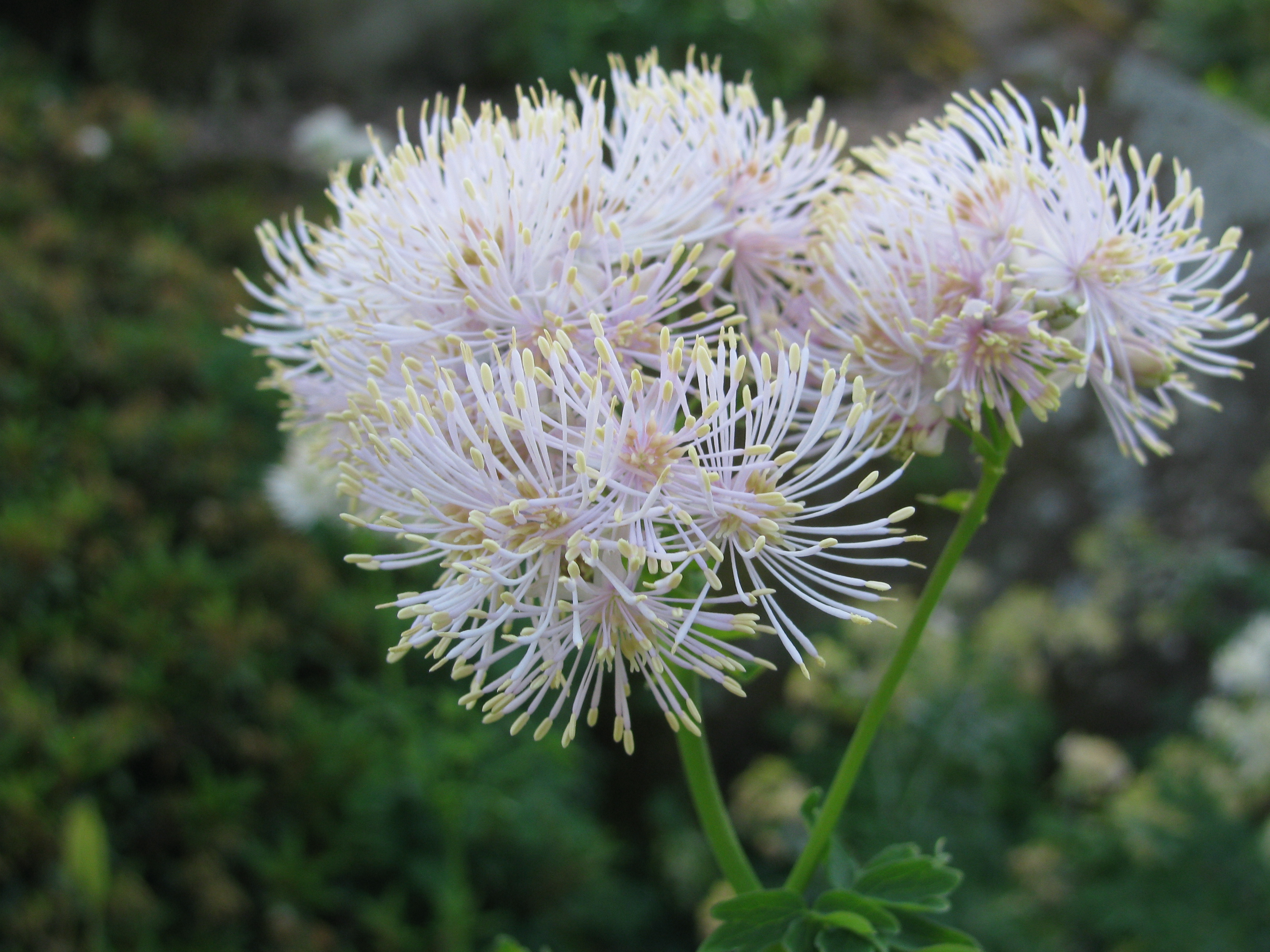
Thalictrum aquilegiifolium

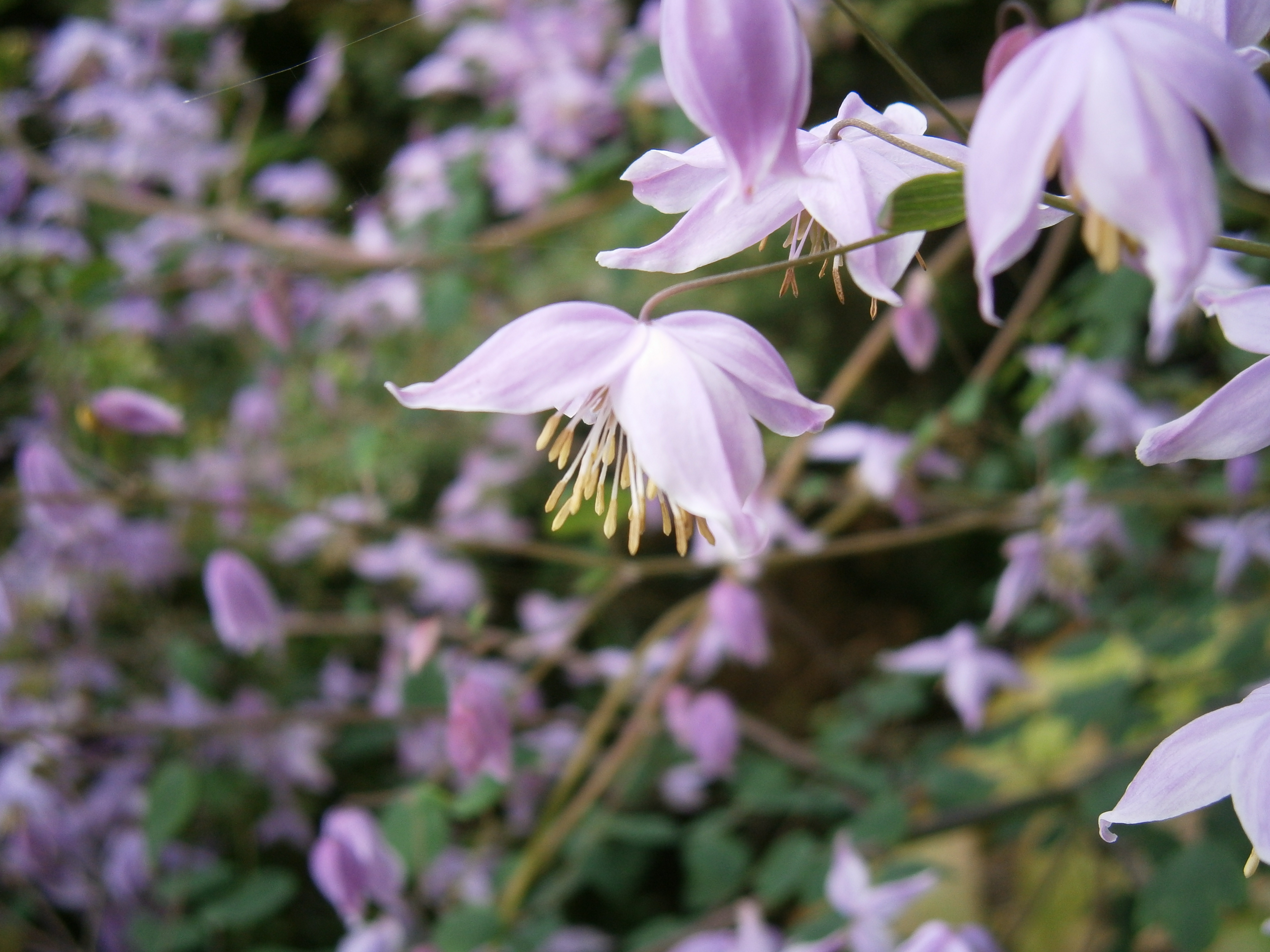
Thalictrum chelidonii

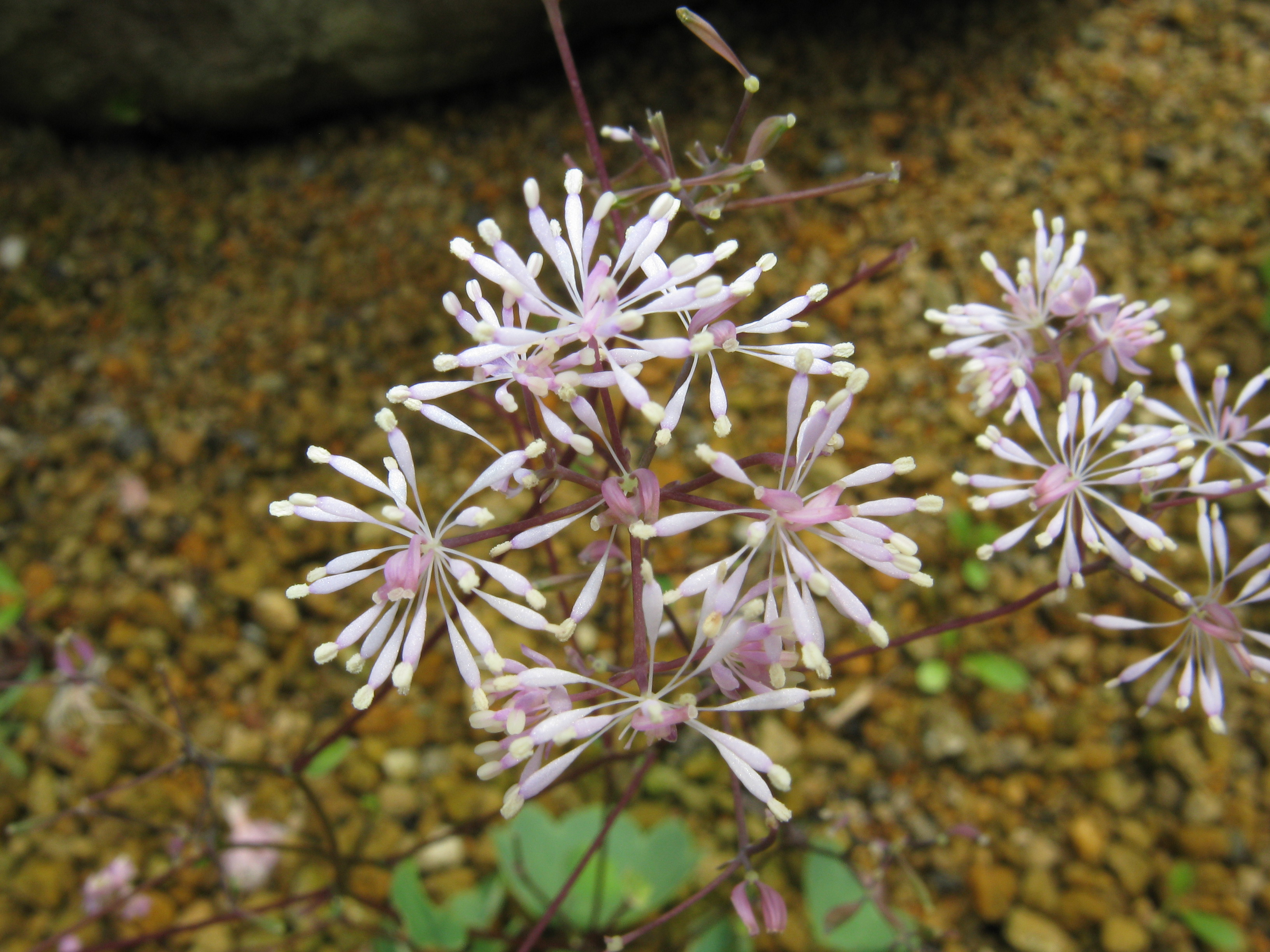
Thalictrum coreanum

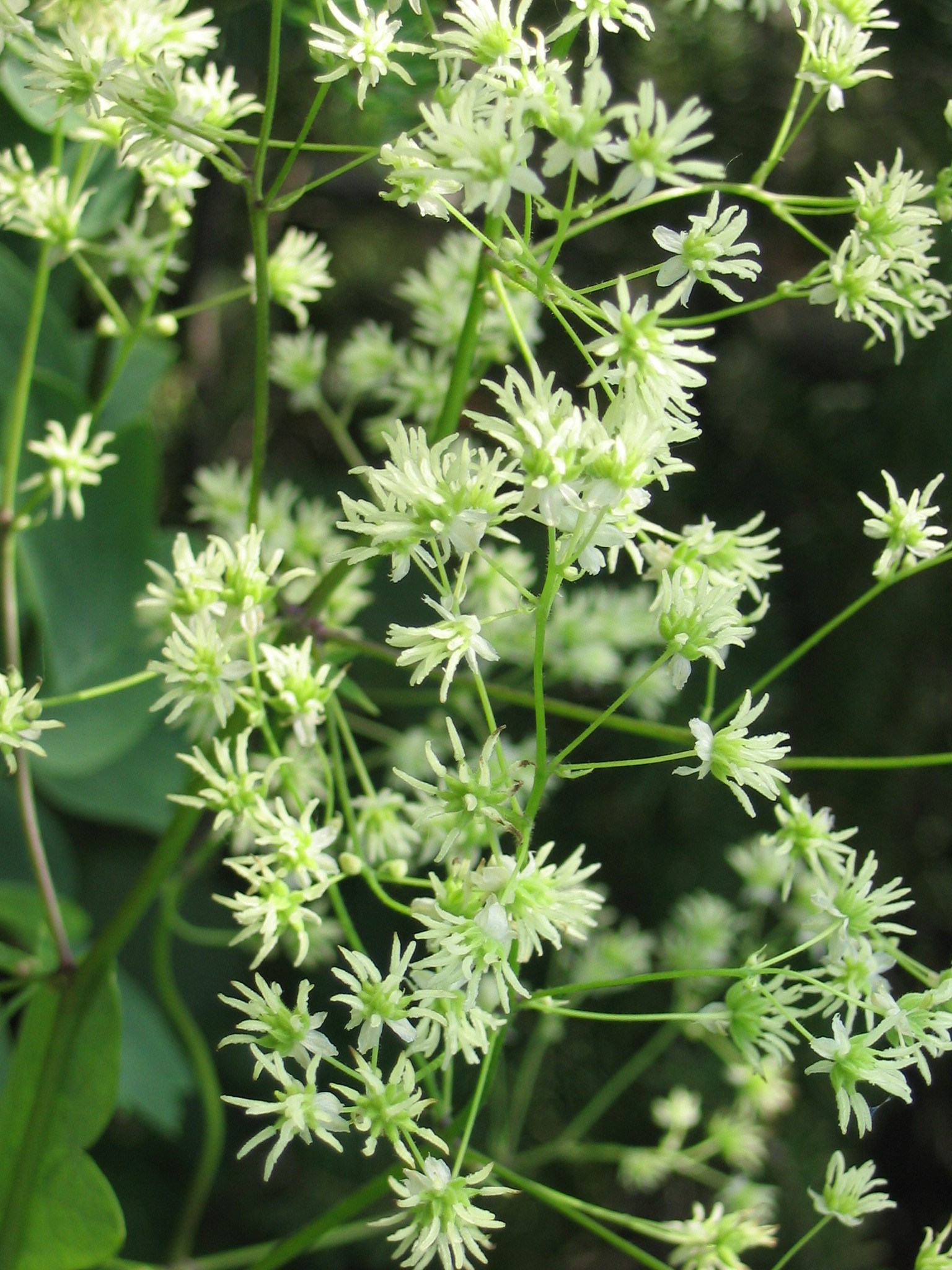
Thalictrum dasycarpum

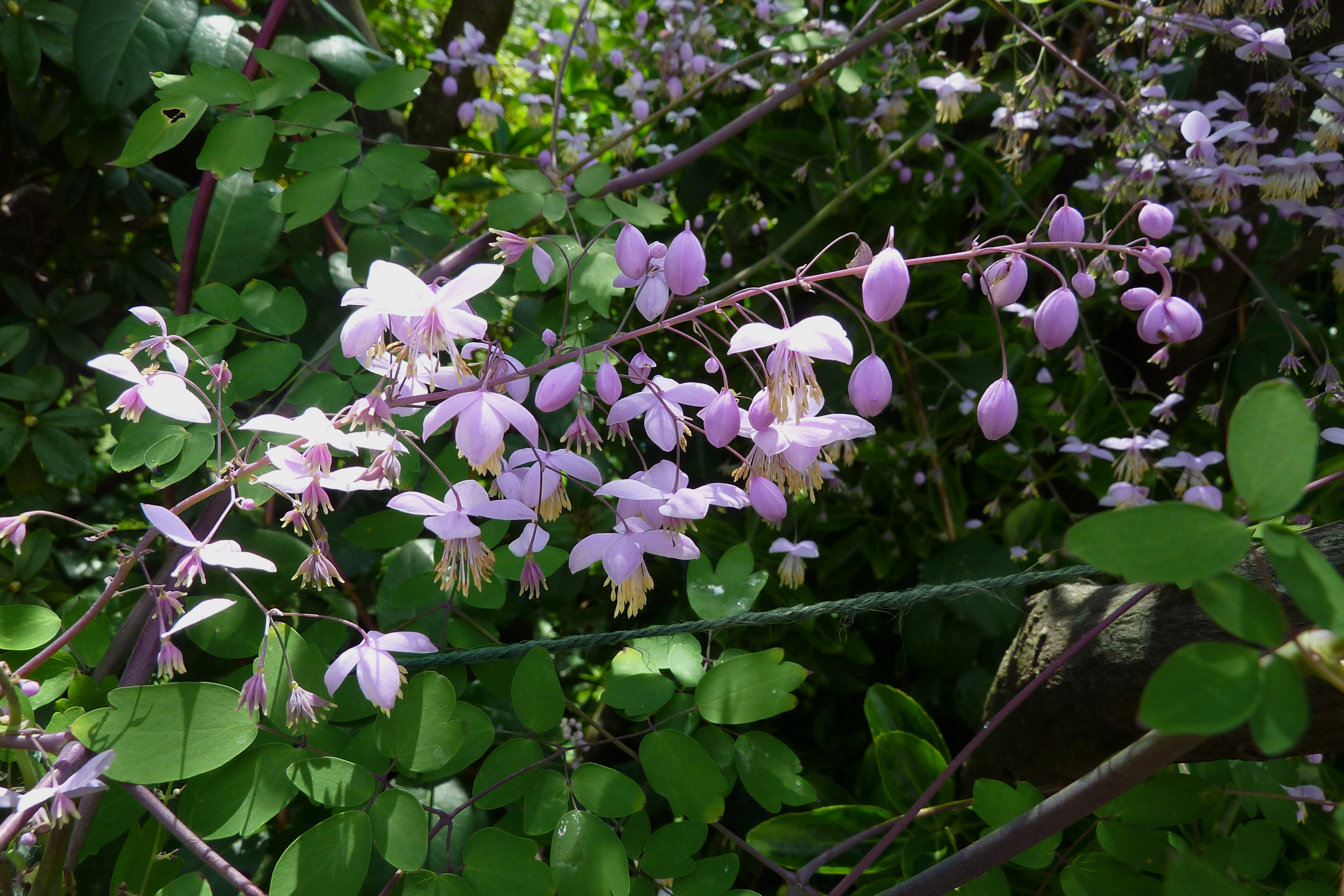
Thalictrum delavayi flowers

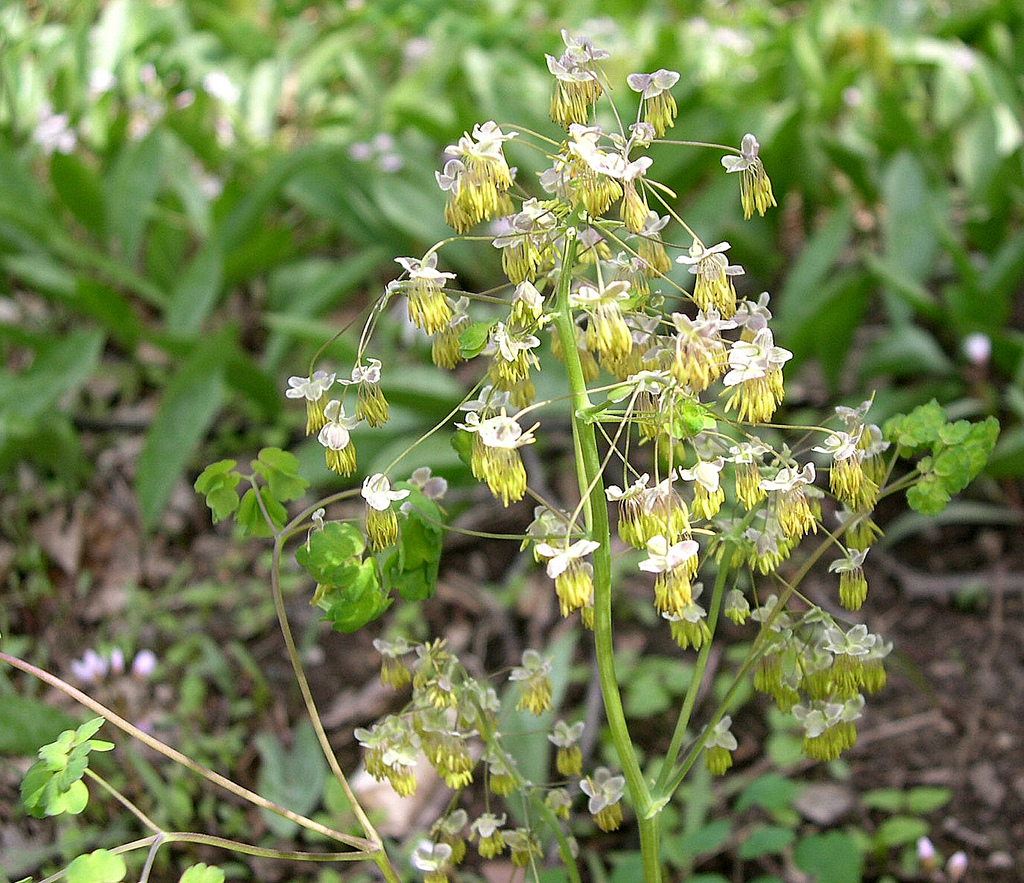
Early meadow-rue (Thalictrum dioicum)

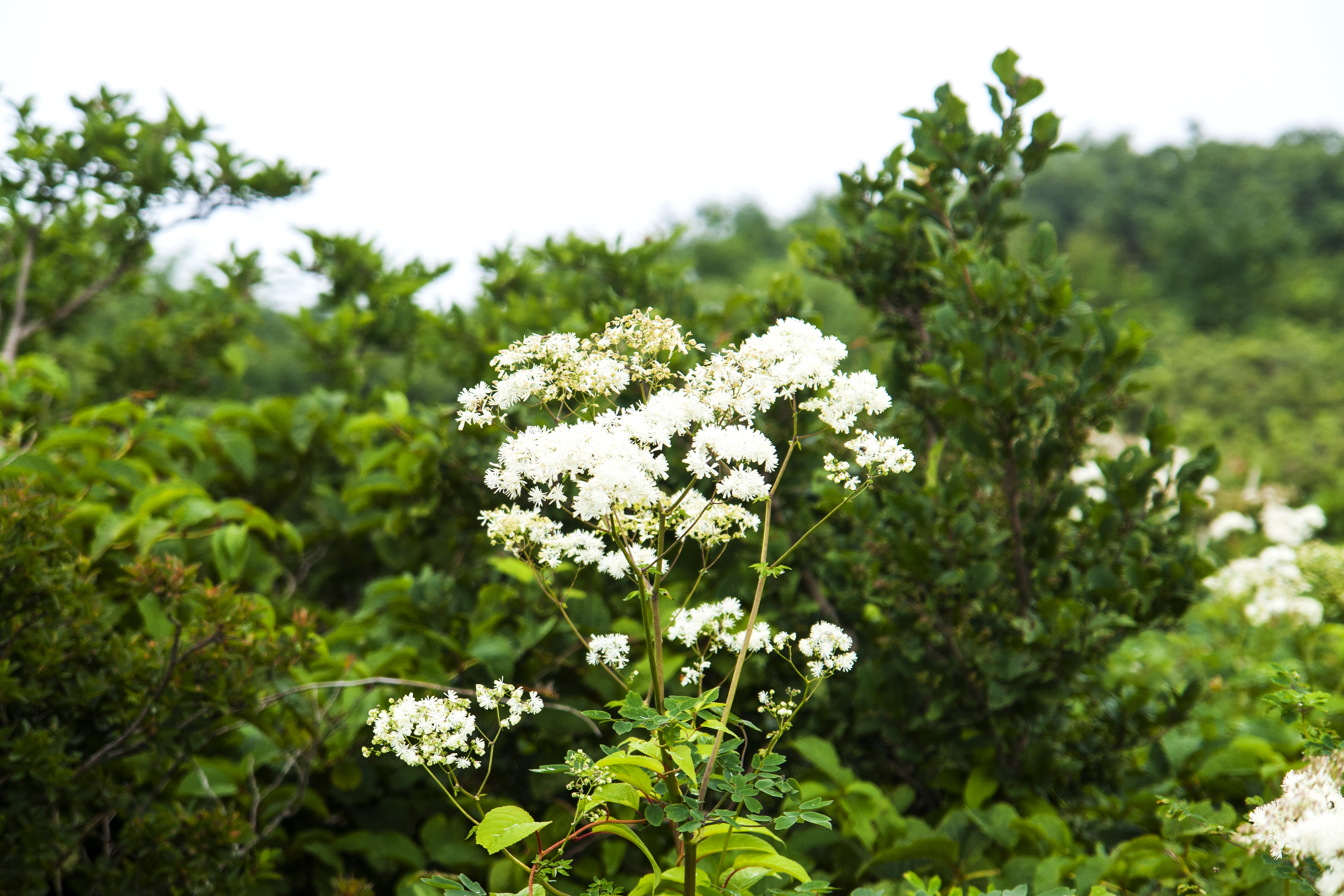
Thalictrum filamentosum

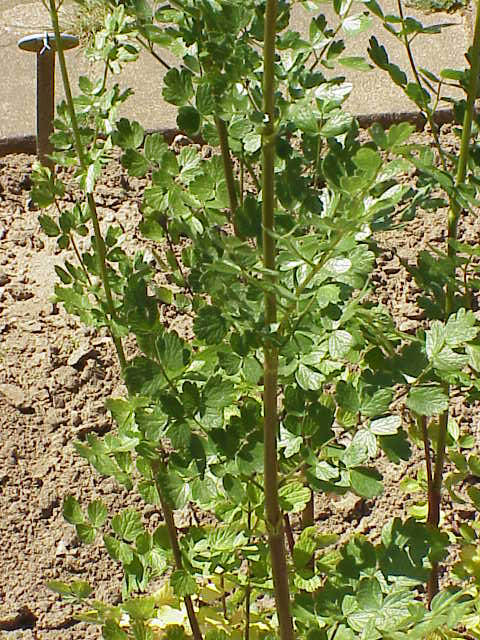
Thalictrum flavum leaves

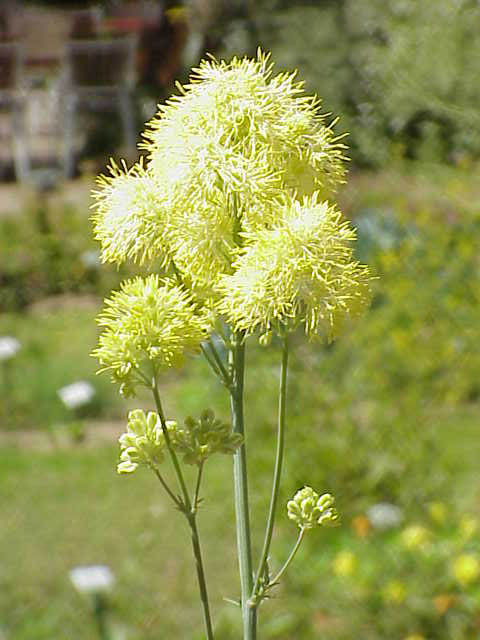
Thalictrum glaucum flowers

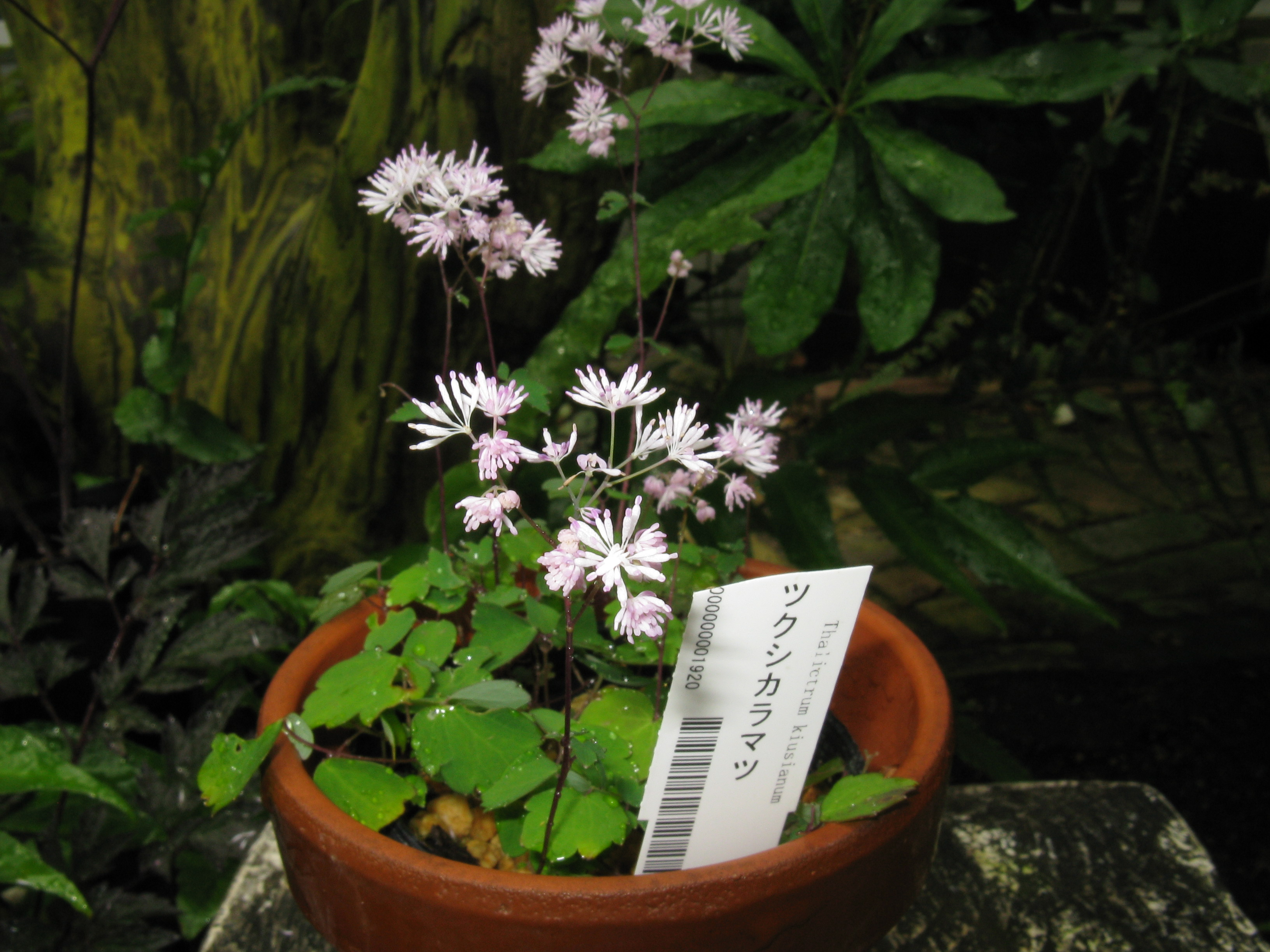
Thalictrum kiusianum

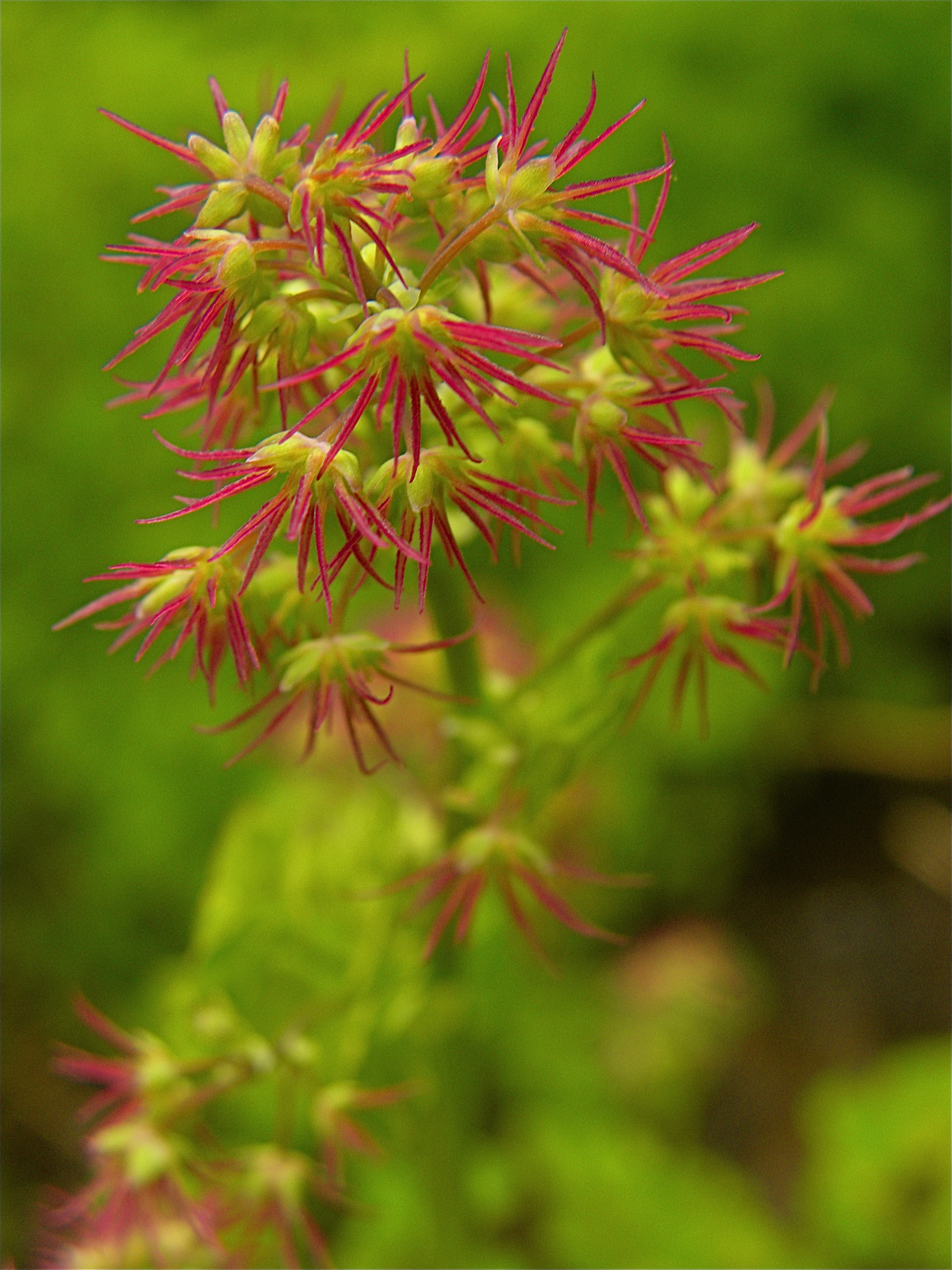
Female flowers of Thalictrum occidentale

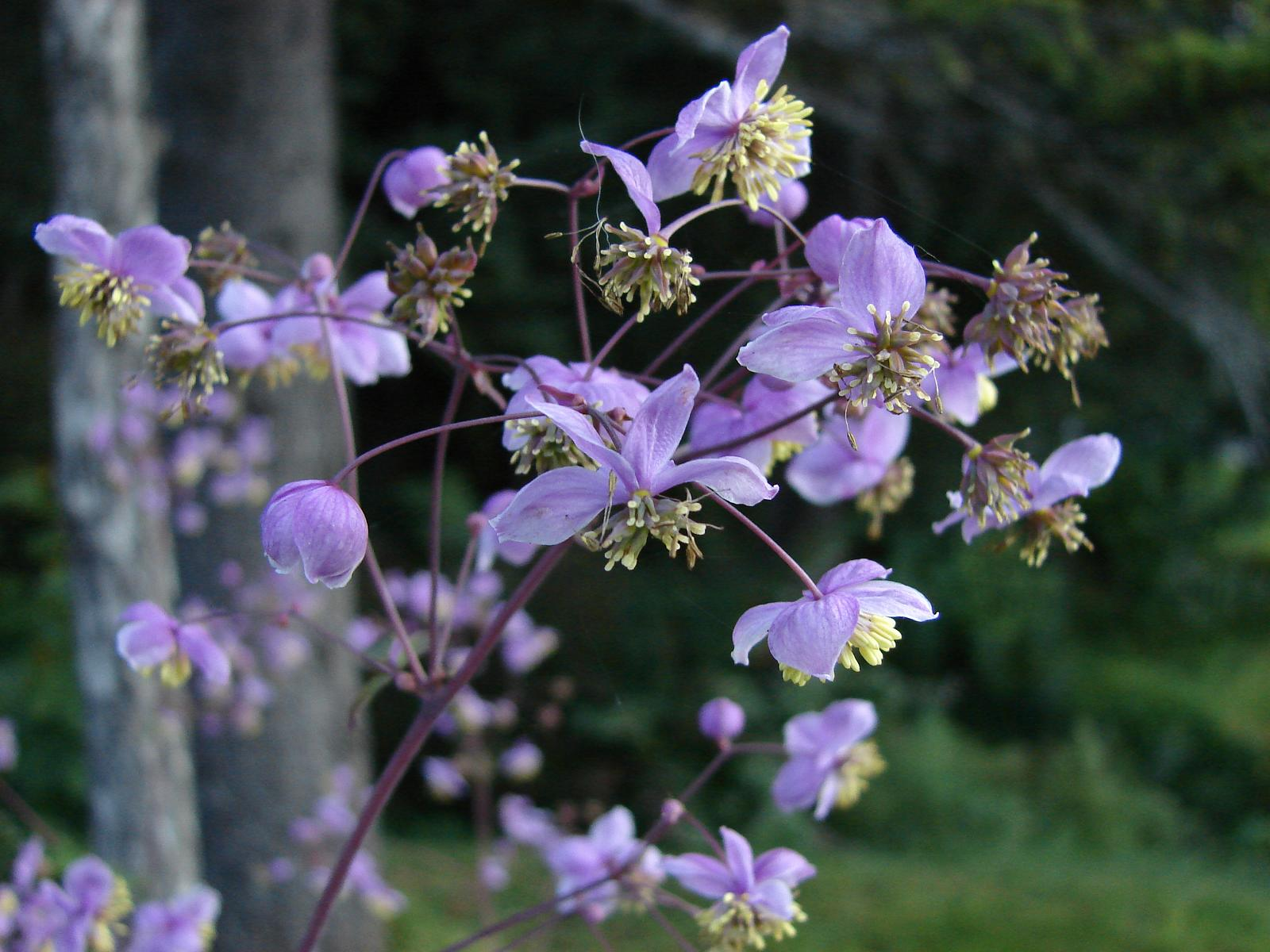
Thalictrum rochebrunnianum

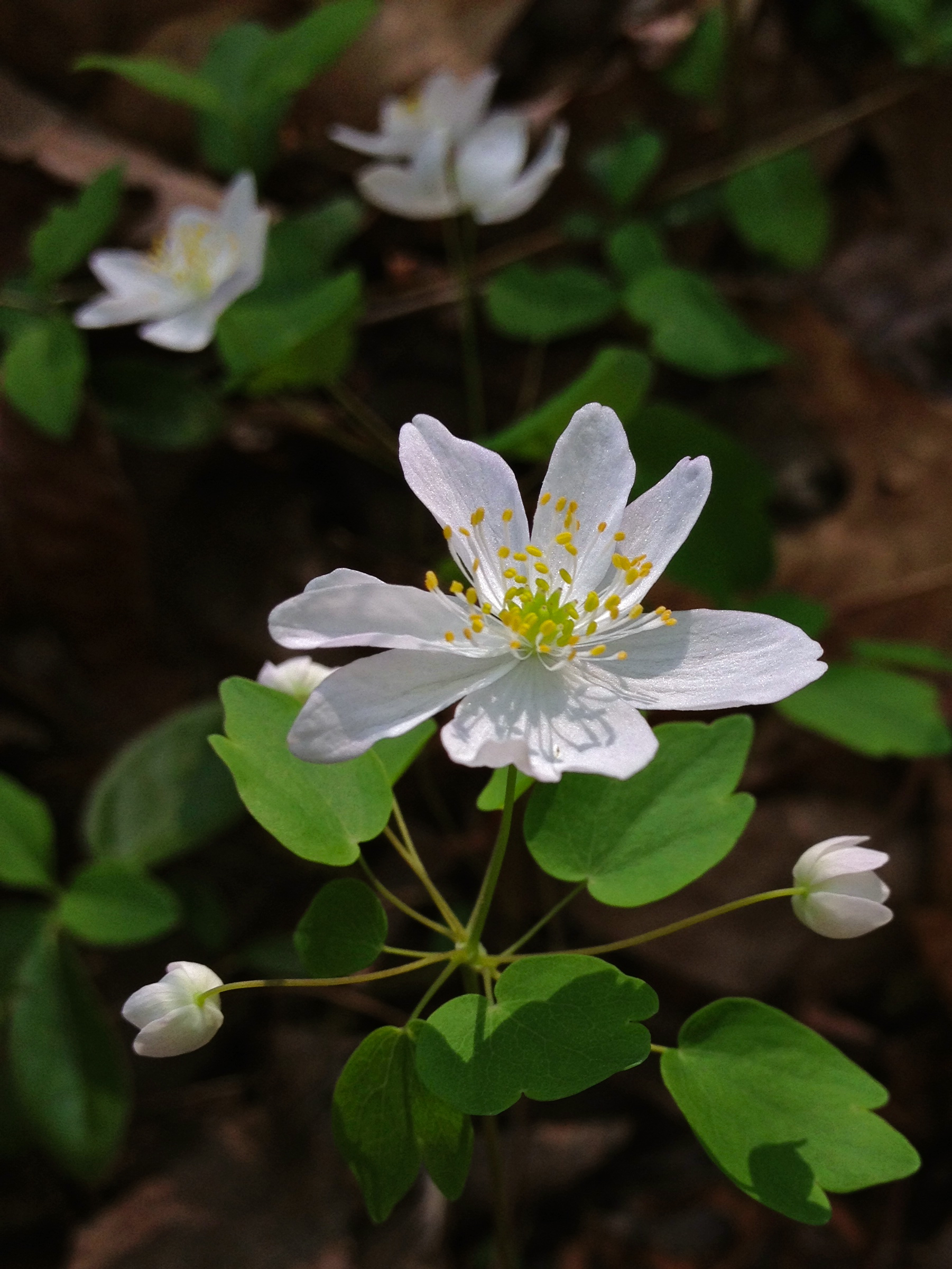
Rue-anemone (Thalictrum thalictroides)

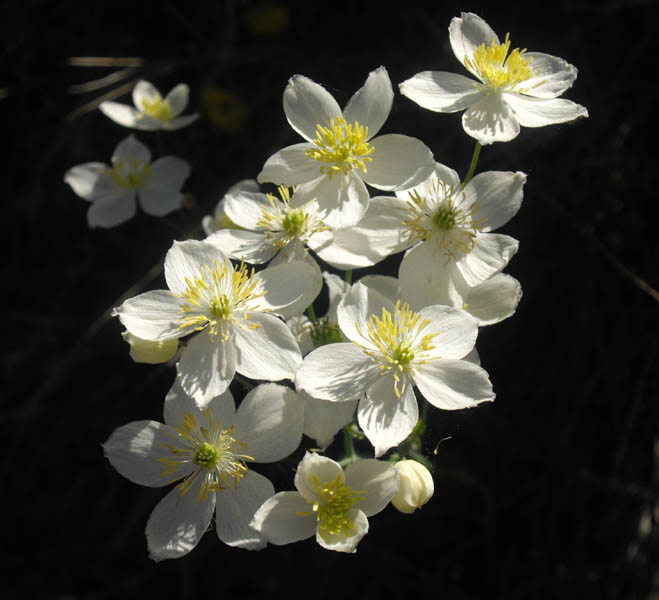
Thalictrum tuberosum

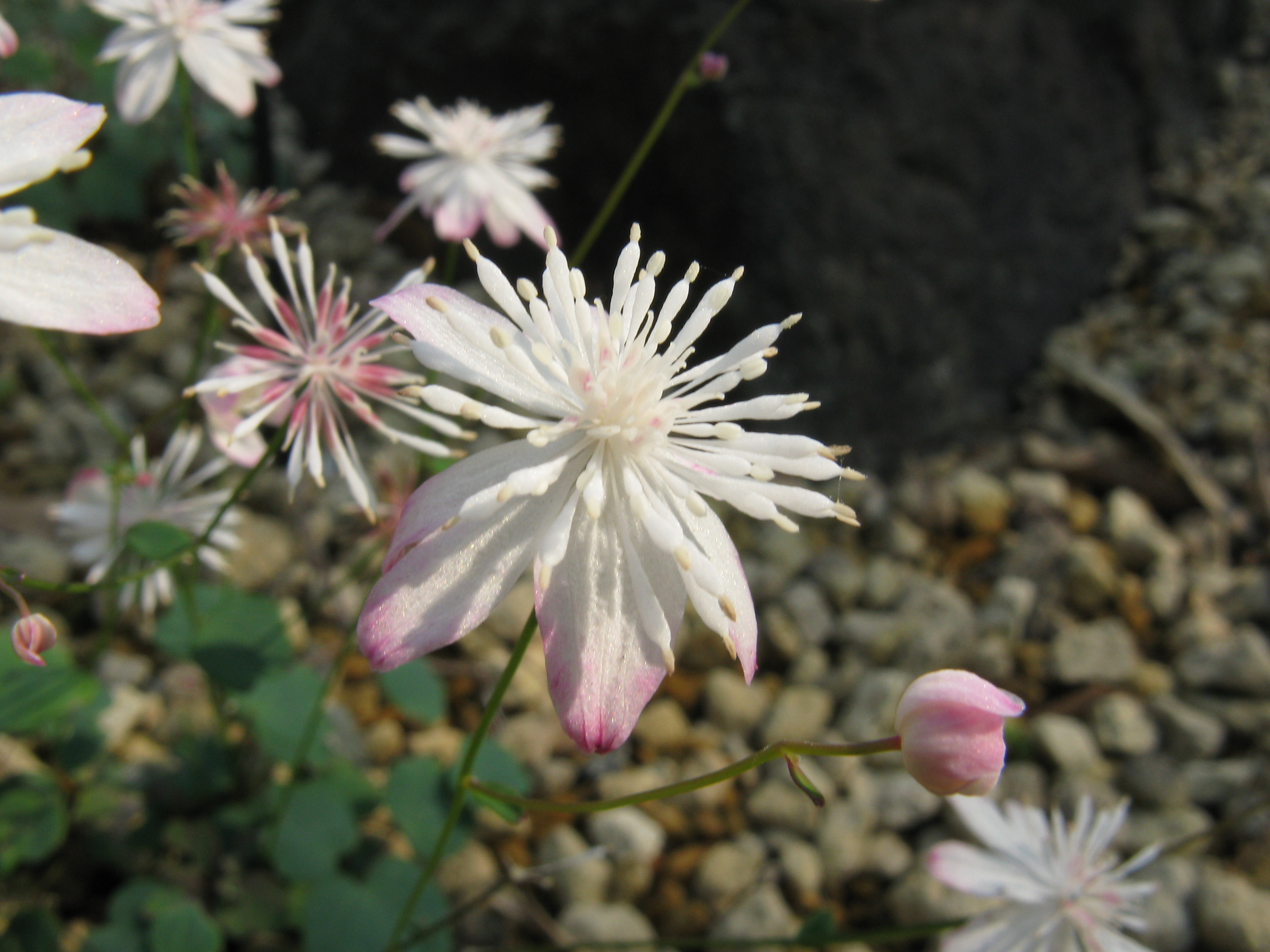
Thalictrum urbainii
