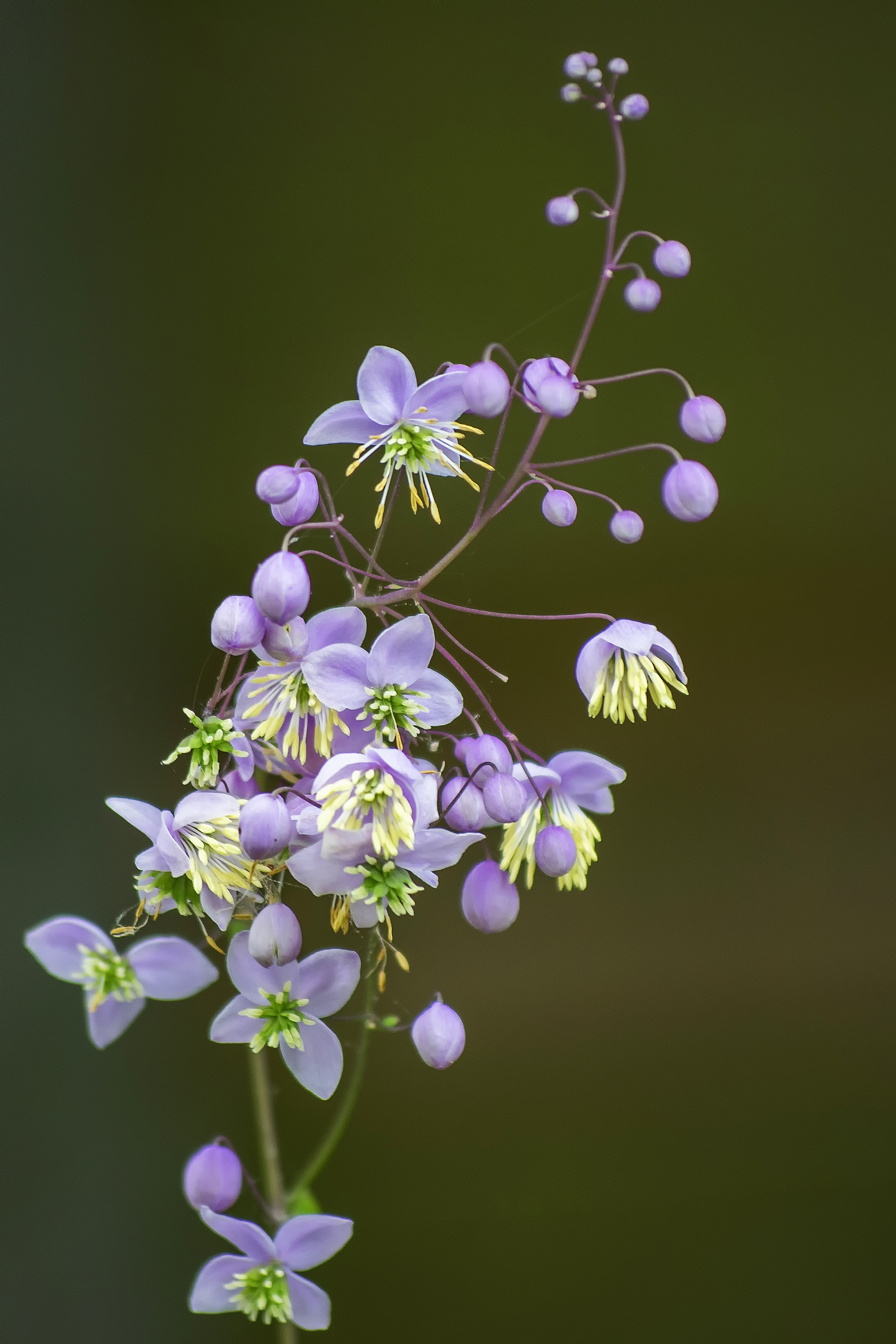
- Close-up of flowers
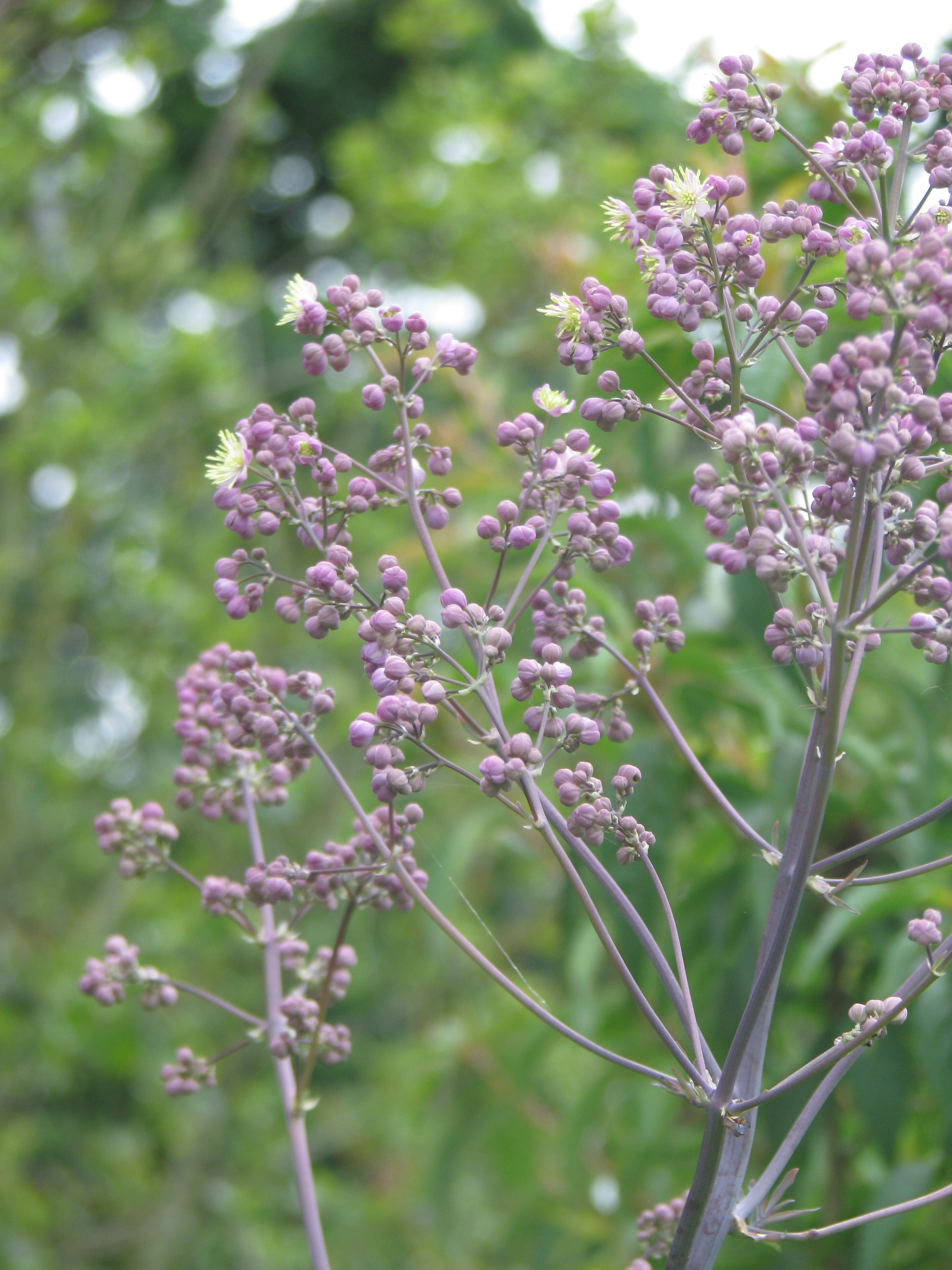
- The flowers are held well above the leaves on branched peduncles

Scientific classification
- Kingdom: Plantae
- Clade: Embryophytes
- Clade: Tracheophytes
- Clade: Spermatophytes
- Clade: Angiosperms
- Clade: Eudicots
- Order: Ranunculales
- Family: Ranunculaceae
- Genus: Thalictrum
- Species: T. rochebruneanum

Binomial name
- Thalictrum rochebruneanum Franch. & Sav.

= Thalictrum rochebruneanum =

Species of flowering plant

Thalictrum rochebruneanum, called the lavender mist meadow rue, is a species of flowering plant in the genus Thalictrum, native to the Korean Peninsula and Japan. A clumping perennial topped with a loose spray of small medium violet flowers with yellow stamens, and sometimes reaching 2 m (7 ft), it has gained the Royal Horticultural Society's Award of Garden Merit.
