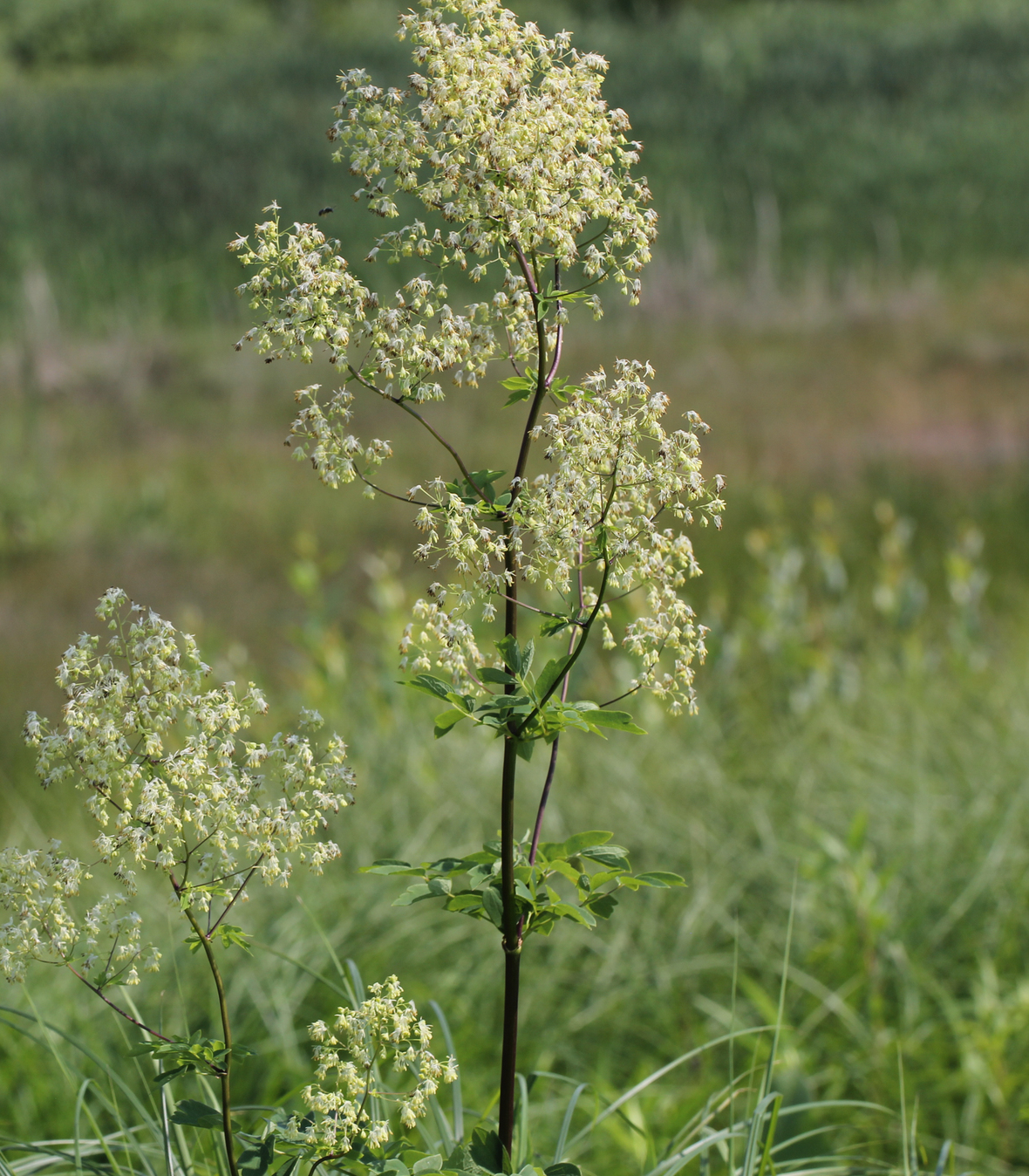

Scientific classification
- Kingdom: Plantae
- Clade: Tracheophytes
- Clade: Angiosperms
- Clade: Eudicots
- Order: Ranunculales
- Family: Ranunculaceae
- Genus: Thalictrum
- Species: T. dasycarpum

Binomial name
- Thalictrum dasycarpum Fisch. & C.A.Mey. & Avé-Lall.

= Thalictrum dasycarpum =

Species of flowering plant

Thalictrum dasycarpum, known as tall meadow rue and purple meadow-rue, is a species of flowering plant in the buttercup family, Ranunculaceae. It is native to North America.

== Description ==
Tall meadow rue is an herbaceous flowering plant with an erect habit, growing between 40–200 centimeters (16–79 in) tall. The leaves are compound, usually with 3 leaflets, though occasionally 5. Each leaflet is shallowly lobed with between 2 and 5 lobes, with otherwise smooth margins. The leaves are somewhat leathery with prominent veins. The leaf underside is usually pubescent, but occasionally hairless.

Each flowerhead comprises many flowers, borne in panicles, and is roughly pyramid in outline. It is usually dioecious, producing male and female flowers on separate plants. The small flowers—7 millimeters (0.28 in) across—lack petals but do have between 4 and 6 greenish-white sepals that are deciduous. Tall meadow rue produces flowers between late April and late July.

== Distribution and habitat ==
Tall meadow rue has a broad distribution across central North America: north to Yukon, west to Idaho, south to Texas, and east to New York state. It is found in a variety of wetland habitats, from swamps and wet meadows to prairies, as well as riparian woodlands.

== Gallery ==
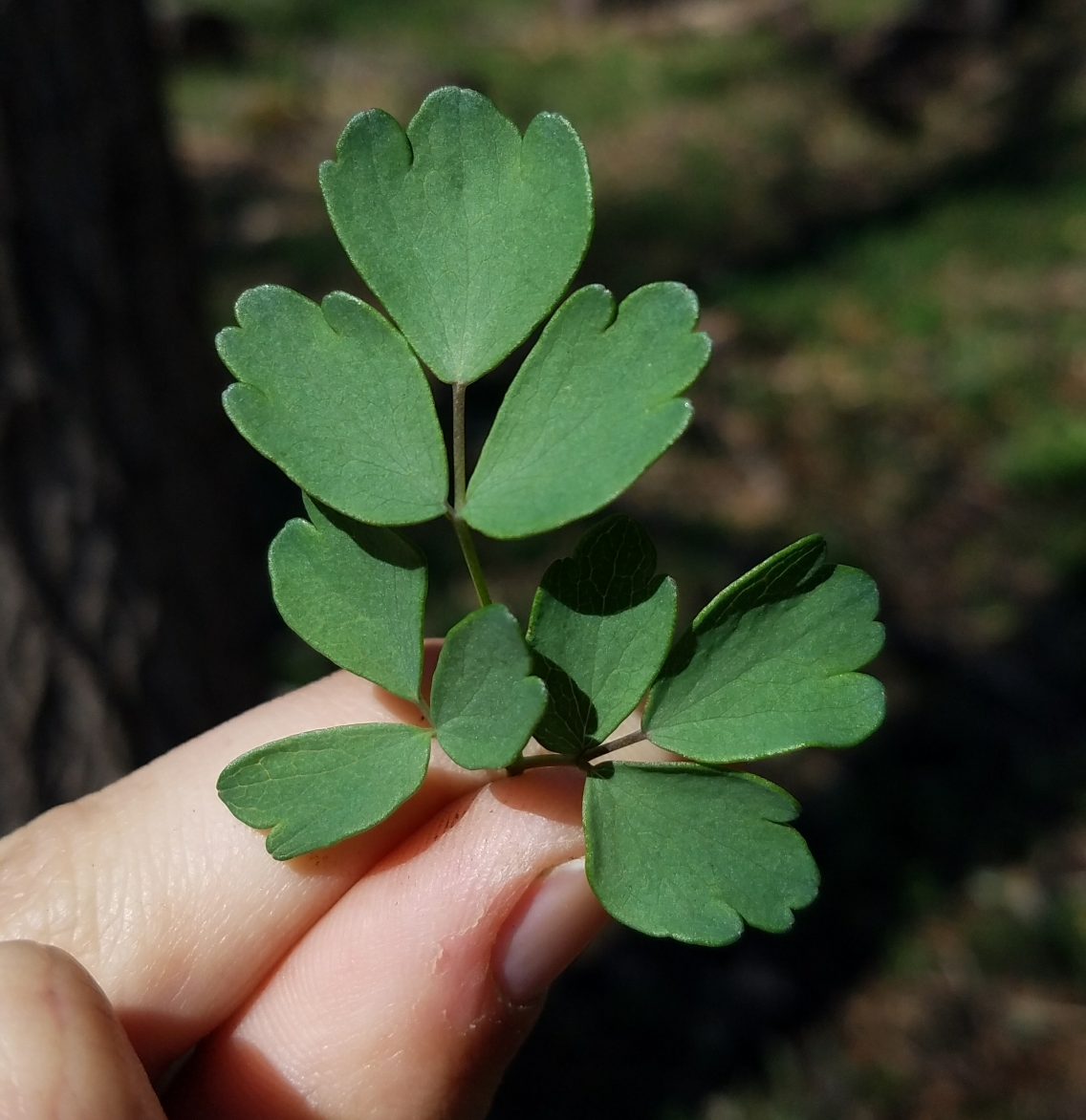
Leaves

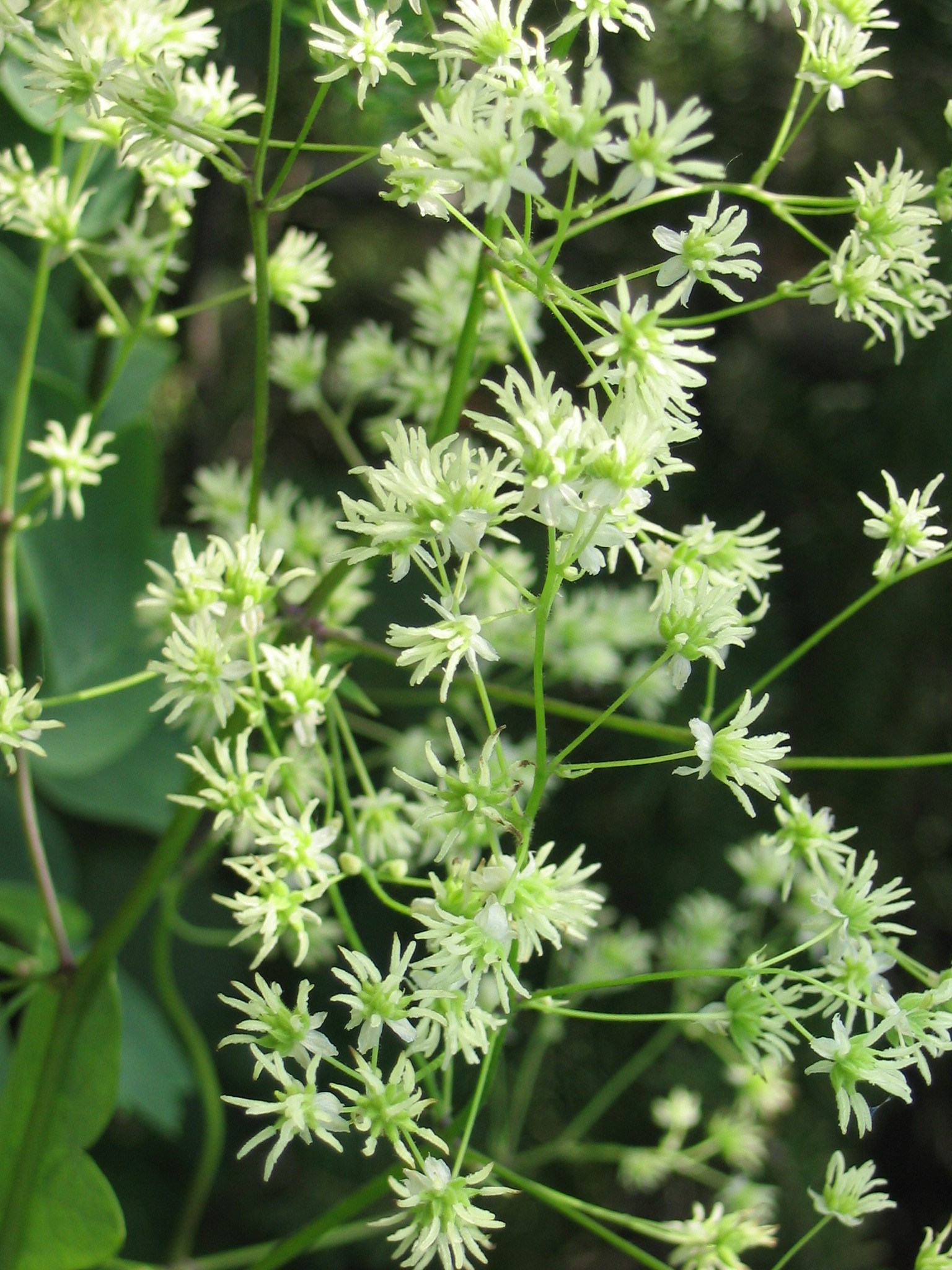
Female flowers

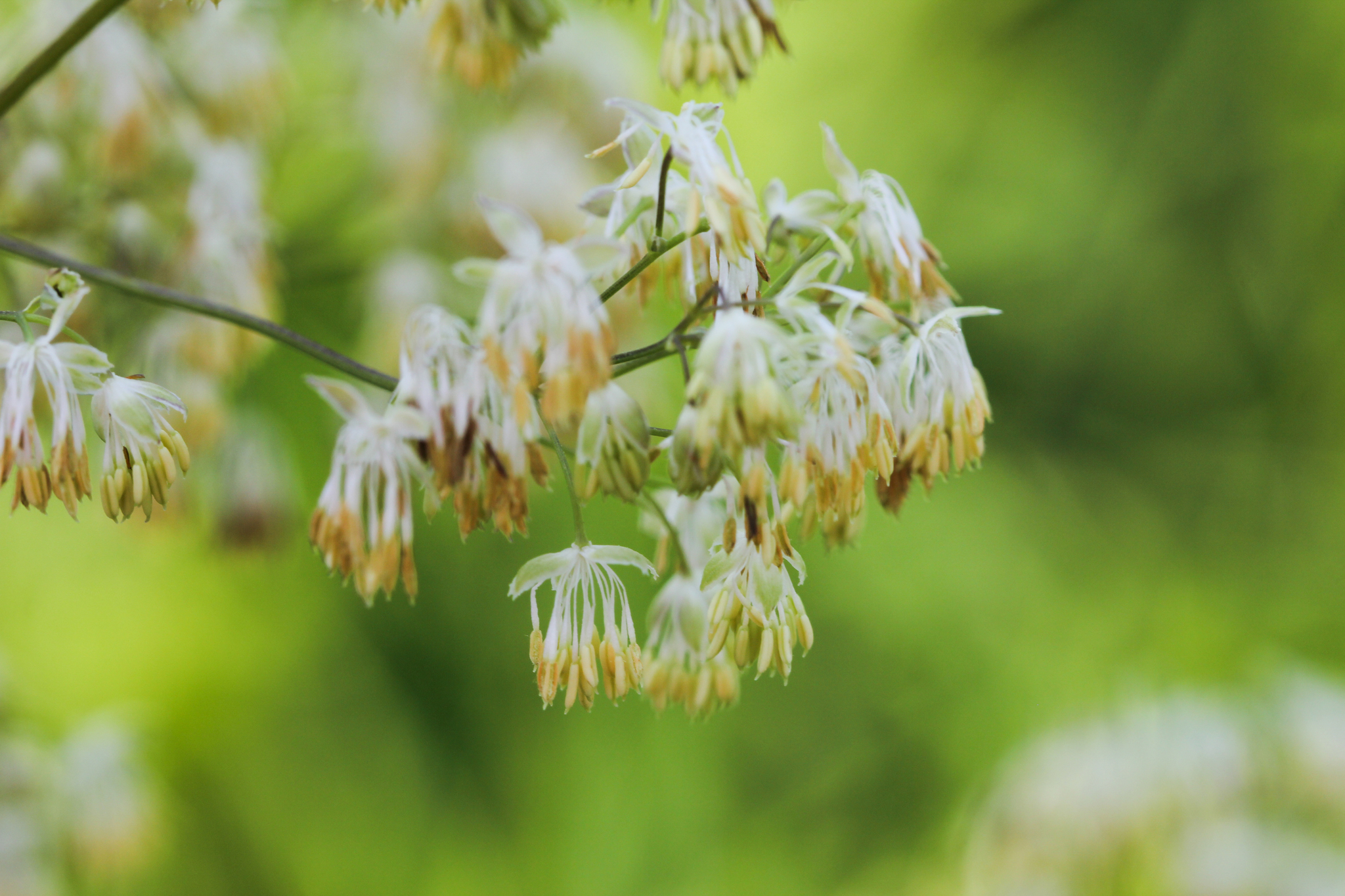
Male flowers
