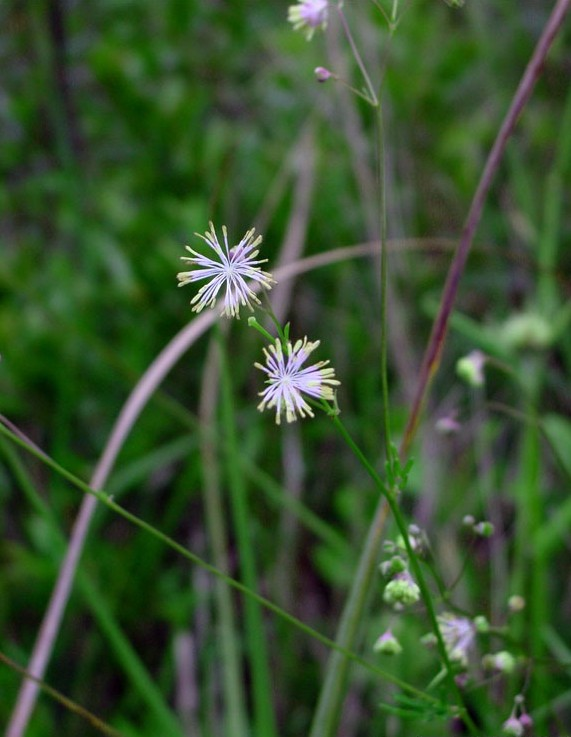

Conservation status
- Critically Imperiled (NatureServe)

- Endangered (ESA)

Scientific classification
- Kingdom: Plantae
- Clade: Tracheophytes
- Clade: Angiosperms
- Clade: Eudicots
- Order: Ranunculales
- Family: Ranunculaceae
- Genus: Thalictrum
- Species: T. cooleyi

Binomial name
- Thalictrum cooleyi H.E.Ahles

= Thalictrum cooleyi =

Species of flowering plant

Thalictrum cooleyi is a rare species of flowering plant in the buttercup family known by the common name Cooley's meadow-rue. It is native to the southeastern United States, where it is present in North Carolina, Georgia, and Florida. It is threatened by habitat destruction and degradation. It is a federally listed endangered species of the United States.

This perennial herb produces long, slender stems up to 2 metres (6.6 ft) long, sometimes growing erect. The leaves are each made up of several narrow leaflets, and some of the leaflets are divided further into lobes. Leaves near the base of the plant are borne on petioles. The inflorescence is a raceme or a panicle containing a few flowers each. The species is dioecious, with male and female flowers occurring on separate plants. The flower lacks petals. It has four or five sepals which are white or yellowish in the male flower and greenish in the female. The male to female ratio is 3:1. Blooming occurs in June and July.

There are nine populations of this plant consisting of 32 subpopulations. Twenty-four of the subpopulations are located in North Carolina and there is one in Florida. Seven subpopulations of plants have been recently discovered in Georgia; these are treated as members of this species but their taxonomy is not certain.

This plant grows in the Atlantic coastal plain province. It grows in open, moist habitat types such as savannas, bogs, and swamp forests. The soil is generally a sandy loam which is neutral or slightly acidic and wet at least part of the year. The plant can be found in spots that are moist or saturated but have no standing water. The plant also requires sun. The habitat is maintained by disturbance that keeps it clear of encroaching vegetation. Naturally this occurs during periodic wildfires. In the absence of a normal fire regime the plant grows in areas that are kept clear and open by other means, including human activities such as mowing. The plant may occur on roadsides, an area of high disturbance. Plants growing in deep shade are stunted. They also have less erect stems and delayed flowering. Sunny areas that have recently burned produce the most robust plants.

Threats to the species include habitat degradation in areas where fire suppression is practiced. In these areas ecological succession occurs and large, woody vegetation moves in. The meadowrue and other herbs are shaded out or outcompeted. Habitat has been claimed for silviculture operations, and the plant cannot grow in these converted areas. While the plant is more likely to occur in disturbed areas, it does not tolerate severe disturbance such as bulldozing or herbicide application.
