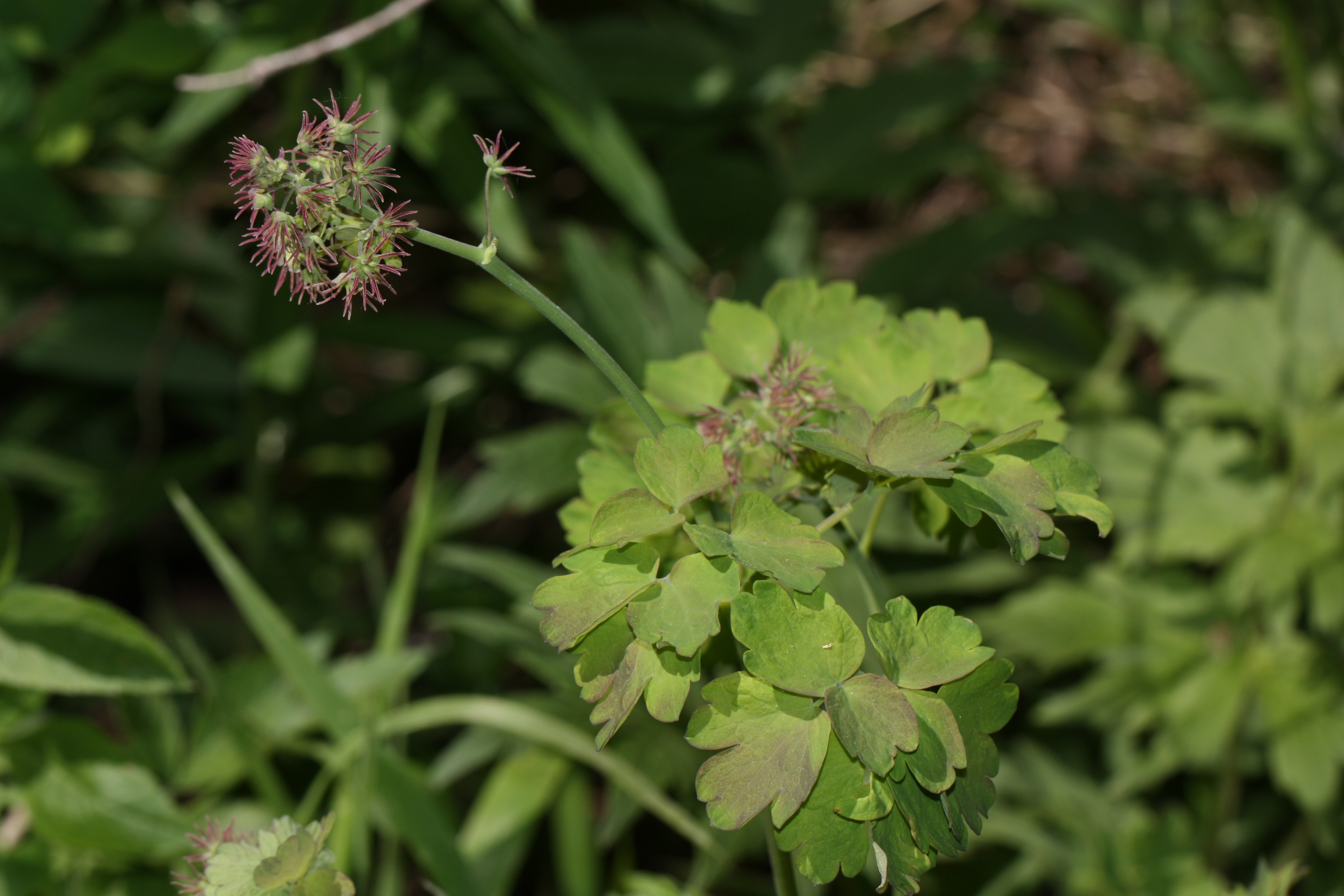
- Female flowers (shown) have 1.5 to 2 mm long sepals, no petals, and up to 15 purple stigmas, 3 to 4.5 mm long including the style.

Scientific classification
- Kingdom: Plantae
- Clade: Tracheophytes
- Clade: Angiosperms
- Clade: Eudicots
- Order: Ranunculales
- Family: Ranunculaceae
- Genus: Thalictrum
- Species: T. occidentale

Binomial name
- Thalictrum occidentale A.Gray

= Thalictrum occidentale =

Species of flowering plant

Thalictrum occidentale is a species of flowering plant in the buttercup family known by the common name western meadow-rue. It is native to northwestern North America from Alaska and western Canada to northern California to Wyoming and Colorado, where it grows in shady habitat types such as forest understory and more open, moist habitat such as meadows.

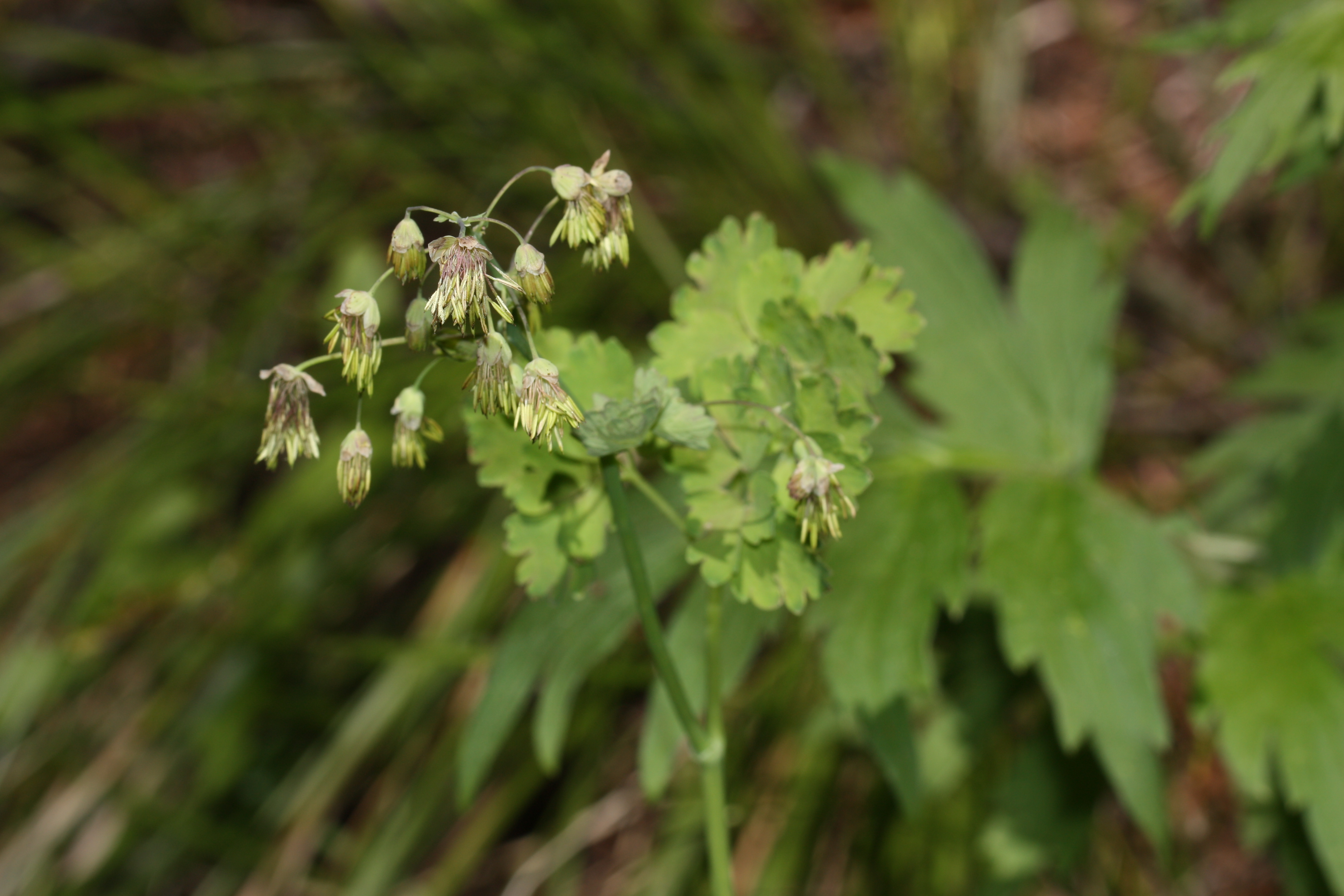
Male flowers (shown) have four, sometimes six, light green to purplish, obovate 3.5 to 4.5 mm long sepals, no petals, and 15 to 30 disordered hanging stamens with purple-brown threadlike filaments, 4 to 10 mm long. The anthers are sharp-tipped, 1.5 to 4 mm long.

Thalictrum occidentale is a perennial herb growing erect to a maximum height around a meter. It is hairless to lightly hairy and glandular. The leaves have compound blades divided into a few or many segments, often with three lobes, and are borne on long, slender petioles. The inflorescence is an upright or arching panicle of flowers with leaflike, lobed bracts often growing at the base. The species is dioecious, with male and female flowers occurring on separate plants, and is wind pollinated. The male flower has a bell-shaped calyx of four sepals in shades of greenish white or purple. From the calyx dangle many long, purple stamens tipped with large anthers. The female flower has a cluster of immature fruits tipped with styles in shades of purple. A cluster has 4 to 9, at times up to 14, fruits.
