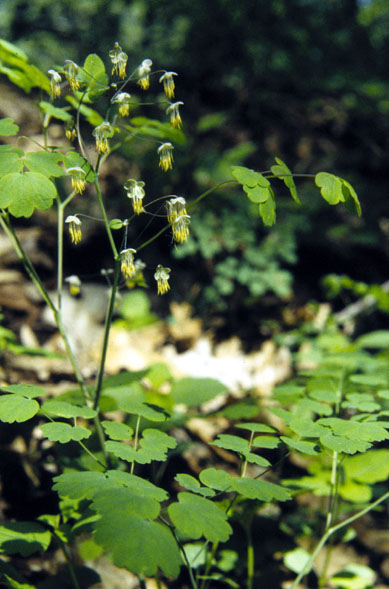

Conservation status
- Secure (NatureServe)

Scientific classification
- Kingdom: Plantae
- Clade: Tracheophytes
- Clade: Angiosperms
- Clade: Eudicots
- Order: Ranunculales
- Family: Ranunculaceae
- Genus: Thalictrum
- Species: T. dioicum

Binomial name
- Thalictrum dioicum L.

= Thalictrum dioicum =

Species of flowering plant

Thalictrum dioicum, the early meadow-rue or quicksilver-weed, is a species of herbaceous plants in the family Ranunculaceae. Plants are typically upright growing woodland natives from Colorado Rocky Mountain forests to central and eastern North America including parts of south eastern Canada. This species has dioecious plants, with male and female flowers on separate plants blooming in early to mid spring.

Thalictrum dioicum grows from 30 to 80 cm tall, from upright caudex, with yellow-gold colored – thick fibrous roots. New caudexes are generated each year by the current years plant and the old caudex withers away in the fall and early spring of the next year. In early spring plants grow, producing glabrous or glandular leaves. both basal and cauline leaves are produced that have long petioles. Leaf blades are 1-4×-ternately compound with leaflets reniform or cordate to obovate or orbiculate in shape. The leaflets are 10–45 mm wide with lobed margins often crenate, and the undersides are normally glabrous or glandular. Inflorescences are panicles or corymbs produced terminally and axillary with many flowered branches. The flowers have no petals but have greenish colored, 1.8–4 mm long sepals sometimes tinted purple. The sepals are ovate to obovate or oval in shape. On male plants, the flower filaments are the most showy part of the hanging flowers, being yellow to greenish yellow in color and 3.5-5.5 mm long. The filaments end in anthers 2–4 mm long that are mucronate to acuminate in shape with purple colored stigma. After blooming, female plants if fertilized, produce green fruits called achenes. Each flower that is fertilized typically produces (3-)7 to 13 achenes that are not reflexed and sessile or nearly so in tight clusters. The achenes are ovoid to ellipsoid in shape and not laterally compressed, 3.5–5 mm long, glabrous, very strongly veined, with 1.5 to 3 mm long beaks, ripening in mid summer.

Plants are grown in shade gardens for their attractive lacy foliage that is reminiscent of columbines or maiden hair fern. The males produce more showy flowers than the female plants, blooming in early spring with the flowers and foliage rising out of the ground in club-like clusters with the basal leaves unfolding first. Plants start to flower before the compound leaves have completely unfolded. This species, like some others of its genus, is pollinated via wind action (anemophily). Males start off the year taller than the females, but as the fruits grow females are taller typically in summer.
