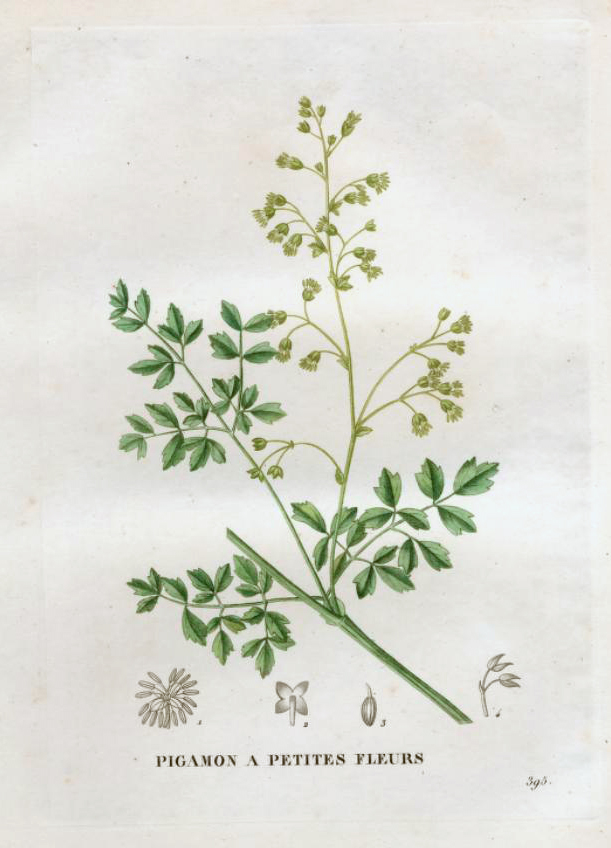

Scientific classification
- Kingdom: Plantae
- Clade: Tracheophytes
- Clade: Angiosperms
- Clade: Eudicots
- Order: Ranunculales
- Family: Ranunculaceae
- Genus: Thalictrum
- Species: T. minus

Binomial name
- Thalictrum minus L.

= Thalictrum minus =

Species of herb

Thalictrum minus, known as lesser meadow-rue, is a perennial herb in the family Ranunculaceae that is native to Europe, Northwest Africa, Yemen, Ethiopia, South Africa, Southwest Asia, and Siberia. It grows on sand dunes, shingle, coastal rocks or calcareous grassland, cliffs and rocky gullies at up to 1,600 to 3,000 m (5,200 to 9,800 ft) elevation at southern latitudes. It grows to 30 cm (0.98 ft) tall with erect stems and 1 cm (0.39 in) leaves that are highly subdivided, 3-4 ternate to pinnate.

The plant contains an alkaloid 'Thalidasine', which is also present in other Thalictrum species.
