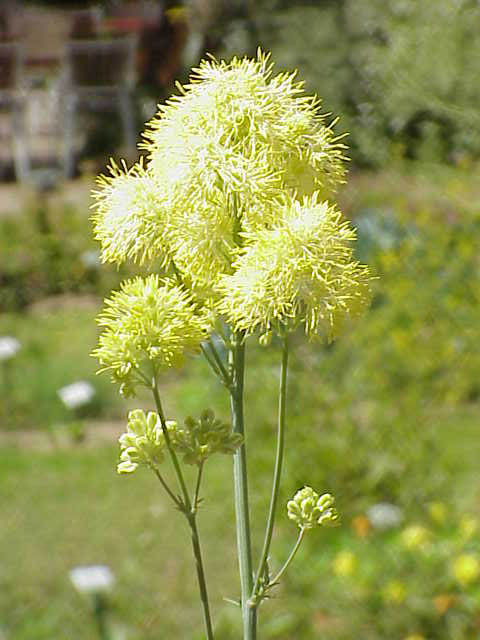

Scientific classification
- Kingdom: Plantae
- Clade: Tracheophytes
- Clade: Angiosperms
- Clade: Eudicots
- Order: Ranunculales
- Family: Ranunculaceae
- Genus: Thalictrum
- Species: T. speciosissimum

Binomial name
- Thalictrum speciosissimum Loefl. (1758)

Subspecies
- Thalictrum speciosissimum subsp. albini (Pau) P.Monts.; Thalictrum speciosissimum subsp. speciosissimum

Synonyms
- Thalictrum flavum var. speciosissimum (Loefl.) Roth (1789)

= Thalictrum speciosissimum =

Species of flowering plant

Thalictrum speciocissimum is a species of meadow-rue (Thalictrum). It is native to Portugal and Spain on the Iberian Peninsula, and to Morocco and Algeria in northwestern Africa.

It is a species in the Betic-Rifan flora, a group of plant species common to the Baetic mountains of southern Spain and the Rif mountains of northern Morocco.

Two subspecies are accepted.

- Thalictrum speciosissimum subsp. albini (Pau) P.Monts. (synonym Thalictrum albini Pau) – Spain
- Thalictrum speciosissimum subsp. speciosissimum (synonyms Thalictrum angulosum Desf., T. cinereum Desf., T. cuneatum Rchb., T. densiflorum Kunth ex DC., T. discolor Willd., T. flavum subsp. glaucum (Desf.) Batt., T. flavum var. speciosum L., T. glaucum Desf., T. speciosum (L.) Poir.) – Algeria, Morocco, Portugal, and Spain
