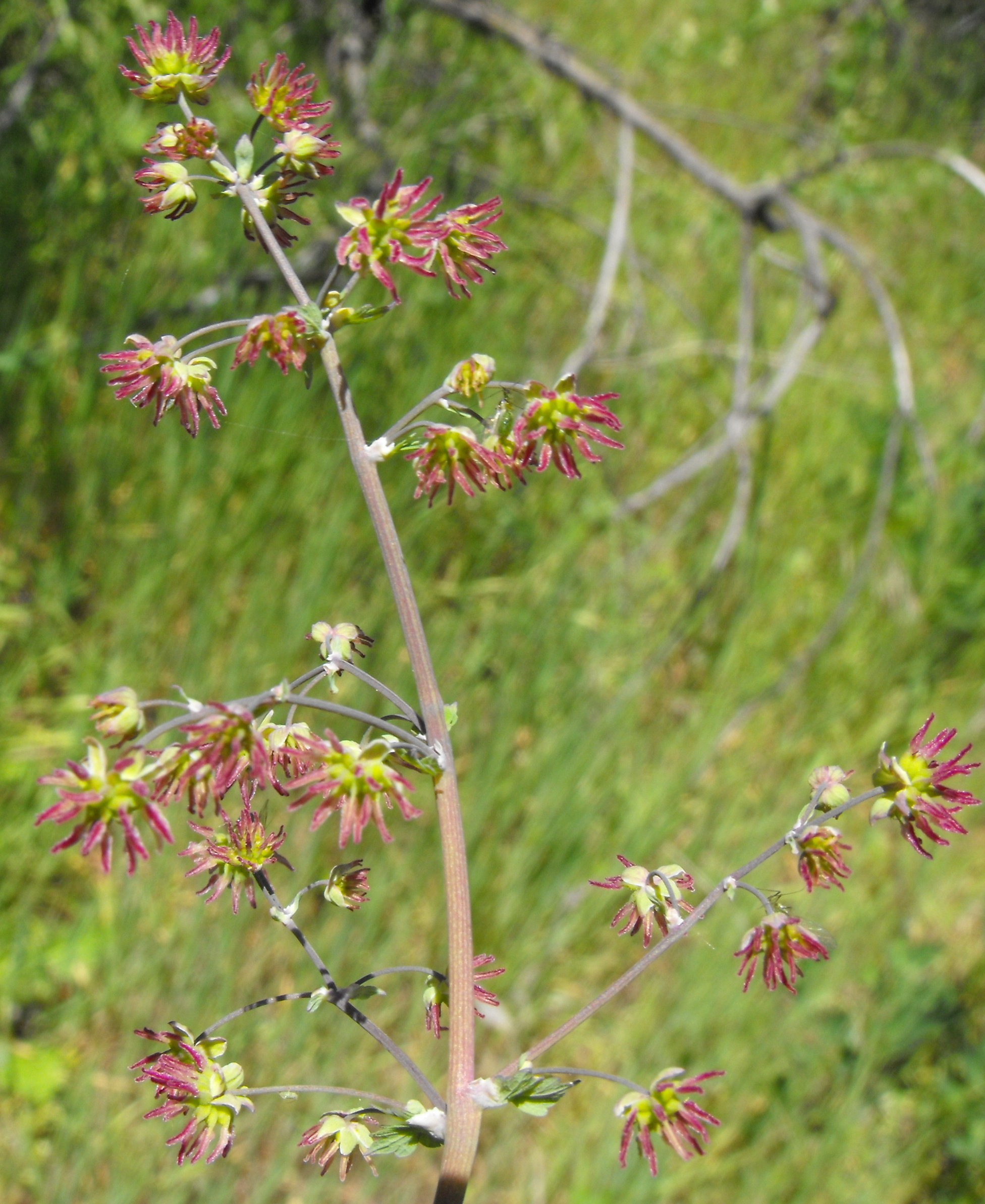

Conservation status
- Secure (NatureServe)

Scientific classification
- Kingdom: Plantae
- Clade: Tracheophytes
- Clade: Angiosperms
- Clade: Eudicots
- Order: Ranunculales
- Family: Ranunculaceae
- Genus: Thalictrum
- Species: T. fendleri

Binomial name
- Thalictrum fendleri Engelm. ex A.Gray

= Thalictrum fendleri =

Species of flowering plant

Thalictrum fendleri is a species of flowering plant in the buttercup family known by the common name Fendler's meadow-rue. It is named in honor of Augustus Fendler.

The plant is native to western North America, including much of the western United States and northern Mexico. It is a common plant found in many types of habitats, including open places to shaded areas in woodlands and forests.

It is anemophilous (pollinated via wind action).

== Description ==
Thalictrum fendleri is a perennial herb growing erect to 1–2 metres (3.3–6.6 ft) tall. The hairless stems are green to purple in color.

The leaves have compound blades divided into a few or many segments of varying shapes, often with three lobes, and are borne on long, slender petioles. The blades are hairless to slightly fuzzy and glandular.

The inflorescence is an upright or arching panicle of flowers. The species is usually dioecious, with male and female flowers occurring on separate plants, but plants with bisexual flowers have been noted. The male flower has a bell-shaped calyx of four sepals in shades of greenish white or purple which may lighten to white with age. From the calyx dangle many long, yellow or purple stamens tipped with large anthers.

The female flower has a cluster of immature fruits tipped with styles in shades of light to deep, bright pink. As the fruits develop the styles wither to hard, black stubs. A cluster may have up to 20 fruits.

There are three recognized subspecies of Thalictrum fendleri:

Thilactrum fendleri var. fendleri, which is found in AZ, CA, CO, ID, NM, NV, OR, TX, UT, WY.

Thilactrum fendleri var. wrighti which is found in AZ, NM, TX.

Thilactrum fendleri var. polycarpum which is found in CA, NV, OR, UT.

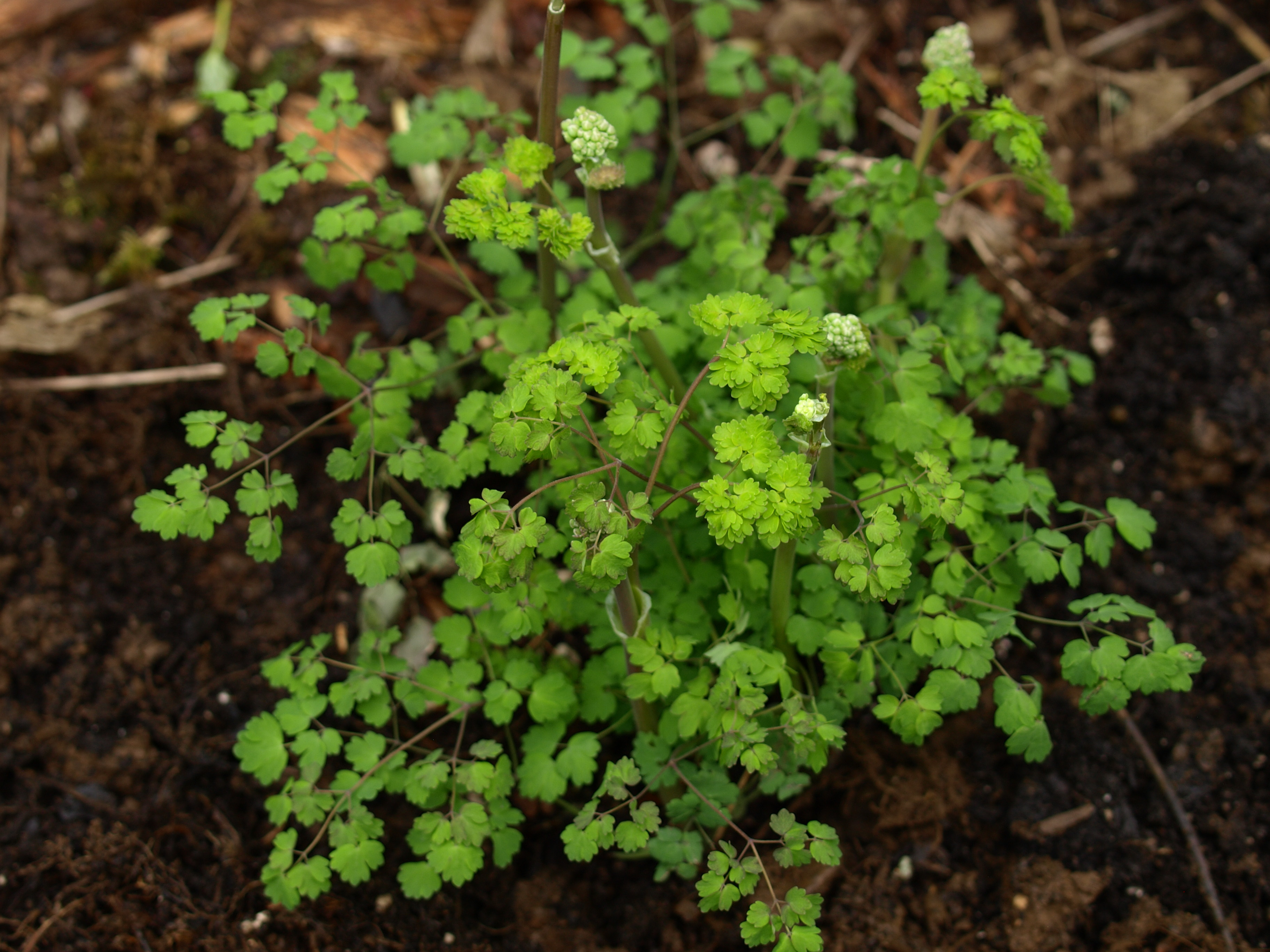
thalictrum fendleri var. polycarpum
