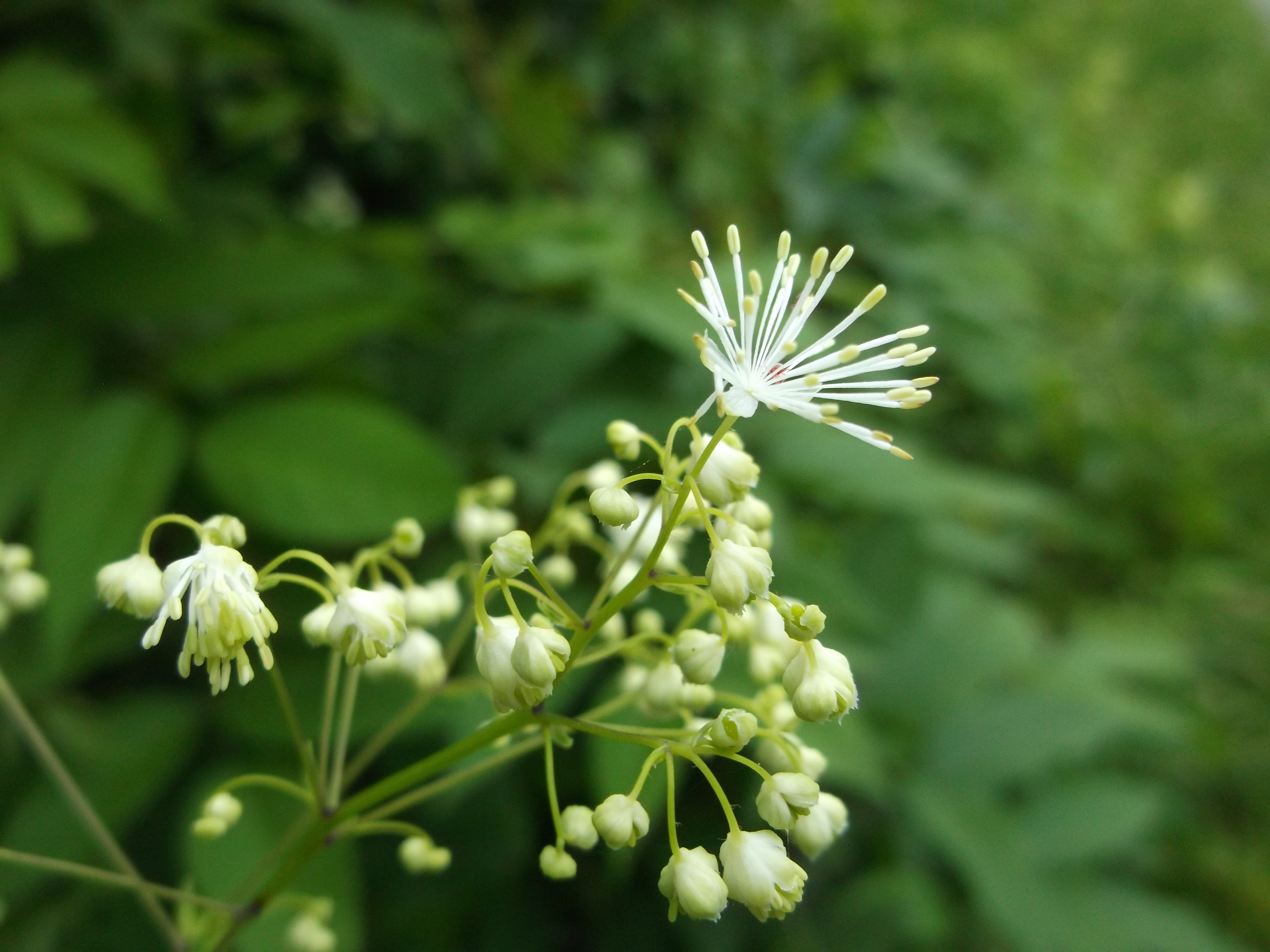
- In Ottawa, Ontario

Conservation status
- Secure (NatureServe)

Scientific classification
- Kingdom: Plantae
- Clade: Tracheophytes
- Clade: Angiosperms
- Clade: Eudicots
- Order: Ranunculales
- Family: Ranunculaceae
- Genus: Thalictrum
- Species: T. pubescens

Binomial name
- Thalictrum pubescens Pursh

Synonyms
- List: Anemone walteri Pursh; Leucocoma vegeta (Greene) Lunell; Thalictrum bissellii Greene; Thalictrum canadense var. hebecarpum (Fernald) House; Thalictrum carolinianum Walter; Thalictrum cornuti var. dubitatum Alph.Wood; Thalictrum cornuti var. stipitum Farw.; Thalictrum corynellum DC.; Thalictrum divaricatum Lecoy.; Thalictrum divergens Link; Thalictrum glaucodeum Greene; Thalictrum glaucum Schrad.; Thalictrum hepaticum Greene; Thalictrum leucocrinum Greene; Thalictrum leucostemon K.Koch & C.D.Bouché; Thalictrum leucostylum Link ex Lecoy.; Thalictrum mortonii Greene; Thalictrum perelegans Greene; Thalictrum polygamum Muhl. ex Spreng.; Thalictrum polygamum Muhl. ex Pursh; Thalictrum polygamum Muhl. ex DC.; Thalictrum pubescens var. hebecarpum (Fernald) B.Boivin; Thalictrum pubescens var. hepaticum (Greene) Keener; Thalictrum revolutum Fisch. ex Lecoy.; Thalictrum setulosum Greene; Thalictrum terrae-novae Greene; Thalictrum tortuosum Greene; Thalictrum vegetum Greene; Thalictrum viride Greene; Thalictrum walteri (Pursh) Spreng. ex Steud.; Thalictrum zibellinum Greene

= Thalictrum pubescens =

Species of flowering plant

Thalictrum pubescens, the king of the meadow or tall meadow-rue, is a plant in the buttercup family, Ranunculaceae.

== Description ==
Thalictrum pubescens is a herbaceous plant with alternate, pinnately compound leaves, on hollow, green stems. The flowers are white, borne in spring and summer.

== Distribution ==
The range of this plant includes most of eastern Canada and United States excluding Florida.
