= List of Ranunculales of Montana =

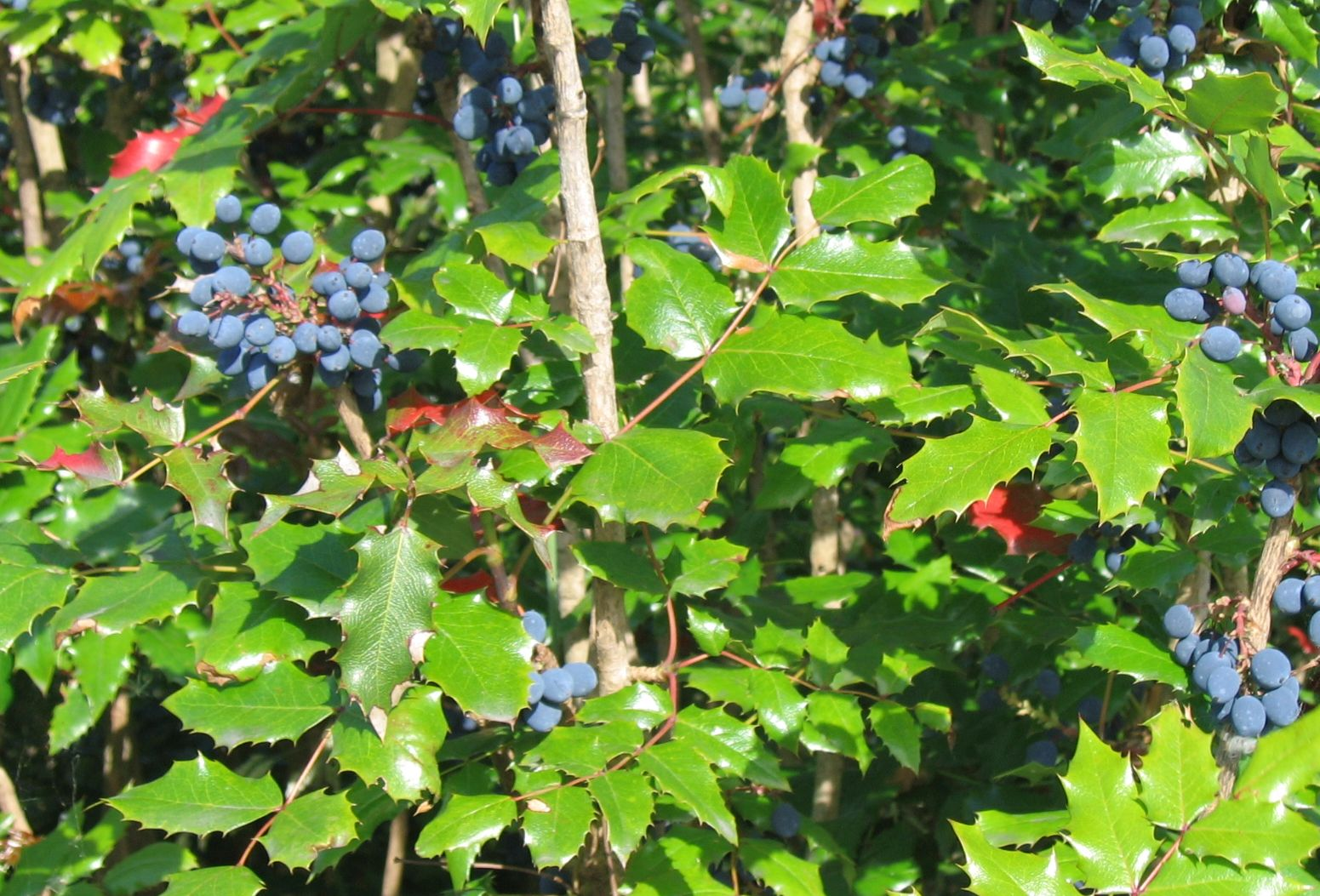
Oregon-grape

There are at least 78 members of the barberry and buttercup order, Ranunculales, found in Montana. Some of these species are exotics (not native to Montana) and some species have been designated as Species of Concern.

== Barberries ==
Family: Berberidaceae

- Berberis repens, creeping Oregon-grape
- Berberis vulgaris, European Barberry
- Berberis nervosa, longleaf Oregon-grape
- Berberis aquifolium, Piper's Oregon-grape

== Buttercups ==
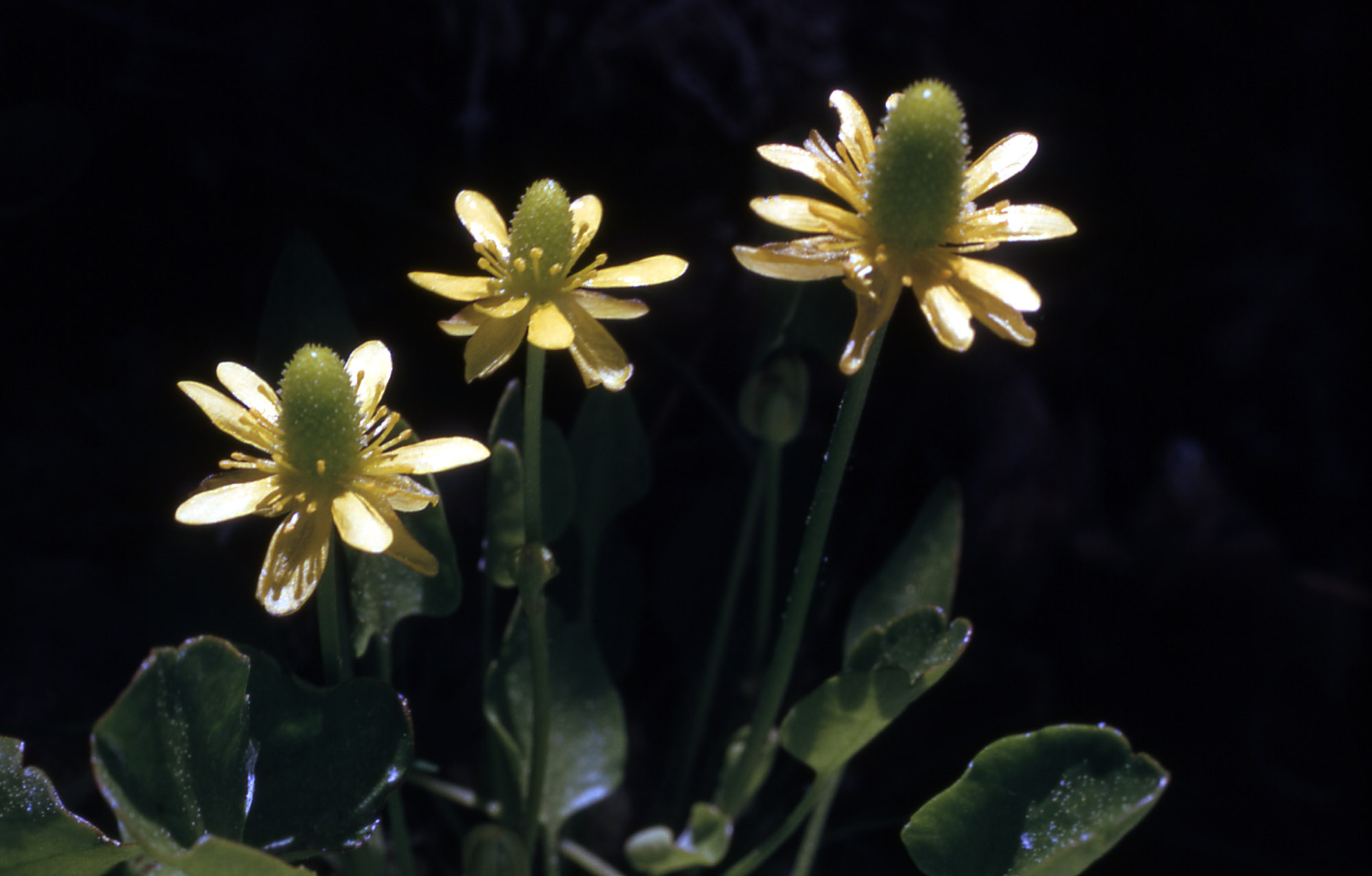
Alkali buttercup

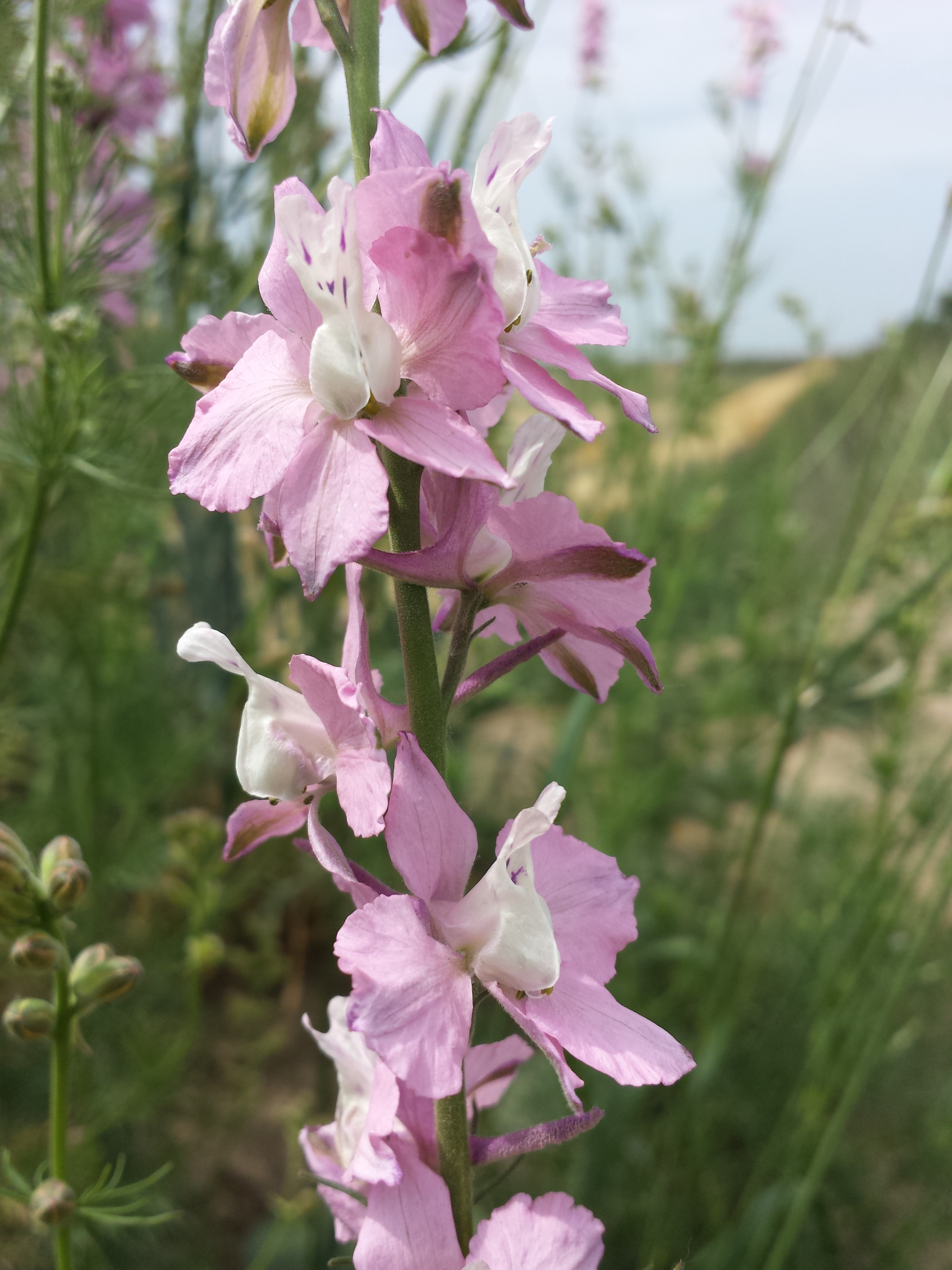
Doubtful knights-spur

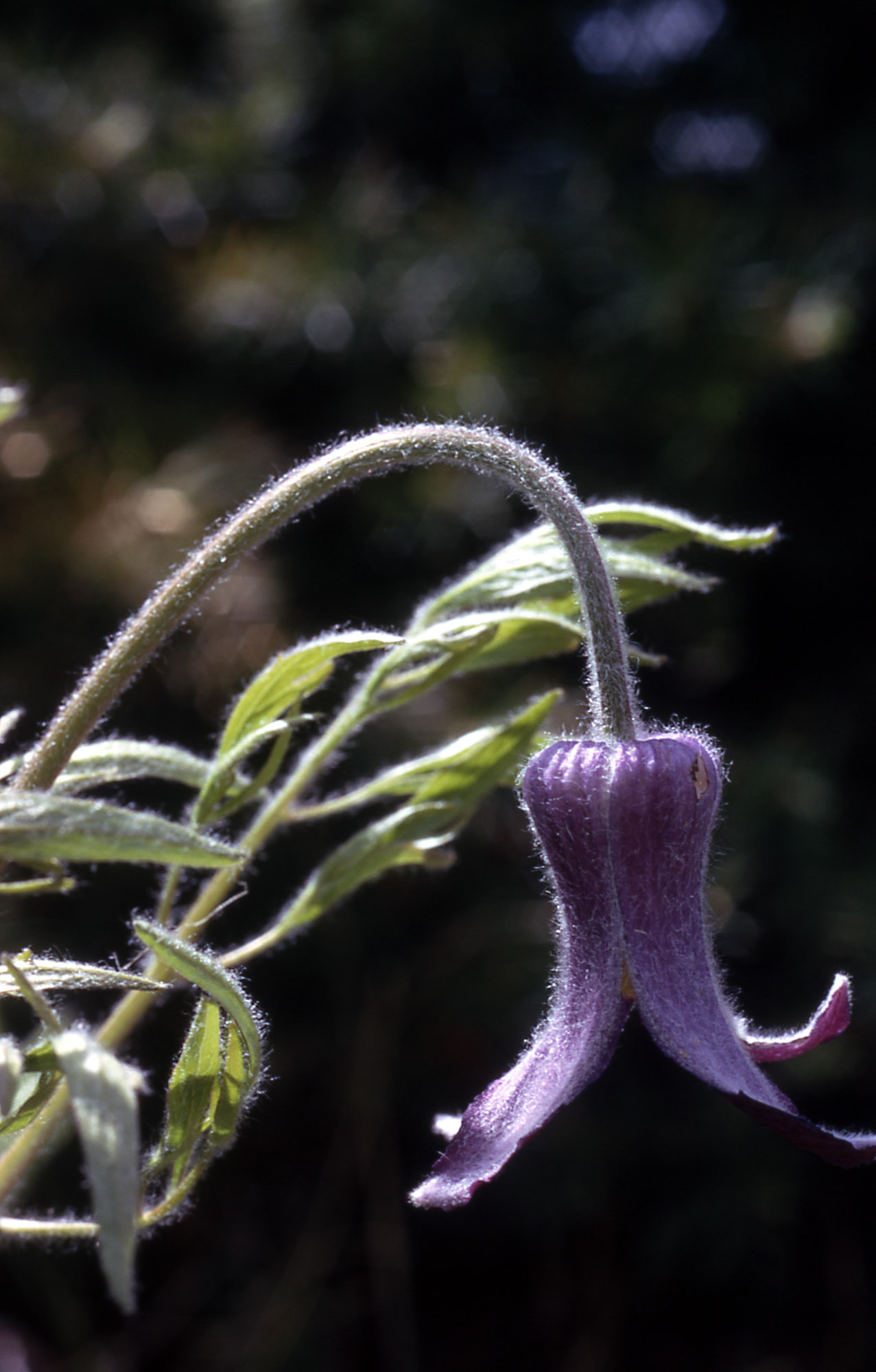
Sugarbowls

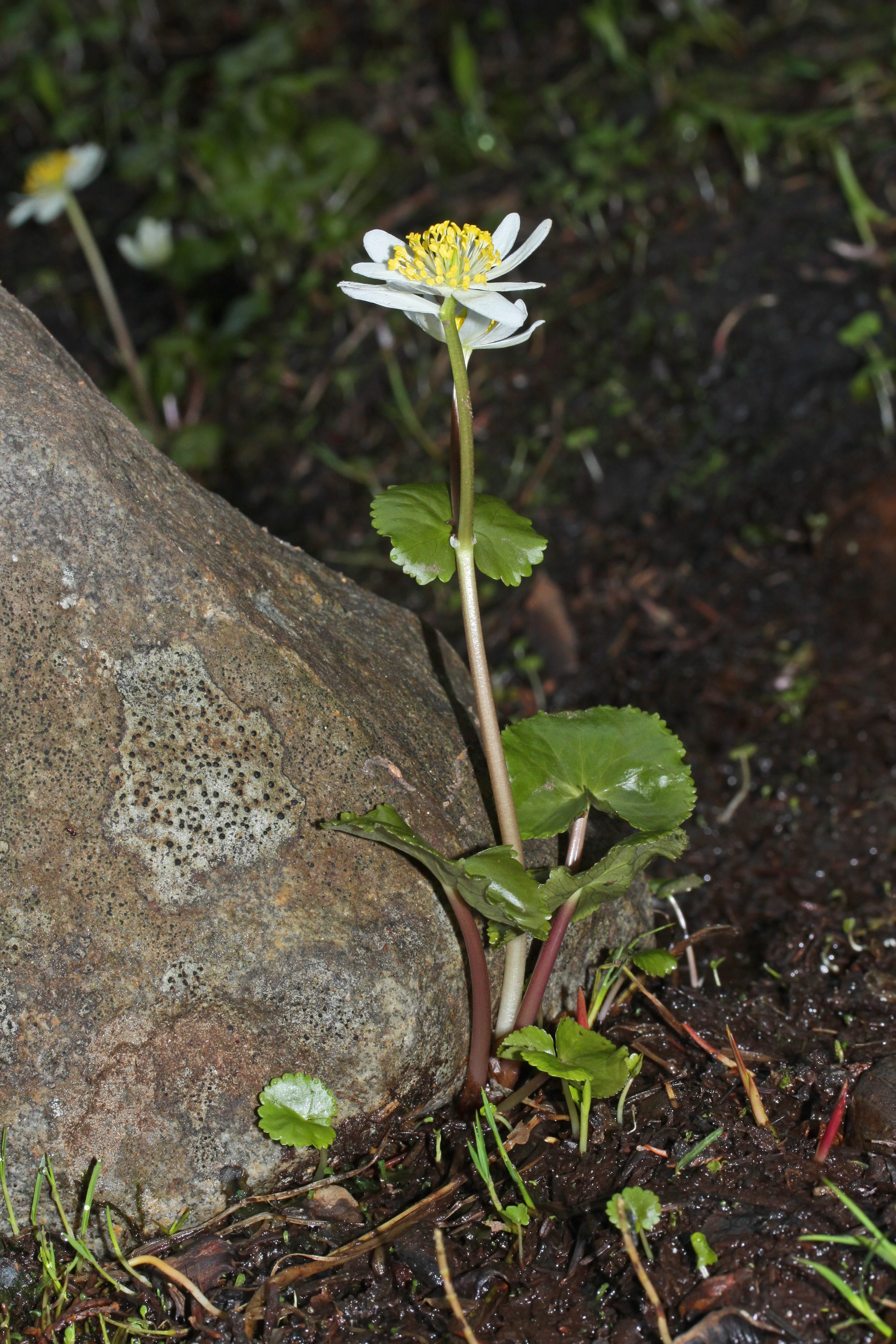
White marsh marigold

Family: Ranunculaceae

- Aconitum columbianum, Columbia monkshood
- Actaea rubra, red baneberry
- Adonis aestivalis, summer adonis
- Anemone canadensis, Canada anemone
- Anemone cylindrica, long-fruited anemone
- Anemone drummondii, Little Belt Mountain thimbleweed
- Anemone multifida, Pacific anemone
- Anemone nuttalliana, prairie-crocus
- Anemone parviflora, small-flower anemone
- Anemone piperi, Piper's anemone
- Aquilegia brevistyla, short-styled columbine
- Aquilegia coerulea, Colorado columbine
- Aquilegia flavescens, yellow columbine
- Aquilegia formosa, Sitka columbine
- Aquilegia jonesi, Jones' columbine
- Caltha leptosepala, white marsh-marigold
- Clematis columbiana, purple virgin's-bower
- Clematis hirsutissima, sugarbowls
- Clematis ligusticifolia, western virgin's-bower
- Clematis occidentalis, purple clematis
- Coptis occidentalis, western goldthread
- Delphinium ajacis, doubtful knight's-spur
- Delphinium andersonii, Anderson's larkspur
- Delphinium bicolor, limestone larkspur
- Delphinium burkei, meadow larkspur
- Delphinium depauperatum, slim larkspur
- Delphinium geyeri, Geyer's larkspur
- Delphinium glaucescens, Electric Peak larkspur
- Delphinium glaucum, pale larkspur
- Delphinium nuttallianum, Nuttall's larkspur
- Delphinium occidentale, tall larkspur
- Myosurus apetalus, bristly mousetail
- Myosurus minimus, eastern mousetail
- Pulsatilla nuttalliana, pasqueflower
- Pulsatilla occidentalis(syn. Anemone occidentalis), western pasqueflower
- Ranunculus abortivus, kidneyleaf buttercup
- Ranunculus acriformis, sharpleaf buttercup
- Ranunculus acris, tall buttercup
- Ranunculus adoneus, western wild buttercup
- Ranunculus alismifolius, plantainleaf buttercup
- Ranunculus aquatilis, white water buttercup
- Ranunculus cardiophyllus, heart-leaved buttercup
- Ranunculus cymbalaria, alkali buttercup
- Ranunculus eschscholtzii, Eschscholtz's buttercup
- Ranunculus flammula, lesser spearwort
- Ranunculus glaberrimus, sagebrush buttercup
- Ranunculus gmelinii, small yellow buttercup
- Ranunculus grayi, arctic buttercup
- Ranunculus hyperboreus, high-arctic buttercup
- Ranunculus inamoenu, graceful buttercup
- Ranunculus jovis, potential Jove's buttercup
- Ranunculus macounii, Macoun's buttercup
- Ranunculus orthorhynchus, straightbeak buttercup
- Ranunculus pedatifidus, northern buttercup
- Ranunculus pensylvanicus, bristly crowfoot
- Ranunculus populago, mountain buttercup
- Ranunculus pygmaeus, dwarf buttercup
- Ranunculus repens, creeping buttercup
- Ranunculus rhomboideus, prairie buttercup
- Ranunculus sceleratus, cursed buttercup
- Ranunculus testiculatus, curveseed butterwort
- Ranunculus uncinatus, woodland buttercup
- Thalictrum alpinum, alpine meadowrue
- Thalictrum dasycarpum, purple meadowrue
- Thalictrum fendleri, Fendler's meadowrue
- Thalictrum occidentale, western meadowrue
- Thalictrum sparsiflorum, few-flower meadowrue
- Thalictrum venulosum, veined meadowrue
- Trautvetteria caroliniensis, Carolina tassel-rue
- Trollius laxus, spreading globeflower

== See also ==
- List of dicotyledons of Montana
