= Bristly buttercup =

Bristly buttercup is a common name for several plants and may refer to:

- Ranunculus hispidus
- Ranunculus pensylvanicus, native to North America
