= Bugbane =

Bugbane is a common name for several plants and it may refer to:

- Actaea
- Trautvetteria
