= Adoneus =

Adoneus may refer to:

- Adoneus, the Latin name of an adonic, a unit of Aeolic verse
- Adoneus, a Latinised name of the Greek god Adonis
- Adoneus, a Latin epithet of the Greek god Dionysus
- Ranunculus adoneus, a species of flowering plant
