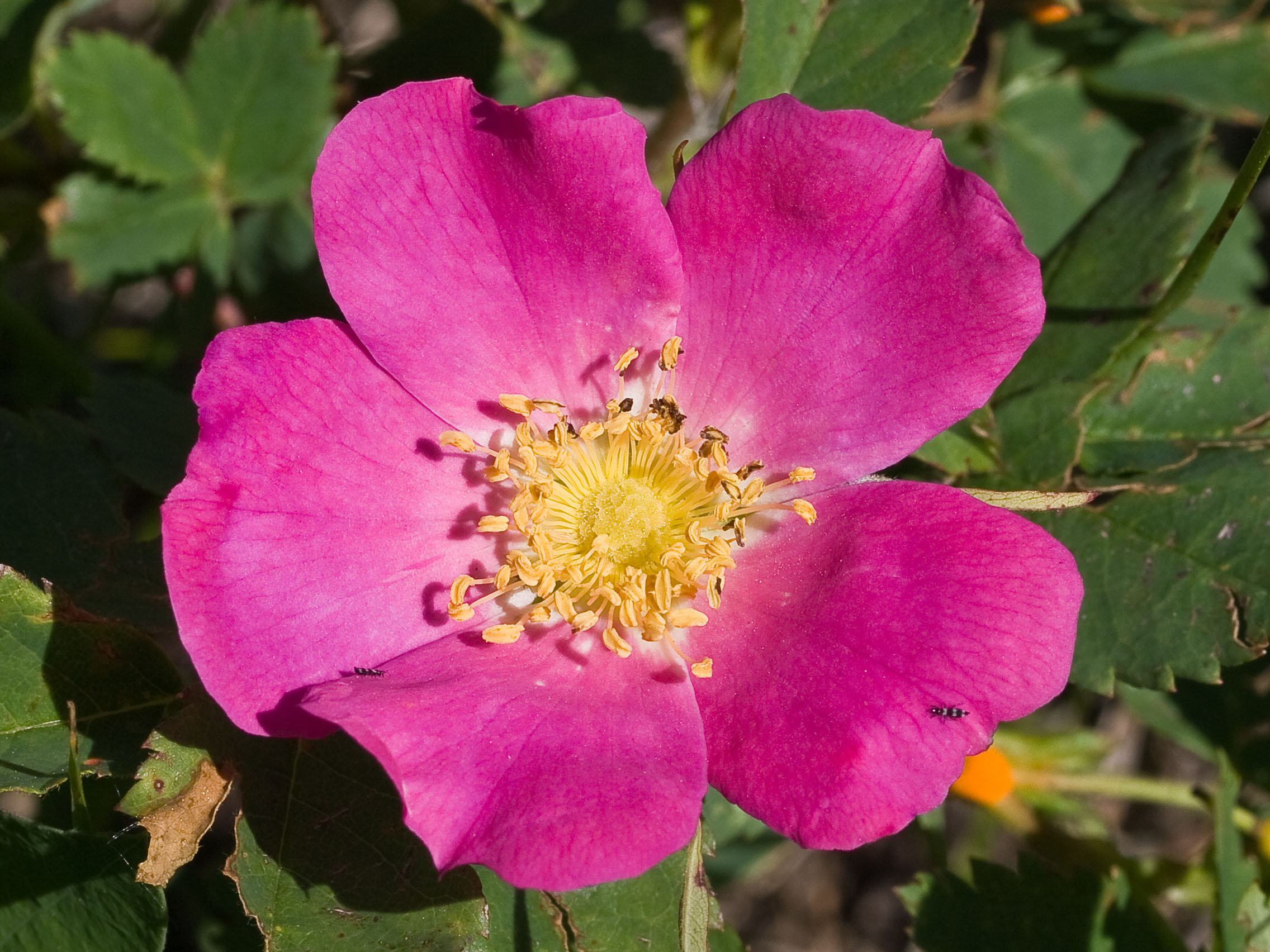
- Closeup of flower

Conservation status
- Secure (NatureServe)

Scientific classification
- Kingdom: Plantae
- Clade: Tracheophytes
- Clade: Angiosperms
- Clade: Eudicots
- Clade: Rosids
- Order: Rosales
- Family: Rosaceae
- Genus: Rosa
- Species: R. woodsii

Binomial name
- Rosa woodsii Lindl.

= Rosa woodsii =

Species of flowering plant

Rosa woodsii is a species of wild rose known by the common names Woods' rose, interior rose, common wild rose, mountain rose, pear-hip rose, and prairie rose.

== Description ==
Rosa woodsii is a perennial bushy shrub which grows up to 3 metres (10 feet) tall. The shrubs can form large, dense thickets. The plant reproduces sexually by seed and vegetatively by sprouting from the root crown, layering, and by producing root suckers.

The stems are straight, red to grey-brown and studded with prickles. The deciduous leaves are each made up of several widely spaced sharp-toothed leaflets up to 5 centimetres (2 inches) long.

The inflorescence is a cyme of up to a few fragrant flowers with five petals in any shade of pink and measuring up to 2.5 cm in length. Flowers bloom between May and July and have many stamens and pistils. The fruit is a red rose hip which may be over 1 cm long and matures in August to September. They can be eaten, used in tea or as medicine.

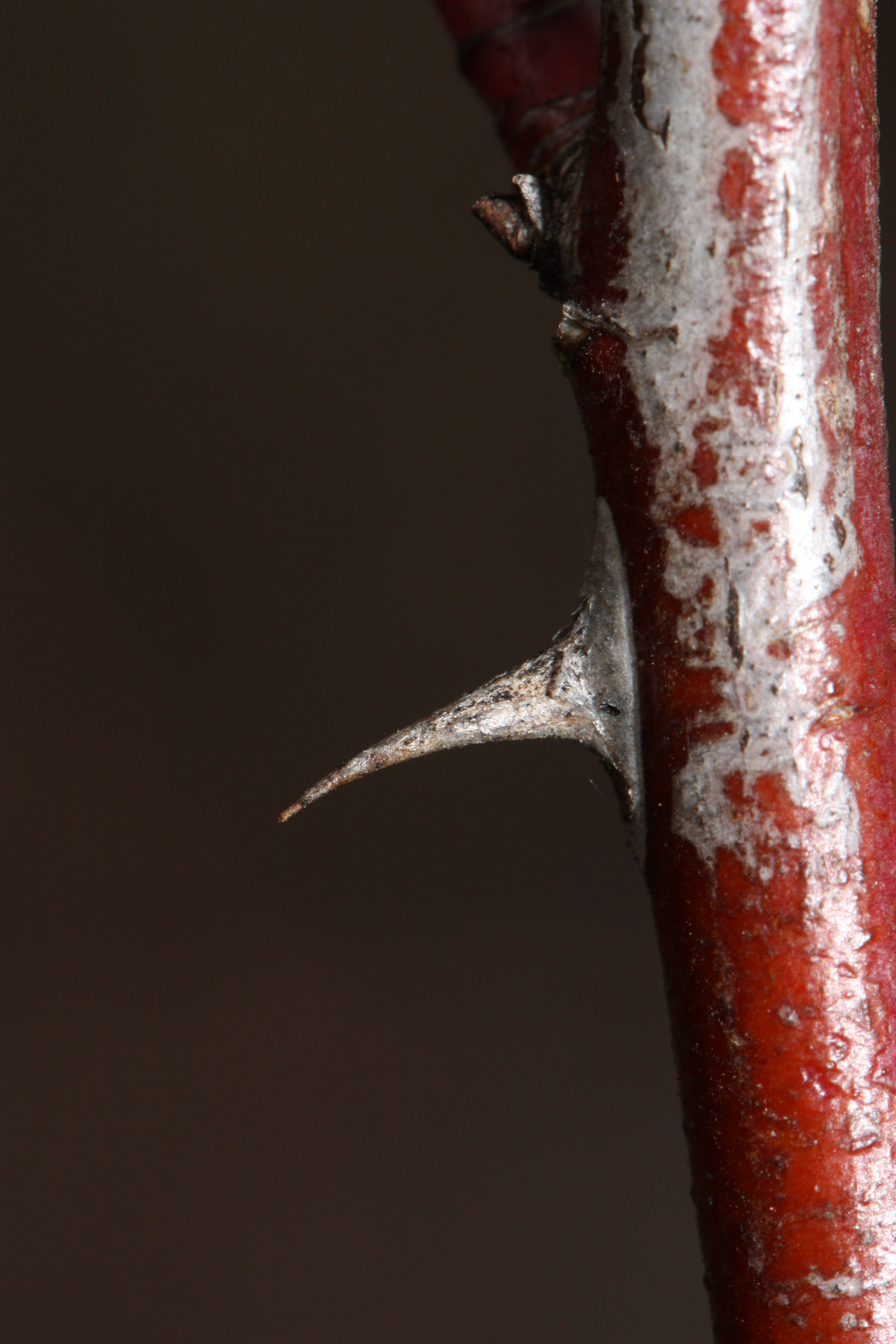
Prickle (closeup)

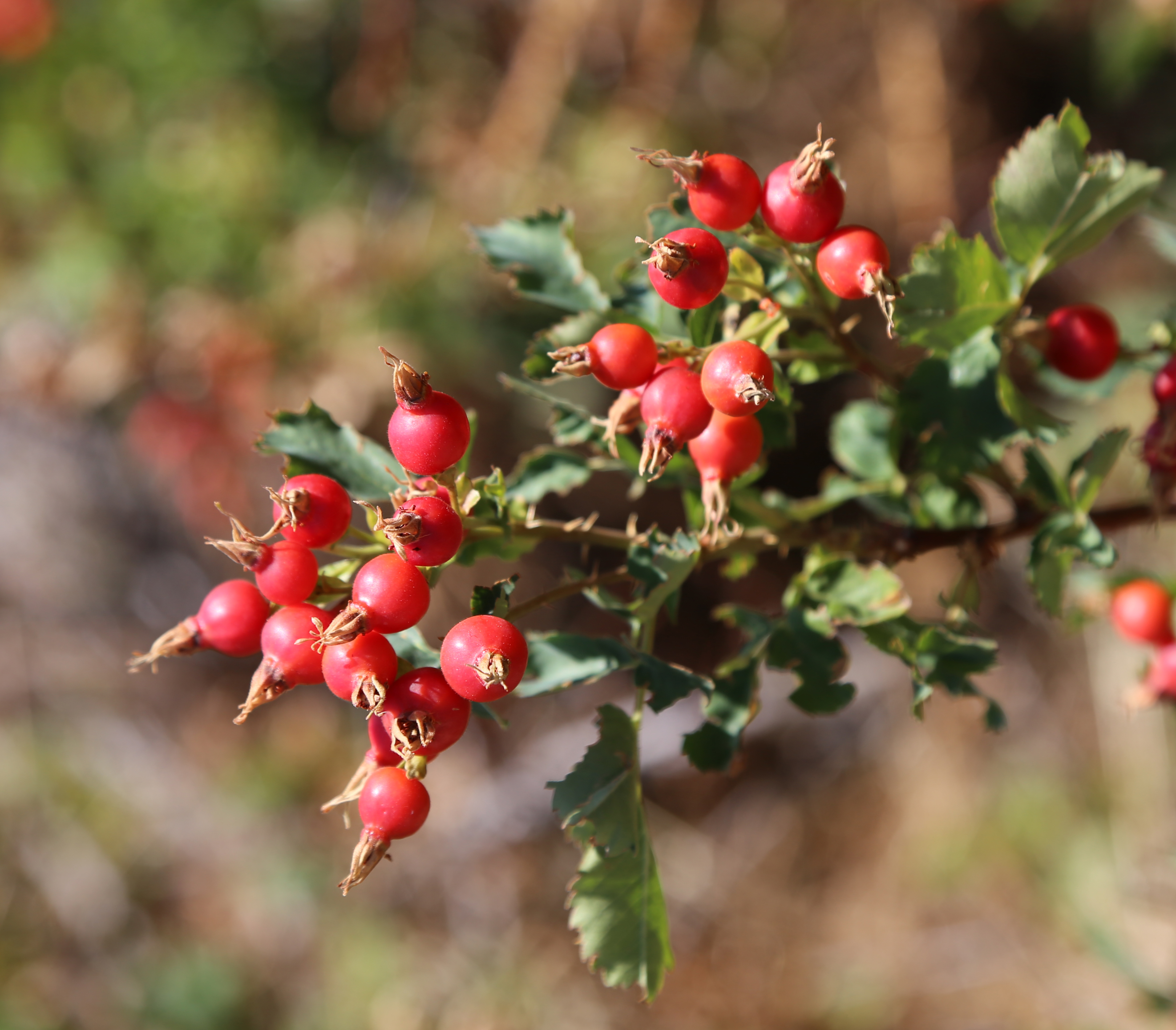
Rose hips of Rosa woodsii

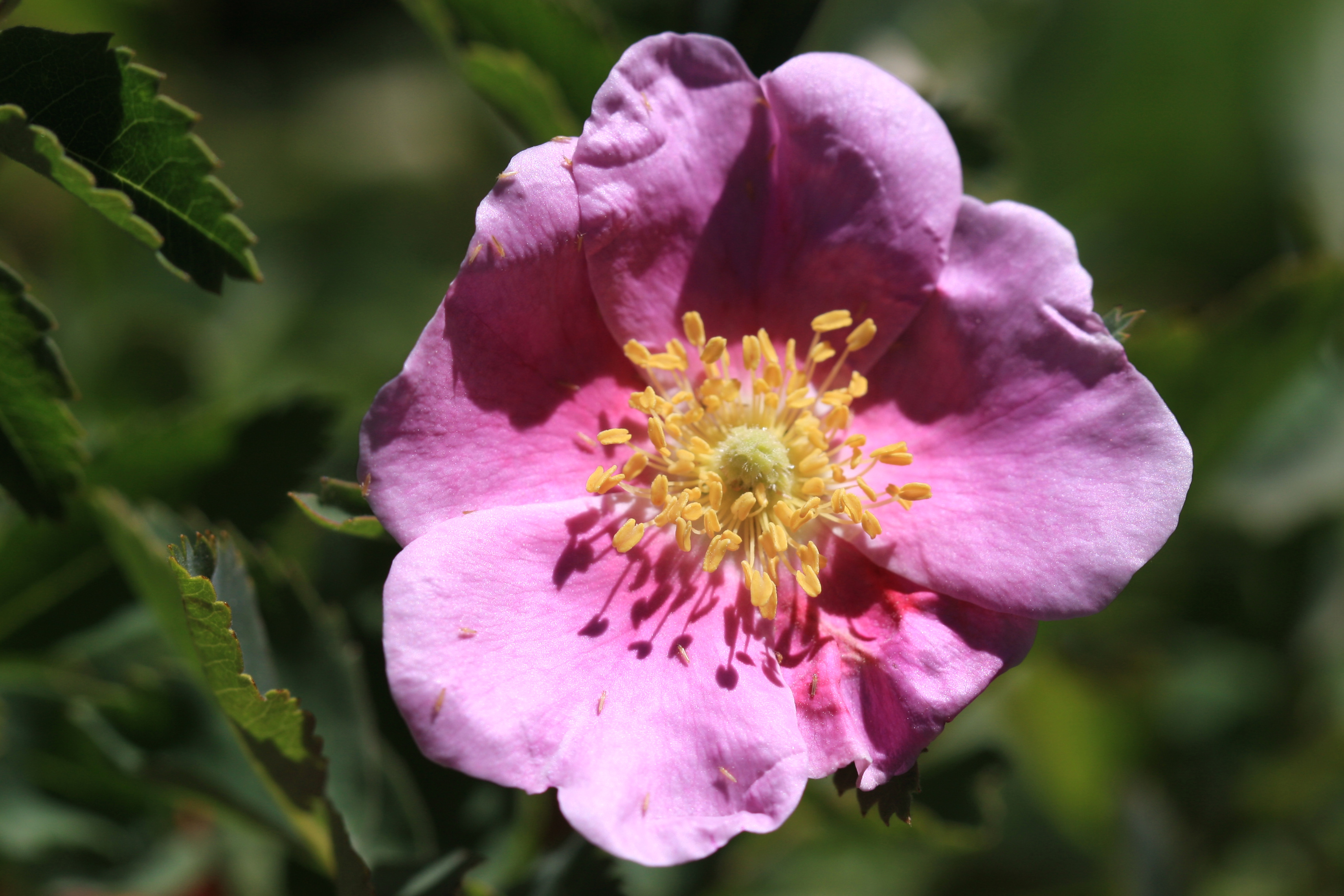
Lighter pink flower, at 7,000 ft (2,100 m) in the Eastern Sierra

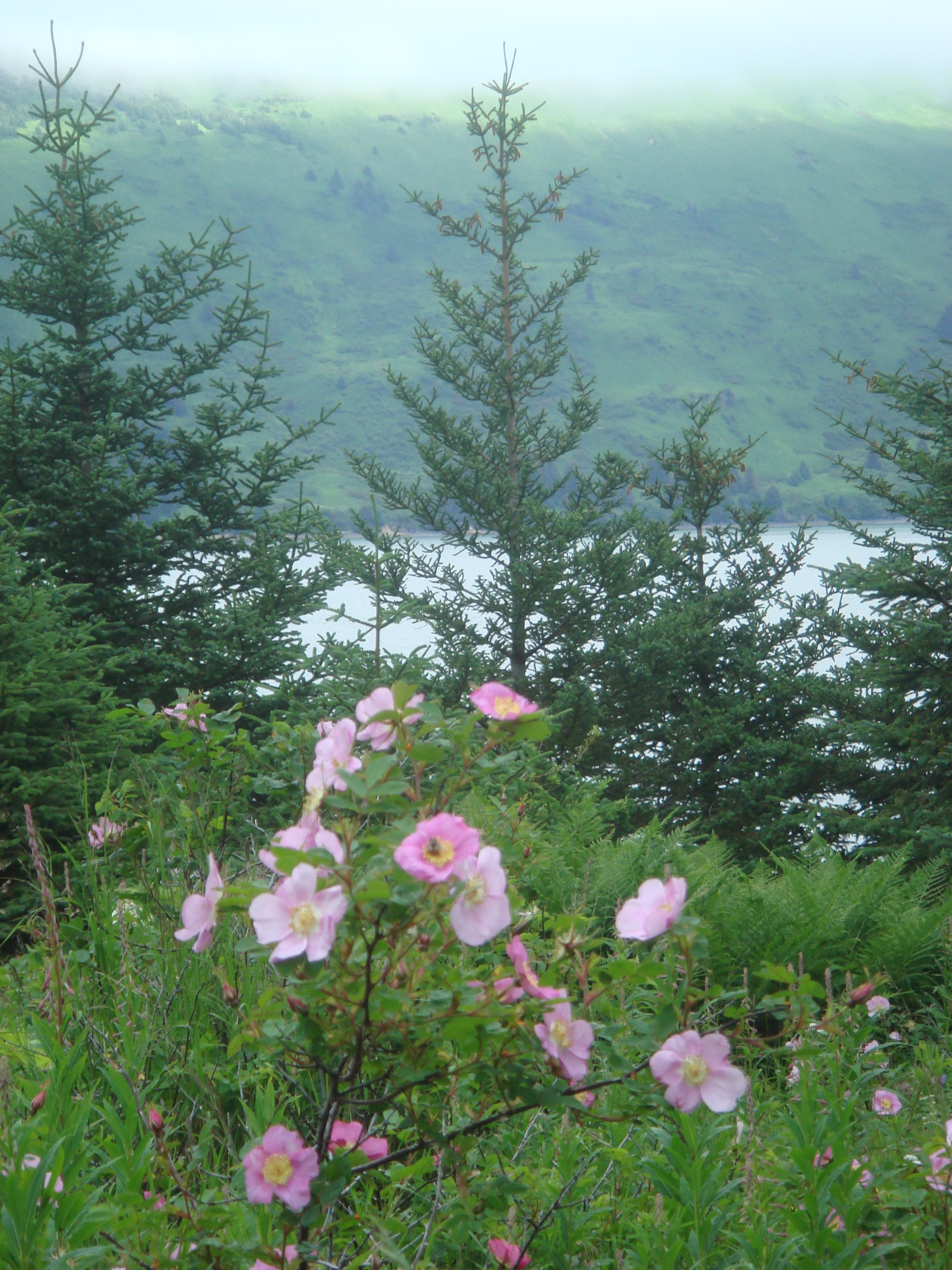
Rosa woodsii on Raspberry Island (Alaska)

== Distribution and habitat ==
It is native to North America including much of Canada and Alaska and the western and central United States. It grows in a variety of habitats such as open woods, plains, stream banks, stony slopes and disturbed areas.

In the Sierra Nevada, it grows to 3,400 m (11,200 ft) in moist, rocky soils in mixed coniferous forest, upper montane forest, and subalpine forest.

== In culture ==
The flower was featured as one of four different wildflowers on U.S. postage stamps issued in 2022 alongside alpine buttercup, wood lily, and pasqueflower.
