= Trautvetteria palmata =

Scientific classification
- Kingdom: Plantae
- Clade: Embryophytes
- Clade: Tracheophytes
- Clade: Spermatophytes
- Clade: Angiosperms
- Clade: Eudicots
- Order: Ranunculales
- Family: Ranunculaceae
- Genus: Trautvetteria
- Species: T. palmata

Binomial name
- Trautvetteria palmata (Michx.) Fisch. & C.A.Mey.

Synonyms
- Of the species: List: Actaea palmata (Michx.) DC.; Cimicifuga palmata Michx.; Oxygraphis palmata (Michx.) Lonay; Thalictrum palmatum (Michx.) Walter ex Spreng.; Of var. palmata: List: Actaea racemosa Walter ex Steud.; Ranunculus pleurocarpus Maxim.; Thalictrum ranunculinum Muhl. ex Willd.; Thalictrum vitifolium Schltdl. ex Ledeb., not validly publ.; Trautvetteria caroliniensis var. japonica (Siebold & Zucc.) Makino; Trautvetteria japonica Siebold & Zucc.; Trautvetteria palmata var. japonica (Siebold & Zucc.) Huth; Trautvetteria palmata var. minor H.Lév.

Species of flowering plant

Trautvetteria palmata is a species of flowering plant in the family Ranunculaceae, native to regions from the Russian Far East to Japan. It was first described by André Michaux in 1803 as Cimicifuga palmata.

== Varieties ==
As of March 2024, Plants of the World Online accepted two varieties:

- Trautvetteria palmata var. borealis (H.Hara) Kadota
- Trautvetteria palmata var. palmata
