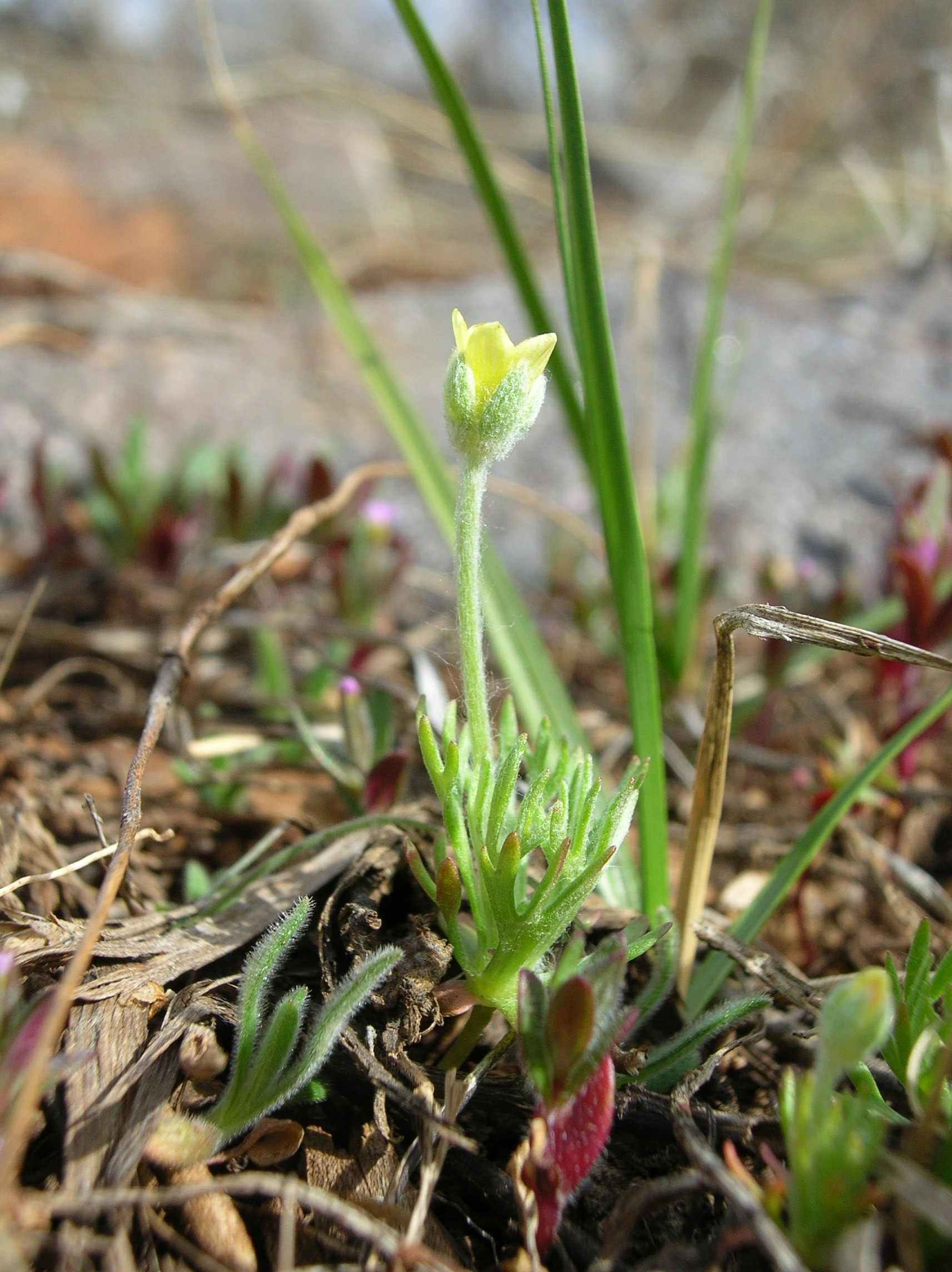
- Ceratocephala testiculata

Scientific classification
- Kingdom: Plantae
- Clade: Tracheophytes
- Clade: Angiosperms
- Clade: Eudicots
- Order: Ranunculales
- Family: Ranunculaceae
- Subfamily: Ranunculoideae
- Tribe: Ranunculeae
- Genus: Ceratocephala; Moench

Species
- Ceratocephala caulifolia Ceratocephala falcata Ceratocephala furfurascens Ceratocephala pungens Ceratocephala testiculata

= Ceratocephala (plant) =

Genus of flowering plants

Ceratocephala is a flowering plant genus in the family Ranunculaceae.
