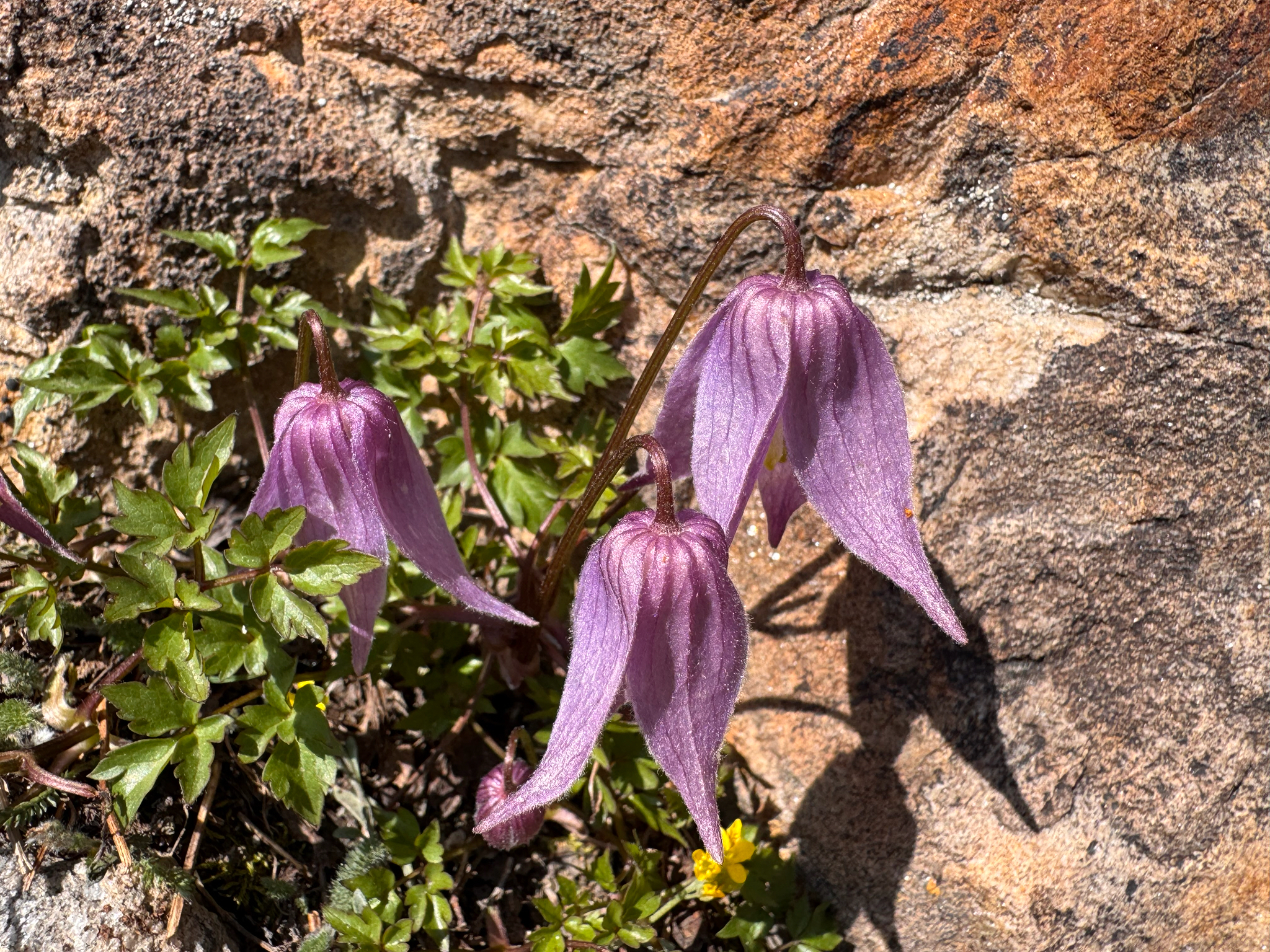
- Variety tenuiloba flowering

Conservation status
- Secure (NatureServe)

Scientific classification
- Kingdom: Plantae
- Clade: Embryophytes
- Clade: Tracheophytes
- Clade: Angiosperms
- Clade: Eudicots
- Order: Ranunculales
- Family: Ranunculaceae
- Genus: Clematis
- Species: C. columbiana

Binomial name
- Clematis columbiana (Nutt.) Torr. & A.Gray

Varieties
- C. c. var. columbiana; C. c. var. tenuiloba

Synonyms
- List: Atragene columbiana; Atragene columbiana var. tenuiloba; Atragene diversiloba; Atragene pseudoalpina; Atragene pseudoalpina var. diversiloba; Atragene repens; Atragene tenuiloba; Clematis alpina var. repens; Clematis alpina var. tenuiloba; Clematis alpina subvar. tenuiloba; Clematis occidentalis var. albiflora; Clematis pinetorum; Clematis pseudoalpina; Clematis pseudoalpina var. tenuiloba; Clematis pseudoatragene; Clematis pseudoatragene subsp. pseudoalpina; Clematis pseudoatragene subsp. subtriternata; Clematis pseudoatragene subsp. wenderothioides; Clematis tenuiloba; Clematis verticillaris var. columbiana

= Clematis columbiana =

Plant species in the family

Clematis columbiana, the Rocky Mountain clematis, is a species in the buttercup family from the western United States.

== Description ==
Rock clematis can be a vine which climbs up other plants for support or dangles to having rhizomatous stems that are almost entirely underground. In viney plant the stems will usually be 0.5–1.5 meters (1.5–5 ft) long, but can occasionally reach 3.5 m (11.5 ft). In the colonies of rhizomatous plants the aboveground portion of the stems will usually be less than 10 cm (4 in), though can occasionally be as much as 1.5 m. The stems range from hairless to covered in long hairs and are typically woody.

The leaves are compound and twice or three times divided, but the leaflets are quite variable in shape. Most often the leaflets are lanceolate to ovate with two or three deep lobes, nearly dividing it entirely. Each of the leaflets is usually 1.5–4.8 centimeters (0.6–1.9 in) and just 0.8–3.5 cm wide. The leaves can be entirely hairless, or have a few long hairs along the midveins.

The flowers have four, delicate, purple-blue to occasionally clearly blue petal-like sepals. Each 2.5 to 6 cm (1–2.5 in) long and lance-ovate to ovate. Overall they are bell-shaped and nodding and solitary on short side shoots with two leaves or, rarely, at the end of a long stem.

It is very similar to western virgin's bower, but Rocky Mountain clematis twice or three times compound leaves where its relative has leaves that are divided into just three leaflets. Wild hybrids of the two species have been reliably documented in Montana.

== Taxonomy ==
In 1834 Thomas Nuttall described a new species which he named Atragene columbiana. In 1838 John Torrey and Asa Gray moved the species to Clematis, giving it the accepted name of Clematis columbiana. However, as late as the 1980s some botanists, such as William Alfred Weber, preferred the earlier classification in Atragene. According to the Flora of North America (FNA), it is part of subgenus Atragene which is classified in the Ranunculaceae family. The species has two accepted varieties.

- Clematis columbiana var. columbiana – Native to the central US from Montana to Texas
- Clematis columbiana var. tenuiloba – Native from North Dakota to New Mexico

Clematis columbiana has 20 synonyms of the species or one of its two varieties, including nine species names.

Table of Synonyms
Name	Year	Synonym of:	Notes
Atragene columbiana Nutt.	1834	C. columbiana	≡ hom.
Atragene diversiloba (Rydb.) Rydb.	1906	var. columbiana	= het.
Atragene pseudoalpina (Kuntze) Rydb.	1902	var. columbiana	= het.
Atragene repens (Kuntze) Rydb.	1902	var. columbiana	= het.
Atragene tenuiloba (A.Gray) Britton	1895	var. tenuiloba	≡ hom.
Clematis pinetorum Tidestr.	1941	var. columbiana	= het.
Clematis pseudoalpina (Kuntze) A.Nelson	1909	var. columbiana	= het.
Clematis pseudoatragene Kuntze	1885	var. columbiana	= het.
Clematis tenuiloba (A.Gray) C.L.Hitchc.	1964	var. tenuiloba	≡ hom.
Notes: ≡ homotypic synonym; = heterotypic synonym

=== Names ===
The species name, columbiana, references the Columbia River. It is known by the common names Rocky Mountain clematis, rock clematis, Columbia clematis, Columbian virgin's-bower, and bellrue. It is also called blue clematis, however this may cause confusion as its color is somewhat purple or mauve and the similar Clematis occidentalis is also sometimes known by this name.

== Range and habitat ==
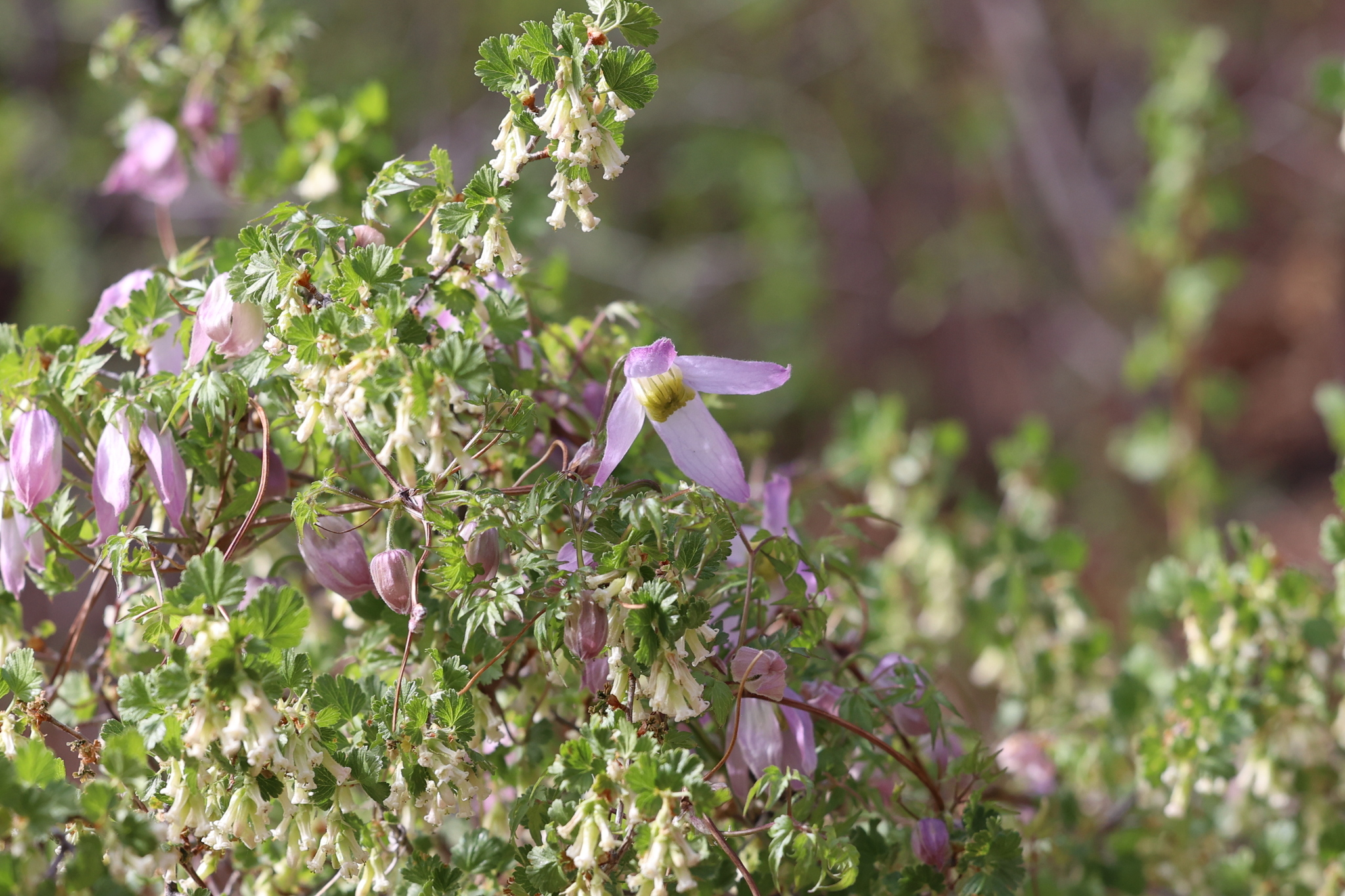
Santa Fe National Forest, New Mexico

According to Plants of the World Online Rocky Mountain clematis is native mainly to the Rocky Mountain states from Idaho to New Mexico, but also grows in Texas, Arizona, and the Dakotas. In Arizona it is limited to northern and eastern parts of the state, listed as Coconino, Navajo, Apache, and Greenlee counties. The range in New Mexico is in the north and in Texas it is limited to the northwest. To the north in Colorado it grows in the central mountains and the west while in Utah it grows in the south and east of the state. In Wyoming it is mostly found in the north of the state. However, it also grows in the east in the Black Hills and crosses over into South Dakota. There and in the Killdeer Mountains in North Dakota only variety tenuiloba is found unlike much of the rest of the range where both are found and plants halfway between the two varieties occur. In Montana it is found in the western half of the state, but is only rarely recorded in far west. Variety columbiana is reported in Idaho by the FNA, but there is disagreement on if the species extends to the west into Oregon and Washington. The species can be found at elevations as low as 1,000 meters (3,300 ft) for variety tenuiloba and as high as 3,200 meters (10,500 ft) for variety columbiana.

The species is grows in rocky areas, both in thickets and open woods, with variety tenuiloba also found on cliffsides and open habitats atop mountains or hills. They are associated with pine forests, stream and riversides, mountain grasslands, pinyon–juniper woodlands, Rocky Mountain ponderosa pine forests, aspen groves, and spruce-fir forests.
