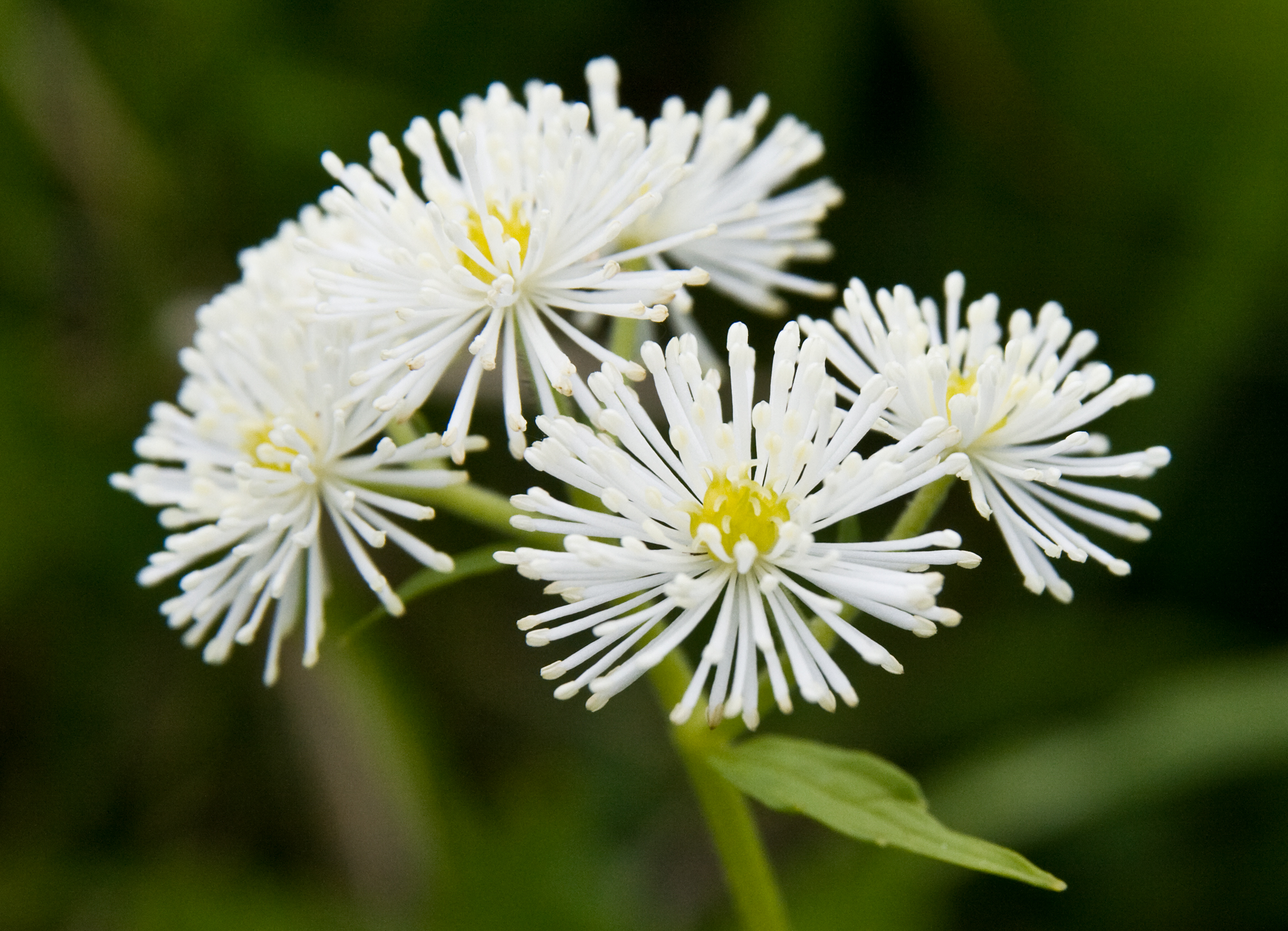
- Trautvetteria caroliniensis

Scientific classification
- Kingdom: Plantae
- Clade: Tracheophytes
- Clade: Angiosperms
- Clade: Eudicots
- Order: Ranunculales
- Family: Ranunculaceae
- Genus: Trautvetteria; Fisch. & C.A.Mey.

Species
- See text.

= Trautvetteria =

Genus of plants

Trautvetteria is a genus of flowering plant in the family Ranunculaceae, native from the Russian Far East to Japan, and to the southwestern and south central United States and Mexico. The genus was established in 1835.

== Species ==
As of April 2026, Plants of the World Online accepted the following species:

- Trautvetteria applanata Greene
- Trautvetteria caroliniensis (Walter) Vail
- Trautvetteria fonticalcarea Floden
- Trautvetteria grandis Nutt.
- Trautvetteria palmata (Michx.) Fisch. & C.A.Mey.
