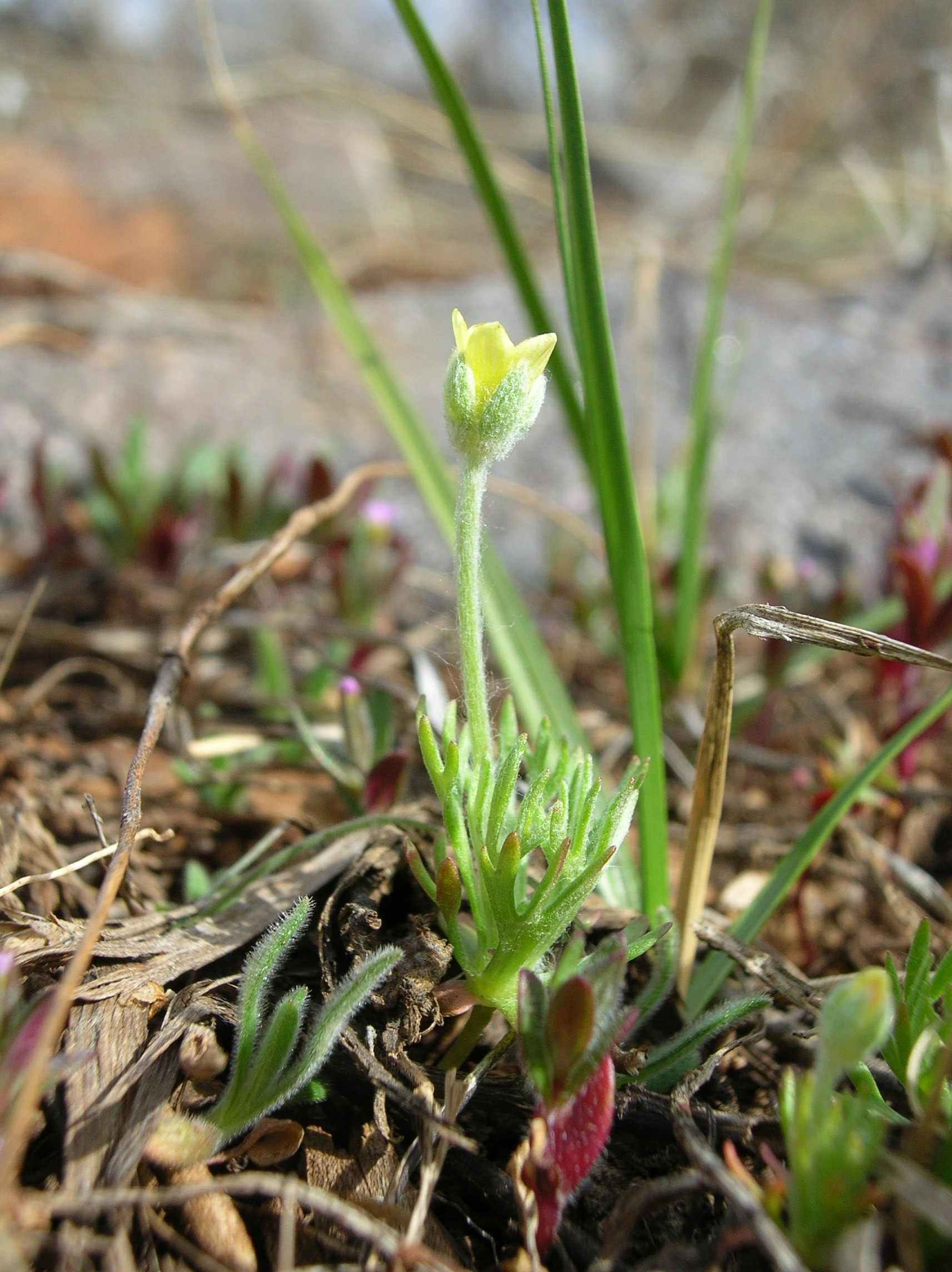

Scientific classification
- Kingdom: Plantae
- Clade: Tracheophytes
- Clade: Angiosperms
- Clade: Eudicots
- Order: Ranunculales
- Family: Ranunculaceae
- Genus: Ceratocephala
- Species: C. testiculata

Binomial name
- Ceratocephala testiculata (Crantz) Roth

Synonyms
- Ceratocephala orthoceras DC.; Ranunculus testiculatus Crantz (basionym)

= Ceratocephala testiculata =

Species of flowering plant

Ceratocephala testiculata (syn. Ceratocephala orthoceras, Ranunculus testiculatus) is a flowering plant that is native to Eurasia. Common names include bur buttercup and curveseed butterwort. It is very small, usually only about an inch or two tall, but potentially growing to four inches. The flowers are small and dull yellow. The leaves are hairy and somewhat dissected. It produces a cluster of hard, spiny fruits (the 'burs'). Like other members of the buttercup family, they are poisonous. Where they are present in large numbers, it is usually an indication of excessive disturbance to the land.

The species is considered to be invasive in the northern and western United States. In the sagebrush country, it is one of the first plants to flower after the snow melts.

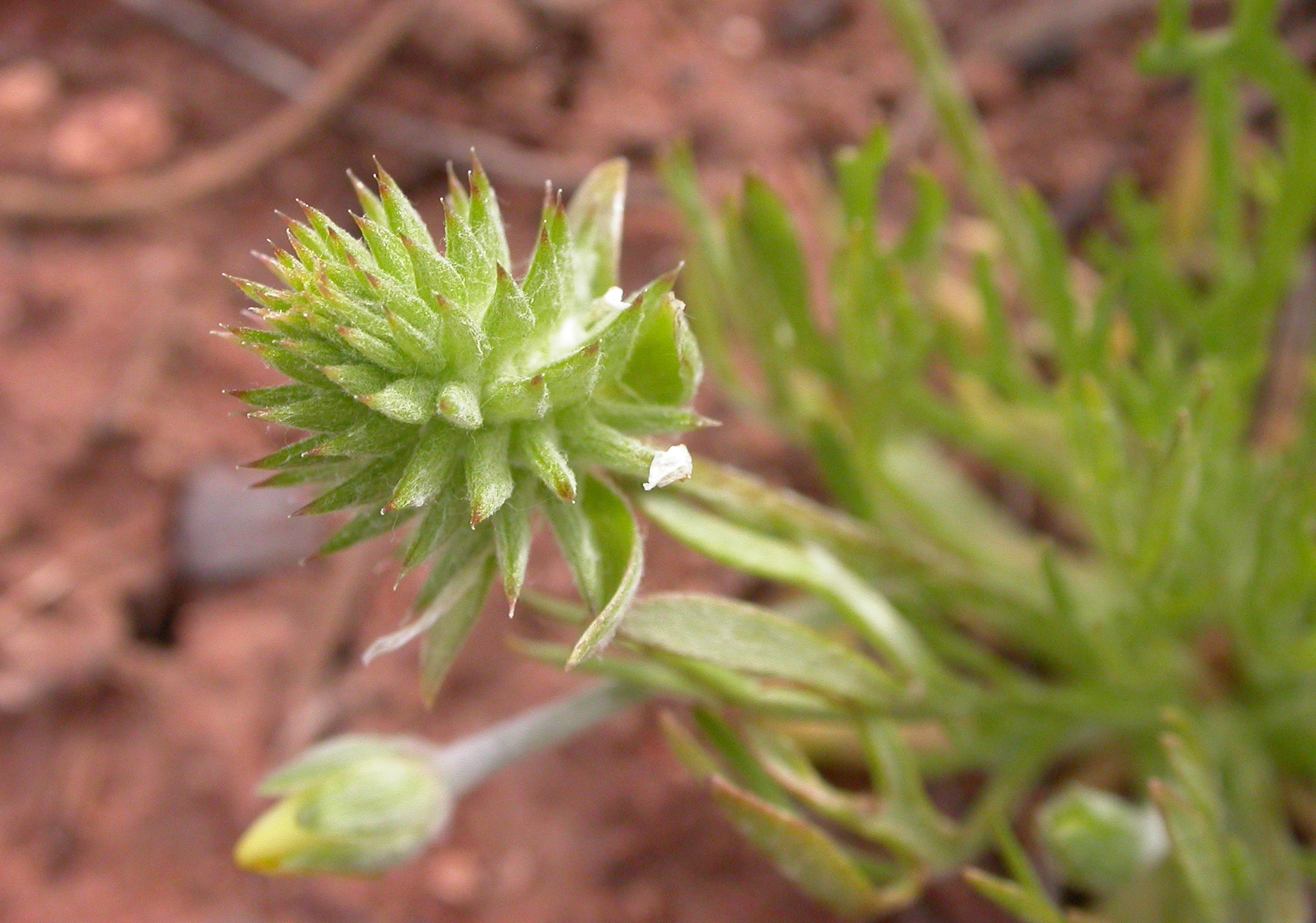
Closeup of fruits
