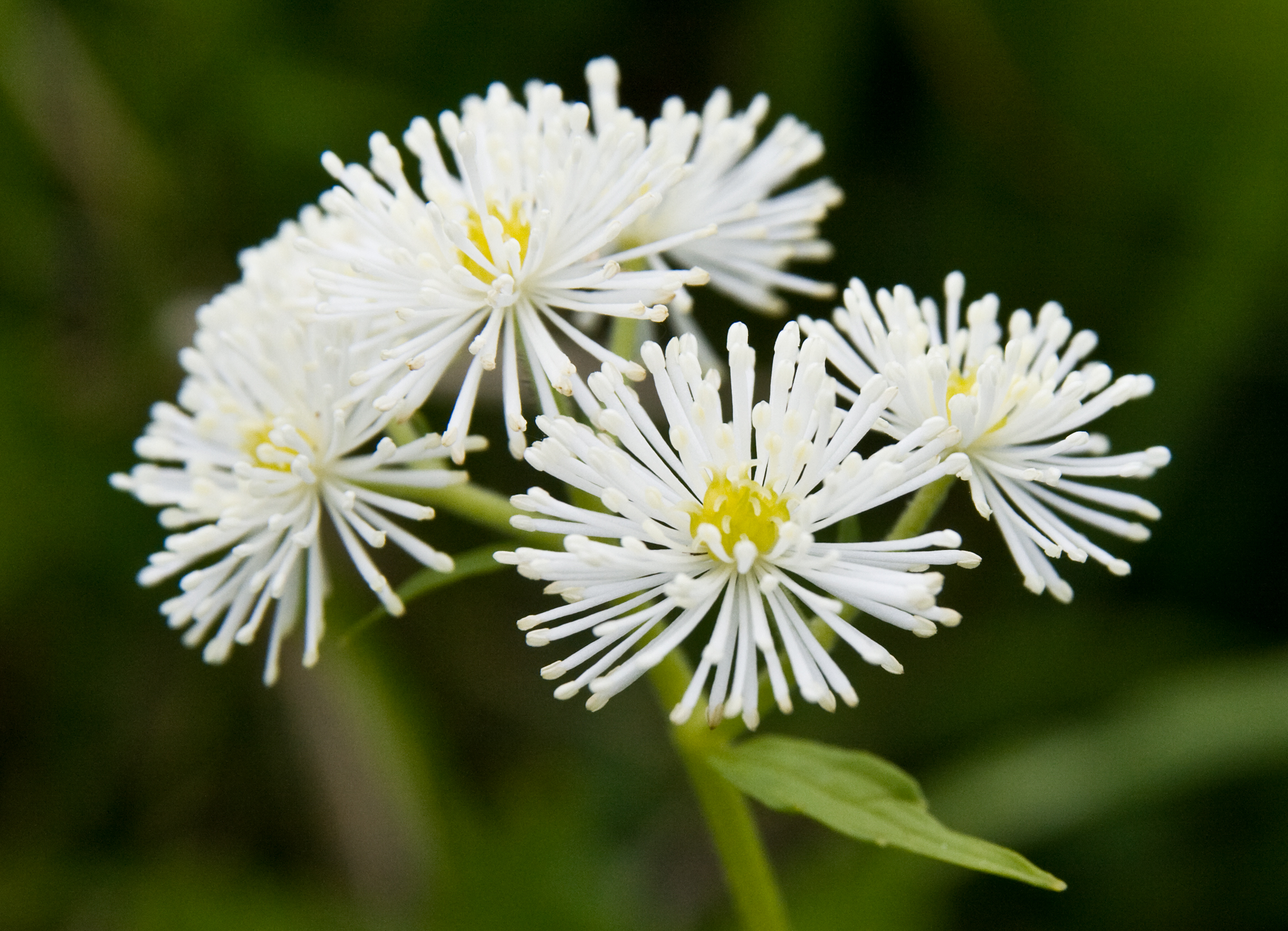

Conservation status
- Secure (NatureServe)

Scientific classification
- Kingdom: Plantae
- Clade: Tracheophytes
- Clade: Angiosperms
- Clade: Eudicots
- Order: Ranunculales
- Family: Ranunculaceae
- Genus: Trautvetteria
- Species: T. caroliniensis

Binomial name
- Trautvetteria caroliniensis (Walter) Vail

Synonyms
- Actaea grandis (Nutt.) D.Dietr.; Hydrastis canadensis Poir.; Hydrastis carolinensis Walter; Trautvetteria applanata Greene; Trautvetteria caroliniensis var. coriacea (Huth) K.C.Davis; Trautvetteria caroliniensis var. occidentalis (A.Gray) C.L.Hitchc.; Trautvetteria fimbriata Greene; Trautvetteria grandis Nutt.; Trautvetteria media Greene; Trautvetteria nervata Greene; Trautvetteria palmata var. coriacea Huth; Trautvetteria rotundata Greene; Trautvetteria saniculifolia Greene

= Trautvetteria caroliniensis =

Species of flowering plant

Trautvetteria caroliniensis is a species of flowering plant in the family Ranunculaceae native to North America. It is known by the common names Carolina bugbane, false bugbane, and tassel-rue. The genus is named for the botanist Ernst Rudolf von Trautvetter.

This plant is native to Asia and eastern and western North America. It grows in moist wooded areas and other habitat. It is a rhizomatous perennial herb producing an erect stem up to 1.5 meters (4 ft 11 in) in maximum height. The large leaf has a palmate blade up to 30 or 40 centimeters (12 or 16 in) wide with deeply divided, pointed, toothed lobes. The blade is borne on a long, slender petiole which may measure up to 45 centimeters (18 in) long. The leaf is green, darker on top and paler underneath. The inflorescence is a panicle with several clusters of flowers on branches. The flower has no petals and is mostly made up of many long, white stamens each up to a centimeter long. At the center is a spherical cluster of green pistils. This develops into a spherical cluster of green fruits.

The plant contains protoanemonin, which may cause blistering or skin irritation.

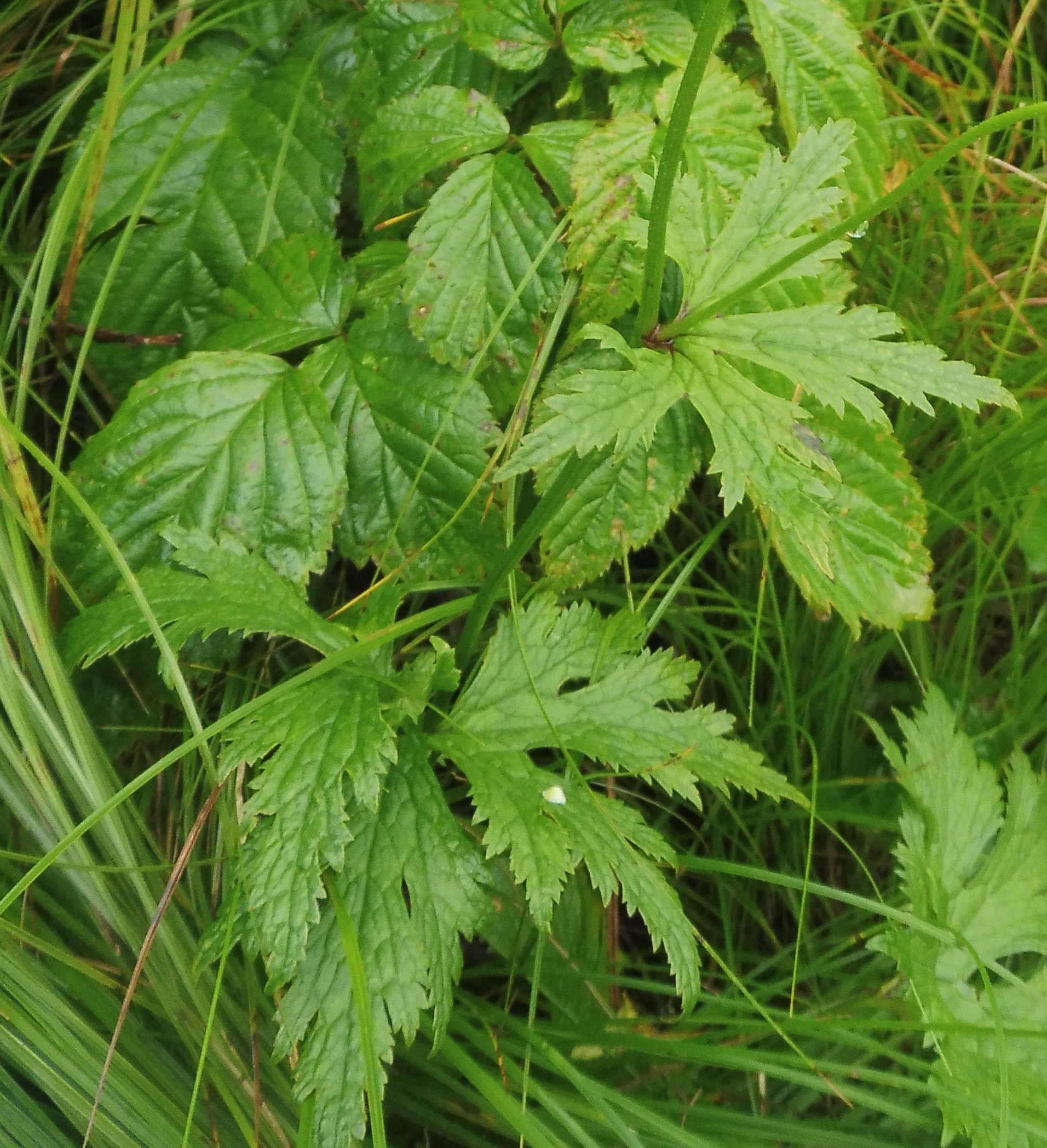
Stem leaves are deeply lobed (background leaves are Rubus)
