= Ranunculus populago =

Scientific classification
- Kingdom: Plantae
- Clade: Tracheophytes
- Clade: Angiosperms
- Clade: Eudicots
- Order: Ranunculales
- Family: Ranunculaceae
- Genus: Ranunculus
- Species: R. populago

Binomial name
- Ranunculus populago Greene

Species of buttercup

Ranunculus populago is a species of buttercup known by the common names popular buttercup and mountain buttercup. It is native to the Pacific Northwest and surrounding areas in the United States, where it grows in wet habitat, such as bogs, streambanks, and moist mountain meadows. It is a perennial herb producing an upright, mostly hairless stem reaching up to about 30 centimeters in height. Leaves have oval blades borne on long petioles. The flower usually has five or six shiny yellow petals each a few millimeters long around a central nectary and many stamens and pistils. The fruit is an achene borne in a spherical cluster.
