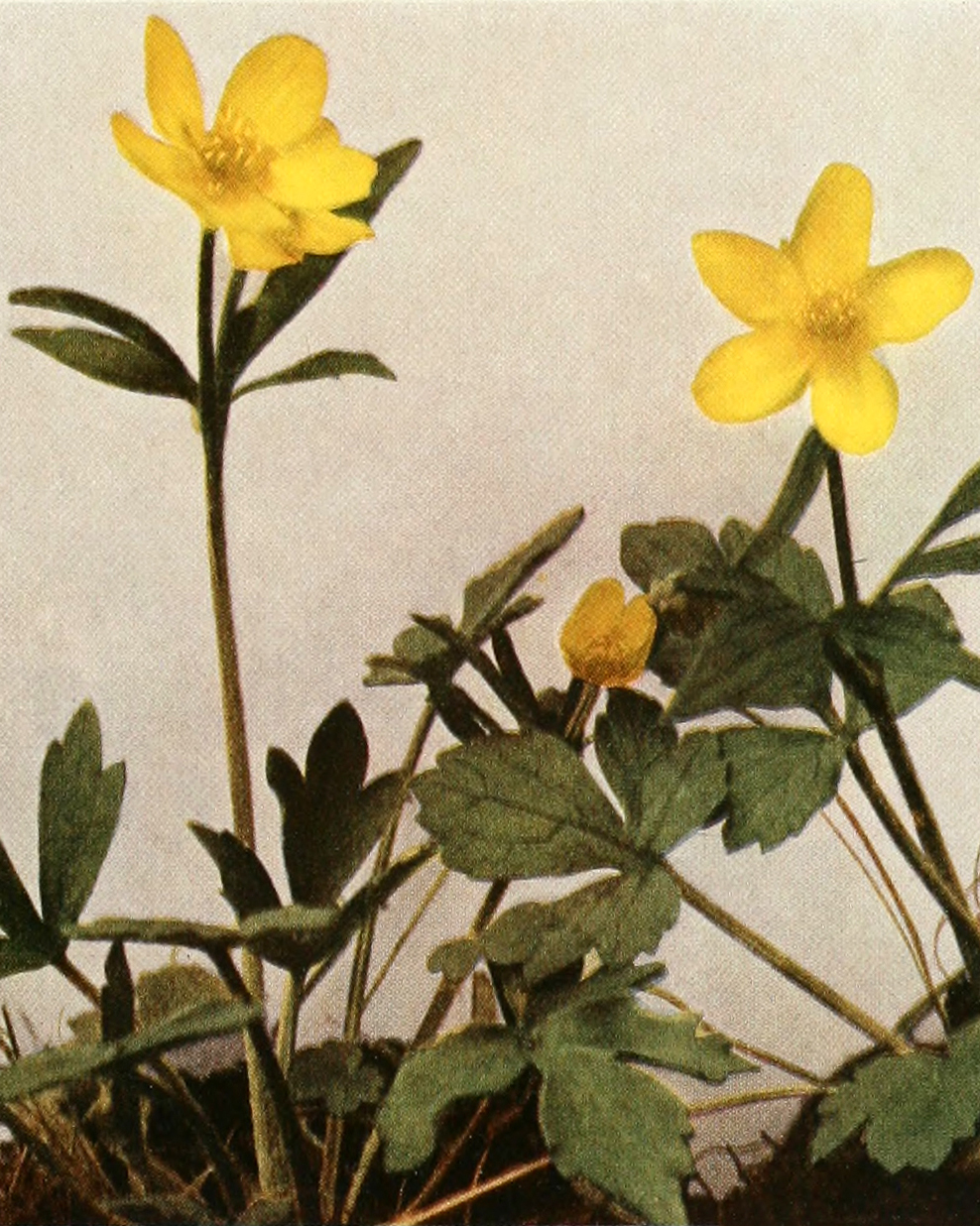
- Ranunculus hispidus var. hispidus

Conservation status
- Secure (NatureServe)

Scientific classification
- Kingdom: Plantae
- Clade: Tracheophytes
- Clade: Angiosperms
- Clade: Eudicots
- Order: Ranunculales
- Family: Ranunculaceae
- Genus: Ranunculus
- Species: R. hispidus

Binomial name
- Ranunculus hispidus Michx., 1803

= Ranunculus hispidus =

Species of flowering plant

Ranunculus hispidus is a species of perennial flowering plant in the buttercup family, Ranunculaceae. It is commonly known as bristly buttercup or hispid buttercup. It is a small plant native to central and eastern North America that grows to a height up to 30 cm (1 ft) and has 5-petaled yellow flowers.

== Description ==
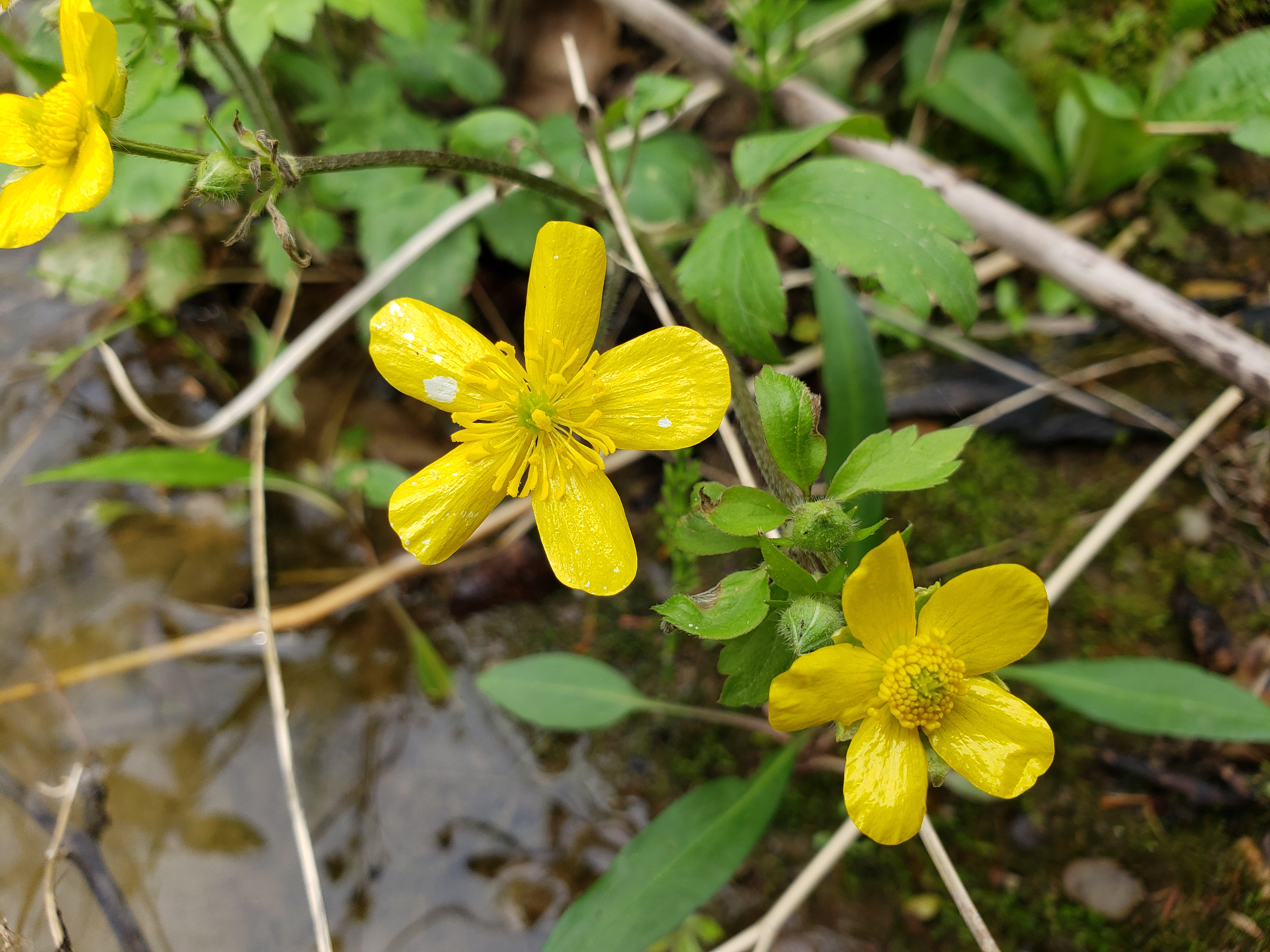
Flower

R. hispidus has upright stems growing up to 30 cm (1 ft) tall, with a tendency to sprawl as it ages. It has light green to pale reddish brown stems that have long spreading hairs. The plant has both basal leaves and alternate leaves on the stem. The basal leaves have long petioles, and the leaves on the stem are smaller and have shorter petioles higher up on the stem. The leaves are variable, with some being compound with 3 leaflets, sometimes wider than they are long. Each leaflet is coarsely toothed, often with 3 lobes, and measure up to 10 cm (4 in) long.

The flowers have 5 shiny yellow petals and measure about 2–3 cm (.75–1 in) across, growing individually on long hairy stalks. The sepals are shorter than the petals and are hairy and lanceolate. They bloom March to June. After blooming, several flattened achenes up to 3.5 mm (0.1 in) long are produced.

== Etymology ==
The genus name Ranunculus is from the Latin, meaning "little frog" and refers to the preference many buttercups have for wet habitats. The specific epithet hispidus is from Latin, meaning "densely hairy".

== Distribution and habitat ==
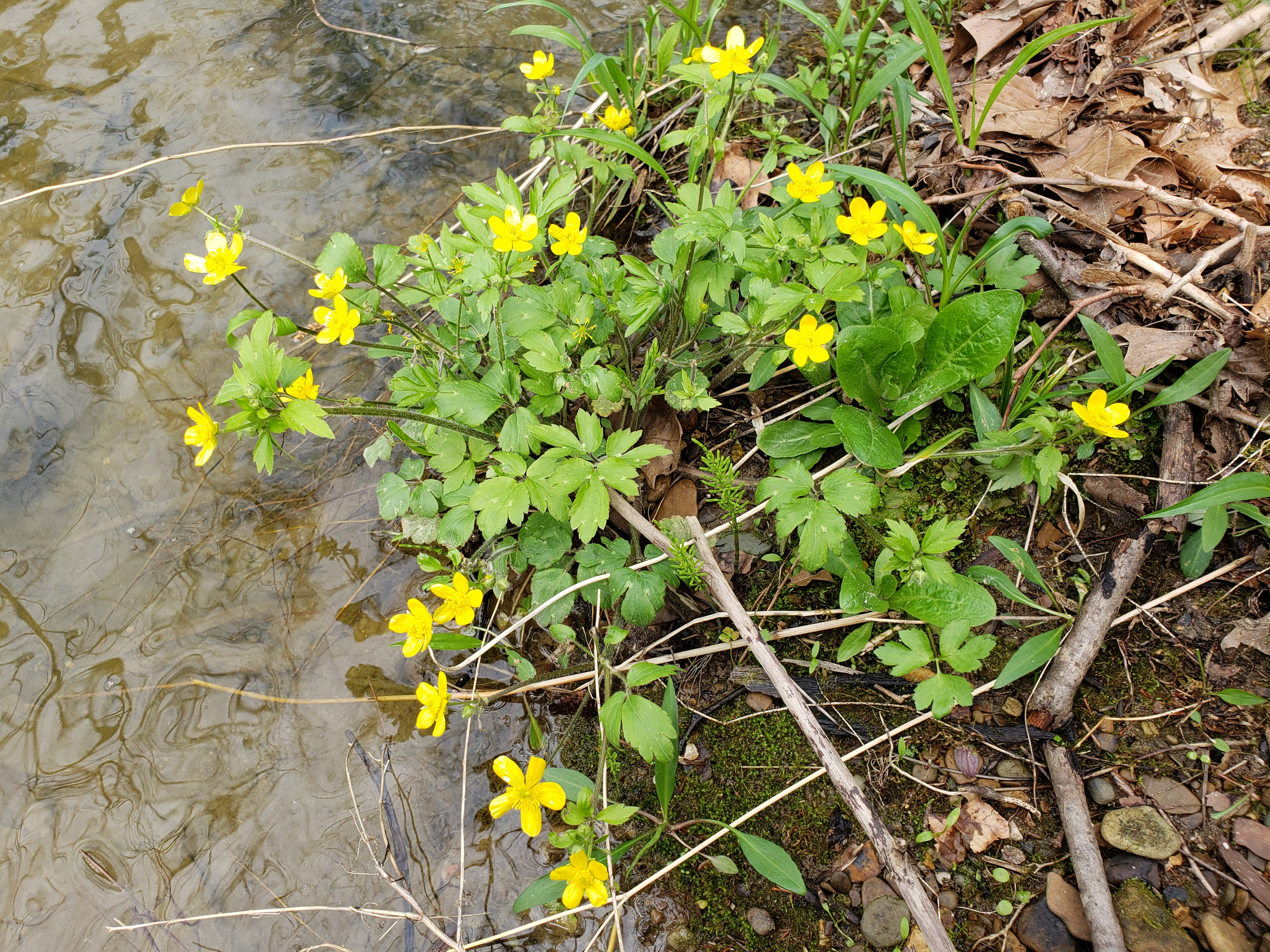
Ranunculus hispidus growing beside a creek

R. hispidus is native in the United States from Texas and North Dakota to the west, the Canadian border to the north, the east coast to the east, and Florida to the south. In Canada, it is native in Quebec, Ontario, New Brunswick, Labrador, Manitoba, and Prince Edward Island. It can be found in habitats such as dry woods, ridges, slopes, and valleys.

== Ecology ==
Birds, such as turkey and grouse, and small rodents eat the seeds.

== Toxicity ==
All parts of the plant are mildly toxic if eaten and could cause minor skin irritation if touched. The foliage is poisonous for mammals such as cows, which avoid eating it.
