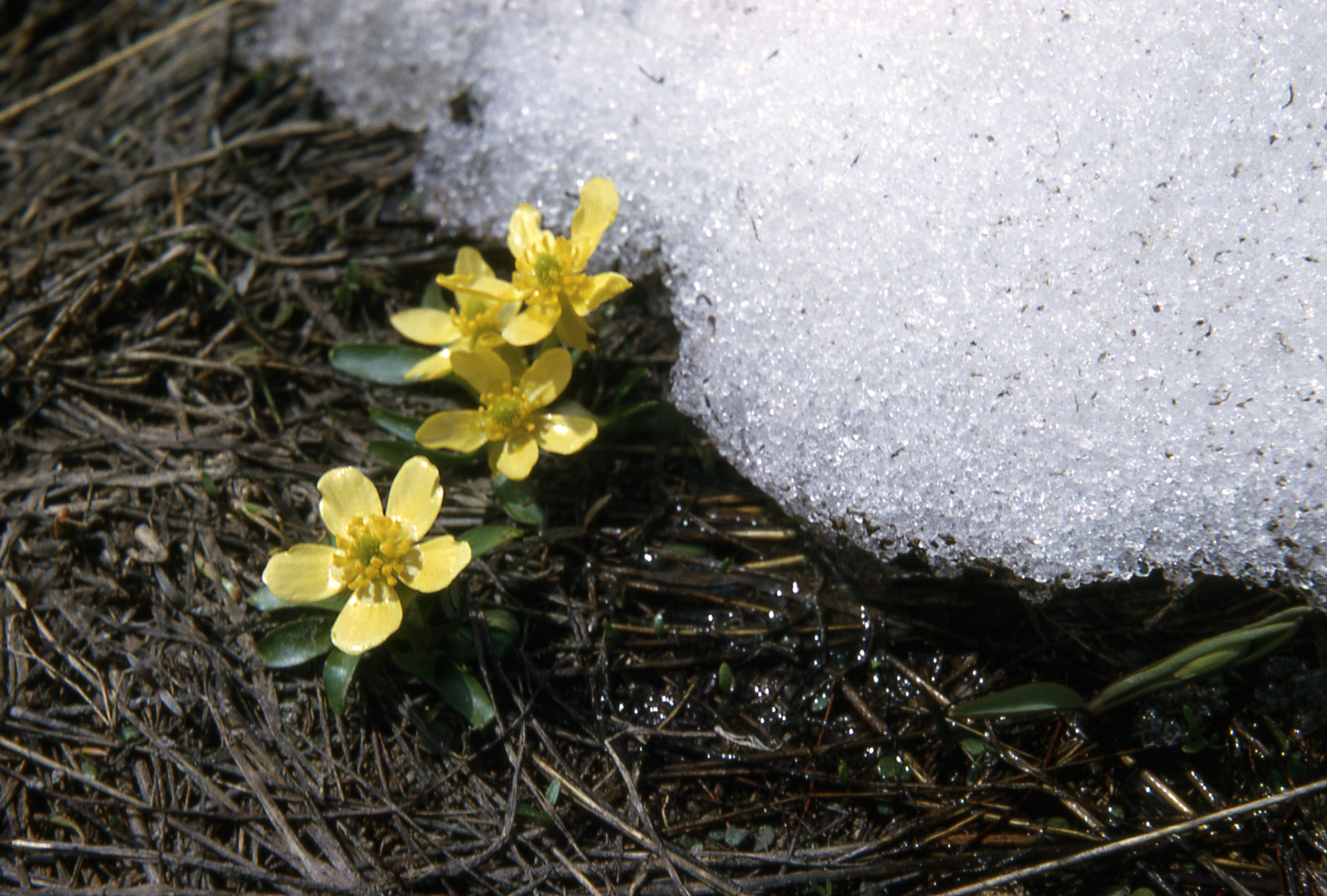

Scientific classification
- Kingdom: Plantae
- Clade: Tracheophytes
- Clade: Angiosperms
- Clade: Eudicots
- Order: Ranunculales
- Family: Ranunculaceae
- Genus: Ranunculus
- Species: R. jovis

Binomial name
- Ranunculus jovis A.Nels.

= Ranunculus jovis =

Species of buttercup

Ranunculus jovis is a species of buttercup known by the common name Utah buttercup or Jupiter buttercup. It is native to the mountains west of the United States, from Nevada to Wyoming. It is a small plant, growing a few centimeters tall on hairless stems with a few deeply divided fingerlike leaves at the base. It produces yellow flowers with five rounded petals, yellow stamens around a central nectary.
