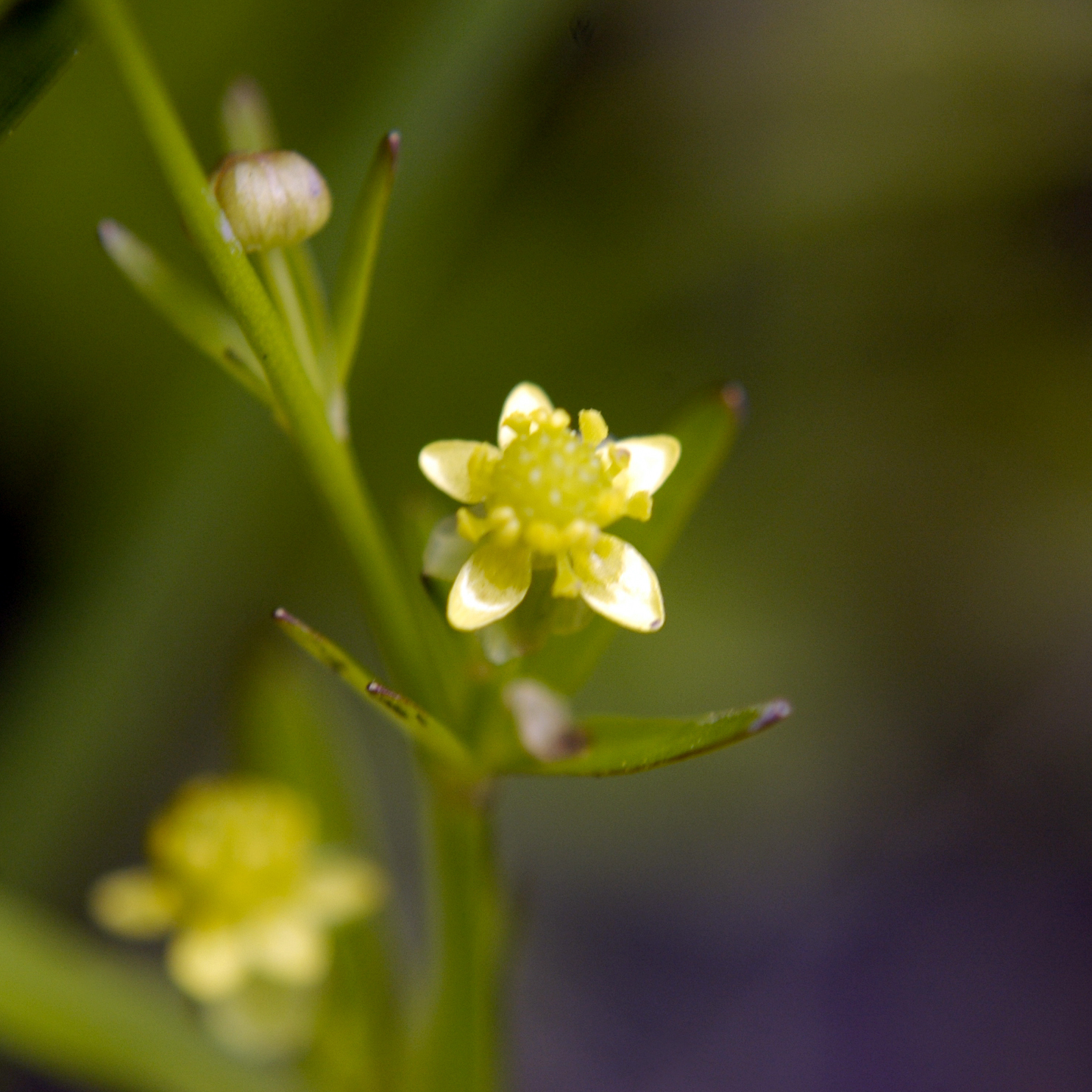

Conservation status
- Secure (NatureServe)

Scientific classification
- Kingdom: Plantae
- Clade: Tracheophytes
- Clade: Angiosperms
- Clade: Eudicots
- Order: Ranunculales
- Family: Ranunculaceae
- Genus: Ranunculus
- Species: R. abortivus

Binomial name
- Ranunculus abortivus L.

= Ranunculus abortivus =

Species of flowering plant

Ranunculus abortivus is a species of flowering plant in the buttercup family, Ranunculaceae. Its common names include littleleaf buttercup, small-flower crowfoot, small-flowered buttercup, and kidneyleaf buttercup. It is widespread across much of North America, found in all ten Canadian provinces as well as Yukon and the Northwest Territories, and most of the United States, except Hawaii, Oregon, California, and parts of the Southwest.

The specific epithet abortivus is an adjective from Latin aborior "pass away". It is unknown to what it refers, but it might describe the small petals that look like they have not fully developed.

== Description ==
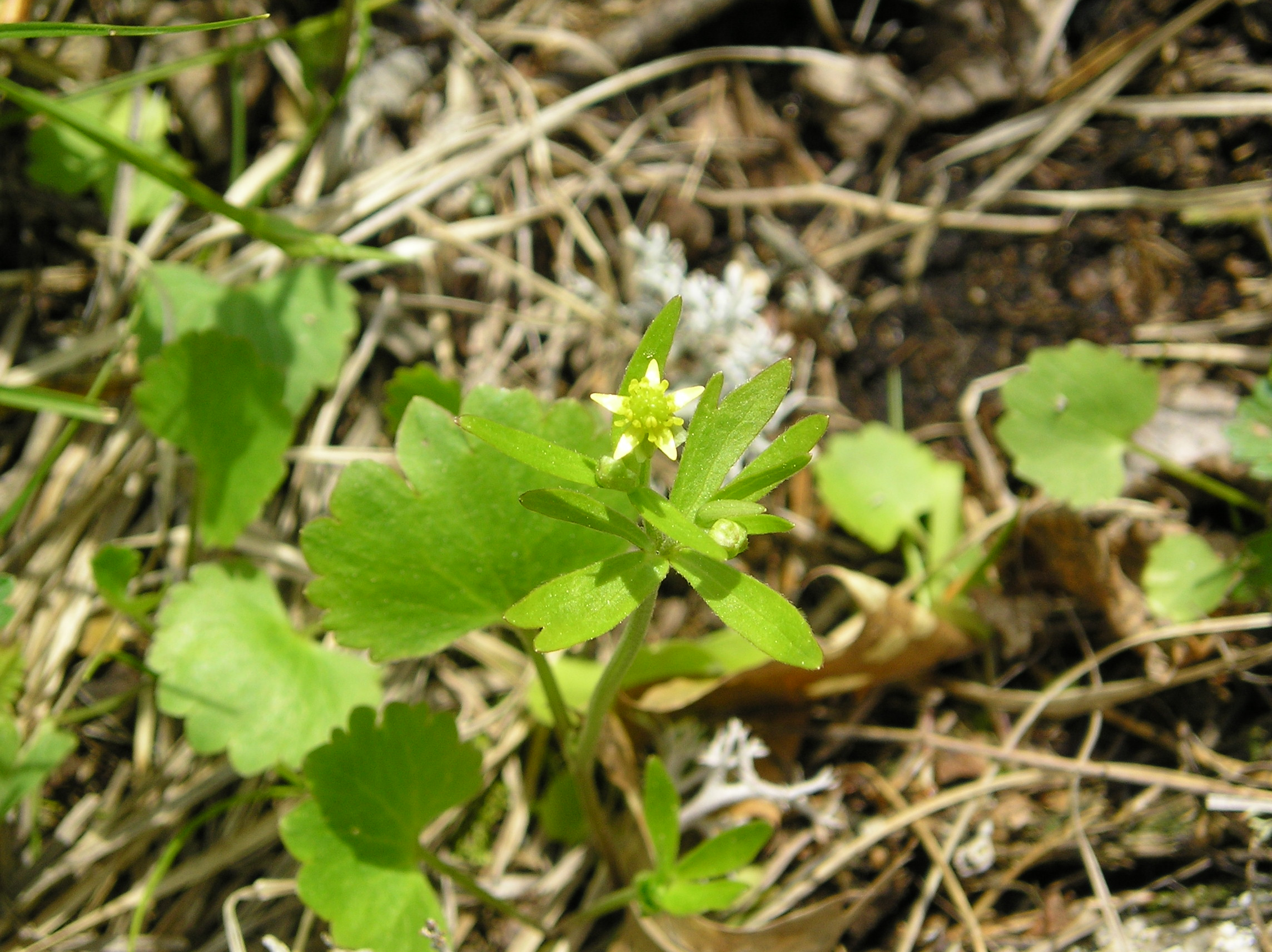
Basal leaves, stem leaves, and flower

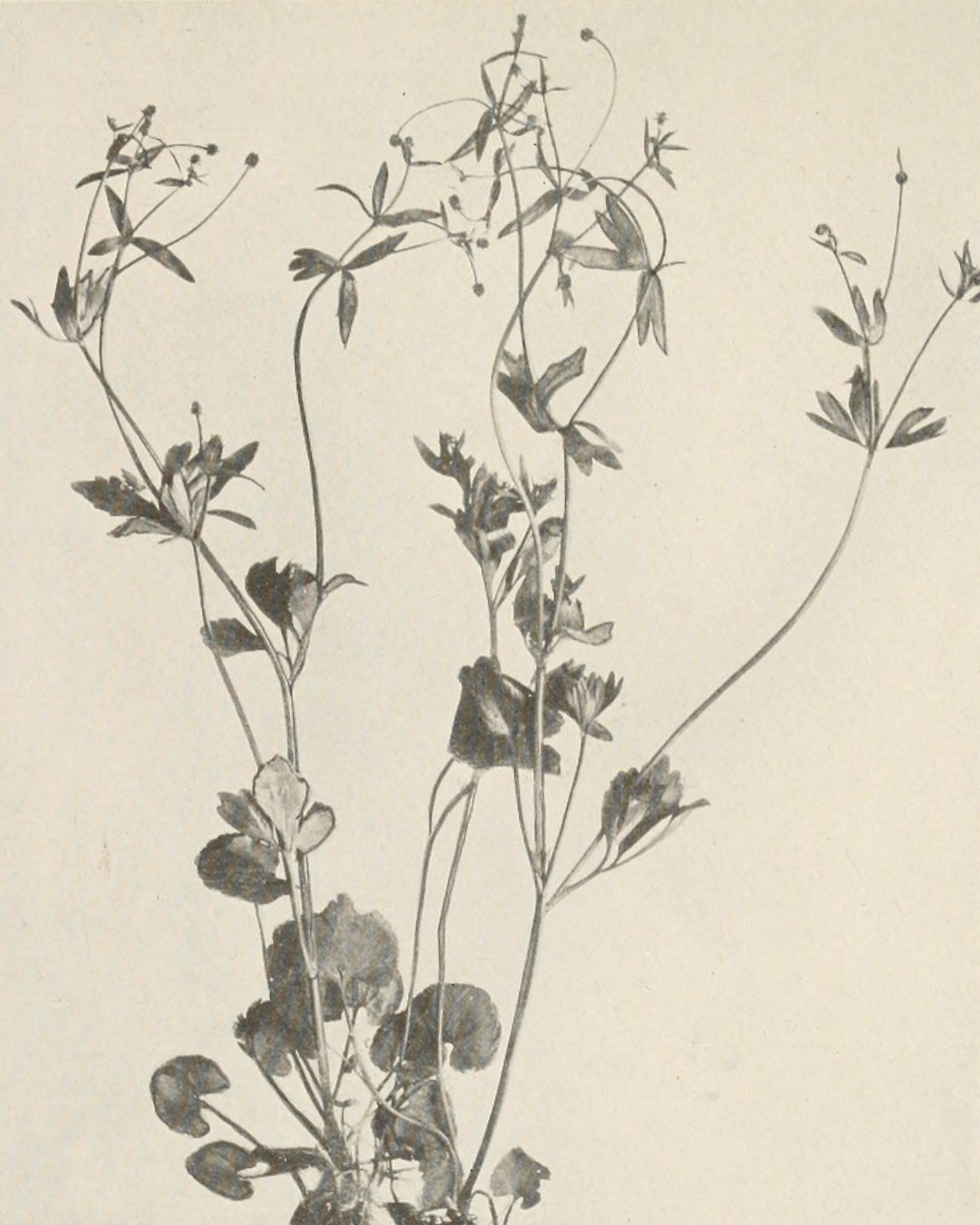
An illustration of an entire plant, from The plants of southern New Jersey (1911), by Witmer Stone

Ranunculus abortivus produces erect stems 10 to 60 cm (4 to 24 in) tall. The leaves are variable in shape, and both stems and leaves are hairless. The basal leaves are kidney-shaped to circular and persistent, with scalloped margins, and the stem leaves are alternate and deeply lobed or divided. Those at the bottom have long petioles (stems), those at the top are shorter-stemmed to stemless, with narrow blades or lobes.

Each stem can bear up to 50 flowers. The flower has five petals up to 1.5 to 3.5 mm (1/16 to 1/8 in) long, with a ring of stamens around a round cluster of green carpels. The carpels develop into brown, shiny rounded and slightly flattened achenes with a tiny beak. It grows in rich, moist woods and alluvial areas.

== Ecology ==
The flowers produce both nectar and pollen, which is eaten or gathered by small bees, ladybugs, and hoverflies and other kinds of flies. The seeds and leaves are an occasional food source for animals. The seeds are eaten by small rodents, such as the eastern chipmunk and meadow vole. As in other buttercups, the leaves are mildly toxic, containing a blistering agent, but they are eaten by cottontail rabbits. Both the leaves and seeds are eaten by turkeys.

== Uses ==
The plant had a variety of uses among Native American groups. The Cherokee cooked and ate the leaves. They used it medicinally for abscesses and sore throat and as a sedative. The Iroquois used it for snakebite and poisoning, smallpox, and toothache.
