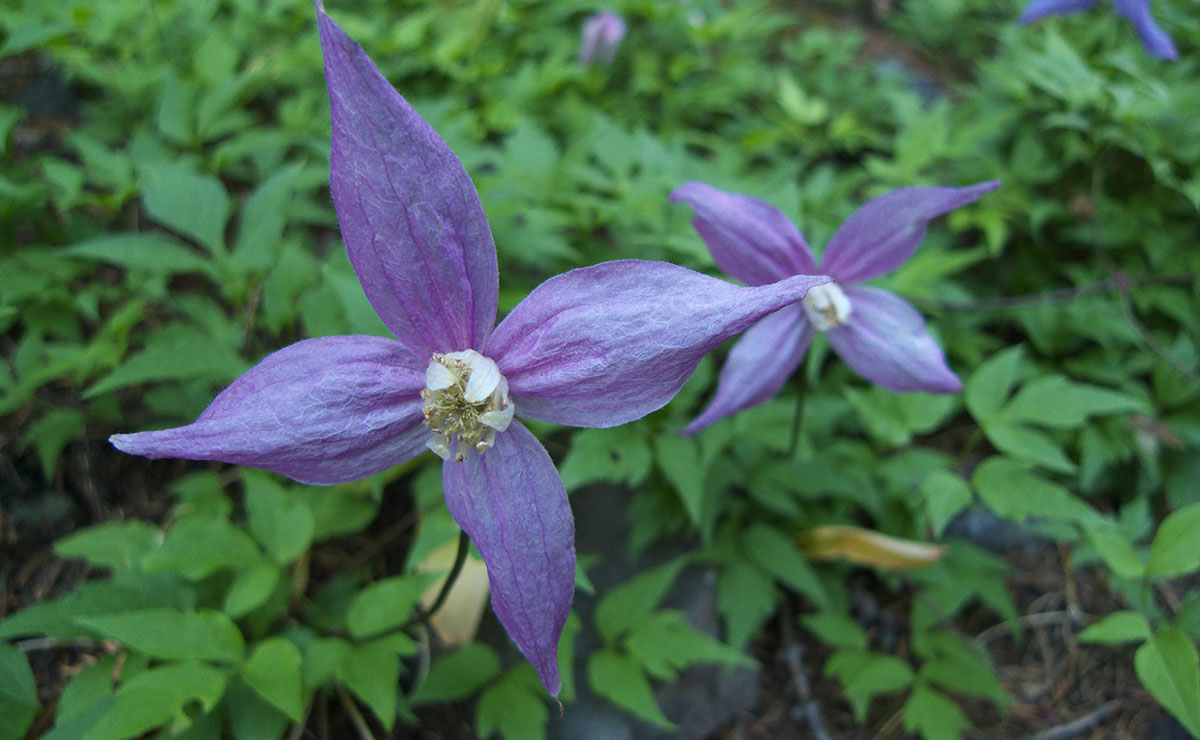
- C. occidentalis var. dissecta (Wenatchee Mountains, Washington)

Conservation status
- Secure (NatureServe)

Scientific classification
- Kingdom: Plantae
- Clade: Tracheophytes
- Clade: Angiosperms
- Clade: Eudicots
- Order: Ranunculales
- Family: Ranunculaceae
- Genus: Clematis
- Species: C. occidentalis

Binomial name
- Clematis occidentalis (Hornem.) DC.

= Clematis occidentalis =

Species of flowering plant in the buttercup family

Clematis occidentalis is a species of flowering plant in the buttercup family known by the common names western blue virginsbower or purple clematis. It is native to much of southern Canada and the northern United States.

== Description ==
Clematis occidentalis has compound leaves with three leaflets. Its leaflets measure between 1.5 and 3.5 inches in length and up to 2 inches in width, featuring either a toothless edge or a few shallow teeth. The leaflets have sharply pointed tips and are attached to a hairy stalk. Their shapes can range from an egg or teardrop shape to a heart shape, and occasional irregular lobes in two or three parts. The surfaces of the leaflets are either hairless or sparsely hairy, sometimes transitioning to a hairless state. Clematis occidentalis lacks tendrils on its stems. The leaf stalks twine around surrounding vegetation and structures for support. The stems are predominantly round to squarish, generally hairless, and may display a purplish hue, with the lower stem becoming woody.

Clematis occidentalis has single flowers that emerge from leaf axils, measuring 1.5 to 2.5 inches long. These blossoms feature four petal-like sepals, which range from blue-violet to pinkish-purple. The sepals are oblong-elliptic, hairy, and exhibit a drooping to somewhat spreading arrangement. The flower stalks are sparsely hairy, standing at 2 to 4 inches. Within the centre of the flower is a prominent column composed of numerous stamens surrounding a bundle of styles. Surrounding this central column, there are typically staminodia. The staminodia are flat, appearing white with noticeable veins that are often tinged pink.

Clematis occidentalis produces plume-like fruit. The flowers transform into heads of finely hairy seeds, featuring elongated tail-like structures of about 2 inches in length. As the seeds ripen, they transition from green to rusty brown, while the tails become grey and feathery. The seeds are then dispersed by wind.

== Infraspecific taxa ==
There are three varieties:

- Clematis occidentalis var. occidentalis - Eastern United States.
- Clematis occidentalis var. grosseserrata - Western United States.
- Clematis occidentalis var. dissecta - Endemic to Washington State.
