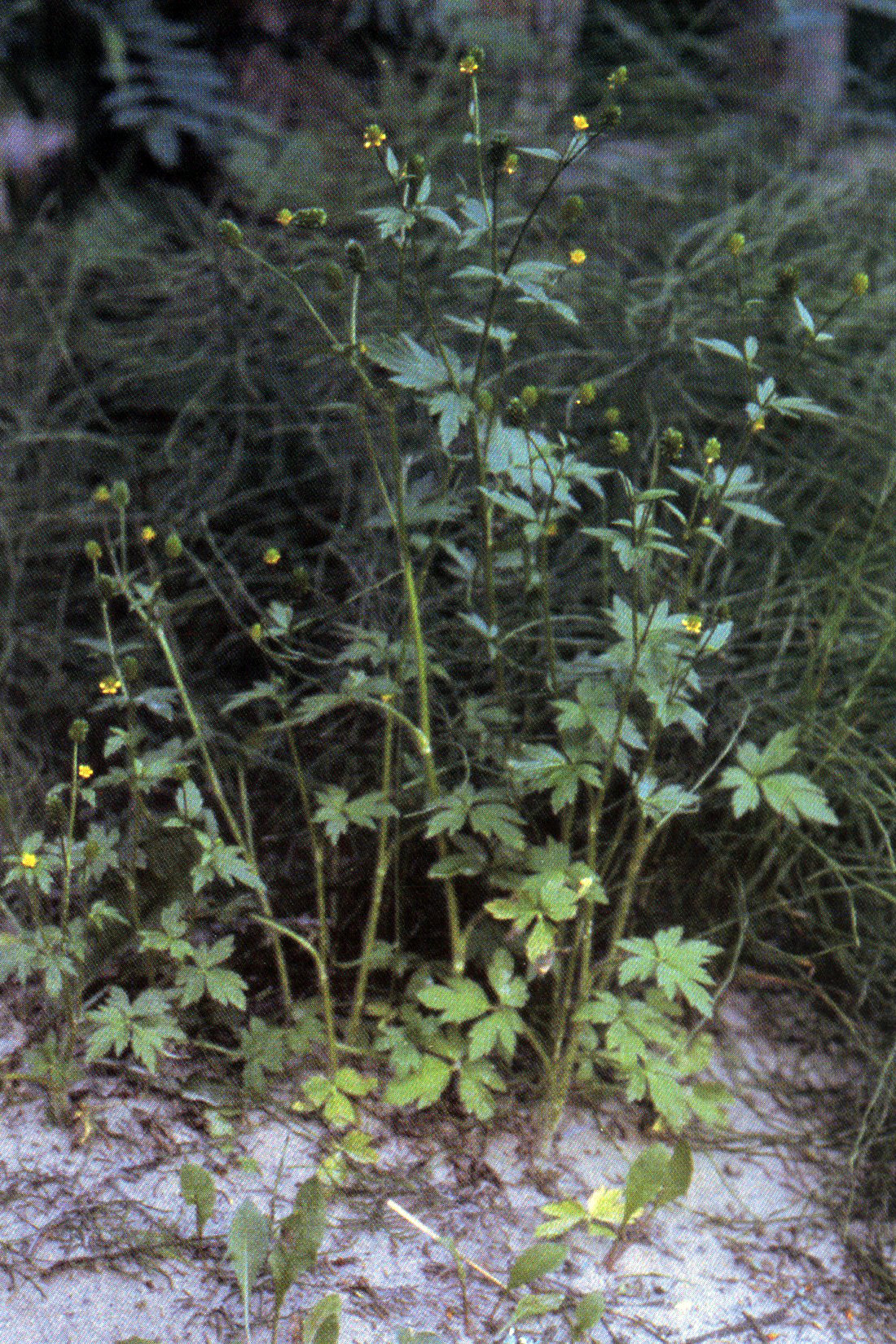

Scientific classification
- Kingdom: Plantae
- Clade: Tracheophytes
- Clade: Angiosperms
- Clade: Eudicots
- Order: Ranunculales
- Family: Ranunculaceae
- Genus: Ranunculus
- Species: R. pensylvanicus

Binomial name
- Ranunculus pensylvanicus L.f. 1781

= Ranunculus pensylvanicus =

Species of flowering plant

Ranunculus pensylvanicus is a flowering plant species in the buttercup family, Ranunculaceae. Common names include bristly buttercup, bristly crowfoot and Pennsylvania buttercup. It is native to North America with a distribution over the northern part of the continent.
