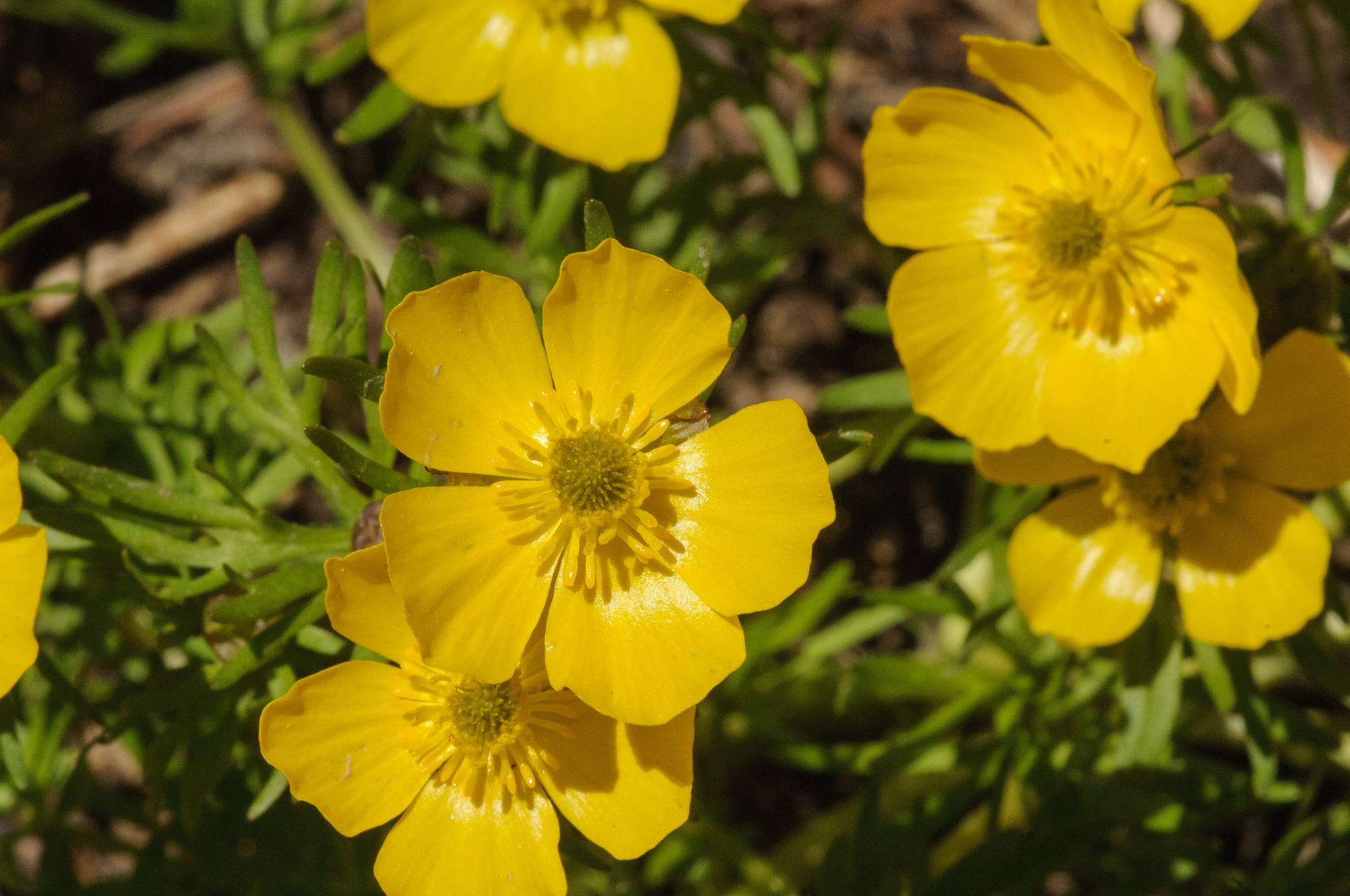

Scientific classification
- Kingdom: Plantae
- Clade: Tracheophytes
- Clade: Angiosperms
- Clade: Eudicots
- Order: Ranunculales
- Family: Ranunculaceae
- Genus: Ranunculus
- Species: R. adoneus

Binomial name
- Ranunculus adoneus A.Gray

= Ranunculus adoneus =

Species of flowering plant

Ranunculus adoneus, the alpine buttercup or snow buttercup, is a species of flowering plant. It is an alpine buttercup from the family Ranunculaceae. This species is mainly found in the Rocky Mountains in Colorado and Wyoming but can also be found in Idaho, northern Utah and eastern Nevada. Its typical habitat is short grass meadows near the edge of melting snow.

== Discovery ==
Ranunculus adoneus was first formally described in 1863 by Asa Gray in a list of species collected by several colleagues during the summer and autumn of 1862 on and near the Rocky Mountains in Colorado.

== Habitat and ecology ==
Ranunculus adoneus is a native species that is found only in the Rocky Mountains around the limit of snow where it is quite common. It is a long-lived perennial that is found at elevated meadows in alpine environments. The plants emerge at the edge of the melting snow and flower within a few days. The flowering time of R. adoneus is controlled by the time of snowmelt, so that on a steep gradient flowers appear first on a lower altitude and subsequently, with melting of the snow, several tens of meters higher. They are found at an altitude of 2500 – 4000 meters. Flowering lasts longer at lower altitudes. The flowers persist for approximately 10 days. Secondary flowers may open a week or two after the primary flowers.

== Morphology ==
The leaves of R. adoneus are about 4 cm in diameter and deeply dissected into linear lobes, with narrow leaf segments that grow at the base and along the stem and are often just one pair. The stem, which is about 9–25 cm long, is hairless and quite thick and ascends erect from the roots (caudices). It bears 1 to 3 flowers that are yellow with 5 to 10 wedge-shaped petals. The flowers are larger than the leaves, about 4 cm and are situated low in the young plant but become higher through stem elongation in the summer. The flowers are protogynous: the pistils mature before the maturation of the anthers to prevent self-fertility.

The flower has 5 greenish-yellow sepals that have white hairs on the lower surface. Petals are overlapping and curved-up towards the tip so the flower is cup-shaped.

Receptacles bear 50–150 stigmas, which mature over several days. Photosynthetic achenes, the fruit that contains a seed, develop from the fertilized ovules. Seeds disperse mainly by gravity 3 to 5 weeks after fertilization.

== Heliotropism ==
The flowers present heliotropism, a property that is often present in alpine and arctic plants. It allows the flowers to track the sun, warm up and attract insects When the flowers are not within 45° in line with the sun, and less insects visit the flower, the seed yield is much less.
