= Ashford Hill NNR =

Nature reserve in Hampshire, England

Coordinates: 51.354°N 1.194°W

Ashford Hill is a British national nature reserve next to the village of Ashford Hill in Hampshire. Part of the reserve is a designated a Site of Special Scientific Interest (SSSI). The site is one of Natural Englands nature reserves

== Geography ==
The reserve is 23 hectares (57 acres), of which 20.36 hectares (50.3 acres) is SSSI. The area of the national nature reserve which is a SSSI is part of the much bigger SSSI of Ashford Hill Woods and Meadows which is 142.1 hectares (351 acres) in size.

The reserve is a series of low-lying meadows in the valley of a small stream and also features woodland areas. The meadows area mix of London Clay and Bagshot beds.

The stream is called Baughurst Brook and eventually drains into the River Enborne.

== History ==
The wooded areas are believed to be part of the medieval royal forest of Pamber.

== Fauna ==
The nature reserve has the following fauna:

=== Birds ===
- Common kingfisher
- Common buzzard
- European goldfinch
- Eurasian treecreeper
- Common reed bunting
- Red kite
- Common chiffchaff
- European green woodpecker
- Eurasian bullfinch
- Water rail
- European turtle dove
- Garden warbler
- Dunnock
- European greenfinch
- Common chaffinch
- Common blackbird
- Common wood pigeon
- Eurasian blue tit
- Great spotted woodpecker
- House sparrow
- Western jackdaw
- Common house martin
- Goldcrest
- Common kestrel
- Eurasian blackcap
- Eurasian wren
- Eurasian siskin
- Western yellow wagtail
- Tree pipit
- Eurasian woodcock
- Great tit
- Eurasian jay
- European robin
- Song thrush
- Common moorhen
- Mandarin duck
- Snipe
- Eurasian nuthatch
- Common whitethroat
- Eurasian magpie
- Common raven

=== Invertebrates ===
- High brown fritillary
- Orange tip
- Purple emperor
- Pearl-bordered fritillary
- Green hairstreak
- Mother Shipton moth
- Burnet companion
- Emerald pot-bellied beetle
- Brimstone
- Narrow bordered bee hawkmoth
- Peacock
- Four-spotted chaser
- Small copper
- Small yellow underwing
- Scorpion fly
- Green-veined white
- Common blue
- Speckled yellow
- Straw dot moth
- Painted lady
- Yellow meadow ant

== Flora ==
The nature reserve has the following flora:

=== Trees ===
- Alder
- Hawthorn
- Blackthorn

=== Plants ===
- Yarrow
- Bugle
- Garlic mustard
- Marsh foxtail
- Meadow foxtail
- Bog pimpernel
- Wood anemone
- Wild angelica
- Sterile brome
- Sweet vernal grass
- Cow parsley
- Fool's water cress
- Lesser burdock
- Daisy
- Hard fern
- Marsh marigold
- Wavy bitter-cress
- Cuckooflower
- Lesser pond-sedge
- Spring-sedge
- Brown sedge
- Star sedge
- Glaucous sedge
- Hairy sedge
- Oval sedge
- False fox-sedge
- Carnation sedge
- Pale sedge
- Greater tussock-sedge
- Pill sedge
- Remote sedge
- Wood sedge
- Bladder sedge
- Common knapweed
- Common mouse-ear
- Greater celandine
- Opposite-leaved golden saxifrage
- Enchanter's nightshade
- Creeping thistle
- Meadow thistle
- Marsh thistle
- Pignut
- Beaked hawk's-beard
- Crosswort
- Crested dog's-tail
- Broom
- Cock's-foot
- Heath spotted-orchid
- Tufted hair-grass
- Foxglove
- Field horsetail
- Marsh horsetail
- Common cottongrass
- Hemp-agrimony
- Red fescue
- Lesser celandine
- Meadowsweet
- Heath bedstraw
- Lady's bedstraw
- Wood avens
- Marsh cudweed
- Floating sweet-grass
- Dyer's greenweed
- Yorkshire fog
- Water violet
- Bluebell
- Cat's-ear
- Slender St John's-wort
- Square-stalked St John's-wort
- Yellow iris
- Toad rush
- Soft rush
- Bitter-vetch
- Perennial rye-grass
- Common bird's-foot trefoil
- Greater bird's-foot trefoil
- Heath wood-rush
- Hairy wood-rush
- Gypsywort
- Common cow-wheat
- Wood melick
- Water mint
- Three-nerved sandwort
- Water forget-me-not
- Hemlock water-dropwort
- Greater broomrape
- Marsh lousewort
- Green alkanet
- Mouse-ear-hawkweed
- Ribwort plantain
- Rough meadow-grass
- Solomon's-seal
- Meadow buttercup
- Bulbous buttercup
- Lesser spearwort
- Creeping buttercup
- Great yellow-cress
- Wood club-rush
- Tall fescue
- Water figwort
- Figwort
- Red campion
- Ragged robin
- Woody nightshade
- Bog stitchwort
- Lesser stitchwort
- Greater stitchwort
- Marsh stitchwort
- Devil's-bit scabious
- Large thyme
- Lesser trefoil
- Red clover
- Marsh arrow grass
- Bulrush
- Gorse
- Marsh valerian
- Common valerian
- Brooklime
- Germander speedwell
- Wood speedwell
- Heath speedwell
- Thyme-leaved speedwell
- Bilberry
