= Cheam School =

Location
- Headley; Berkshire, RG19 8LD; England; 51.35364°N 1.25764°W

Information
- Type: Private preparatory school
- Motto: Omnia Caritate (All things to be charitable)
- Religious affiliation: Anglican
- Established: 1645; 381 years ago
- Founder: George Aldrich
- Department for Education URN: 116520 Tables
- Headmaster: Nicholas Milbank
- Gender: Co-educational
- Age: 2 to 13
- Enrolment: 428 as of February 2016
- Houses: Aldrich, Beck, Gilpin, Tabor
- Colours: Red and Blue
- Website: www.cheamschool.com

Cheam School is a co-educational preparatory school located in Headley, in the civil parish of Ashford Hill with Headley in Hampshire. Originally a boys school, Cheam was founded in 1645 by George Aldrich.

== History ==
The school started in Cheam, Surrey.

In the 19th century, the school was strictly for the sons of gentlemen only. One boy had to leave when his father was found to be a tradesman, with a shop in London selling cutlery.

In 1934 the school moved to its present site on the borders of Hampshire and Berkshire, previously a country house known as Beenham Court, when its part of Surrey was developing from a quiet village into a busy suburb. The school has occupied its present home, with nearly 100 acres (40 hectares) of grounds, since then.

Just before the move, Prince Philip, Duke of Edinburgh was a pupil there. His son, the future King Charles III, was later a pupil at the school.

== Present day ==
There are four houses (known as divisions): Aldrich (yellow), Beck (green), Gilpin (red), and Tabor (blue). The school colours are red and blue.

Cheam educates both boys and girls between the ages of three and thirteen and takes day-pupils as well as boarders.

== Headmasters ==
- 1645–1685: George Aldrich
- 1685–1701: Henry Day
- 1701–1711: Robert LLoyd
- 1711–1739: Daniel Sanxay
- 1739–1752 James Sanxay
- 1752–1777: William Gilpin
- 1777–1805: William Gilpin (1757-1848)
- 1805– ?: Joseph Wilson
- 1826–1846: Charles Mayo
- 1856–1890: Robert Tabor
- 1891–1920: Arthur Tabor
- 1921–1947: Harold Taylor
- 1947–1963: Peter Beck
- 1963–1971: Michael Stannard
- 1972–1985: Michael Wheeler
- 1985–1998: Christopher Evers
- 1998–2016: Mark Johnson
- 2016–2021: Martin Harris
- 2021–2022: Tom Haigh (acting)
- 2022–2024: William Phelps
- 2024– : Nick Milbank

== Notable alumni ==
In alphabetical order:

- Henry Addington, 1st Viscount Sidmouth, Prime Minister, 1801–1804
- Charles Bathurst, 1st Viscount Bledisloe
- Lord Berners, painter and composer
- Ivo Bligh, 8th Earl of Darnley, England's first Ashes winning captain
- Christopher Bulstrode, Orthopedic surgeon and author
- Charles III, King of the United Kingdom and head of the Commonwealth.
- Hugh Childers, Chancellor of the Exchequer, 1882–1885
- Randolph Churchill, minister and father of Winston Churchill
- Robert S. de Ropp researcher and writer
- Digby Mackworth Dolben, poet
- Reginald Drax, admiral
- Henry Carey Druce, British army officer, SAS
- William Fletcher rower
- William Gilpin (priest), headmaster, 1752–1777
- Douglas Hogg, 1st Viscount Hailsham, Lord Chancellor
- Yeshwantrao Holkar II, the last Maharaja of Indore, 1926-1947
- Aubrey Hopwood, lyricist and novelist
- Ronald Hopwood, British naval officer and poet
- Arthur Kinnaird, 11th Lord Kinnaird, footballer and banker
- Mark Lemon (1809–1870), founding editor of Punch and The Field
- Leonora MacKinnon, fencer for team Canada in the 2012 London Olympics
- Clements Robert Markham, explorer and Royal Geographical Society president
- Jake Meyer, Seven Summits mountaineer
- John Michell, writer and esotericist
- John MacLeod of MacLeod, 29th Chief of Clan MacLeod
- Patrick Wolrige Gordon, conservative politician
- Prince Philip, Duke of Edinburgh, consort of Elizabeth II
- Sukhumbhand Paribatra, 15th Governor of Bangkok
- Edward Plunkett, 18th Baron Dunsany, writer
- Harry Prendergast, Victoria Cross recipient
- Charles Younger, Scottish cricketer

== See also ==
- List of the oldest schools in the United Kingdom
