= Great Common =

Great Common may refer to:

- Great Common, West Sussex
- Great Common, Suffolk
- Kingston Great Common, National Nature Reserve in Hampshire
