= HMS Gibraltar (1892) =

Cruiser of the Royal Navy

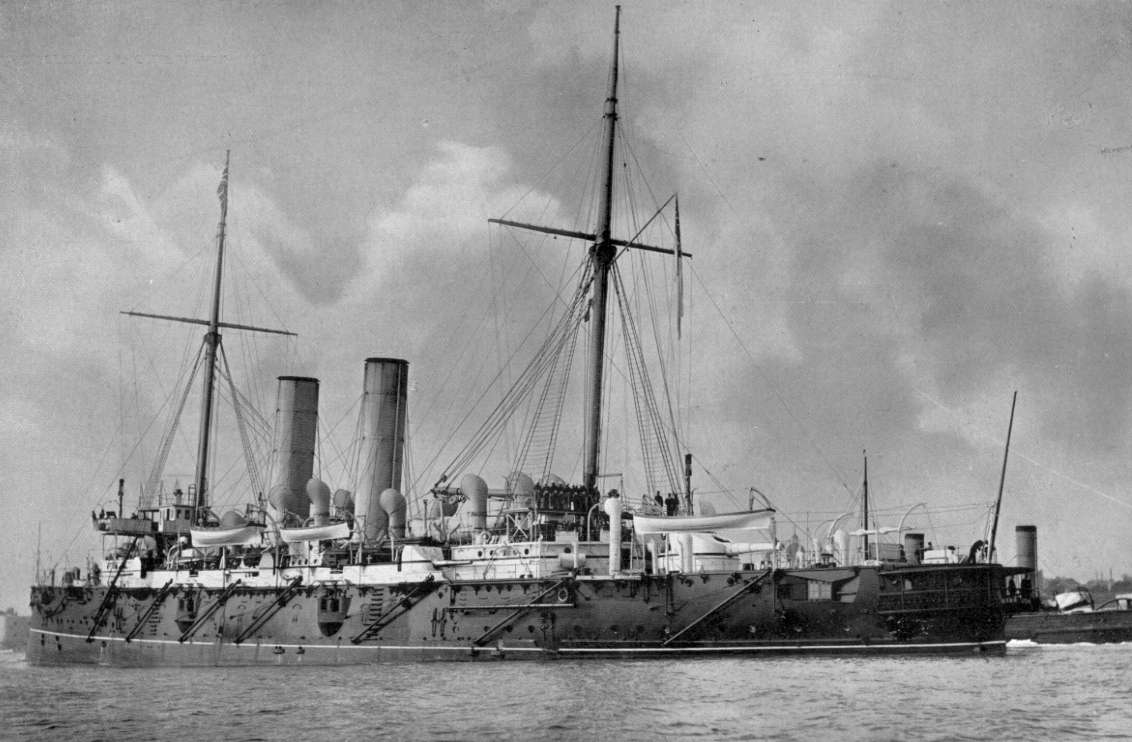
- HMS Gibraltar

History

United Kingdom
- Name: HMS Gibraltar
- Builder: Napier, Glasgow
- Laid down: 2 December 1889
- Launched: 27 April 1892
- Reclassified: Depot ship 1914
- Fate: Sold for breaking up September 1923

General characteristics
- Class & type: Edgar-class cruiser
- Displacement: 7,770 tons
- Length: 387.5 ft (118.1 m)
- Beam: 60 ft (18 m)
- Draught: 24 ft (7.3 m)
- Propulsion: 2 shafts, 12,000hp
- Speed: 20 kn (37 km/h)
- Range: 10,000 nautical miles (19,000 km) at 10 knots (19 km/h)
- Complement: 544
- Armament: 2 × BL 9.2-inch (233.7 mm) Mk VI guns; 10 × QF 6-inch (152.4 mm) guns; 12 × 6-pounder guns; 4 × 14 in (360 mm) torpedo tubes
- Armour: Steel: 3–5 inches (76–127 mm) decks; 6 inches (150 mm) casemates; 3 inches (76 mm) on 9.2-inch gun shields; 2–7 inches (51–178 mm) ammunition hoists; 12 inches (300 mm) conning tower

HMS Gibraltar, was an Edgar-class cruiser launched in 1892 for service in the Royal Navy. She was built and engineered by Messrs Napier of Glasgow. Of 7,700 loaded displacement, she was coal-fired with four double-ended cylindrical boilers driving two shafts. She could make 20 knots (37 km/h) with forced draught and 18 knots (33 km/h) with natural draught. She was a very good sea boat and an exceptional steamer.

== Service history ==
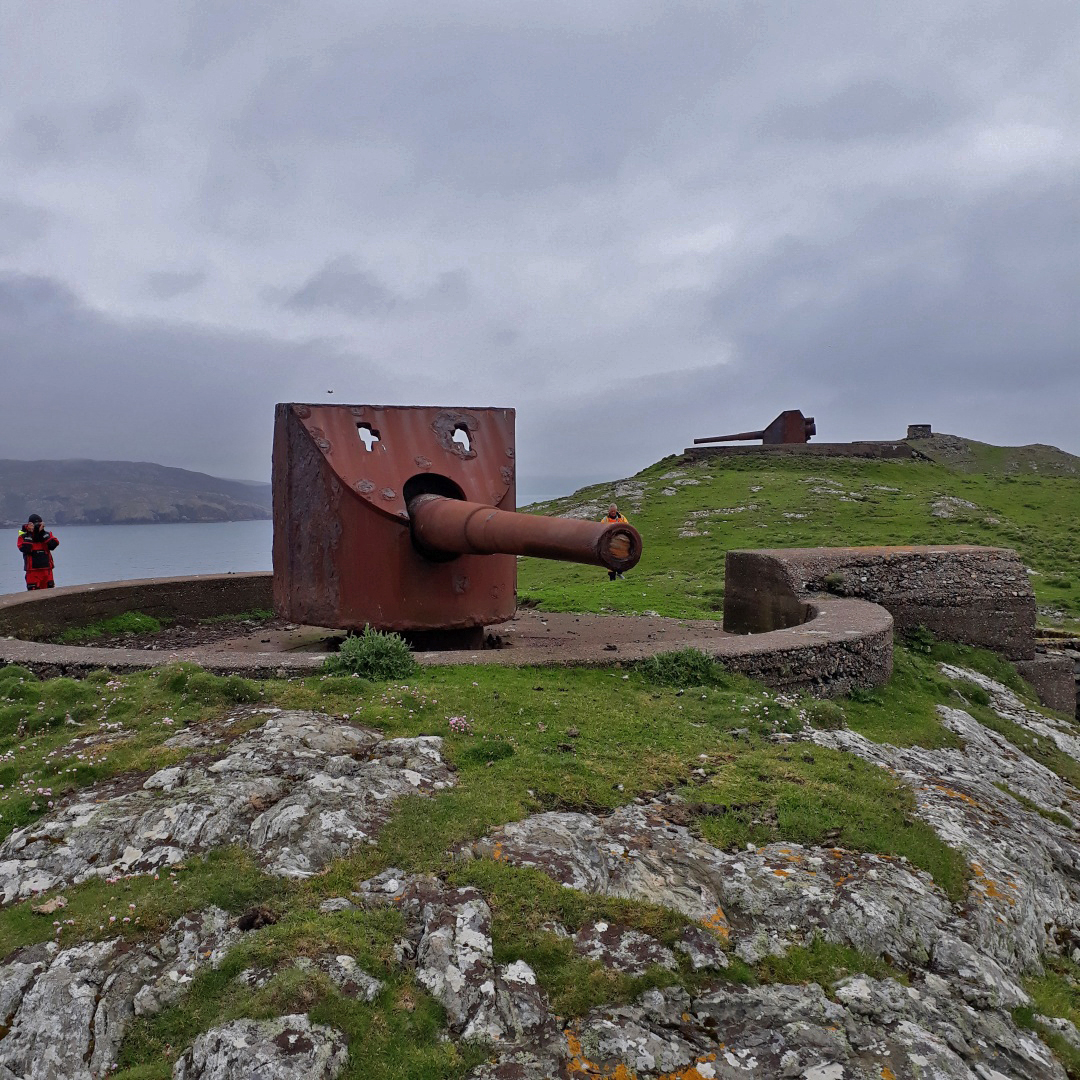
Guns from HMS Gibraltar on the island of Vementry, Shetland

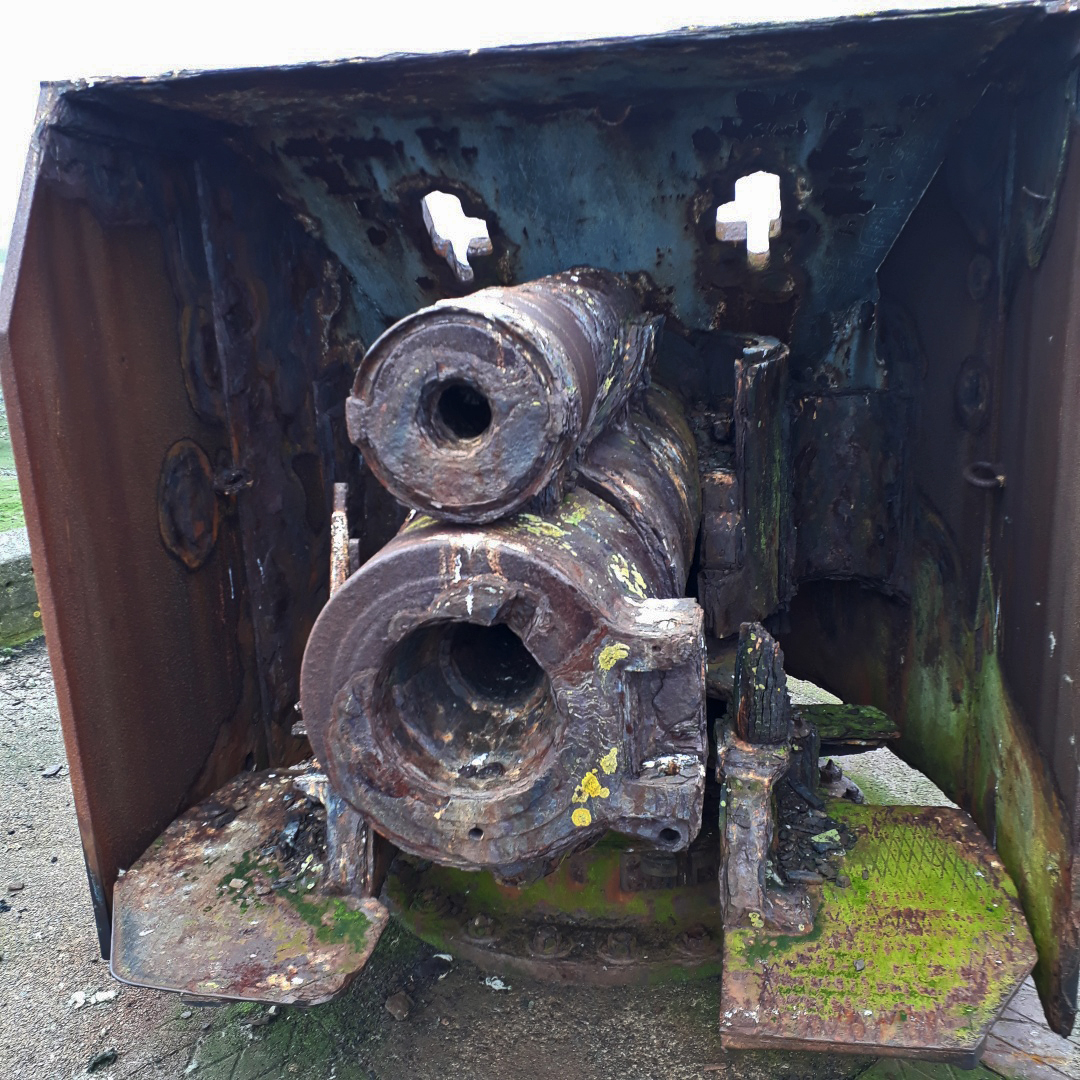
One of Gibraltar's remaining guns with its breech mechanism removed

During her early career Gibraltar served mainly on foreign stations. In late 1899 she had a complete refit at Portsmouth dockyard. In March 1901 she was commissioned by Captain Arthur Limpus, with a complement of 544 officers and men, to take the place as flagship of Rear-Admiral Arthur Moore, who had been appointed Commander-in-Chief on the Cape Station. She arrived in Durban in early September 1901.

In July 1902 she was head of a group of seven Royal Navy ships visiting Zanzibar for a show of force following the death of the sultan and accession of his son, Ali bin Hamud. The following month she visited Kenya, and Beira, Mozambique, before she was back in South Africa in September. Three months later she visited Saint Helena and Ascension Island in December 1902, and the following month she was in Bathurst and Sierra Leone.

Despite her obsolescence, she saw service in the First World War, first with the 10th Cruiser Squadron on Northern Patrol and from 1915 as a depot ship for this group, based in the Shetland Islands. Two of her QF 6-in Mk I guns were dismounted from the cruiser and moved to Swarbacks Head on Vementry, a headland that overlooks the entrance to Swarbacks Minn between the islands of Vementry and Muckle Roe for shore based defence. The two guns still exist on this site and can be visited.

Future First Sea Lord John H. D. Cunningham served aboard her as a midshipman. Captain Ronald Arthur Hopwood was in command 1913–1914, leaving at the start of the First World War.

Gibraltar was sold in August 1923 to John Cashmore Ltd for breaking up at Newport.

== Publications ==
- Colledge, J. J.; Warlow, Ben (2006) [1969]. Ships of the Royal Navy: The Complete Record of All Fighting Ships of the Royal Navy from the 15th Century to the Present (3rd Rev ed.). London: Chatham Publishing. ISBN 978-1-86176-281-8. OCLC 67375475.
- Roger Chesneau and Eugene M. Kolesnik, ed., Conway's All the World's Fighting Ships 1860–1905, (Conway Maritime Press, London, 1979), ISBN 0-85177-133-5
