= National nature reserves in Hampshire =

National nature reserves in Hampshire in England are established by Natural England and managed by them or by non-governmental organisations such as the Royal Society for the Protection of Birds or the National Trust.

List of reserves

- Ashford Hangers NNR
- Ashford Hill NNR
- Beacon Hill NNR
- Butser Hill NNR
- Castle Bottom NNR
- Kingston Great Common NNR
- Martin Down NNR
- Keyhaven, Pennington, Oxey and Normandy Marshes or North Solent NNR
- Old Winchester Hill NNR
- Titchfield Haven NNR

Other national nature reserves in England

- National nature reserves in England
- Natural England
