= Ashford Hill with Headley =

Parish in Hampshire, England

Coordinates: 51.356°N 1.232°W

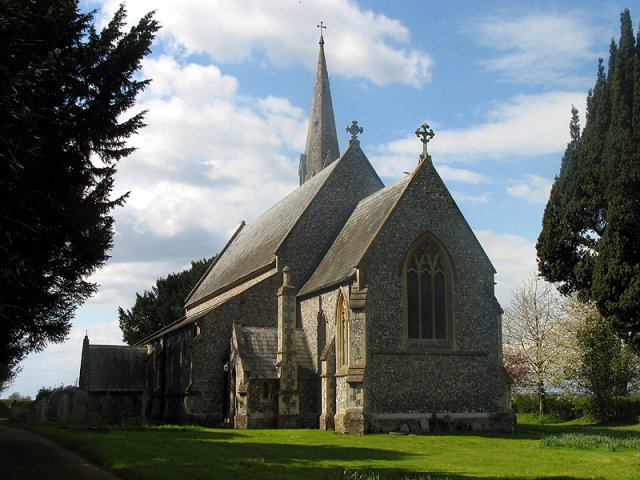
- Ashford Hill Church

- Location within Hampshire
- Population: 1,216 (2001); 1,277 (2011 Census)
- OS grid reference: SU5562
- Civil parish: Ashford Hill with Headley
- District: Basingstoke and Deane
- Shire county: Hampshire
- Region: South East
- Country: England
- Sovereign state: United Kingdom
- Post town: THATCHAM
- Postcode district: RG19
- Dialling code: 01635
- Police: Hampshire and Isle of Wight
- Fire: Hampshire and Isle of Wight
- Ambulance: South Central
- UK Parliament: North West Hampshire

Ashford Hill with Headley is a civil parish in the Basingstoke and Deane district of Hampshire, England. The parish includes Ashford Hill, Plastow Green, Headley and Kingsclere Woodlands. According to the 2001 census, it had a population of 1,216, increasing to 1,277 at the 2011 Census.

== Geography ==
The parish is bordered on the north by Brimpton in West Berkshire. To the east is the parish of Baughurst, south is the parish of Kingsclere and west is the parish of Ecchinswell, Sydmonton and Bishops Green.

== Wildlife ==
Ashford Hill National nature reserve is a national nature reserve managed by Natural England, adjacent to Ashford Hill village.
