= Rowland Langmaid =

British seaman and artist (1897–1956)

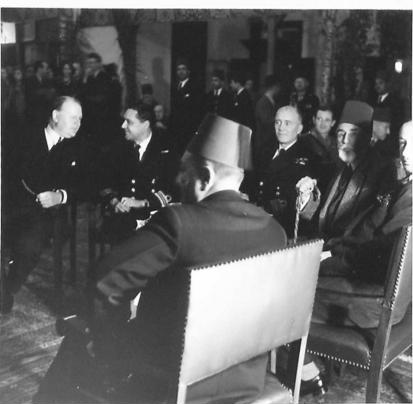
- Langmaid (centre) in 1942, sitting to the right of Mohammed Ali Tewfik
- Born: 1 December 1897
- Died: 11 February 1956 (aged 58); Calle de la Bolsa, Málaga

Rowland John Robb Langmaid R.A. (1 December 1897 – 11 February 1956) was a British seaman, engraver, artist and war artist.

== Life ==
Langmaid was born in to a Navy family in Vancouver and he studied maritime art with William Lionel Wyllie.

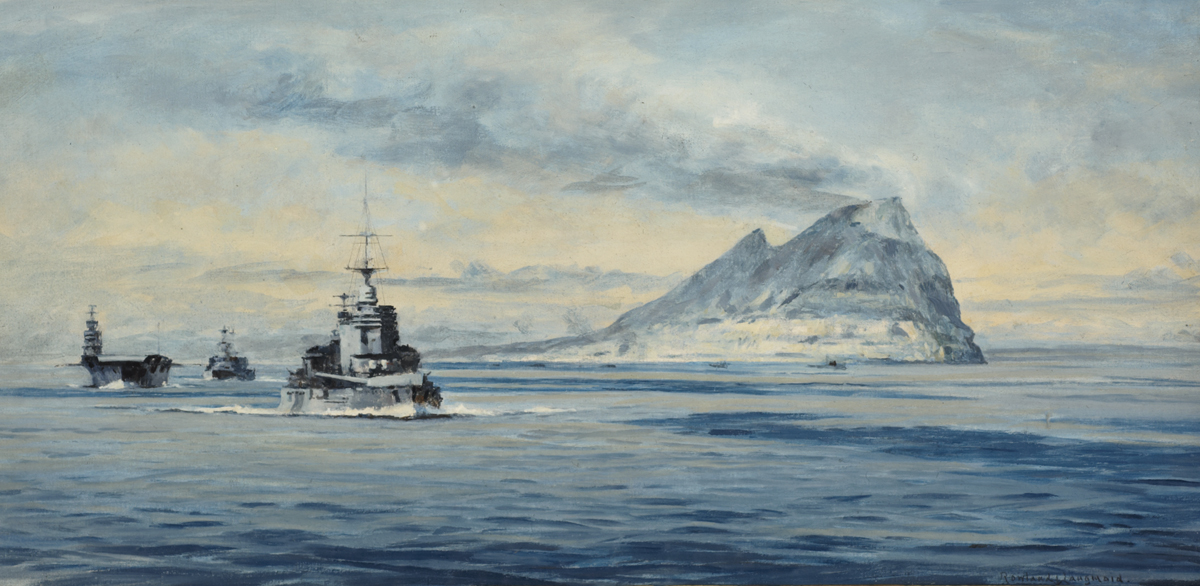
Force H off Gibraltar

He himself joined the Royal Navy in 1910 and trained on the Isle of Wight. His artistic abilities led to him sketching landings in the Dardanelles, where he served aboard the battleship HMS Agamemnon. He retired in 1922 to paint. He returned to his studies at the Royal Academy School and the Royal College of Art. He enjoyed some popularity and staged exhibitions in London, New York and Paris.

Laws of the Navy by Ronald Arthur Hopwood and illustrated by Langmaid

In the second world war he returned with the rank of Lieutenant commander and he was a war artist in Alexandria. He was known for illustrating Ronald Arthur Hopwood's poem called The Laws of the Navy (see illustration). The poem dates from 1896 when it was written by Hopgood to make fun of organisations. Full of cynicism and humour the poem was recreated on bulkheads and the poem and Langmaid's illustration was applauded by Eeyore Smith.

Langmaid was the official war artist to the Commander-in-Chief Mediterranean Fleet from 1941 to 1943.

In 1956, he died near Málaga on the south coast of Spain and was buried at the English Cemetery in Málaga.

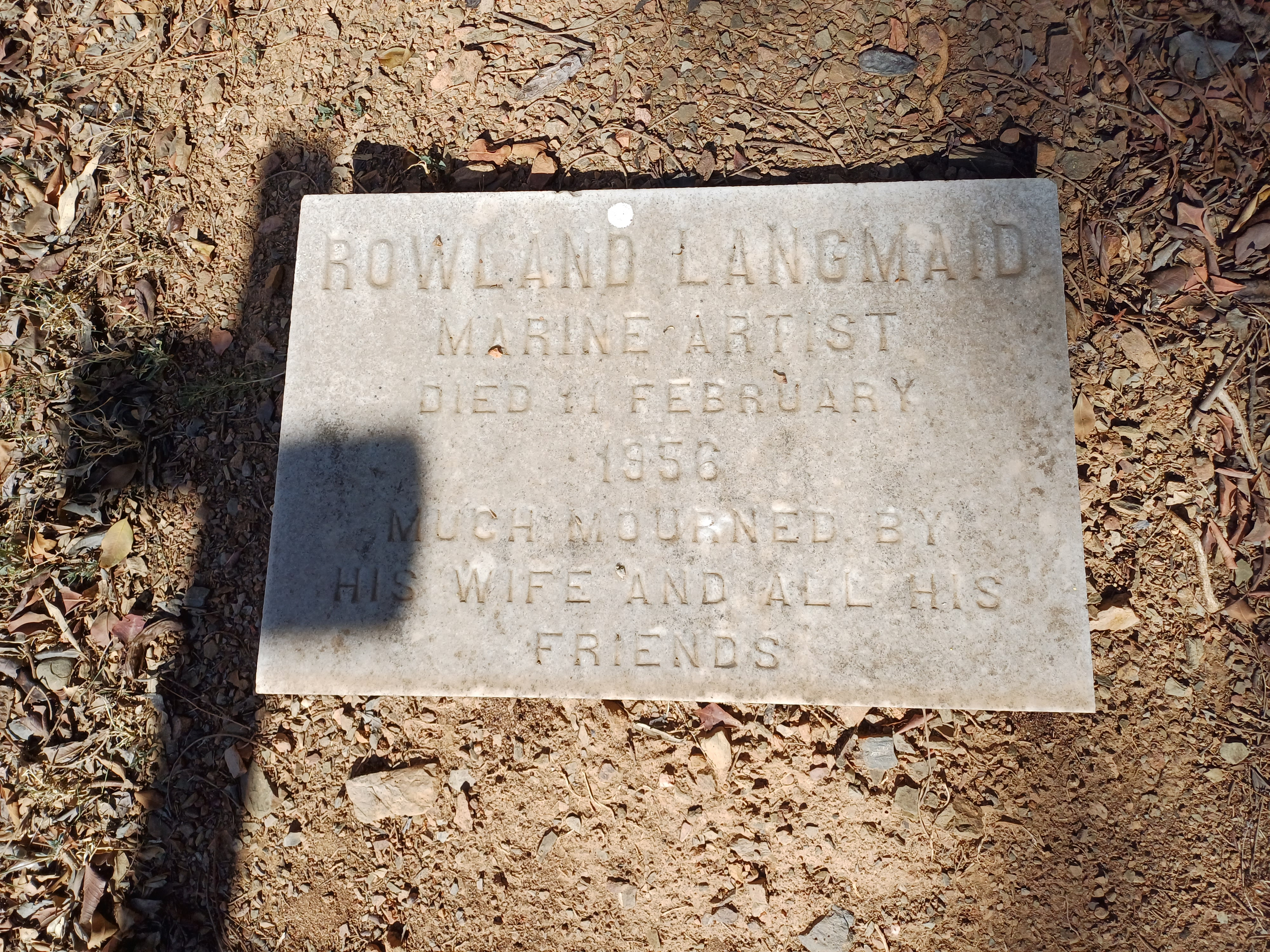
Rowland Langmaid's Gravestone
