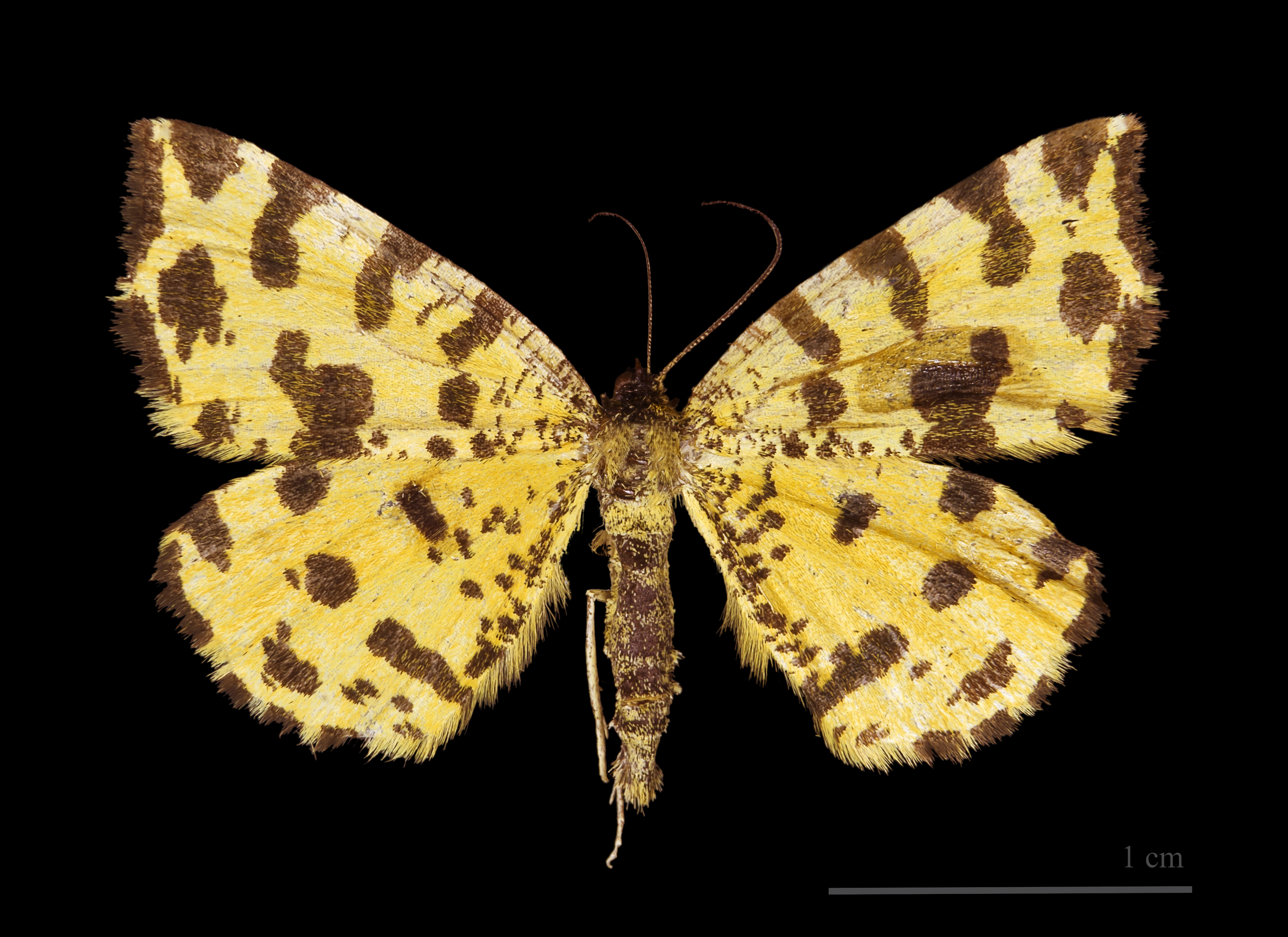
- Pseudopanthera macularia

Scientific classification
- Domain: Eukaryota
- Kingdom: Animalia
- Phylum: Arthropoda
- Class: Insecta
- Order: Lepidoptera
- Family: Geometridae
- Tribe: Ourapterygini
- Genus: Pseudopanthera; Hübner, 1823

Synonyms
- Apolema Hulst, 1896

= Pseudopanthera =

Genus of moths

Pseudopanthera is a genus of moths in the family Geometridae erected by Jacob Hübner in 1823.

== Species ==
- Pseudopanthera macularia (Linnaeus, 1758)
- Pseudopanthera ennomosaria (Walker, 1862)
