= Ronald Hopwood =

British naval officer and poet (1868–1949)

Admiral Ronald Hopwood CB
- Hopwood in 1918
- Born: 7 December 1868; London, England
- Died: 28 December 1949 (aged 81); London, England
- Military career
- Allegiance: United Kingdom
- Branch: Royal Navy
- Service years: 1882–1919
- Rank: Admiral
- Commands: HMS Grafton; HMS Revenge; HMS Gibraltar
- Conflicts: First World War
- Awards: Order of the Bath (Companion) (CB)
- Other work: Poet, lecturer, author

Signature
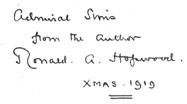

Admiral Ronald Arthur Hopwood CB (7 December 1868 – 28 December 1949) was a British naval officer and poet. He began his career in 1882 with the Royal Navy as a gunnery officer, completed it in 1919 as a rear admiral, and was acclaimed in 1941 as poet laureate of the Royal Navy by Time. As an author, Admiral Hopwood's first work was his poem The Laws of the Navy, published in 1896 when he was a lieutenant. With its good-natured military advice making it popular within both the Royal and U.S. navies, Time gives it "precedence among Navy men even over Kipling's If" and goes on to quote Hopwood's new poem Secret Orders in its entirety. The last lines of Secret Orders, written in appreciation of the Destroyers for Bases Agreement (a predecessor to Lend Lease), harken to the Second World War bond between the two navies.

== Early life ==
Hopwood was born on 7 December 1868 as the third son of Mary Augusta Henrietta née Coventry (1841–1894), the granddaughter of George Coventry, 8th Earl of Coventry, and John Turner Hopwood; he was educated at Cheam School. His older brother was Aubrey Hopwood (1863-1917), the lyricist and novelist.

== Military career ==
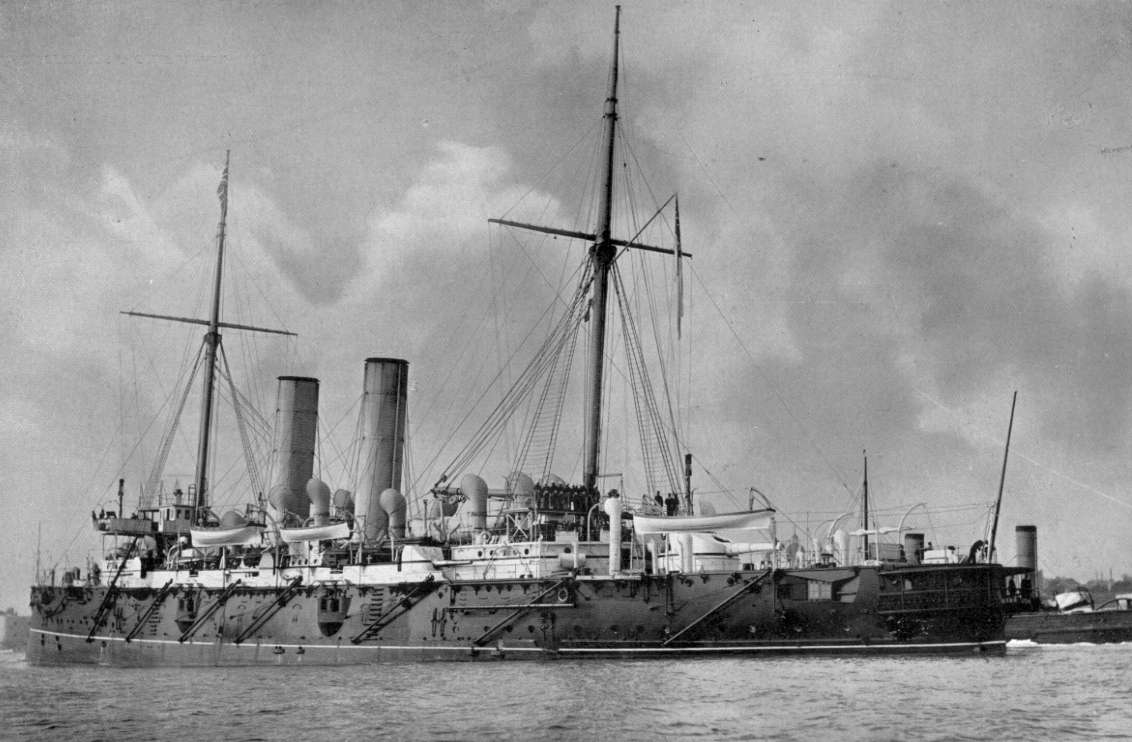
HMS Gibraltar was commanded by Captain Hopwood in 1913–14.

Hopwood entered the Royal Navy on board HMS Britannia as a naval cadet in 1882, and became a lieutenant in 1890. After serving in the gunboat Sparrow on the Cape and West Africa Station, he joined HMS Excellent in 1891 to specialize in gunnery, and on qualifying in 1893 was appointed to the junior staff in the HM Gunnery School, HMNB Devonport. He was gunnery officer of the cruiser Blake in the English Channel, and then from 27 March 1900 he was 1st and gunnery lieutenant of the battleship Goliath on her first commission, to the China station. Hopwood returned to the Gunnery School, joining the senior staff.

Promoted to commander on 26 June 1902, he was posted to the cruiser HMS Hawke as she conveyed troops to the Mediterranean from January to March 1903. He was second-in-command of HMS Glory, flagship in China, and later of the cruiser Duke of Edinburgh. He advanced to captain in 1907. After commanding Grafton and Revenge, he reattached to HMS Excellent in charge of gunnery training ships. Hopwood was flag captain from 1910 to 1912 to Vice-Admiral Jellicoe in Prince of Wales and Hercules. From 1913 until after the start of the First World War in 1914, Hopwood commanded the cruiser Gibraltar. He was appointed in December 1914, to membership in the Ordnance Committee, becoming its vice-president in 1917. He served as such until January 1919, when he retired on promotion to rear admiral.

== Later work ==
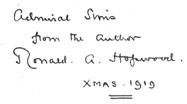
A note from a book to Admiral William Sims, U.S. Navy, then president of the U.S. Naval War College. (Note: The book is The New Navy and Other Poems (1919). With the book is a letter from Admiral Hopwood to Admiral William Sims, USN, President of the U.S. Naval War College in 1919. The letter is on the letterhead of the Navy League, and begins "19 Dec—Dear Admiral Sims—I am sending you a copy of my new book, especially with regard to the Convoy but I hope you will like some of the others. I believe you know my Laws of the Navy." Convoy is a poem within The New Navy... Convoying was the anti-submarine tactic employed by the allies to defeat the U-boat threat of the First World War. The book and letter are now in the Rare Book Collection of the U.S. Naval War College library.)

He was made a Companion of the Order of the Bath (CB) on 1 January 1919. (Note: HOPWOOD Ronald A N/E Captain RN 86V168—Vice President Ordnance Committee N/E 01.01.19 Gazetted—Admiralty CB(C)—For services as Vice President Ordnance Committee, Admiralty.) From 1919 to 1922 he was general secretary of the Navy League, the charity that supported the Royal Navy and the oldest such organization worldwide. His subsequent advancements to vice-admiral in 1924 and admiral in 1928 were on the retired list.

Late in his military career, Admiral Hopwood wrote Our Fathers, (Note: Appearing in the Naval and Military Record, 15 October 1913.) The Old Way, (Note: Appearing in Times (London), 16 September 1916.) as well as The Secret of the Ships, and The New Navy, "all of which were steeped in the tradition of the Service." Thirty-nine of Hopwood's poems, including Secret Orders, are collected in The Laws of the Navy and Other Poems, an expanded edition published in 1951. In his foreword, Alfred Noyes, acclaimed The Laws... as a book

of permanent value to our literature; and there is no other book of sea poetry quite like it. Ships and the ocean-sea are the main burden throughout. The manner is of the author's own generation, and the matter is timeless. Steeped in the history of the British Navy through the centuries, they speak of something which may be called, quite simply, the soul of England, something that has saved her from a thousand perils in the past and is her only safeguard for the future.

—Alfred Noyes
C.B.E., D.Litt.

Of less renown, Hopwood was an authority on Horatio Nelson's ships. On 21 October 1925, 120 years after the Battle of Trafalgar, Hopwood appeared before the Royal United Services Institution to lecture on "The Ancestry of Nelson's Ships." (Note: Vice Admiral Hopwood's introduction was an "inside-the-navy joke." Hopwood was introduced by Vice-Chairman H. H. Bruce with these words: "Ladies and Gentlemen, it is my pleasing duty to introduce to you the lecturer, Admiral Hopwood, who is known in the Navy and elsewhere as a deep student of Naval History and Naval Law. One of his works "The Laws of the Navy" is a Naval Classic." Emphasis added. Admiral Sir Henry Harvey Bruce, KCB, MVO, knew well Hopwood's Naval Law.) In 1921, he wrote an article entitled The Saving Grace that appeared in The Quarterly Review 467. Hopwood wrote strongly of this opinion:

The only criticism of a ship which I have never heard questioned, is that she is a compromise. That is to say, no ship has ever been endowed with the speed, armament, protection, range of action, etc., which the particular specialist admitted to be in accordance with his ideals. It follows that there are sufficient joints in her harness to offer targets enough to provide for the efforts of the most prolific inventor.

—Ronald A. Hopwood

== The Laws of the Navy ==
Illustrated by LT Rowland Langmaid, R.N.

The 23 July 1896 issue of the British Army and Navy Gazette presented a poem that was destined to become one of the Naval World's literary classics. Hopwood's work, entitled The Laws of the Navy, set forth what might safely be termed the "wisdom of the ages" for all who seek to make their way in large, hierarchical organizations, with special emphasis on the seagoing versions. During the Great War era, Lieutenant Rowland Langmaid, R.N., (Note: Rowland Langmaid joined the RN in 1910 and after service in the War retired in 1922 to paint professionally. He re-joined in 1939 as an official war artist.) made a series of drawings to accompany the poem, which was published in the version illustrated here. The writer Eeyore Smith in The Naval Review remarked "that The Laws of the Navy has had a considerable influence upon the careers of many naval officers who have served during the last half century. The commonsense, the mild cynicism ("there be those who have risen thereby"), the jingling metre, accentuated by the illustrations of [Langmaid], (Note: Smith mis-wrote and credited the illustrations to W L Wyllie. Wyllie had collaborated with Hopwood to produce a similar set of graphics and poetry for Hopwood's Our Fathers.) have left their marks upon the memories of those who have come across the twin frames which hang upon the bulkheads and walls of ships and naval establishments."

By the mid-1920s, the virtues of The Laws of the Navy crossed from the Royal Navy and penetrated the consciousness of the United States Navy. The poem began to appear in the U.S. Naval Academy's Reef Points, a handbook presented to freshmen (called "Plebes") for their edification and guidance. It has been featured in the annual editions of this publication to the present day, and many a former Plebe can recite its words by heart, having been made to memorize them as an essential part of the educational process.

Starting in the early 1970s, Reef Points provided a brief introduction to The Laws of the Navy, which is quoted here (as printed in the 1998–1999 edition):

As a word of advice, we include 'The Laws of the Navy' by Admiral R.A. Hopwood, R.N.(ret.). These twenty-seven laws contain words of wisdom that few of you will appreciate fully now, words which you may wish you had heeded twenty years from now. Read these laws, then apply them. See how those above you apply these rules--and how they sometimes disregard them--and the consequences. Be alert to learn from others; only through experience will your understanding of others broaden. You will become a richer and fuller person, a better naval officer.

=== First and last stanzas ===
The Laws of the Navy
To My Comrades in the Service

Now these are Laws of the Navy,
Unwritten and varied they be;
And he that is wise will observe them,
Going down in his ship to the sea;
...
As the wave rises clear to the hawse pipe,
Washes aft, and is lost in the wake,
So shall ye drop astern all unheeded,
Such time as the law ye forsake.

=== Mis-attributed stanzas ===
Two stanzas are often quoted that are not part of Langmaid's art or Hopwood's poetry. They appear at the end, set-off with Hopwood's last stanza as the moral to the poem.

Take heed in your manner of speaking
That the language ye use may be sound,
In the list of the words of your choosing
"Impossible" may not be found.

Now these are the Laws of the Navy
And many and mighty are they,
But the hull and the deck and keel
And the truck of the law is - OBEY!

While their appendage is an unsourced tribute to Hopwood's appeal, their meter is not quite Hopwood's.

== Secret Orders ==
The title of the 1941 Time article ("World War: Debutantes Celebrated") is unusual for a discussion of the Second World War. Its inspiration comes from the metaphor in the fifth stanza of "Secret Orders":

That even while Goering was spinning his webs,
Ere Goebbels consigned the flotilla to flames,
As trim and excited as so many debs
The fifty were bound for the Court of St. James,
Displaying the emblems that none can mistake
Their feathers—of steam, and the trains—in their wake.

The fifty are the fifty retired ("mothballed") destroyers transferred from the U.S. Navy to the United Kingdom in exchange for land rights on British possessions (i.e. the destroyers-for-bases agreement). The destroyers became the Town class, and were renamed for cities common to both the United States and Great Britain, or for rivers bordering the United States and Canada.

While the U.S. Navy considered the destroyers obsolescent, British naval officers were publicly "agreeably surprised" at their good condition as they debuted in the Royal Navy. (Note: "These ships are not only very practical symbols of American sympathy, but their good condition has been a most agreeable surprise to the British naval officers who took charge of them.") Though the fifty in truth were not much liked by their new crews, Hopwood was moved to poetry by the image of old ships returning to duty:

When orders arrive, irrespective of man,
To waken for service as fast as [they] can!
...
The mothers of pilgrims brought up over there
Are waiting with pride to convey them to Court,
As daughters of Freedom presenting their claim
To champion her cause in the family name!

== Personal life ==
On 26 June 1915, Hopwood married Gladys Wolryche-Whitmore (Note: References disagree about surviving family members. One has Mrs. Hopwood surviving. Another says Gladys Hopwood died 28 November 1949, predeceasing her husband by exactly one month.) of Thedden Grange, Alton, Hampshire, England. They had two daughters.

A keen sailor, his love of his profession was one of the dominating factors of his life, and, as is well known, it found expression in the many memorable poems he wrote about the Navy, of which perhaps The Laws of the Navy, Our Fathers, and The Old Way are the best known. ...After his retirement, and as long as his health allowed he took a keen interest in many naval institutions, among them being the Queen Adelaide Naval Fund, (Note: For the relief of Orphan Daughters of Naval and Marine Officers) the Royal Humane Society, the Royal Sailors' Daughters' School and Home (Note: Originally the Sailor's Orphan Girls' School and Home, it was later renamed as the Royal Sailors' Daughters' School and Home. In Hampstead since 1862, now defunct.) at Hampstead, and the Chelsea Branch of the R.N.L.I.

—Admiral Sir Richard Webb, RN
KCMG, CB

Hopwood has two portraits in the National Portrait Gallery, London, by Walter Stoneman.

== Published works ==
- The Old Way and Other Poems. London: John Murray. 1916. at Internet Archive
- The Muse in Arms The Muse in Arms - a collection of war poems, for the most part written in the field of action (1917) (Internet Archive)
- The Secret of the Ships. London: John Murray. 1918.
- The Laws of the Navy and Other Poems. London: John Murray. 1919.
- The New Navy and Other Poems. London: John Murray. 1919.

== Bibliography ==
=== Books ===
- Hopwood, Ronald A., Captain, R.N. (1916). The Old Way and Other Poems. London: John Murray. at Internet Archive
- Hopwood, Ronald A., Rear-Admiral, C.B.; Noyes, Alfred (1951) [1919]. "Foreword". The Laws of the Navy and Other Poems (Second ed.). London: John Murray.

=== Newspapers and magazines ===
- "World War: Debutantes Celebrated", Time, 6 January 1941, archived from the original on 3 December 2007
- "Obituary ADML. R. A. Hopwood: Gunner and Poet". Times. London. 2 January 1950. Also quoted in Naval Review 38 (1): 9–10.

=== Journals ===
- Hopwood, Ronald A. (November 1925). "The Ancestry of Nelson's Ships". Journal of the Royal United Service Institution. 70 (480): 617–635. doi:10.1080/03071842509426073.
- The Editor (February 1950). "ADMIRAL R. A. HOPWOOD". The Naval Review. 38 (1): 1, 9–10.
- Smith, Eeyore (November 1951). "THE LAWS OF THE NAVY AND OTHER POEMS". The Naval Review. 39 (4): 448.
- "The Queen Adelaide Naval Fund". Nautical Magazine. 38: 683. 1869.
- Hopwood, Ronald A. (April 1921). "The Saving Grace". The Quarterly Review. 467: 221–233.

=== Web ===
- "Adm Ronald Arthur Hopwood, C.B., R.N". The Douglas Archives. 11 September 2010.
- "'H' is for Highgate and for Hampstead". SilverTiger Blog. 20 March 2011.
- "Ronald Arthur Hopwood (1868–1949), Admiral". National Portrait Gallery, London. 1918.
- "The Laws of the Navy". U.S. Naval History & Heritage Command. 28 November 2005. Archived from the original on 19 February 2006.
- "Rear Admiral Ronald Arthur Hopwood". World Naval Ships Forums. 24 October 2009.
- Mayes, John (2009). "Index to Poetry by Admiral Ronald Hopwood, C.B. - in the Great Naval Traditions of England". InquireWithin.
- Hopwood, Ronald A. (19 December 1919). "The Hopwood-Sims Letter".
- The Navy List, Corrected to The 20th September, 1885, p. 100. (made midshipman 15 Jan 1884, serving 352)
- The Navy List, p. 93. (made lieutenant)
