= Ashford Hill =

Village and parish in Hampshire, England

Coordinates: 51.3529°N 01.2032°W

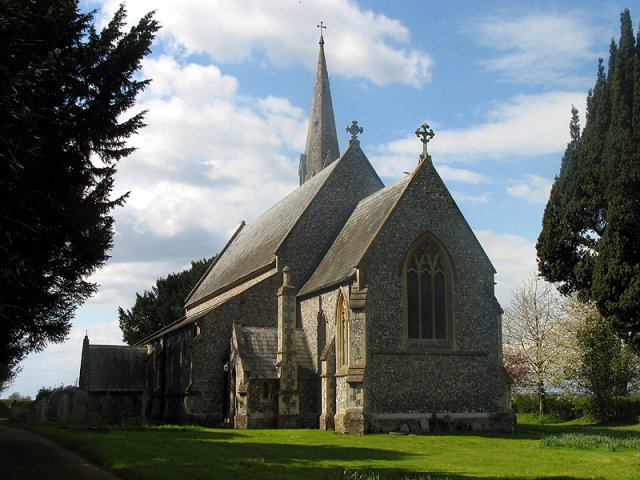
- Ashford Hill Church

- Location within Hampshire
- OS grid reference: SU5562
- Shire county: Hampshire
- Region: South East
- Country: England
- Sovereign state: United Kingdom
- Post town: Thatcham
- Postcode district: RG19
- Dialling code: 01635
- Police: Hampshire and Isle of Wight
- Fire: Hampshire and Isle of Wight
- Ambulance: South Central
- UK Parliament: North West Hampshire

Ashford Hill is a village in Basingstoke and Deane, Hampshire, England.

== Governance ==
The village of Ashford Hill is part of the civil parish of Ashford Hill with Headley, and is part of the Kingsclere ward of Basingstoke and Deane borough council. The borough council is a Non-metropolitan district of Hampshire County Council.

== Geography ==
The village has a National nature reserve which is called Ashford Hill National nature reserve.
