= Plastow Green =

Hamlet in Hampshire, England

Coordinates: 51.3536°N 1.2355°W

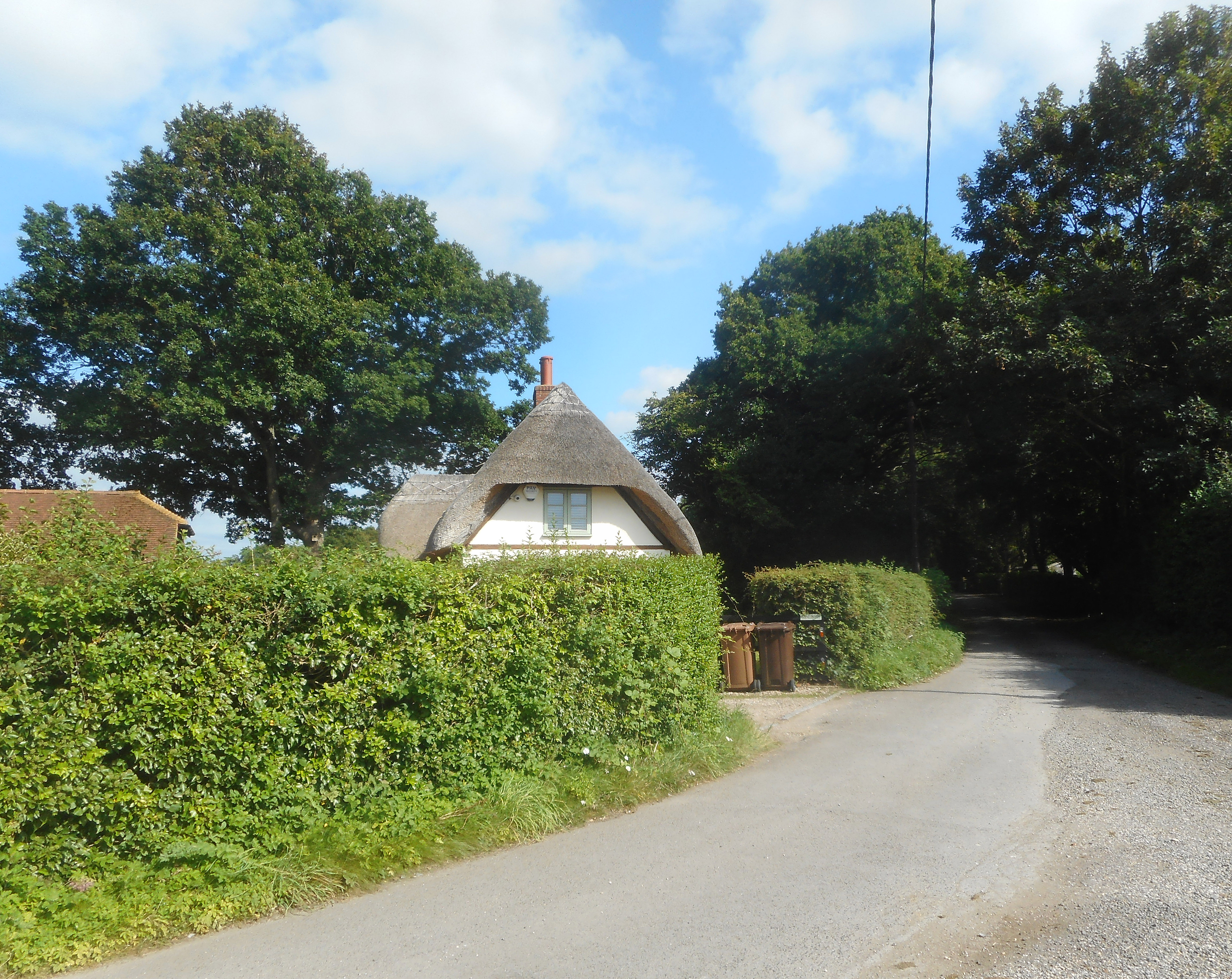
- Thatch in Plastow Green

- Location within Hampshire
- Shire county: Hampshire
- Region: South East
- Country: England
- Sovereign state: United Kingdom
- Post town: Thatcham
- Postcode district: RG19
- Dialling code: 01635
- Police: Hampshire and Isle of Wight
- Fire: Hampshire and Isle of Wight
- Ambulance: South Central

Plastow Green is a hamlet in north Hampshire, England.

== Governance ==
The hamlet is part of the civil parish of Ashford Hill with Headley, and is part of the Kingsclere ward of Basingstoke and Deane borough council. The borough council is a Non-metropolitan district of Hampshire County Council.
