= Christopher Bulstrode =

British academic and professor

Christopher Bulstrode CBE
- Born: 5 January 1951; Guernsey
- Died: 7 December 2023 (aged 72)
- Education: Oxford; Cambridge
- Occupation: academic
- Medical career
- Institutions: Green Templeton College, Oxford; British Army
- Sub-specialties: trauma and orthopaedics
- Website: http://christopherbulstrode.com/

Christopher John Kent Bulstrode CBE (1951–2023) was a British academic and professor at Green Templeton College, Oxford.

== Early life and education ==
Christopher Bulstrode was born on 5 January 1951 in Guernsey, to radiologist John and Jacqueline Bulstrode. He attended Radley College following his early education at Cheam School, where he notably interacted with the future King Charles III.

Bulstrode's academic pursuits began with a strong interest in zoology, leading him to study under Nobel laureate, Konrad Lorenz in Bavaria. This experience prompted a temporary shift from medicine to zoology at Oxford, where he led student expeditions. However, he later returned to medicine, completing his education at Cambridge and Oxford.

== Career ==
Bulstrode's medical career began in Africa, where he worked in refugee camps and as a lecturer in veterinary pathology. Later, he returned to the UK and changed his specialisation to trauma and orthopaedics. He was known for his outspoken views on medical ethics and reform, particularly advocating for the rights of junior doctors and critiquing established medical practices.

Bulstrode's later career included service as a trauma surgeon in the British Army, despite initial age-related challenges. His deployment to Afghanistan was a notable period, where he contributed to healthcare restructuring and worked in refugee camps. His post-military career involved emergency medicine in New Zealand and contributions to Doctors of the World. His service was recognised in 2016 when he was appointed CBE.

Bulstrode died on 7 December 2023 under suspicious circumstances and his death is the subject of a murder investigation. Before he died he completed his autobiography which is now being reviewed for a film based on his life, particularly as a medic in the army. His memorial service was held at Magdalen College Oxford.
