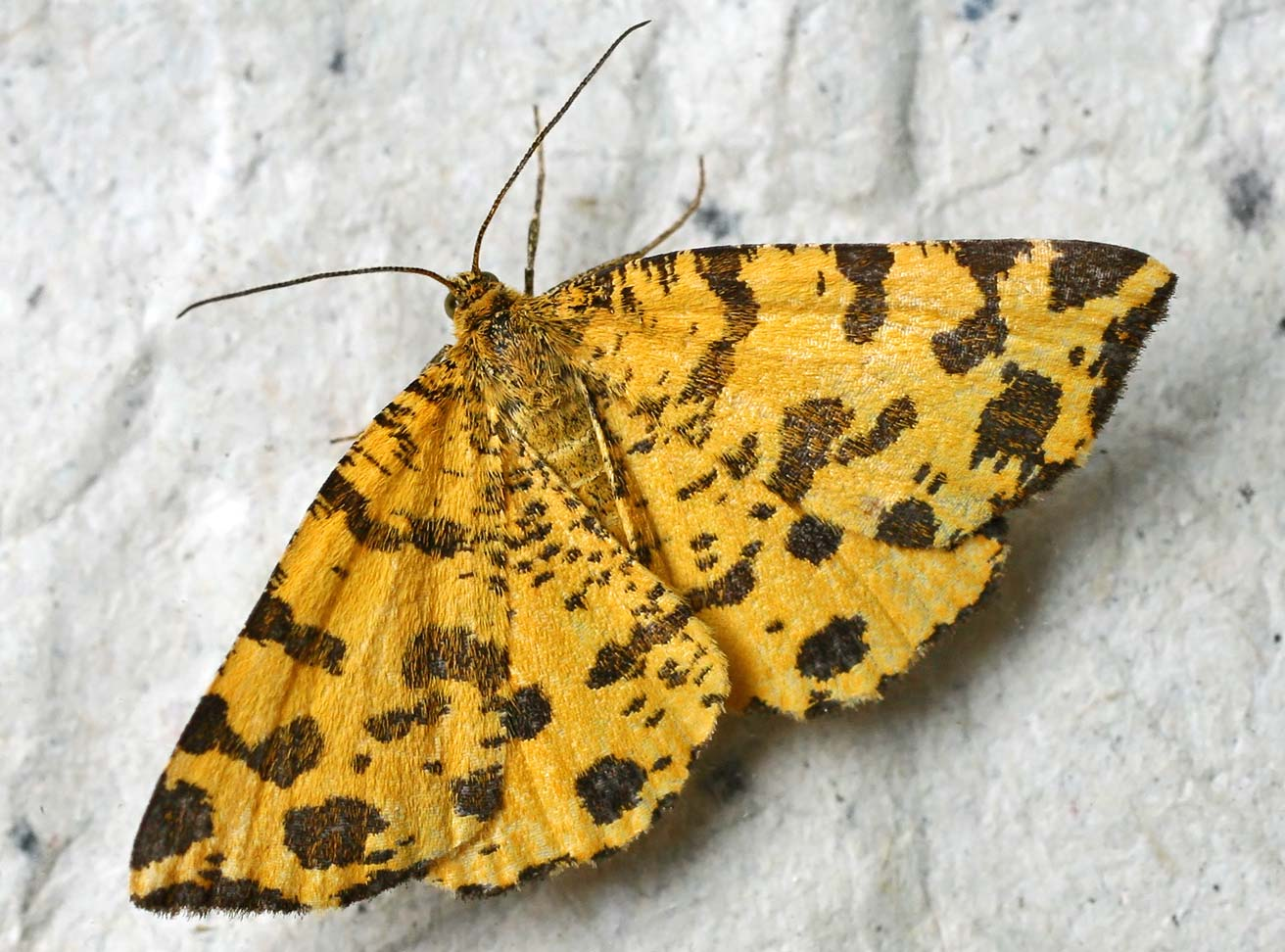

Scientific classification
- Kingdom: Animalia
- Phylum: Arthropoda
- Clade: Pancrustacea
- Class: Insecta
- Order: Lepidoptera
- Family: Geometridae
- Genus: Pseudopanthera
- Species: P. macularia

Binomial name
- Pseudopanthera macularia (Linnaeus, 1758)

= Pseudopanthera macularia =

Species of moth

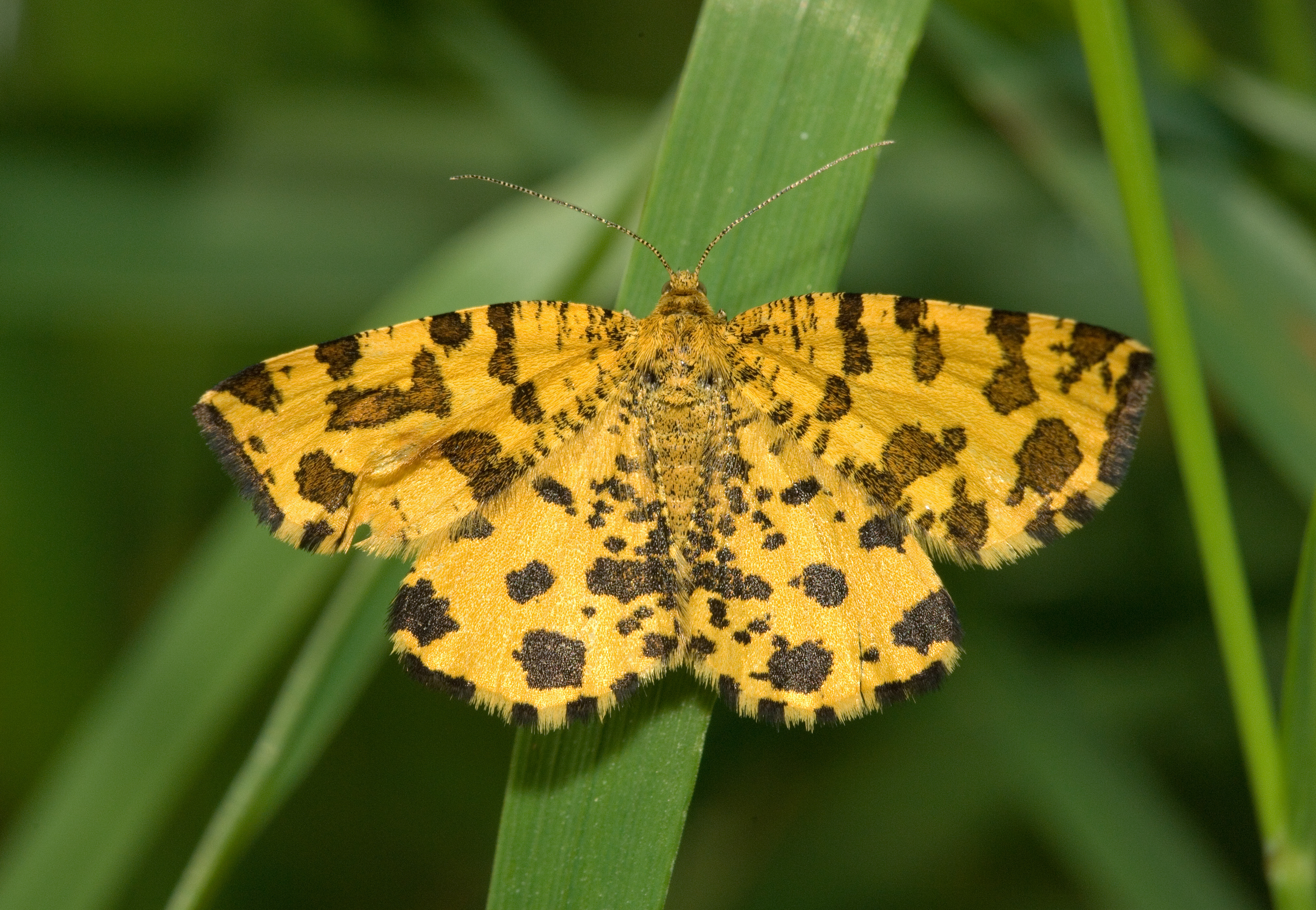
Upperside

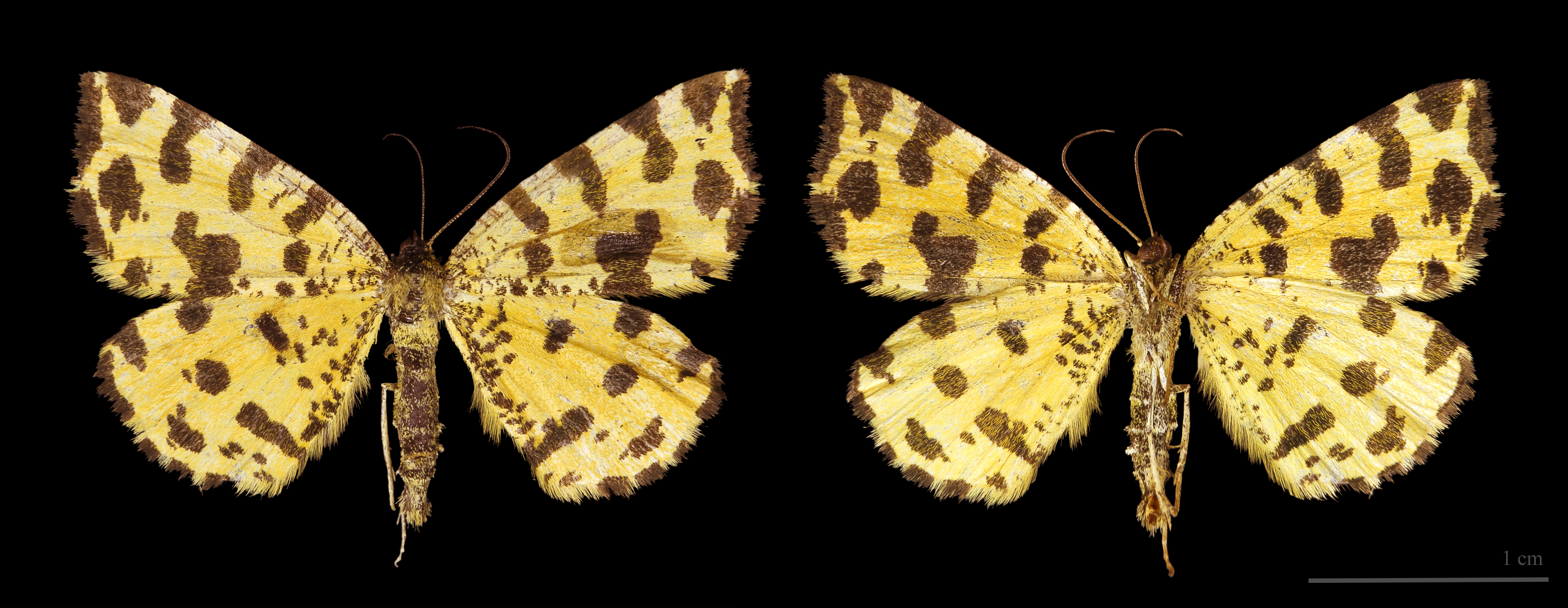
Pseudopanthera macularia

Pseudopanthera macularia, the speckled yellow, is a moth of the family Geometridae. It is found throughout Europe, from the Iberian Peninsula through Western and Central Europe and the British Isles and Russia to the Urals. Its range extends North to South Fennoscandia, in the South from the Western Mediterranean islands and Italy and the Balkan Peninsula to the Black Sea region and the Caucasus. From Asia Minor it extends East through the rest of the Palearctic to Transbaikal.

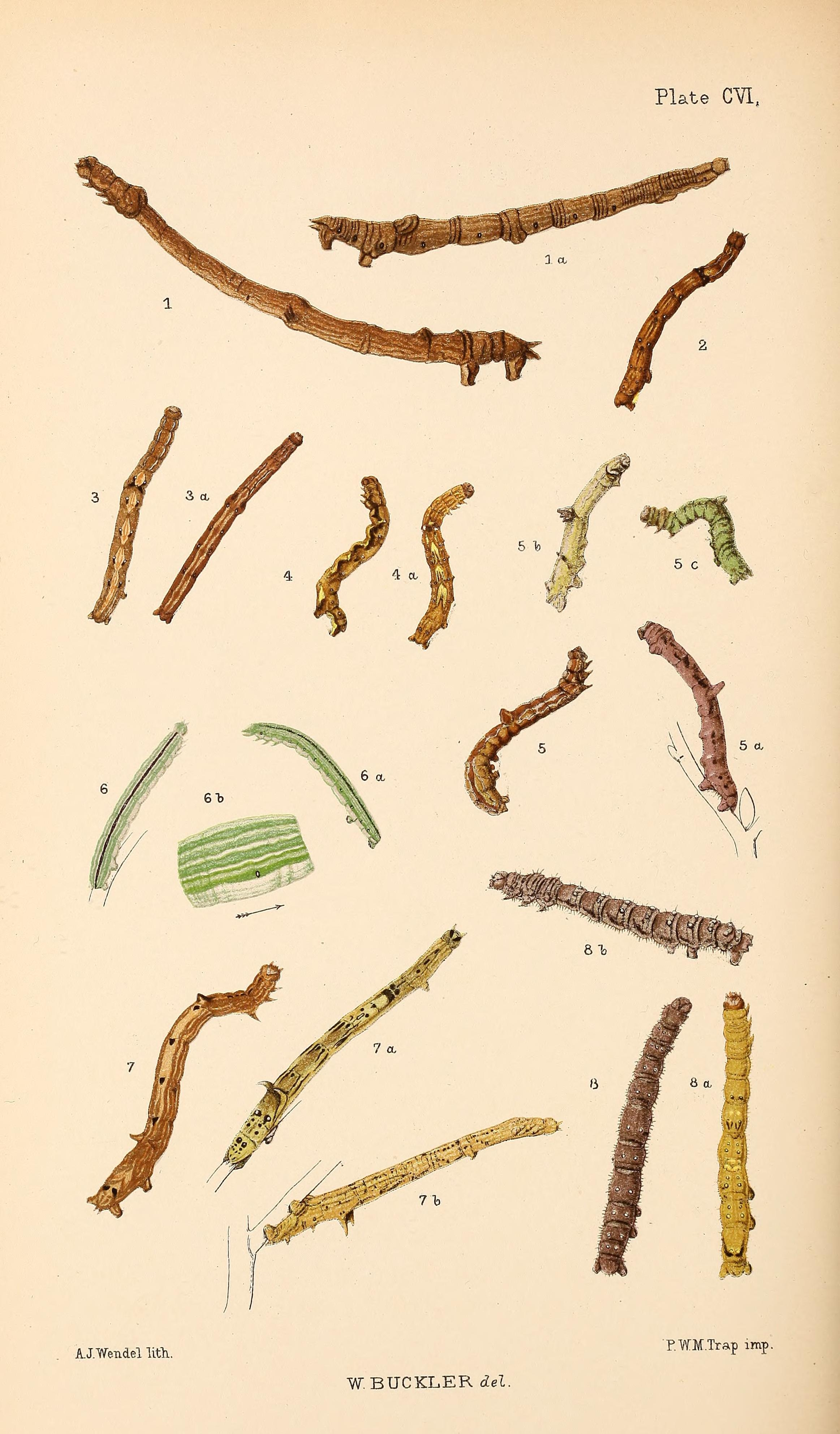
Larva Fig.6,6a,b

The wingspan is 23–28 mm."Easily known by having the lines or bands altogether broken up into large irregular spots. Underside the same. Only in ab. transversaria Krulik, are the spots, at least on the forewing, joined into bands. — In ab. viridimaculata Ckll. the spots are olive-green. — ab. albicans Ob. has the ground-colour whitish. — ab. quadrimaculata Hatchett is a rare form with the spots obsolete except the 4 at costal margin of forewing. — ab. fuscaria Stgr. (18 c) is another rare form, fuscous throughout. — meridionalis Galvagni from Gorz and the Southern Tyrol, has less black dusting, the black spots small. The larva is green, with white lines and stripes and a shining green head.

The larva mainly feeds on woodsage, (Teucrium scorodonia) from July to September. The moth is common in woodland and flies in daylight, from April to the beginning of July often in numbers.
