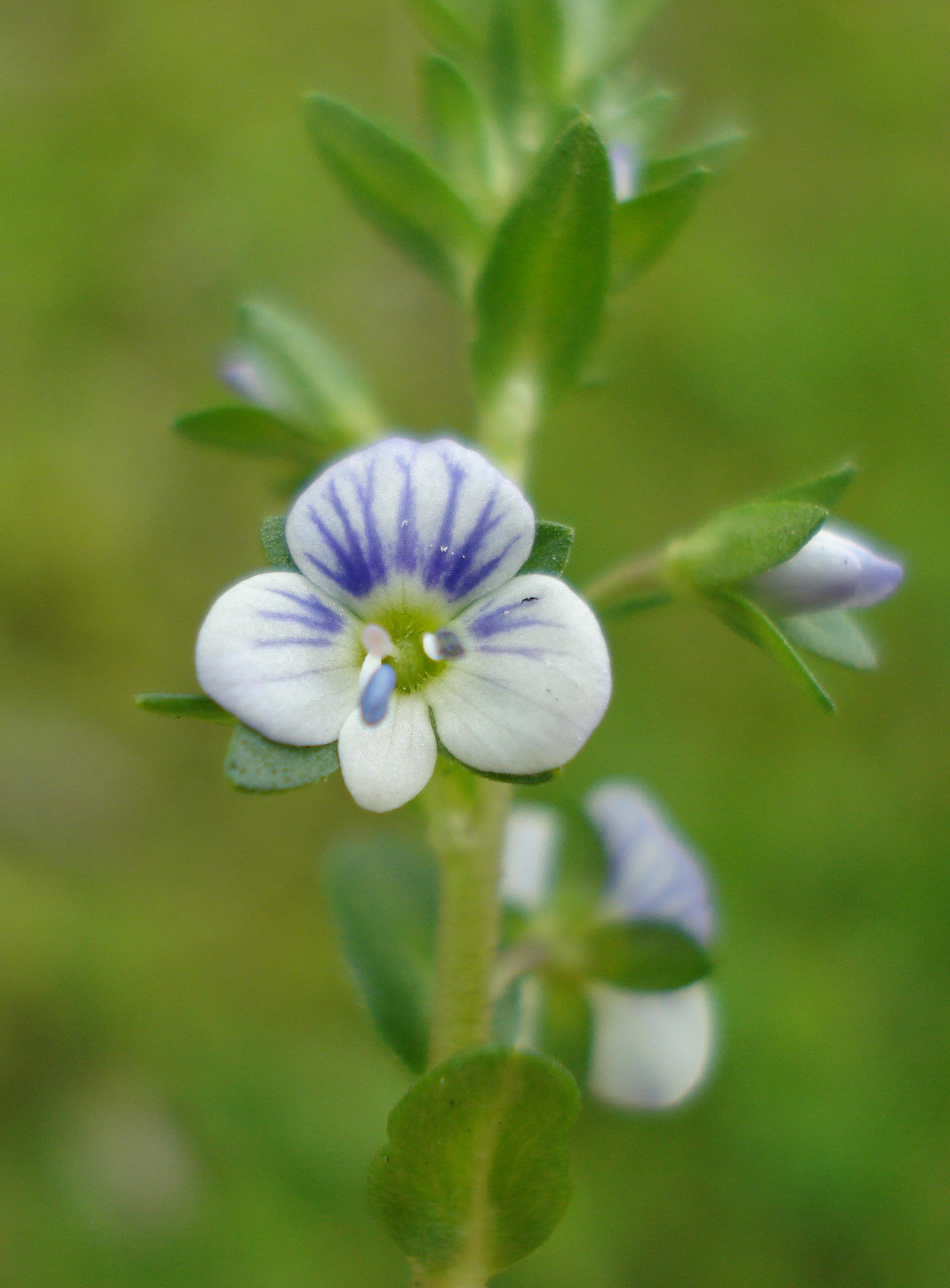
- V. s. var. serpyllifolia
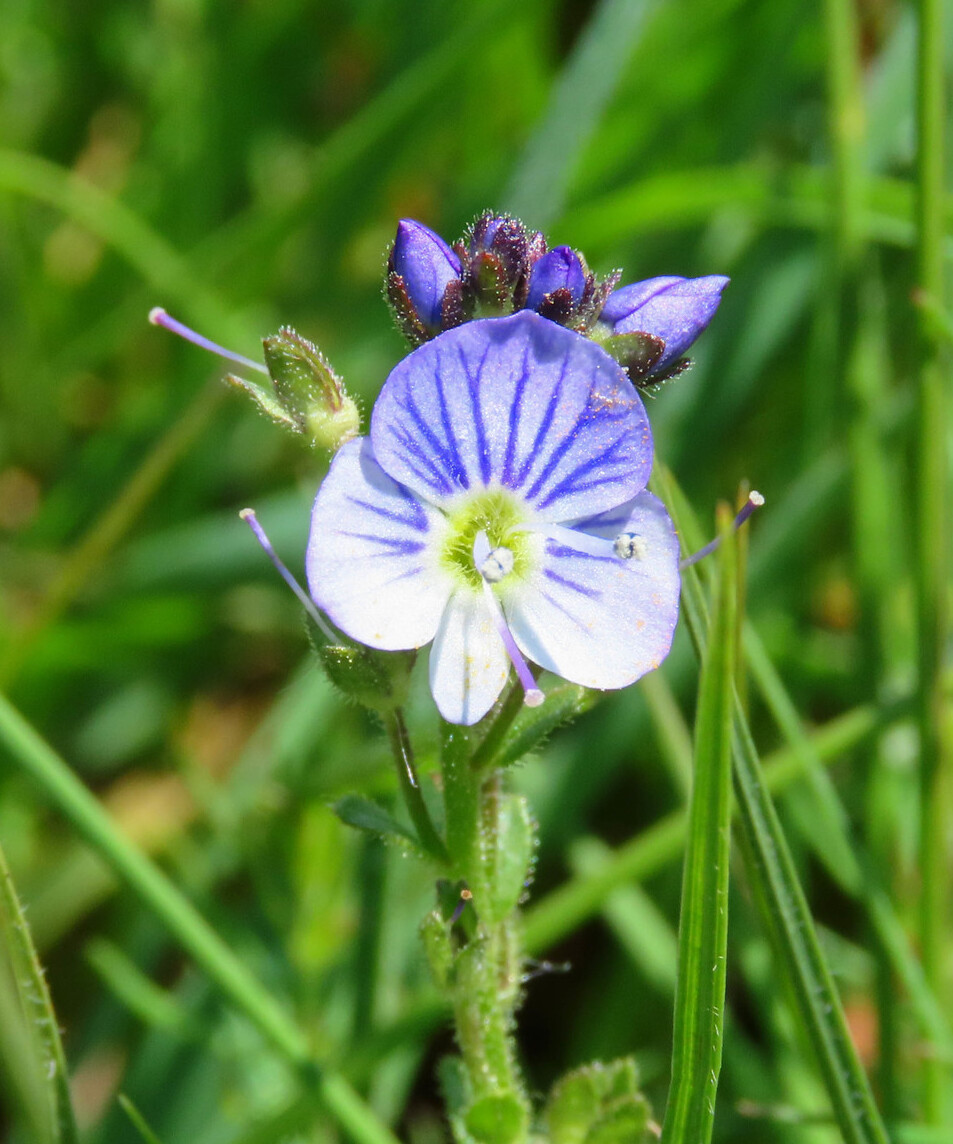
- V. s. var. humifusa

Scientific classification
- Kingdom: Plantae
- Clade: Tracheophytes
- Clade: Angiosperms
- Clade: Eudicots
- Clade: Asterids
- Order: Lamiales
- Family: Plantaginaceae
- Genus: Veronica
- Species: V. serpyllifolia

Binomial name
- Veronica serpyllifolia L.

= Veronica serpyllifolia =

Species of flowering plant

Veronica serpyllifolia, the thyme-leaved speedwell or thymeleaf speedwell, is a perennial flowering plant in the plantain family. The species as a whole is native mostly to Eurasia & North America, and has three variants with their individual ranges; var. serpyllifolia has particularly spread beyond its native range.

== Description ==
Veronica serpyllifolia L. initially grows low to the ground then will start to grow upright. The leaves are borne on creeping stems. Roots grow from leaf axils. This plant can be hard to spot as it is relatively small and grows in patches which can be covered by grass. They are more noticeable when they bloom. The prostrate stems bear erect flowering branches up to 20 cm (7.9 in) high.

The first leaves of the seedling have no petiole, are hairless, and have a smooth margin. The leaves are oval, and the lower leaves have smooth margins. The upper leaves are smaller than the lower. The leaves are opposite, with the lower leaves having relatively short stalks, while the higher or upper leaves are stalkless (lack petioles).

The flowers are small, white, and have dark purple marks on their petals. They have four petals, and a corolla 6 mm (0.24 in) wide. They grow in racemes from the leaf axils. Their stems grow from nodes on the rhizomes, allowing them to grow in thick mats close to the ground.

Veronica serpyllifolia reproduces either by dropping its seeds or by rooting stems. Their root systems are both fibrous and rhizomatous. The fruits are obcordate (heart shaped) capsules, mostly flattened, and have a pubescent outer layer with a notched tip. They are approximately 2.5–3.5 mm (0.098–0.138 in) long. The fruit is lined with hairs and the seeds on the inside of the capsule are also flattened. Once the capsules are mature, they open to release many small seeds.

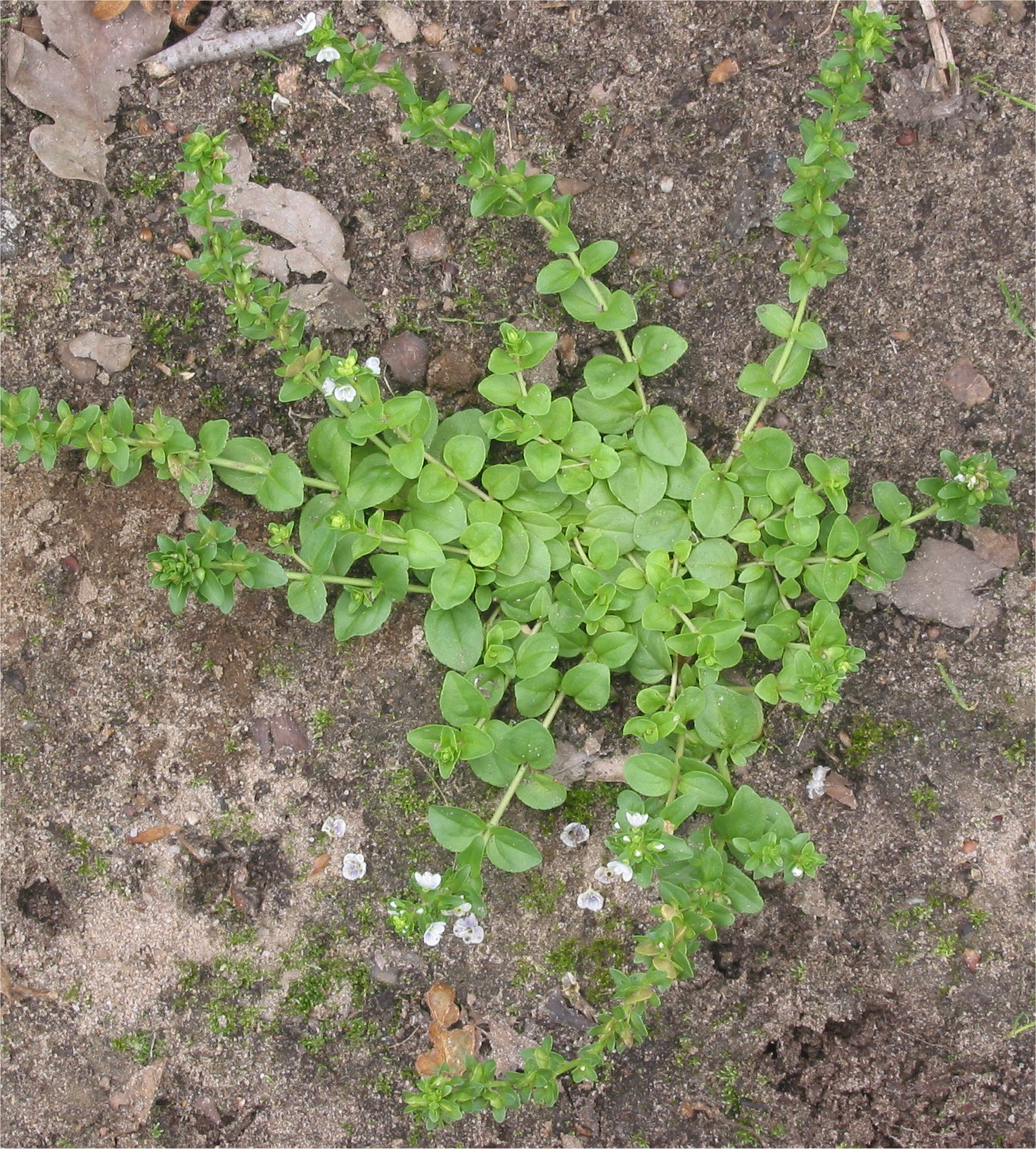
V. serpyllifolia can grow in low mats.

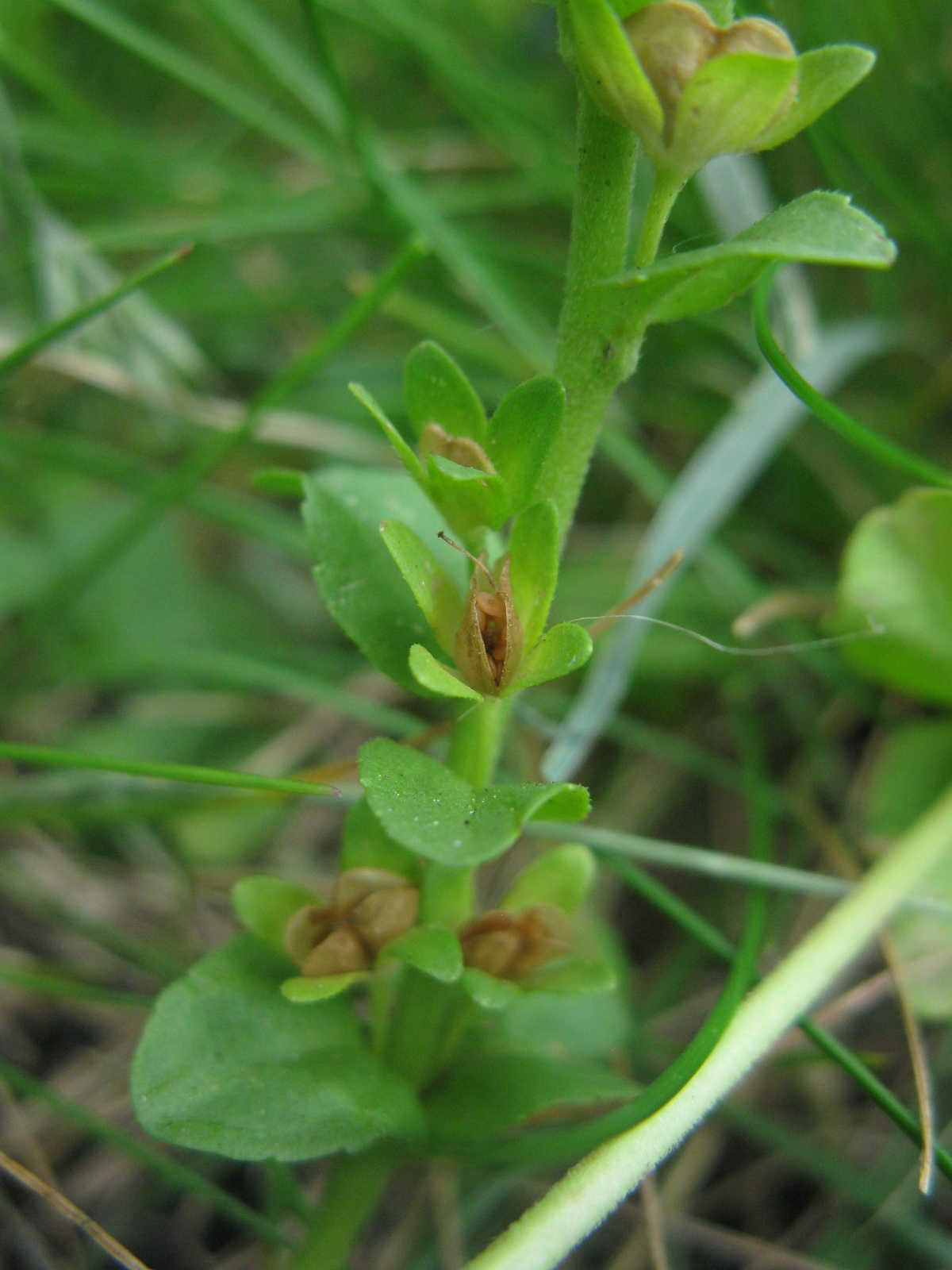
V. serpyllifolia seed capsules

== Distribution ==
Veronica serpyllifolia L. var. serpyllifolia, commonly known as thyme-leaved speedwell, is native mostly to Eurasia and is introduced to North America and New Zealand. As of 2010, it is known to occur in 37 of the US states and is considered a weed in North America. It frequently occurs in open grass lands and cultivated areas on lighter soils. It grows in full sunlight, tolerates partial shade, and thrives in a moist environment during the spring. It can grow at elevations up to 3,300 m (10,800 ft).

== Ecology ==
Pollinators of V. serpyllifolia include flies and bees that visit the flowers for nectar. The seeds can be dispersed by attaching onto the wings of birds or the fur of some animals. Veronica serpyllifolia seeds were found in cattle dung, thus cattle or other grazers are likely important dispersers of the plant.

== Weed control ==
Veronica serpyllifolia grows in patches and is commonly recognized as a weed of turf grass. Ways to remove V. serpyllifolia from lawns are by mowing and watering and fertilizing lawns properly, this hinders the weeds ability to compete. The use of herbicide is recommended for the complete removal of this species from a yard or a lawn. Picking the weed and pulling the roots out can work but this risks the further dispersal of seeds on the lawn. One study showed that wiping herbicides onto the plant rather than spraying it helps to better remove of the species. It stated that wiping method worked better and the spray on method caused harm to other grasses surrounding the weeds.

== Synonyms ==
Synonyms of Veronica serpyllifolia include: Veronicastrum serpyllifolium (L.) Fourr. and Veronica serpyllifolia L. var. nummularioides Lecoq & Lamotte.

== Wetland plant status ==
Veronica serpyllifolia is able to grow in both jurisdictional wetlands and non-wetlands. According to the wetland plant classification system in the United States, V. serpyllifolia is classified as a facultative (FAC) to obligate (OBL) wetland plant.
