= Headley, Basingstoke and Deane =

Village in Hampshire, England

Coordinates: 51.356°N 1.258°W

Headley
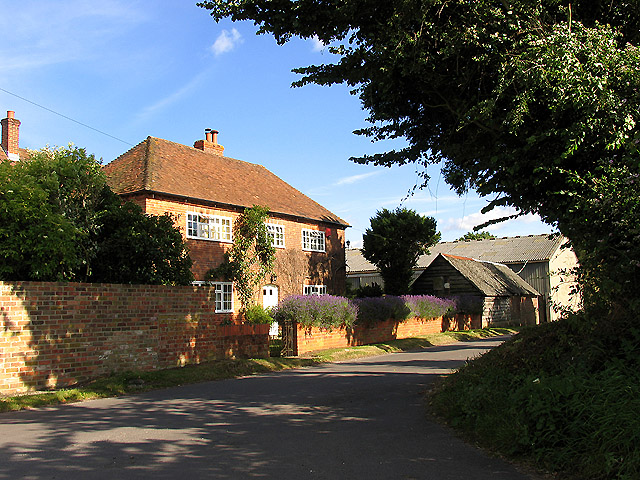
- Waits Farm, Headley

- Location within Hampshire
- OS grid reference: SU5162
- Civil parish: Ashford Hill with Headley
- District: Basingstoke and Deane
- Shire county: Hampshire
- Region: South East
- Country: England
- Sovereign state: United Kingdom
- Post town: THATCHAM
- Postcode district: RG19
- Dialling code: 01635
- Police: Hampshire and Isle of Wight
- Fire: Hampshire and Isle of Wight
- Ambulance: South Central
- UK Parliament: North West Hampshire

Headley is a village in Hampshire, England. It is close to the county boundary with Berkshire and about 4 miles (6.4 km) south-east of Newbury.

== Governance ==
The village of Headley is part of the civil parish of Ashford Hill with Headley and is part of the Kingsclere ward of the Borough of Basingstoke and Deane.
