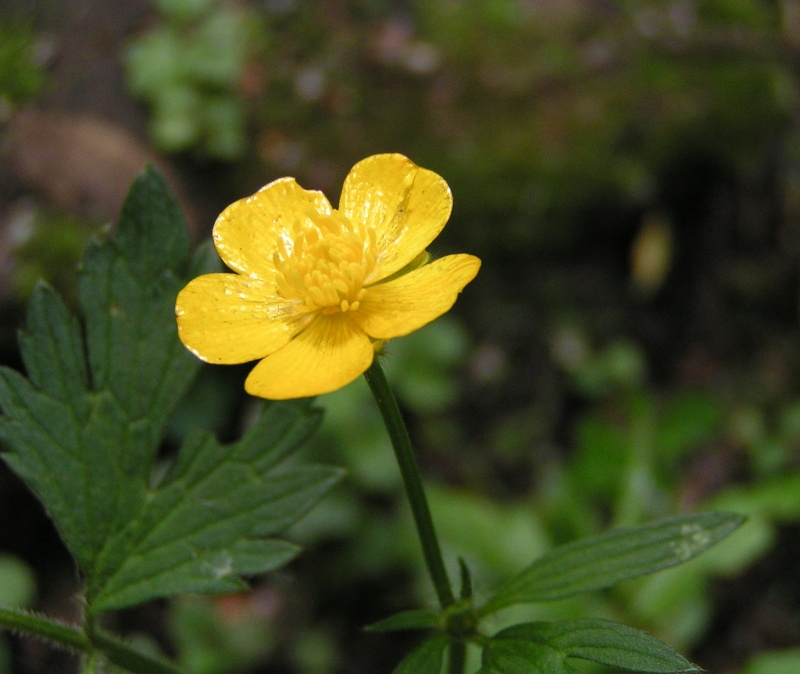

Conservation status
- Least Concern (IUCN 3.1)

Scientific classification
- Kingdom: Plantae
- Clade: Tracheophytes
- Clade: Angiosperms
- Clade: Eudicots
- Order: Ranunculales
- Family: Ranunculaceae
- Genus: Ranunculus
- Species: R. repens

Binomial name
- Ranunculus repens L.

= Ranunculus repens =

Species of plant in the buttercup family

Ranunculus repens, the creeping buttercup, is a flowering plant in the buttercup family Ranunculaceae, native to Europe, Asia and northwestern Africa. It is also called creeping crowfoot and (along with restharrow) sitfast.

== Description ==
It is a herbaceous, stoloniferous perennial plant growing up to 50 cm (20 in) tall. It produces prostrate, creeping stolons that root at the nodes and give rise to new plantlets, as well as more or less erect flowering stems. The leaves are trifoliate, with each leaflet typically three-lobed, and are dark green; pale markings may be present but are variable among individuals and populations. It is particularly associated with moist to wet soils, but shows tolerance of both persistently damp and more freely draining conditions, with population-level differences in growth form and flood response reported between habitats.

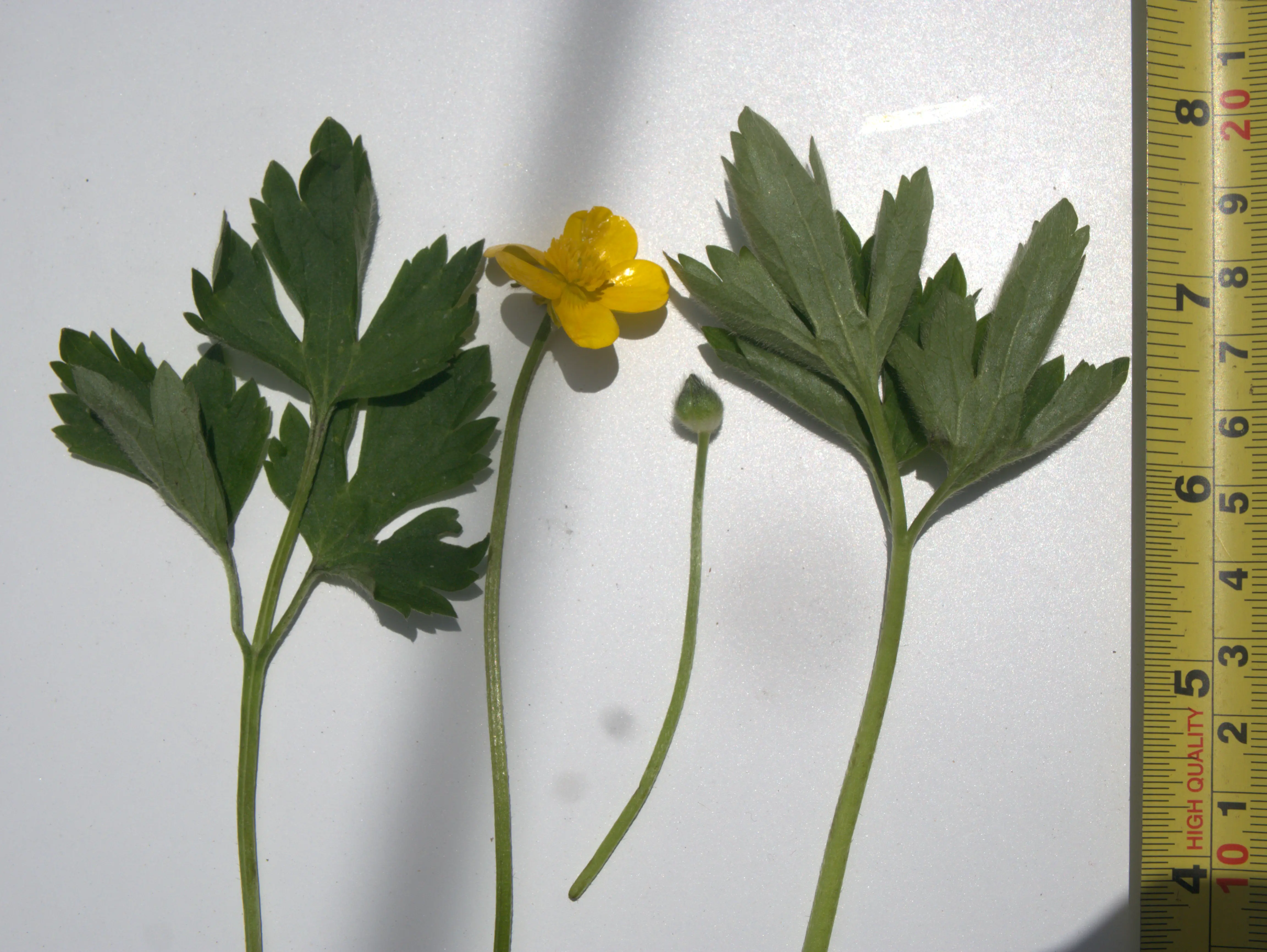
Elements of Ranunculus repens

The basal leaves are compound, borne on a 4–20 cm (1 1/2–8 in) long petiole and divided into three broad leaflets 1.5–8 cm (1/2–3 1/4 in) long, shallowly to deeply lobed, each of which is stalked, distinguishing the species from Ranunculus acris in which the terminal leaflet is sessile. The leaves higher on the stems are smaller, with narrower leaflets and may be simple and lanceolate. Both the stems and the leaves are finely hairy. The flowers are golden yellow, glossy, and 2–3 cm (3/4–1 1/4 in) diameter, usually with five petals, and the flower stem is finely grooved. The gloss is caused by the smooth upper surface of the petal that acts like a mirror; the gloss aids in attracting pollinating insects and thermoregulation of the flower's reproductive organs. The fruit is a cluster of achenes 2.5–4 mm (3/32–5/32 in) long.

== Habitat ==
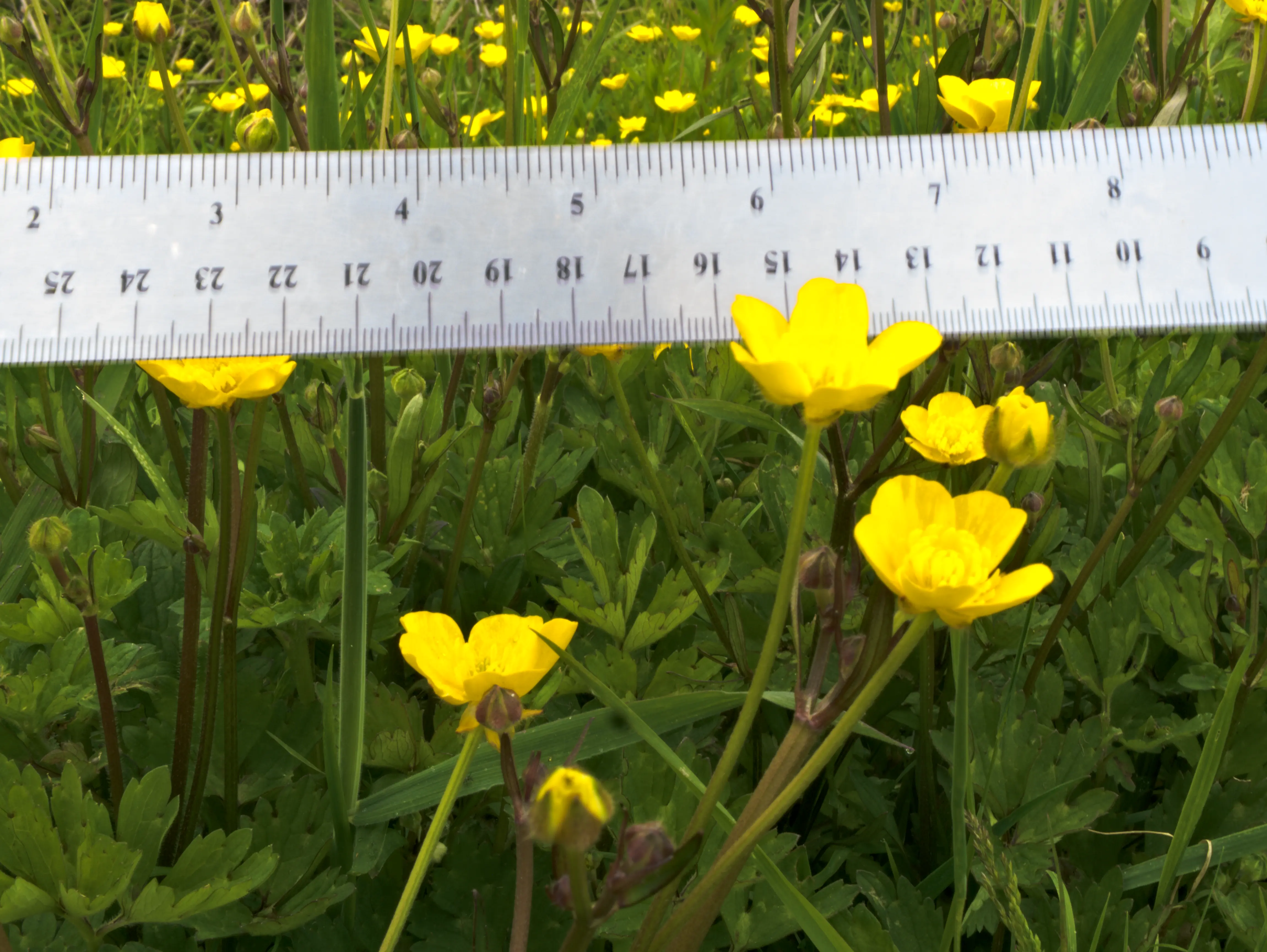
Flowers, stems, buds and foliage in spring

It is a very common weed of agricultural land and gardens, spreading quickly by its rooting stolons and resisting removal with a deeply anchored filamentous root ball. In Ireland: very common in damp places, ditches and flooded areas.

== Cultivation and uses ==
Creeping buttercup was sold in many parts of the world as an ornamental plant, and has now become an invasive species in many parts of the world.

Like most buttercups, Ranunculus repens is poisonous, although these poisons are lost when dried with hay. The taste of buttercups is acrid, so cattle avoid eating them. The plants then take advantage of the cropped ground around them to spread their stolons. Creeping buttercup also is spread through the transportation of hay.

Other ranunculus species were traditionally used medicinally by the Indigenous peoples of the Pacific Northwest Coast. Fresh leaves or other plant parts were chewed, crushed, or mashed and applied as poultices for boils, sores, cuts, swellings, muscular aches, rheumatic pain, and respiratory complaints. Treatments were limited to topical use as the sap of fresh buttercups contains irritant compounds that can cause dermatitis and blistering.

== Etymology ==
Ranunculus is a diminutive of 'rana', meaning 'little frog'. This name is in reference to the amphibious habitat of many Ranunculus species.

Repens means 'creeping' or 'stoloniferous'.
