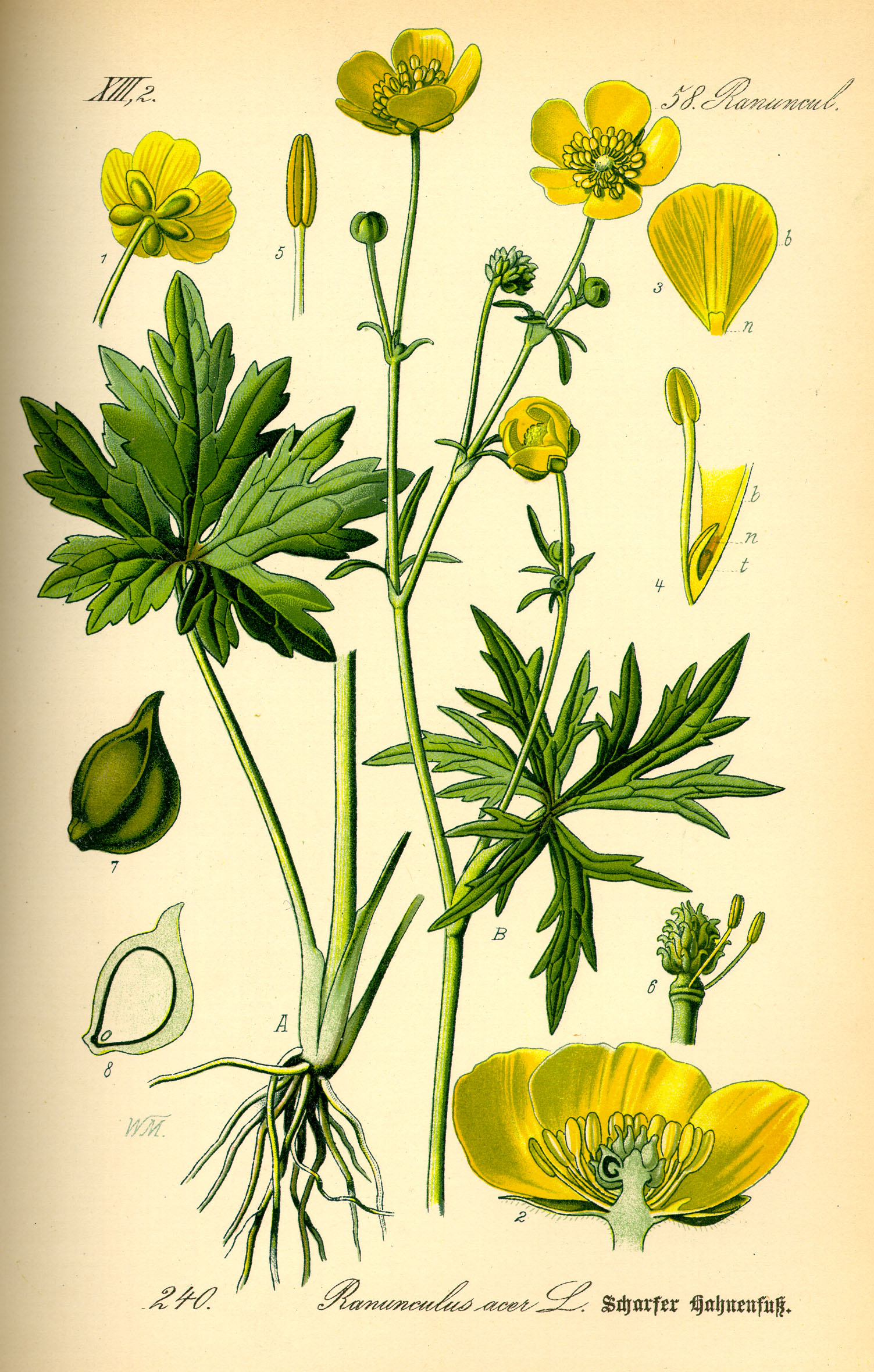

Scientific classification
- Kingdom: Plantae
- Clade: Tracheophytes
- Clade: Angiosperms
- Clade: Eudicots
- Order: Ranunculales
- Family: Ranunculaceae
- Genus: Ranunculus
- Species: R. acris

Binomial name
- Ranunculus acris L.

Synonyms
- R. acer auct.; R. stevenii Beck

= Ranunculus acris =

Species of flowering plant in the buttercup family

Ranunculus acris is a species of flowering plant in the family Ranunculaceae, and is one of the more common buttercups across Europe and temperate Eurasia. Common names include meadow buttercup, tall buttercup, common buttercup and giant buttercup.

== Description ==
Floral diagram of Ranunculus acris. The light green ovals denote nectaries.

Ranunculus acris is a herbaceous perennial plant that grows to a height of 30–100 cm (12–39 in), with ungrooved flowing stems bearing glossy yellow flowers about 25 mm across. There are five overlapping petals borne above five green sepals held upwards against the petals, that turn yellow as the flower matures. It has numerous stamens inserted below the ovary. The leaves are compound, with finely cut, hairy, leaflets. Unlike Ranunculus repens, the terminal leaflet is sessile. As with other members of the genus, the numerous seeds are borne as achenes.

The rare autumn buttercup (R. aestivalis) is sometimes treated as a variety of this species.

The juice of the plant is semi-poisonous to livestock, causing blistering.

== Distribution ==
The plant is native to Eurasia, but has been introduced across much of the world so that it now has a circumpolar distribution. It is a naturalized species and often a weed in parts of North America, but it is probably native in Alaska and Greenland. In New Zealand it is a serious pasture weed costing the dairy industry hundreds of millions of dollars. It has become one of the few pasture weeds that has developed a resistance to herbicides.

== Ecology ==
R. acris is a species characteristic of grazed or mown neutral grassland communities, tending to occupy areas where drainage conditions are intermediate between those favoured by R. bulbosus in drier soils, and R. repens in wetter soils. Its abundance is said to be an indicator of grassland age and continuity but does not appear to be a good competitor in species-rich communities dominated by tall grasses.

The flower buds begin developing in late summer in the year before flowering. Floral development is promoted by low winter temperatures, and the plant passes the winter in a rosette form with small green leaves that appear to resist the ravages of frost. Reproduction occurs from seeds and short thick rhizomes that can split to form daughter plants

== Cultivation ==
In horticulture the species may be regarded as a troublesome weed, colonising lawns and paths. However, it may be a welcome feature of wildflower meadows. The double-flowered cultivar R. acris 'Flore Pleno' has gained the Royal Horticultural Society's Award of Garden Merit.

== Toxicity ==
Oils in the plant, probably present in the leaves and stems, contain the glycoside ranunculin, which when ingested can cause abdominal pains and intestinal disorders. When eaten by animals, the buttercups have caused blistering of the tongue and lips, diarrhea and blindness. Other symptoms of poisoning include ventricular fibrillation and respiratory failure.

== Uses by Native Americans ==
The Abenaki smash the flowers and leaves and sniff them for headaches. The Bella Coola apply a poultice of pounded roots to boils. The Mi'kmaq use the leaves for headaches. The Innu inhale the crushed leaves for headaches.

The Cherokee use it as a poultice for abscesses, use an infusion for oral thrush, and use the juice as a sedative. They also cook the leaves and eat them as greens.

The Haudenosaunee apply a poultice of the smashed plant to the chest for pains and for colds, take an infusion of the roots for diarrhea, and apply a poultice of plant fragments with another plant to the skin for excess water in the blood.
