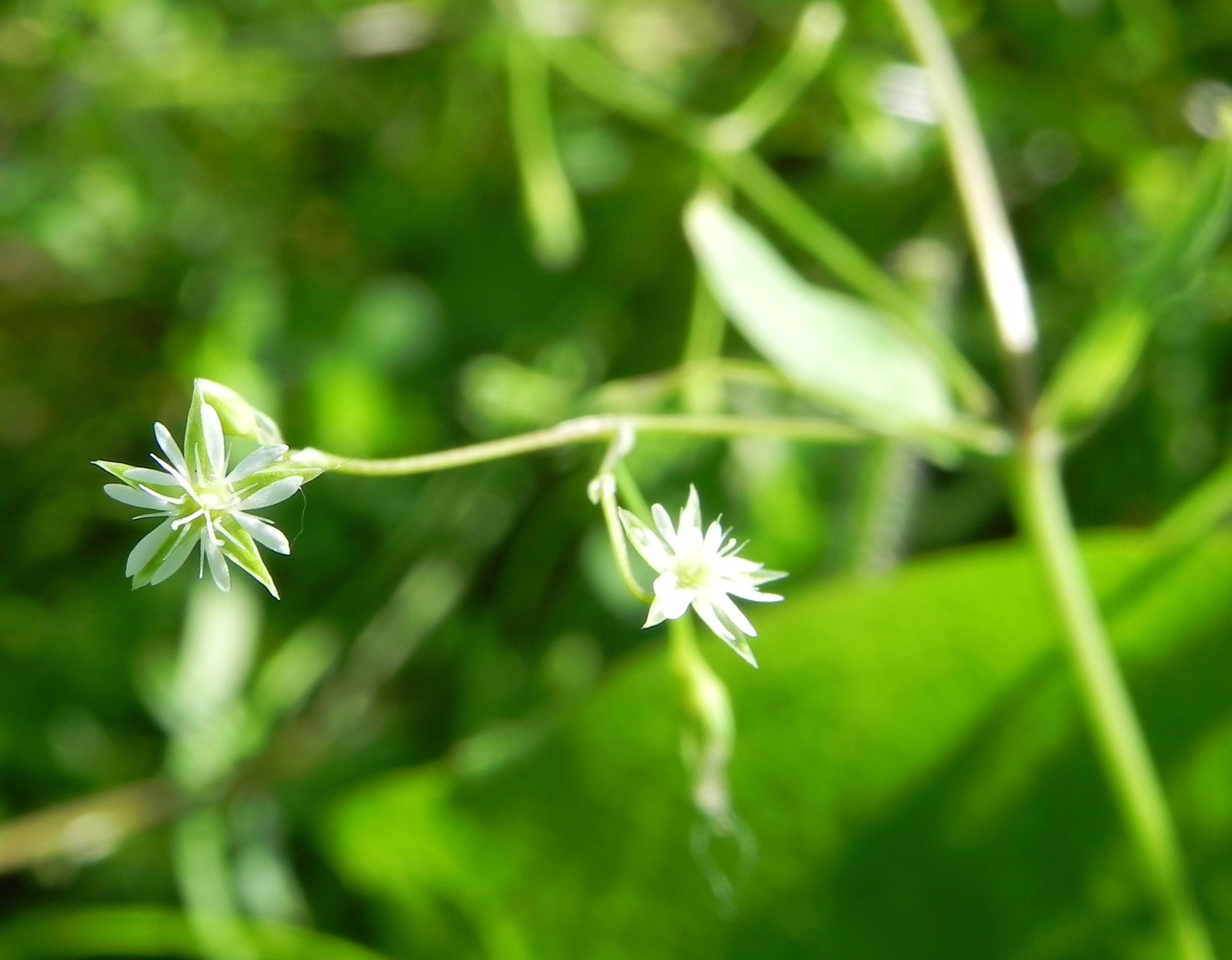

Conservation status
- Secure (NatureServe)

Scientific classification
- Kingdom: Plantae
- Clade: Tracheophytes
- Clade: Angiosperms
- Clade: Eudicots
- Order: Caryophyllales
- Family: Caryophyllaceae
- Genus: Stellaria
- Species: S. alsine

Binomial name
- Stellaria alsine Grimm

Synonyms
- Stellaria uliginosa Murray

= Stellaria alsine =

Species of flowering plant in the carnation family

Stellaria alsine, the bog stitchwort, is a species of herbaceous perennial flowering plant in the carnation family Caryophyllaceae. It grows in bogs and marshes in Europe and parts of North America.

== Description ==
Bog stitchwort is a rhizomatous perennial plant, with smooth, four-angled stems up to 40 cm (16 in) tall. Its leaves are opposite and narrow, up to 13 mm (0.51 in) long, with untoothed margins but a few marginal hairs towards the leaf-base. The flowers are borne in cymes of 1–5, arising from the axils of the higher leaves. Each flower is around 6 mm (0.24 in) in diameter, with 10 stamens, 3 stigmas, five lanceolate–triangular, green-coloured but scarious-margined sepals, and five slightly shorter white petals. The petals are divided into two almost to their base with the two halves angled apart, so that the two halves of each petal lie over parts of adjacent sepals.

== Ecology ==
Bog stitchwort grows in various types of wetland habitat; in the British Isles, it is especially characteristic of areas poached by cattle. It flowers in spring and early summer.

== Distribution ==
Bog stitchwort is widespread in central and western Europe, but is rarer in eastern and southern Europe and the northern half of Scandinavia. It is thought to be native to eastern parts of North America, but to be an introduced species in the Pacific Northwest. It has also become naturalised in South America, in Asia, where it has become a weed of rice fields, and on the Kerguelen Islands in the southern Indian Ocean, where it is an aggressive invasive species.

== Taxonomy ==
Stellaria alsine was first described by Johann Friedrich Carl Grimm in 1767. The species has also been widely referred to under the junior synonym Stellaria uliginosa.
