= Tall meadow-rue =

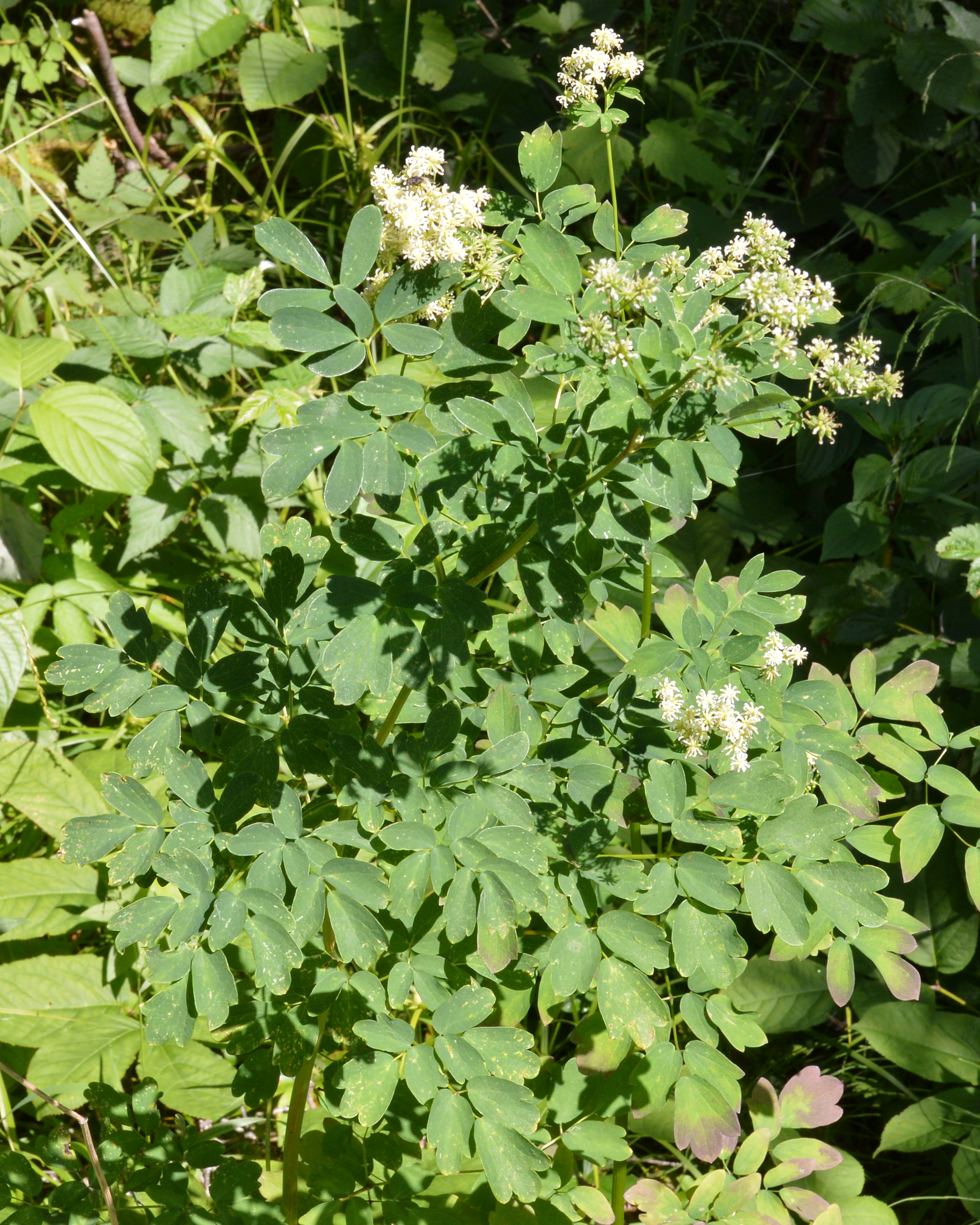
Tall Meadow-Rue (Thalictrum pubescens)

Tall meadow-rue or tall meadow rue may refer to several species of plant in the genus Thalictrum, including:

- Thalictrum dasycarpum
- Thalictrum pubescens
- Thalictrum polycarpum
