= List of Canadian plants by genus =

This is a partial list of the plant species considered native to Canada.

Many of the plants seen in Canada were introduced, either intentionally or accidentally. For these plants, see List of introduced species to Canada.

N indicates native and X indicates exotic. Those plants whose status is unknown are marked with a ?.

Due to Canada's biodiversity, this page is divided.

== Ab ==
- Abies
  - N Abies amabilis – Pacific silver fir, amabilis fir
  - N Abies balsamea – balsam fir
  - N Abies grandis – grand fir
  - N Abies lasiocarpa – subalpine fir
- Abutilon
  - X Abutilon theophrasti – velvetleaf, butterprint, Indian mallow

== Ac ==
- Acalypha
  - N Acalypha virginica – Virginia copperleaf, Virginia threeseed mercury
- Acanthospermum
  - X Acanthospermum hispidum – hispid greenstripe
- Acer
  - X Acer campestre – hedge maple, field maple
  - N Acer negundo – Manitoba maple, box-elder, ashleaf maple
  - N Acer nigrum – black maple, black sugar maple, rock maple
  - N Acer pensylvanicum – striped maple, moose maple, goosefoot maple
  - X Acer platanoides – Norway maple, Schwedler maple, crimson king maple
  - X Acer pseudoplatanus – sycamore maple, Scottish maple, great maple
  - N Acer rubrum – red maple, swamp maple, scarlet maple
  - N Acer saccharinum – silver maple, soft maple, white maple, silverleaf maple, river maple
  - N Acer saccharum – sugar maple, hard maple
  - N Acer spicatum – mountain maple
  - X Acer tataricum subsp. ginnala – Amur maple, ginnala maple
  - N Acer × freemanii (A. rubrum × A. saccharinum) – Freeman's maple
- Achillea
  - N Achillea alpina – Siberian yarrow, many-flowered yarrow
  - X Achillea filipendulina – fernleaf yarrow
  - N Achillea millefolium subsp. borealis – northern yarrow
  - N Achillea millefolium subsp. lanulosa – woolly yarrow
  - X Achillea millefolium subsp. millefolium – common yarrow, milfoil
  - X Achillea ptarmica – false sneezewort, white tansy, sneezewort yarrow, pearl yarrow
- Aconitum
  - X Aconitum napellus – garden monk's-hood, helmet flower, Venus' chariot, aconite
  - X Aconitum variegatum – Manchurian monk's-hood
  - X Aconitum × cammarum (A. napellus × A. variegatum) – hybrid monk's-hood, two-coloured wolf's-bane
- Acorus
  - N Acorus americanus – sweetflag
  - X Acorus calamus – European sweetflag
- Acroptilon
  - X Acroptilon repens – Russian knapweed
- Actaea
  - N Actaea pachypoda – white baneberry, doll's-eyes
  - N Actaea rubra – red baneberry
  - N Actaea × ludovici (A. pachypoda × A. rubra) – hybrid baneberry

== Ad ==
- Adenocaulon
  - N Adenocaulon bicolor – trail-plant, pathfinder
- Adiantum
  - N Adiantum aleuticum – western maidenhair fern
  - N Adiantum capillus-veneris – southern maidenhair fern
  - N Adiantum pedatum – northern maidenhair fern, five-finger fern
  - N Adiantum viridimontanum – Green Mountain maidenhair fern
- Adlumia
  - N Adlumia fungosa – Allegheny vine, climbing fumitory
- Adonis
  - X Adonis annua – pheasant's-eye
- Adoxa
  - N Adoxa moschatellina – moschatel, muskroot, townhall clock

== Ae ==
- Aegopodium
  - X Aegopodium podagraria – goutweed, snow-on-the-mountain, goat's-foot, ground elder, bishop's weed
- Aesculus
  - N Aesculus glabra – Ohio buckeye, fœtid buckeye
  - X Aesculus hippocastanum – common horsechestnut
- Aethusa
  - X Aethusa cynapium – fool's-parsley

== Ag ==
- Agalinis
  - N Agalinis gattingeri – Gattinger's agalinis Endangered
  - N Agalinis paupercula – small-flowered purple false-foxglove, small-flowered agalinis
  - N Agalinis purpurea – purple false foxglove, large purple agalinis
  - N Agalinis skinneriana – Skinner's agalinis Endangered
  - N Agalinis tenuifolia – slenderleaf purple false foxglove, slenderleaf agalinis
- Agastache
  - N Agastache foeniculum – anise hyssop, blue giant hyssop
  - N Agastache nepetoides – yellow giant hyssop
  - N Agastache scrophulariifolia – purple giant hyssop
- Agoseris
  - N Agoseris glauca – pale false-dandelion, prairie agoseris, pale agoseris, pale goat-chicory, large-flowered false-dandelion
- Agrimonia
  - X Agrimonia eupatoria – medicinal agrimony, church steeples, European groovebur
  - N Agrimonia gryposepala – tall hairy agrimony, tall hairy groovebur
  - N Agrimonia parviflora – smallflower groovebur, harvestlice agrimony
  - N Agrimonia pubescens – soft groovebur, soft agrimony
  - N Agrimonia striata – woodland agrimony, grooved agrimony
- Agropyron
  - X Agropyron cristatum – crested wheatgrass
- Agrostemma
  - X Agrostemma githago – common corncockle
- Agrostis
  - ? Agrostis canina – brown bentgrass (Note: According to Plants of the World Online, it is introduced.)
  - X Agrostis capillaris – colonial bentgrass, browntop, Prince Edward Island bentgrass, Rhode Island bentgrass
  - X Agrostis gigantea – black bentgrass, redtop
  - N Agrostis hyemalis – winter bentgrass, ticklegrass
  - N Agrostis mertensii – northern bentgrass
  - N Agrostis perennans – upland bentgrass, perennial bentgrass
  - N Agrostis scabra – rough bentgrass, tickle grass, rough hairgrass, twin bentgrass
  - X Agrostis stolonifera – creeping bentgrass, spreading bentgrass

== Ai ==
- Ailanthus
  - X Ailanthus altissima – tree-of-Heaven, Chinese sumac, stinktree, varnish tree

== Aj ==
- Ajuga
  - X Ajuga genevensis – Geneva bugleweed
  - X Ajuga reptans – carpet bugleweed, common bugle, creeping bugleweed

== Al ==
- Alcea
  - X Alcea pallida – pale hollyhock
  - X Alcea rosea – hollyhock
- Alchemilla
  - X Alchemilla filicaulis – thin-stemmed lady's-mantle
  - X Alchemilla monticola – hairy lady's-mantle
- Aletris
  - N Aletris farinosa – colicroot Threatened
- Alisma
  - N Alisma gramineum – grass-leaved water-plantain
  - N Alisma subcordatum – southern water-plantain
  - N Alisma triviale – northern water-plantain
- Alliaria
  - X Alliaria petiolata – garlic mustard, hedge garlic
- Allium
  - N Allium burdickii – narrow-leaved wild leek
  - N Allium canadense – Canada wild onion, meadow garlic, meadow onion
  - N Allium cernuum – nodding onion
  - X Allium oleraceum – wild garlic
  - X Allium sativum – garlic
  - X Allium schoenoprasum var. schoenoprasum – chives
  - N Allium schoenoprasum var. sibiricum – Siberian chives
  - N Allium stellatum – prairie onion, wild onion
  - N Allium tricoccum – wild leek, small wild leek, ramps
  - X Allium vineale – field garlic
- Alnus
  - X Alnus glutinosa – black alder, European alder
  - N Alnus incana – grey alder, white alder, hoary alder, speckled alder
  - N Alnus viridis – green alder, mountain alder, American green alder, Siberian alder, Sitka alder
- Alopecurus
  - N Alopecurus aequalis – shortawn foxtail
  - N Alopecurus alpinus – alpine foxtail
  - X Alopecurus geniculatus – water foxtail
  - X Alopecurus pratensis – meadow foxtail
- Althaea
  - X Althaea hirsuta – hairy marsh-mallow
  - X Althaea officinalis – common marsh-mallow
- Alyssum
  - X Alyssum alyssoides – pale alyssum, small alyssum, yellow alyssum, pale madwort
  - X Alyssum murale – yellow-tuft

== Am ==
- Amaranthus
  - X Amaranthus albus – white tumbleweed, tumble pigweed, tumbleweed amaranth
  - X Amaranthus blitoides – prostrate amaranth, prostrate pigweed, matweed
  - X Amaranthus blitum – purple amaranth
  - X Amaranthus cruentus – blood amaranth, purple amaranth, red amaranth, caterpillar amaranth, African spinach
  - X Amaranthus hybridus – smooth amaranth, hybrid amaranth, green pigweed, smooth pigweed, green amaranth
  - X Amaranthus palmeri – Palmer's amaranth
  - X Amaranthus powellii – green amaranth, Powell's smooth amaranth
  - X Amaranthus retroflexus – redroot amaranth, redroot pigweed, wild-beet amaranth, rough pigweed
  - X Amaranthus spinosus – spiny amaranth
  - N Amaranthus tuberculatus – roughfruit amaranth, roughfruit waterhemp, tall waterhemp, tall pigweed
- Ambrosia
  - N Ambrosia artemisiifolia – common ragweed, annual ragweed, annual bur-sage
  - N Ambrosia psilostachya – perennial ragweed, western ragweed, naked-spike ambrosia, Cuman ragweed
  - N Ambrosia trifida – giant ragweed, great ragweed, buffalo-weed, skeleton-leaf bur-sage
- Amelanchier
  - N Amelanchier alnifolia – Saskatoonberry, northwestern serviceberry
  - N Amelanchier arborea – downy serviceberry, downy juneberry, common serviceberry
  - N Amelanchier bartramiana – mountain juneberry, Bartram's shadbush, Bartram's chuckleypear
  - N Amelanchier canadensis – Canada serviceberry, swamp shadbush, thicket serviceberry
  - N Amelanchier humilis – low serviceberry, running serviceberry
  - N Amelanchier laevis – smooth juneberry, Allegheny serviceberry, smooth chuckleypear
  - N Amelanchier sanguinea var. gaspensis – Gaspé roundleaf juneberry
  - N Amelanchier sanguinea var. sanguinea – roundleaf juneberry, roundleaf serviceberry, Fernald's chuckleypear
  - N Amelanchier stolonifera – running serviceberry, running juneberry, running chuckleypear
  - N Amelanchier × intermedia (A. arborea × A. canadensis) – swamp sugarpear
  - N Amelanchier × neglecta (A. bartramiana × A. laevis) – hybrid juneberry
  - N Amelanchier × quinti-martii (A. arborea × A. bartramiana) – Quint-mart's serviceberry
  - N Amelanchier × wiegandii (A. arborea × A. sanguinea) – Wiegand's serviceberry
- Amerorchis
  - N Amerorchis rotundifolia – small roundleaf orchis, oneleaf orchid
- Ammannia
  - N Ammannia robusta – scarlet ammannia Endangered
- Ammophila
  - N Ammophila breviligulata – American beachgrass
- Amorpha
  - N Amorpha canescens – leadplant, downy indigobush
  - N Amorpha fruticosa – false indigo
- Amphicarpaea
  - N Amphicarpaea bracteata – American hog-peanut

== An ==
- Anagallis
  - X Anagallis arvensis – scarlet pimpernel
- Anaphalis
  - N Anaphalis margaritacea – pearly everlasting
- Anchusa
  - X Anchusa arvensis – small bugloss, annual bugloss, alkanet
  - X Anchusa officinalis – common bugloss
- Andromeda
  - N Andromeda glaucophylla – bog rosemary, rosemary-leaf marsh andromeda
  - N Andromeda polifolia var. jamesiana – James Bay bog rosemary
  - N Andromeda polifolia var. polifolia – northern bog rosemary, marsh holyrose
- Andropogon
  - N Andropogon gerardi – big bluestem, turkeyfoot
  - N Andropogon virginicus – broom-sedge
- Androsace
  - ? Androsace occidentalis – western rock-jasmine
  - N Androsace septentrionalis – pygmy-flower rock-jasmine, northern androsace
- Anemone
  - N Anemone acutiloba – sharp-lobed hepatica, sharp-lobed liverleaf
  - N Anemone americana – round-lobed hepatica, American liverleaf
  - X Anemone blanda
  - N Anemone canadensis – Canada anemone, roundleaf thimbleweed
  - N Anemone cylindrica – long-fruited anemone, thimbleweed, candle anemone, long-headed anemone
  - N Anemone multifida – cutleaf anemone, cliff anemone, early anemone
  - N Anemone parviflora – northern anemone, small-flowered anemone
  - N Anemone patens – pasqueflower, prairie smoke, prairie crocus, cutleaf anemone
  - N Anemone quinquefolia – wood anemone, snow-drops
  - N Anemone richardsonii – Richardson's anemone, yellow anemone
  - N Anemone virginiana – tall thimbleweed, riverbank anemone
- Anethum
  - X Anethum graveolens – dill, Indian dill
- Angelica
  - N Angelica atropurpurea – purplestem angelica, dark-purple alexanders, wild masterwort, great angelica
  - ? Angelica lucida – seabeach angelica, shiny angelica
  - X Angelica sylvestris
  - ? Angelica venenosa – hairy angelica
- Anoda
  - X Anoda cristata – crested anoda
- Antennaria
  - N Antennaria howellii subsp. canadensis – Canada pussytoes
  - N Antennaria howellii subsp. howellii – Howell's pussytoes
  - N Antennaria howellii subsp. neodioica – northern pussytoes, common pussytoes
  - N Antennaria howellii subsp. petaloidea – small pussytoes
  - N Antennaria microphylla – littleleaf pussytoes
  - N Antennaria neglecta – field pussytoes
  - N Antennaria oxyphylla
  - N Antennaria parlinii subsp. fallax – largeleaf pussytoes, deceitful pussytoes
  - N Antennaria parlinii subsp. parlinii – Parlin's pussytoes, smooth pussytoes, plainleaf pussytoes
  - N Antennaria parvifolia – small-leaf pussytoes, Rocky Mountain cudweed, Nuttall's pussytoes
  - N Antennaria pulcherrima – showy pussytoes, handsome pussytoes
  - N Antennaria rosea – rosy pussytoes, pink everlasting
  - N Antennaria subviscosa
- Anthemis
  - X Anthemis arvensis – corn chamomile, field chamomile
  - X Anthemis cotula – mayweed, stinking chamomile, fœtid chamomile, dog fennel, stinking mayweed
  - X Anthemis tinctoria – golden chamomile
- Anthoxanthum
  - X Anthoxanthum odoratum – sweet vernalgrass, sweetgrass
- Anthriscus
  - X Anthriscus cerefolium – common chervil
  - X Anthriscus sylvestris – wild chervil, woodland chervil, cow parsley, beak-chervil
- Anthyllis
  - X Anthyllis vulneraria – kidney vetch, lady's fingers
- Antirrhinum
  - X Antirrhinum majus – common snapdragon
  - X Antirrhinum orontium – lesser snapdragon

== Ap ==
- Apera
  - X Apera interrupta – dense silky bentgrass, interrupted bentgrass, interrupted windgrass
  - X Apera spica-venti – silky bentgrass
- Apios
  - N Apios americana – American groundnut, Indian potato, wild bean, potato-bean
- Aplectrum
  - N Aplectrum hyemale – puttyroot
- Apocynum
  - N Apocynum androsaemifolium – spreading dogbane
  - N Apocynum cannabinum – Indian hemp, clasping-leaf dogbane, prairie dogbane, velvet dogbane, amyroot
  - N Apocynum sibiricum – clasping-leaved dogbane
  - N Apocynum × floribundum (A. androsaemifolium × A. cannabinum) – intermediate dogbane, bitter dogbane

== Aq ==
- Aquilegia
  - N Aquilegia brevistyla – small-flowered columbine
  - N Aquilegia canadensis – Canadian columbine, red columbine
  - X Aquilegia vulgaris – European columbine, garden columbine, culverwort, capon's feather

== Ar ==
- Arabidopsis
  - X Arabidopsis thaliana – mouse-ear cress, wall-cress
- Arabis
  - N Arabis alpina subsp. alpina – alpine rockcress
  - X Arabis alpina subsp. caucasica – wall rockcress, grey rockcress
  - N Arabis arenicola var. arenicola – arctic rockcress
  - N Arabis arenicola var. pubescens – sand rockcress
  - N Arabis canadensis – sicklepod
  - N Arabis divaricarpa – limestone rockcress
  - N Arabis drummondii – Drummond rockcress
  - N Arabis glabra – tower-mustard
  - N Arabis hirsuta var. adpressipilis – hairy rockcress, creamflower rockcress
  - N Arabis hirsuta var. pycnocarpa – creamflower rockcress
  - N Arabis holboelli var. retrofracta – Holboell's rockcress
  - N Arabis holboelli var. secunda – bristly-leaved rockcress
  - ? Arabis kamchatica – lyreleaf rockcress (species status disputed)
  - N Arabis laevigata – smooth rockcress
  - N Arabis lyrata – lyreleaf rockcress
  - N Arabis shortii – Short's rockcress
- Aralia
  - X Aralia elata – Japanese Angelica-tree, Chinese Angelica-tree
  - N Aralia hispida – bristly spikenard, bristly sarsaparilla, dwarf elder
  - N Aralia nudicaulis – wild sarsaparilla, small spikenard
  - N Aralia racemosa – American spikenard, Indian-root, life-of-man, petty morel
  - X Aralia spinosa – Hercules' club, Devil's walkingstick, prickly ash, Angelica tree, toothache tree
- Arceuthobium
  - N Arceuthobium americanum – pine mistletoe, American mistletoe, lodgepole pine dwarf mistletoe
  - N Arceuthobium pusillum – dwarf mistletoe, eastern dwarf mistletoe
- Arctagrostis
  - N Arctagrostis latifolia – polargrass
- Arctium
  - X Arctium lappa – great burdock
  - X Arctium minus subsp. minus – common burdock
  - X Arctium minus subsp. nemorosum – lesser burdock
  - X Arctium pubens – wood burdock
  - X Arctium tomentosum – woolly burdock, tomentose burdock
  - X Arctium × nothum (A. lappa × A. minus) – hybrid burdock
- Arctophila
  - N Arctophila fulva – pendant grass
- Arctostaphylos
  - N Arctostaphylos alpina – alpine bearberry
  - N Arctostaphylos rubra – red manzanita
  - N Arctostaphylos uva-ursi – bearberry, kinnikinnick, mealberry
- Arenaria
  - N Arenaria humifusa – creeping sandwort, low sandwort, spreading sandwort
  - X Arenaria serpyllifolia – thymeleaf sandwort
- Arethusa
  - N Arethusa bulbosa – dragon's mouth, swamp pink
- Argemone
  - X Argemone mexicana – Mexican prickly-poppy
- Arisaema
  - N Arisaema dracontium – green dragon Special Concern
  - N Arisaema triphyllum – Jack-in-the-pulpit
- Aristida
  - N Aristida basiramea – forktip threeawn Endangered
  - N Aristida dichotoma – Shinner's threeawn
  - N Aristida longespica var. geniculata – red threeawn
  - N Aristida longespica var. longespica – slimspike threeawn
  - X Aristida oligantha – prairie three-awn grass
  - N Aristida purpurascens – arrow feather threeawn
- Aristolochia
  - X Aristolochia clematitis – birthwort
  - X Aristolochia macrophylla – pipevine
- Armeria
  - N Armeria maritima – sea thrift, Labrador sea thrift, foxflower
- Armoracia
  - X Armoracia rusticana – horseradish, red cole
- Arnica
  - N Arnica angustifolia – narrowleaf arnica, arctic arnica, arctic leopardbane
  - N Arnica chamissonis – meadow arnica, Chamisso's arnica, leafy arnica, leafy leopardbane
  - N Arnica cordifolia – heartleaf arnica, heartleaf leopardbane
  - N Arnica lonchophylla – northern arnica, longleaf arnica, white-plumed arnica, spearleaf arnica
- Arnoglossum
  - N Arnoglossum platagineum – tuberous Indian-plantain Special Concern
- Aronia
  - N Aronia melanocarpa – black chokeberry
- Arrhenatherum
  - X Arrhenatherum elatius – tall oatgrass, French rye, tuber oatgrass, bulbous oatgrass, false oat grass
- Artemisia
  - X Artemisia abrotanum – southern wormwood, southernwood, lad's love, oldman
  - X Artemisia absinthium – common wormwood, absinthe, absinthe wormwood, European wormwood
  - X Artemisia annua – sweet sagewort, annual wormwood, sweet Annie, sweet wormwood, annual mugwort
  - X Artemisia biennis – biennial wormwood
  - N Artemisia campestris subsp. borealis – boreal wormwood, Canada wormwood
  - N Artemisia campestris subsp. caudata – tall wormwood, beach wormwood, wild wormwood, threadleaf sagewort, sagewort wormwood
  - N Artemisia dracunculus – wild tarragon, dragon wormwood, dragon sagewort, false tarragon, French tarragon, Russian tarragon
  - N Artemisia frigida – fringed sagebrush, prairie sagebrush, fringed sagewort, prairie sagewort, wormwood sage, pasture sage, arctic sagebrush
  - N Artemisia ludoviciana – white sage, silver wormwood, prairie sage, western mugwort, darkleaf mugwort, cudweed sagewort, pasture sage, Louisiana wormwood, Louisiana sage, silver king artemisia, white wormwood, white sagebrush
  - X Artemisia pontica – Roman wormwood, petite wormwood, green ginger
  - X Artemisia stelleriana – hoary sagebrush, dusty miller, beach wormwood, old woman
  - N Artemisia tilesii – Tilesius' wormwood, mountain sagewort, oldwoman
  - X Artemisia vulgaris – common mugwort, common wormwood
- Aruncus
  - X Aruncus dioicus – common goat's-beard

== As ==
- Asarum
  - N Asarum canadense – Canada wild ginger
- Asclepias
  - N Asclepias exaltata – poke milkweed, tall milkweed, four-leaved milkweed
  - N Asclepias hirtella – tall green milkweed
  - N Asclepias incarnata – swamp milkweed
  - N Asclepias ovalifolia – oval-leaf milkweed, dwarf milkweed
  - N Asclepias purpurascens – purple milkweed
  - N Asclepias quadrifolia – four-leaved milkweed
  - N Asclepias sullivantii – Sullivant's milkweed
  - N Asclepias syriaca – common milkweed, silkweed, silky swallow-wort
  - N Asclepias tuberosa – butterfly weed, orange milkweed, pleurisy root, chigger flower
  - ? Asclepias variegata – white milkweed
  - N Asclepias verticillata – whorled milkweed
  - N Asclepias viridiflora – green milkweed, green comet milkweed, short green milkweed
- Asimina
  - N Asimina triloba – common pawpaw
- Asparagus
  - X Asparagus officinalis – garden asparagus, asparagus-fern
- Asperugo
  - X Asperugo procumbens – German madwort, catchweed
- Asperula
  - X Asperula arvensis – blue woodruff
- Asplenium
  - N Asplenium platyneuron – ebony spleenwort
  - N Asplenium rhizophyllum – walking fern
  - N Asplenium ruta-muraria – wall-rue
  - N Asplenium scolopendrium var. americanum – American Hart's-tongue fern Special Concern
  - N Asplenium trichomanes – maidenhair spleenwort
  - N Asplenium viride – green spleenwort
- Aster
  - N Aster alpinus – alpine aster
- Astragalus
  - N Astragalus adsurgens – ascending milkvetch, rattle milkvetch, standing milkvetch
  - N Astragalus agrestis – field milkvetch, mile-vetch, cock's-head
  - N Astragalus alpinus – alpine milkvetch
  - N Astragalus americanus – American milkvetch
  - N Astragalus australis – Indian milkvetch
  - N Astragalus canadensis – Canada milkvetch, Carolina milkvetch
  - X Astragalus cicer – chickpea milkvetch
  - N Astragalus eucosmus – elegant milkvetch, pretty milkvetch
  - X Astragalus glycophyllos – wild liquorice
  - N Astragalus neglectus – Cooper's milkvetch
  - N Astragalus tenellus – pulse milkvetch, loose-flower milkvetch

== At ==
- Athyrium
  - N Athyrium filix-femina var. angustum – northern lady fern
  - N Athyrium filix-femina var. cyclosorum – northwestern lady fern
- Atriplex
  - N Atriplex dioica – thickleaf orache, saline saltbush
  - N Atriplex glabriuscula – smooth orache, Scotland orache, glabrous orache, northeastern saltbush
  - X Atriplex heterosperma – two-scale orache
  - X Atriplex hortensis – garden orache
  - X Atriplex oblongifolia – oblong-leaf orache
  - N Atriplex patula – spear orache, spreading orache, spearscale, halberdleaf orache, common orache
  - N Atriplex prostrata – thinleaf orache, triangle orache, fat-hen
  - X Atriplex rosea – tumbling orache

== Au ==
- Aureolaria
  - N Aureolaria flava – yellow false-foxglove
  - N Aureolaria pedicularia – fernleaf yellow false-foxglove
  - N Aureolaria virginica – downy false-foxglove
- Aurinia
  - X Aurinia saxatilis – basket-of-gold, gold dust, gold alyssum

== Av ==
- Avena
  - X Avena fatua – wild oats
  - X Avena sativa – oats, cultivated oats
  - X Avena sterilis – animated oats

== Ax ==
- Axyris
  - X Axyris amaranthoides – Russian pigweed, upright axyris

== Az ==
- Azolla
  - N Azolla caroliniana – mosquito fern
