= Common agrimony =

Common agrimony is a common name for several plants and may refer to:

- Agrimonia eupatoria, native to Europe and introduced to North America
- Agrimonia gryposepala, native to North America
