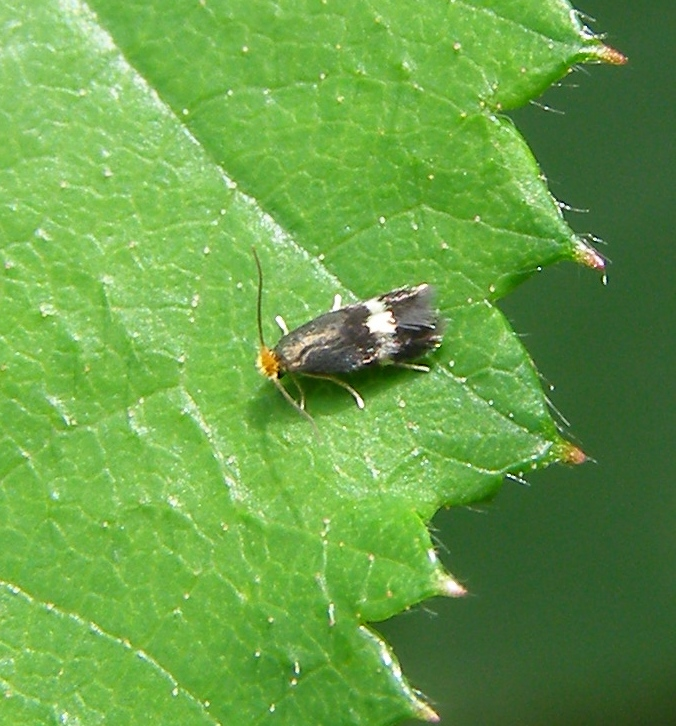

Scientific classification
- Kingdom: Animalia
- Phylum: Arthropoda
- Clade: Pancrustacea
- Class: Insecta
- Order: Lepidoptera
- Family: Nepticulidae
- Genus: Stigmella
- Species: S. aurella

Binomial name
- Stigmella aurella (Fabricius, 1775)

Synonyms
- List: Tinea aurella Fabricius, 1775; Nepticula albicomella Heinemann & Wocke, 1876; Nepticula fragariella Heinemann, 1862; Nepticula gei Wocke, 1871; Nepticula nitens Fologne, 1862; Stigmella fragariella (Heinemann, 1862) Vári, 1944; Nepticula gei var. geirubi Skala, 1940; Nepticula fruticosella Müller-Rutz, 1914; Nepticula gei f. semicolorella Eppelsheim, 1891

= Stigmella aurella =

Species of moth

Stigmella aurella is a moth of the family Nepticulidae found in Africa, Asia and Europe. It was first described by the Danish zoologist, Johan Christian Fabricius in 1775. The larvae are leaf miners.

== Description ==
The wingspan is 6–7 millimetres (0.24–0.28 in). The head is ferruginous to orange. Antennal eyecaps ochreous-whitish. Forewings shining copper gold; a shining pale golden fascia beyond middle, preceded by a purplish or dark purple-fuscous fascia, apical area beyond this dark purple to fuscous. Hindwings rather dark grey. Adults are on wing in May and later in the summer.

Ovum

Eggs are laid on either side of a leaf.

Larva

Larvae are amber yellow with a greenish-brown gut and a yellow-brown head. The mine is a long sinuous gallery which gradually widens and the frass is dispersed. Larvae feed on common agrimony (Agrimonia eupatoria), Agrimonia procera, bastard-agrimony (Aremonia agrimonoides), musk strawberry (Fragaria moschata), wild strawberry (Fragaria vesca), creamy strawberry (Fragaria viridis), water avens (Geum rivale), wood avens (Geum urbanum), European dewberry (Rubus caesius), Rubus dumetorum, European blackberry (Rubus fruticosus), raspberry (Rubus idaeus), blackberry (Rubus plicatus), holy bramble (Rubus sanguineus), stone bramble (Rubus saxatilis) and elmleaf blackberry (Rubus ulmifolius).

Pupa

The larva pupates in a cocoon which is spun in detritus. It varies in colour from pale green to pale ochreous.

== Gallery ==
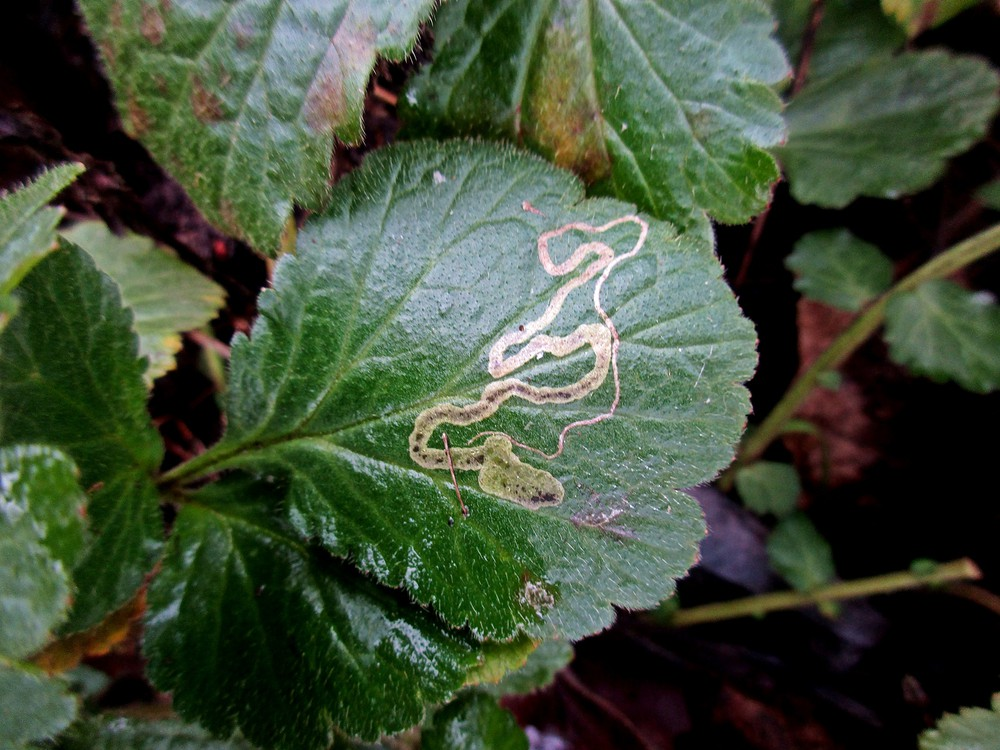
Mine on Geum species

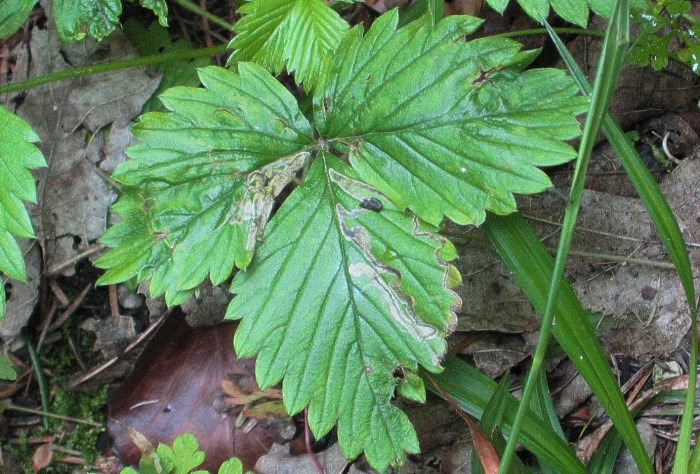
Mine on Fragaria species

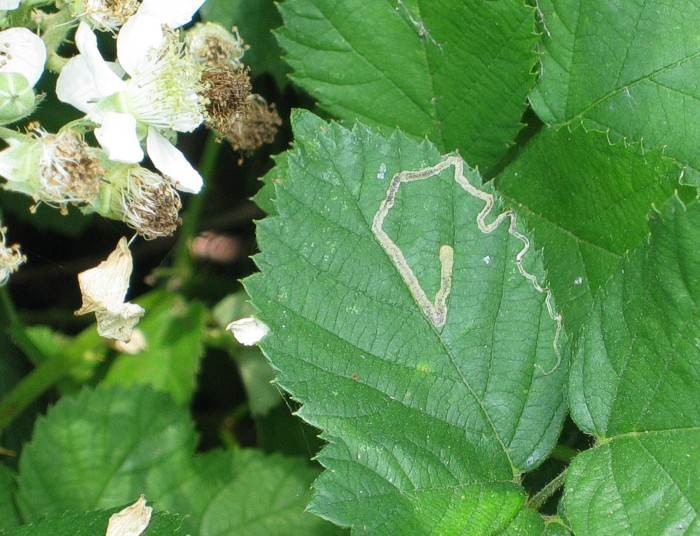
mine on bramble

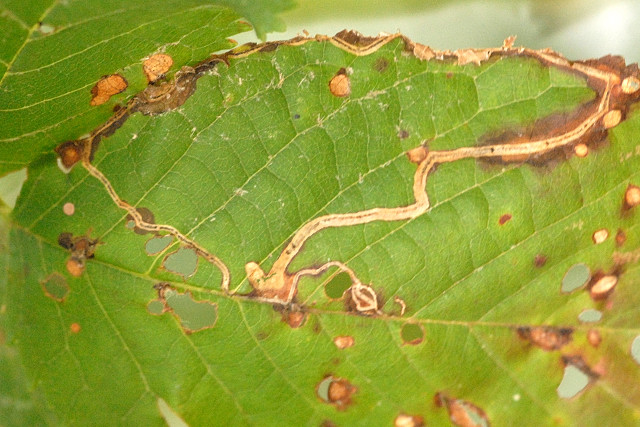
Mine, on bramble, showing the frass,

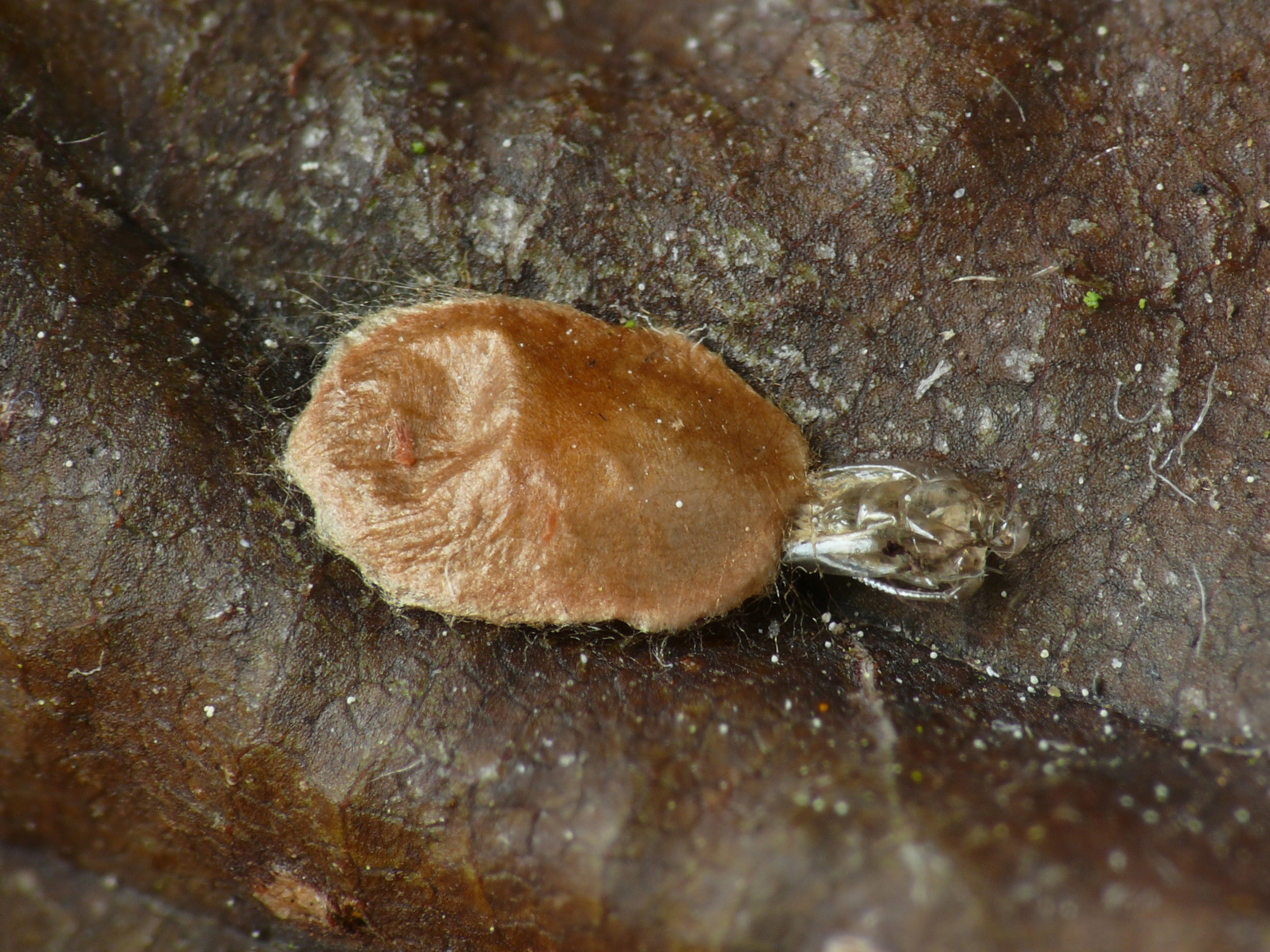
Vacated cocoon showing the exuvia

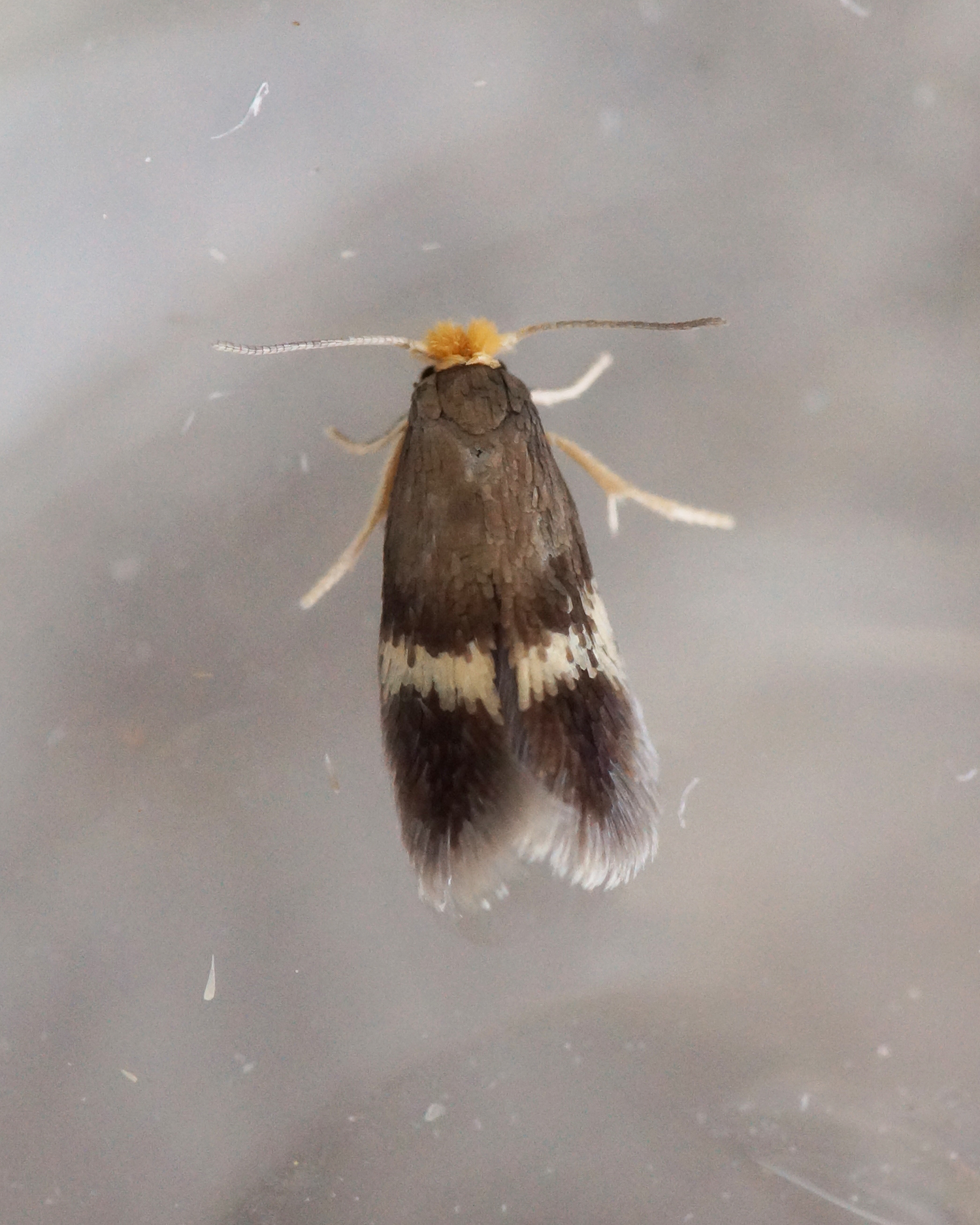

== Distribution ==
It is found in Europe from Ireland to Ukraine, the Near East, and the eastern part of the Palearctic realm.

== Taxonomy ==
The genus Stigmella was erected by the German priest, botanist and entomologist, Franz von Paula Schrank in 1802. Stigma refers to the small spot or a brand, possibly from the small size of the moths, or more likely from the conspicuous (sometimes metallic) fascia on the forewing of many of the species in the genus. The word stigma in English can sometimes signify a mark of disgrace, although not in this case, as Schrank called the moths Edelmotte, i.e. noble moths. Initially, Stigmella had family rather than generic status. The specific name aurella, comes from aurum referring to gold; from the golden, metallic fascia on the forewing.
