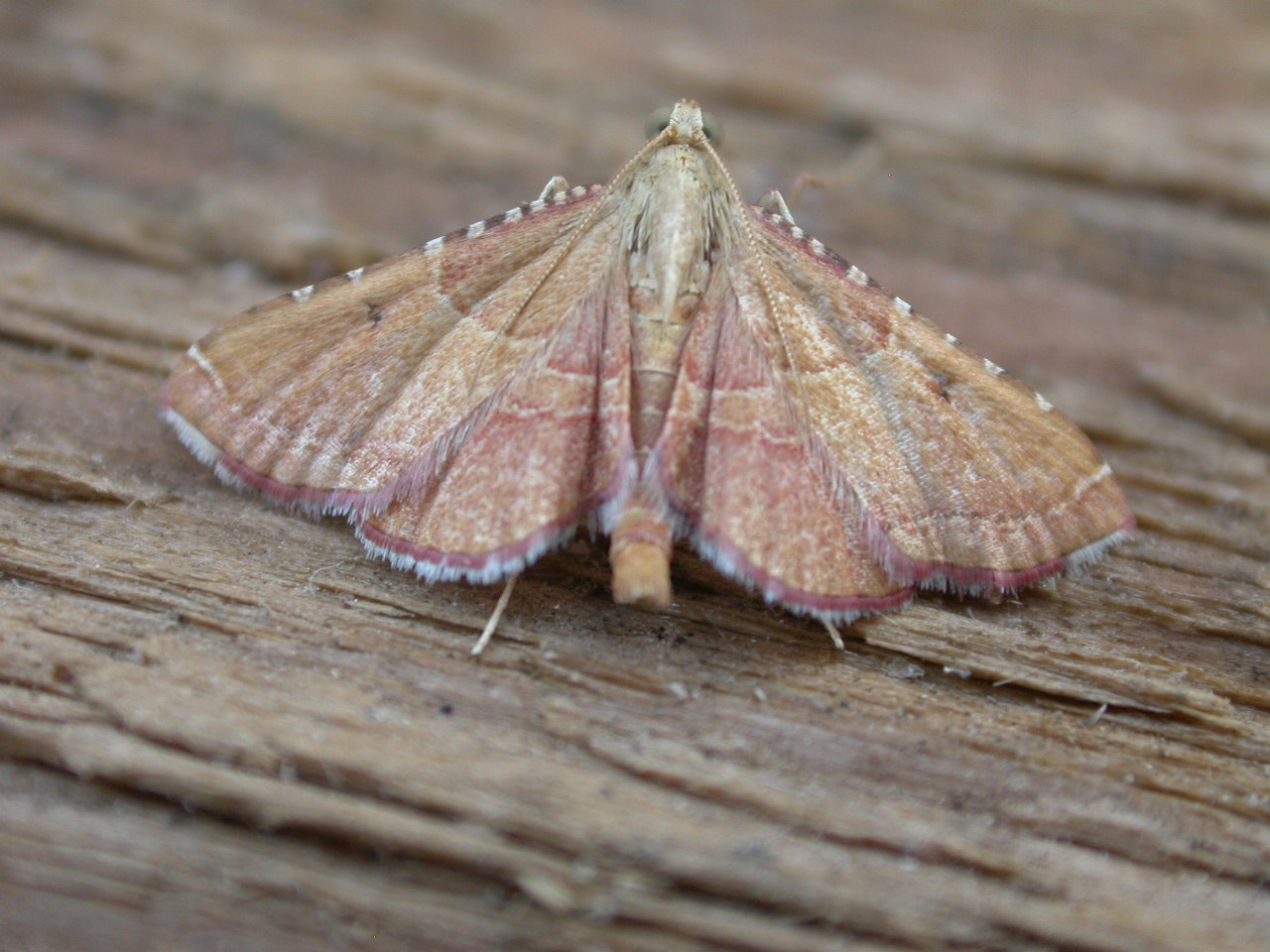
- Upperside
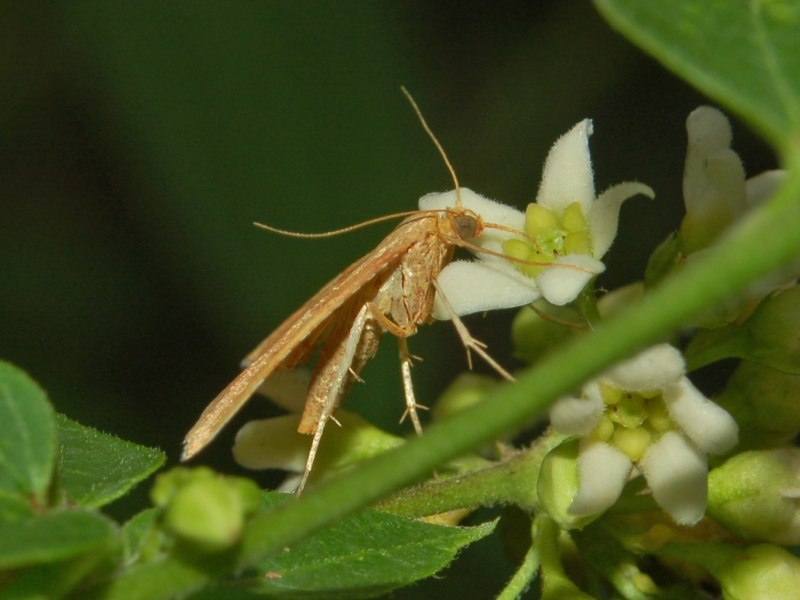
- Lateral view

Scientific classification
- Kingdom: Animalia
- Phylum: Arthropoda
- Clade: Pancrustacea
- Class: Insecta
- Order: Lepidoptera
- Family: Pyralidae
- Genus: Endotricha
- Species: E. flammealis

Binomial name
- Endotricha flammealis (Denis & Schiffermüller, 1775)

Synonyms
- Endotricha flammealis carnealis de Lattin, 1951; Pyralis flammealis Denis & Schiffermüller, 1775; Endotricha flammealis var. adustalis Turati, 1905; Endotricha flammealis var. lutealis Turati, 1905; Endotricha flammealis var. montanalis Krulikovsky, 1907

= Endotricha flammealis =

Species of moth

Endotricha flammealis, the rose-flounced tabby, is a species of snout moth, family Pyralidae.

== Taxonomy ==
The proposed subspecies carnealis and several supposed varieties seem to be indistinguishable from typical individuals found in Austria.

== Distribution ==
This species can be found in western, central and southern Europe and nearby regions. Its range extends to Turkey, Crimea, Cyprus, Iran (via the Caucasus), to Lebanon and Syria, and to Algeria and Tunisia.

== Habitat ==
These moths inhabit grassland, heathland, woodland, fens, scrub and gardens.

== Description ==
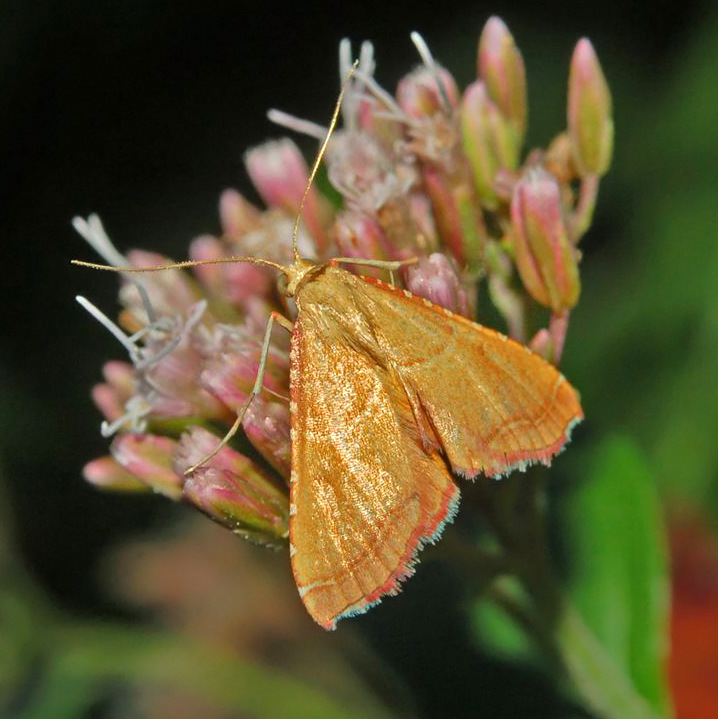

Endotricha flammealis has a wingspan of 18–23 mm. The forewings are oblong, rather pointed at the tip. The antennae of males are pubescent. The basic colour of the wings is extremely variable. It is usually ochre in colour, brown or pale brown, but it may also be pinkish brown. On the edge of the forewings there are characteristic darker brown markings and bright or pinkish lines. The front edge of the forewings shows also a series of small white spots. Sometimes the moths may be light coloured without almost no markings. These moths have usually a distinctive resting posture, with the head and the front part of the body raised on its forelegs and with bottom of wings touching the surface. The caterpillars are brownish.

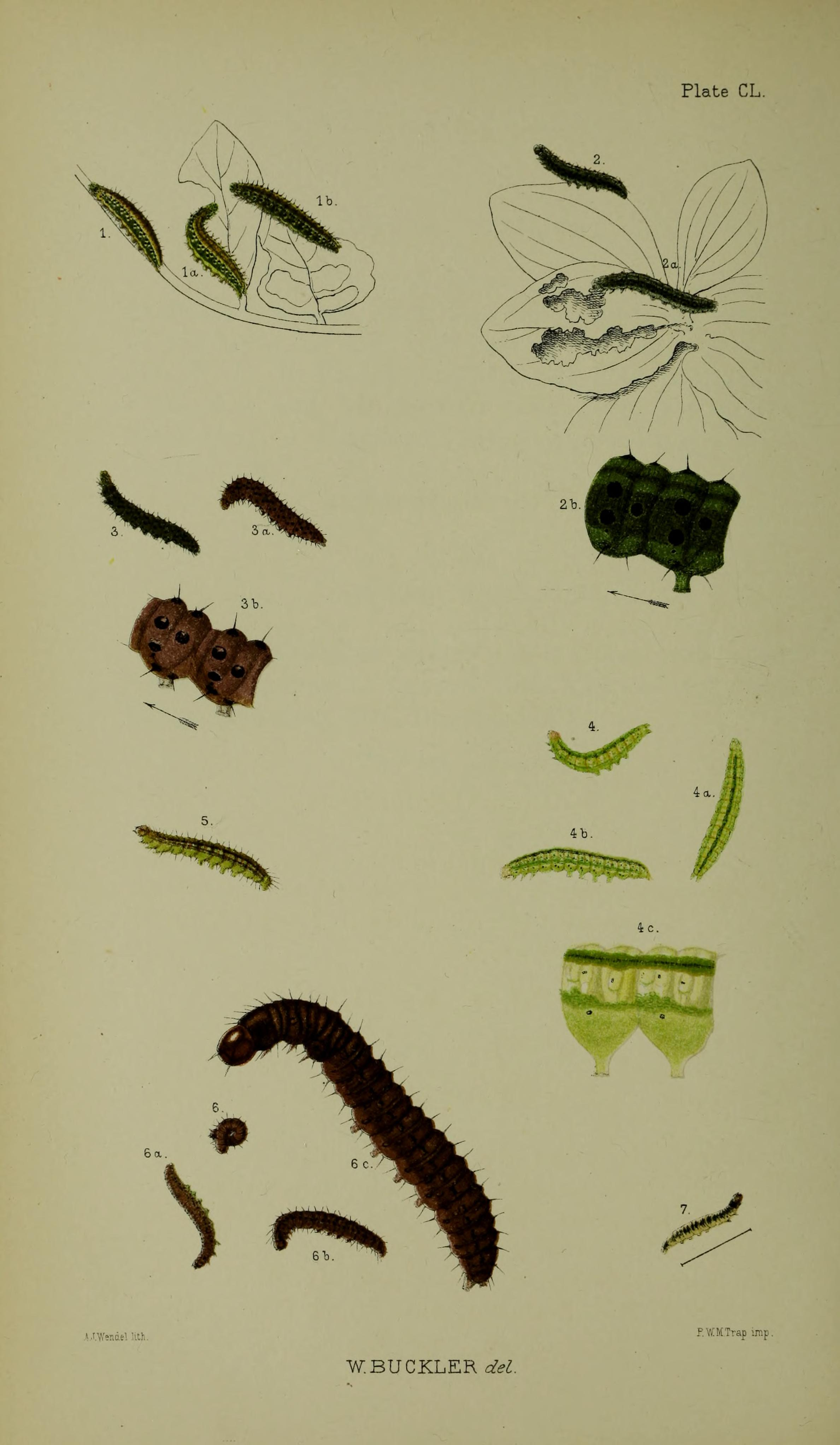
Figs 6, 6a, 6b larvae in various stages of growth 6c larva highly magnified

== Biology ==
The moths fly from July to August in the temperate parts of its range (e.g. in the British Isles) and are attracted to light. They mainly feed on nectar of Calluna vulgaris, Tanacetum vulgare, Chamerion angustifolium, Buddleja davidii, Heracleum sphondylium and Jacobaea vulgaris.

The females lay their eggs in summer on the underside of leaves. The caterpillars typically feed on common agrimony (Agrimonia eupatoria) and bilberries (Vaccinium), as well as on various plant remains and on dry leaves of willows (Salix) and oaks (Quercus).
