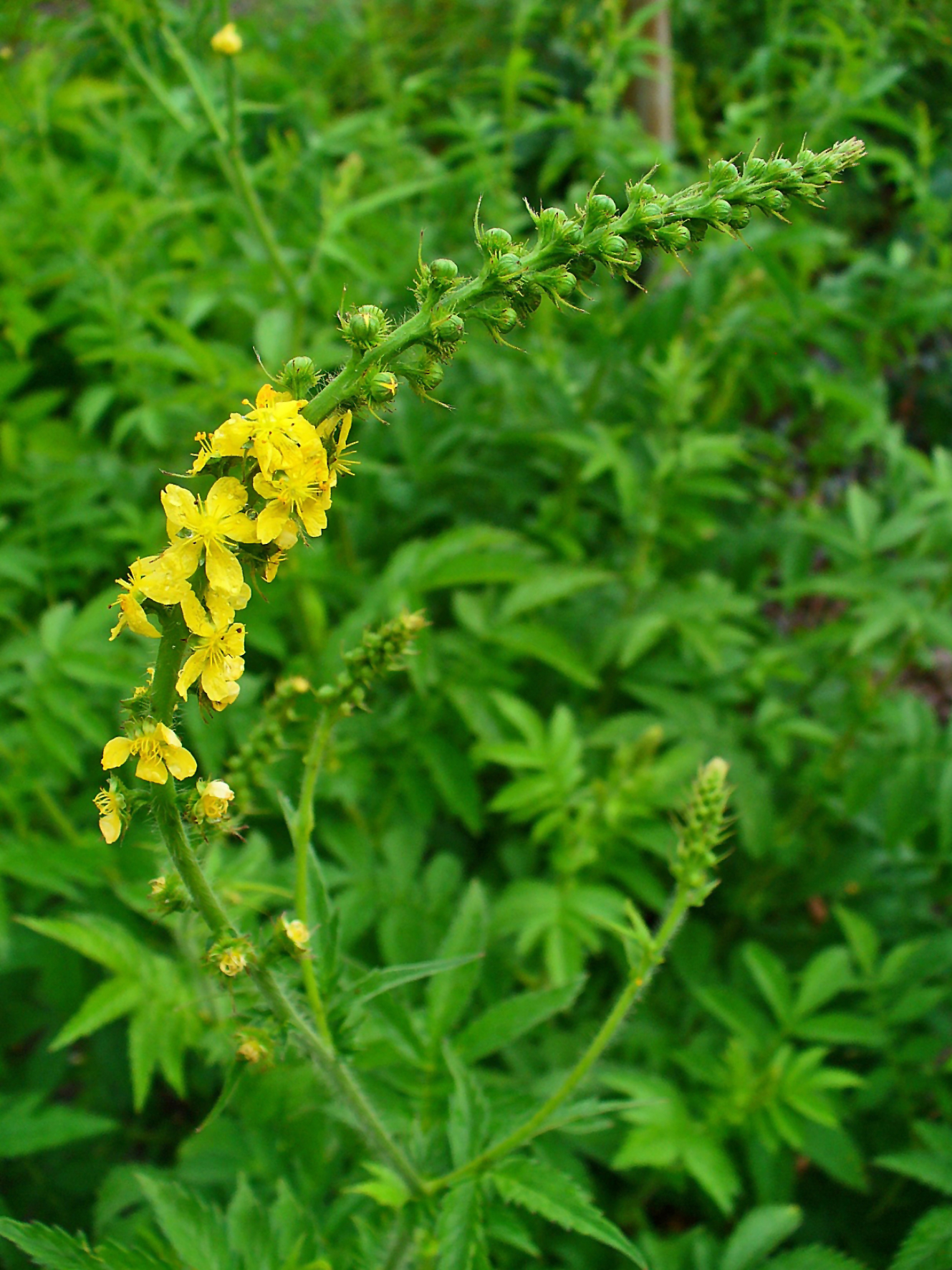

Scientific classification
- Kingdom: Plantae
- Clade: Tracheophytes
- Clade: Angiosperms
- Clade: Eudicots
- Clade: Rosids
- Order: Rosales
- Family: Rosaceae
- Genus: Agrimonia
- Species: A. procera

Binomial name
- Agrimonia procera Wallr.

= Agrimonia procera =

Species of flowering plant

Agrimonia procera, the fragrant agrimony, is a species of flowering plant belonging to the family Rosaceae.

It is native to Europe and Southern Africa.

== Description ==
A herbaceous perennial plant which grows to about 1 m tall, with a branched or unbranched green stem covered in glandular hairs which are 2 mm long or slightly longer. The leaves are pinnate with 3-6 pairs of oval, distinctly serrated primary leaflets, an irregular number of secondary leaflets, and a similar or slightly larger terminal leaflet. The underside of the leaves are studded with yellow, shiny glands which produce a sweet aroma. Flowers are arranged in long racemes at the top of the stem(s). Each flower has 5 yellow petals, 5-20 stamens and 2 carpels. The hypanthium develops into a characteristic brown, oval or bell-shaped fruit with deep lateral grooves and a double ring of hooked bristles around its centre, which contains 1 or 2 achenes.

It is easy to confuse fragrant agrimony with common agrimony, which has a similar distribution and habitat. The key differences are that fragrant agrimony has longer hairs (and no short hairs) on the stem, leaves that are more deeply and acutely serrated and with more glands on the underside, and fruits with shorter grooves and reflexed bristles. These hooked bristles are the most useful feature to use when it is not possible to compare the two species side-by-side: if you imagine they emerge from the fruit's "equator", then most of the bristles point "southwards" or at most straight out in common agrimony, but in fragrant agrimony some distinctly point "northwards" (towards the stalk).

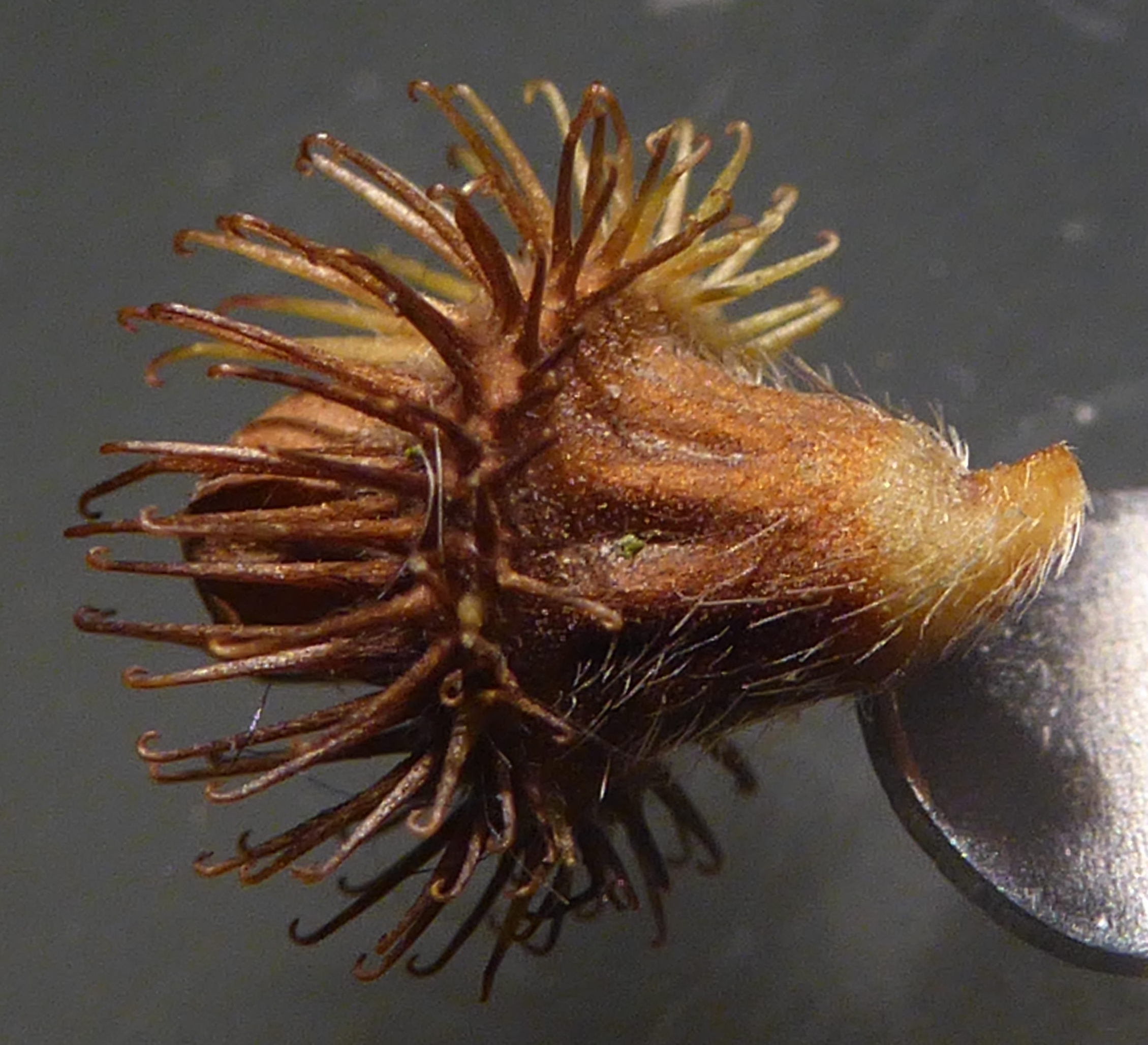
A mature fruit of fragrant agrimony

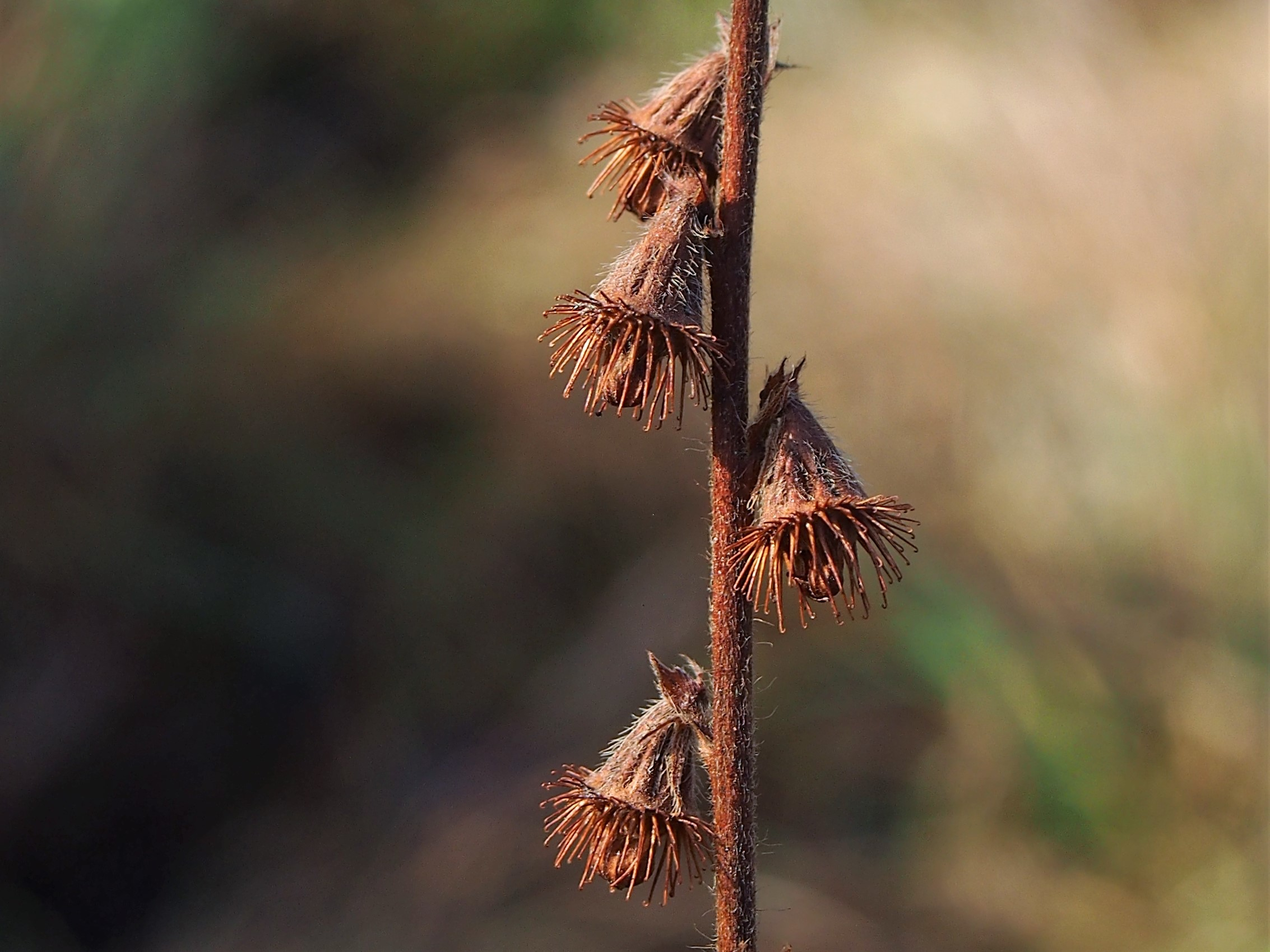
Fruits of common agrimony, for comparison

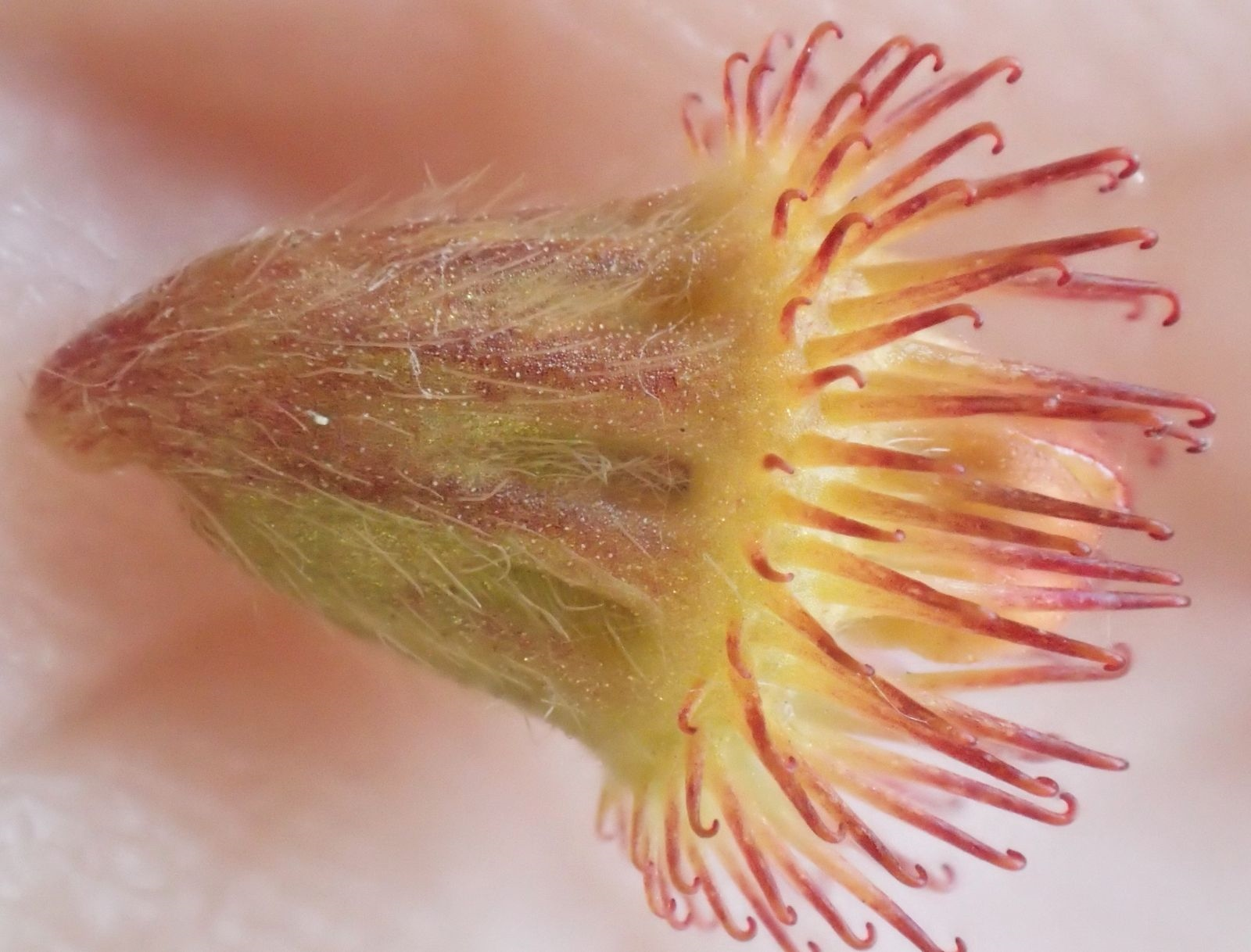
Young fruit of fragrant agrimony

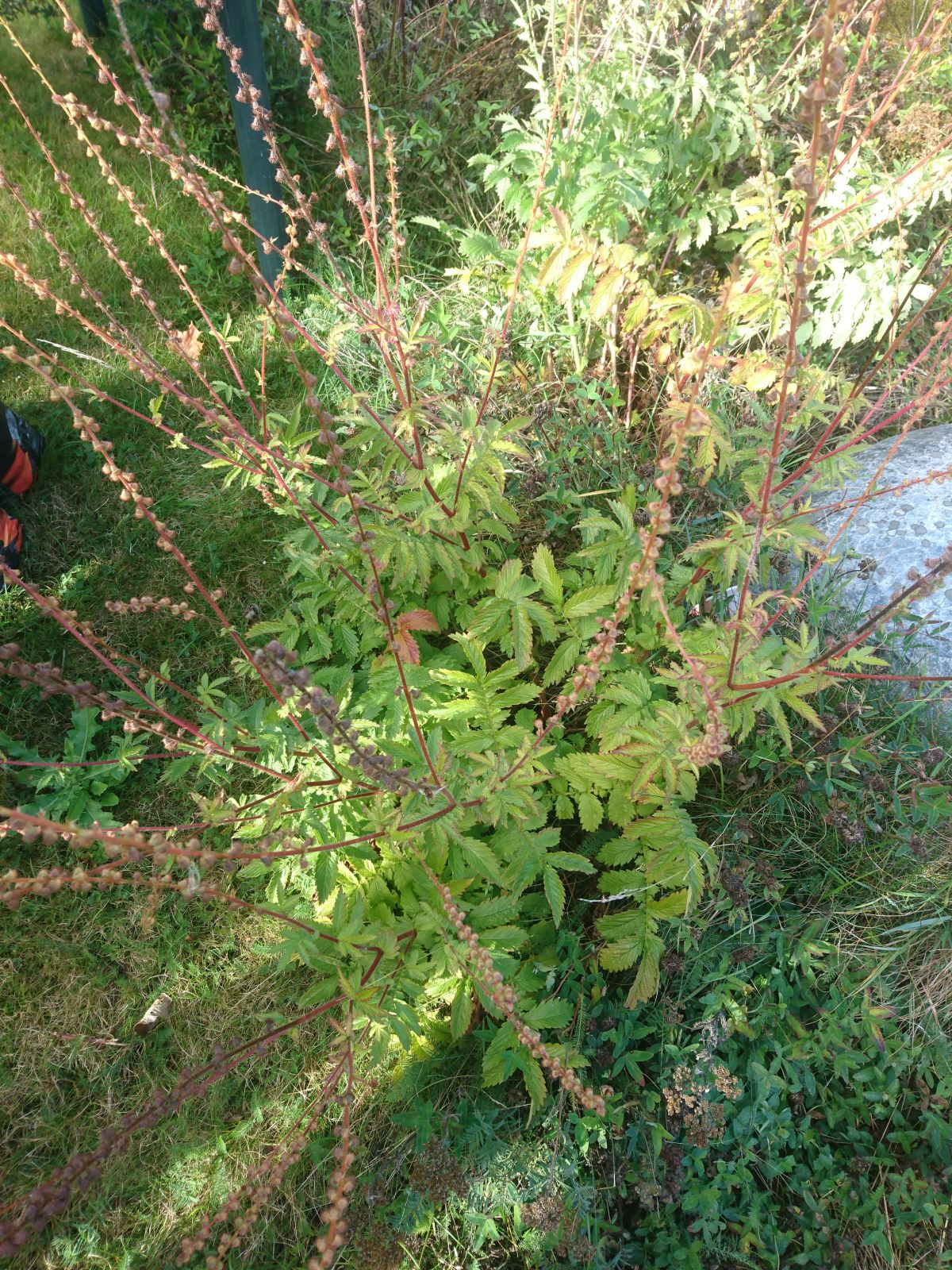
Plant with fruit

== Ecology ==
The habitat of fragrant agrimony in Britain and Ireland is woodland margin, scrub, road verges and tall grassland, on circumneutral (neither acid nor alkaline), sometimes damp, soils. It is confined to the lowlands, being known only up to 335 m at Fortingall, in Perthshire. It is a bigger, bushier and more leafy plant than common agrimony and is far less common, although its overall range is similar. It is most abundant along rides in oak or sometimes ash woods, or in field edges nearby. It flowers rather later than common agrimony, typically from late July in southern England.

Little is known about the interactions between fragrant agrimony and other species. The British database of insects and their food plants lists only one aphid, Acyrthosiphon malvae (Mosley, 1841) that has been observed on this plant. The hooked seeds are ideal for facilitating dispersal by animals, but which are primarily involved is not known.

== Distribution ==
The native distribution of fragrant agrimony is thought to include almost all of Europe and South Africa, but none of the territory between. This strikingly disjunct distribution is highly unusual and could be due to transportation of the seeds by migrating wild birds or a more recent introduction by humans. In South Africa, however, it is considered native and is officially categorised as "least concern", although some sources, such as the citizen science website iNaturalist, describe it as invasive there.

== Uses ==
Fragrant agrimony is palatable to livestock and occurs in grazed woodland, meadows and pastures. Like other species of agrimony, it is reported to have beneficial effects on the health of experimental animals and to reduce inflammation in cells in vitro. Chemicals under investigation include the bitter-tasting compound agrimoniin and various flavonoids. Agrimony is often touted as having health benefits in humans, although medical sources stress that evidence about efficacy and safety is generally lacking. Claims about its use in the past may be exaggerated: the Roman author Celsus, who was influential in medicine for over a thousand years, only mentions agrimony as a possible cure for snake bites.

With its bitter taste, agrimony is popular in herbal teas. Most advertisements for herbal teas specify common rather than fragrant agrimony, but it is not always clear that people have differentiated between the two.
