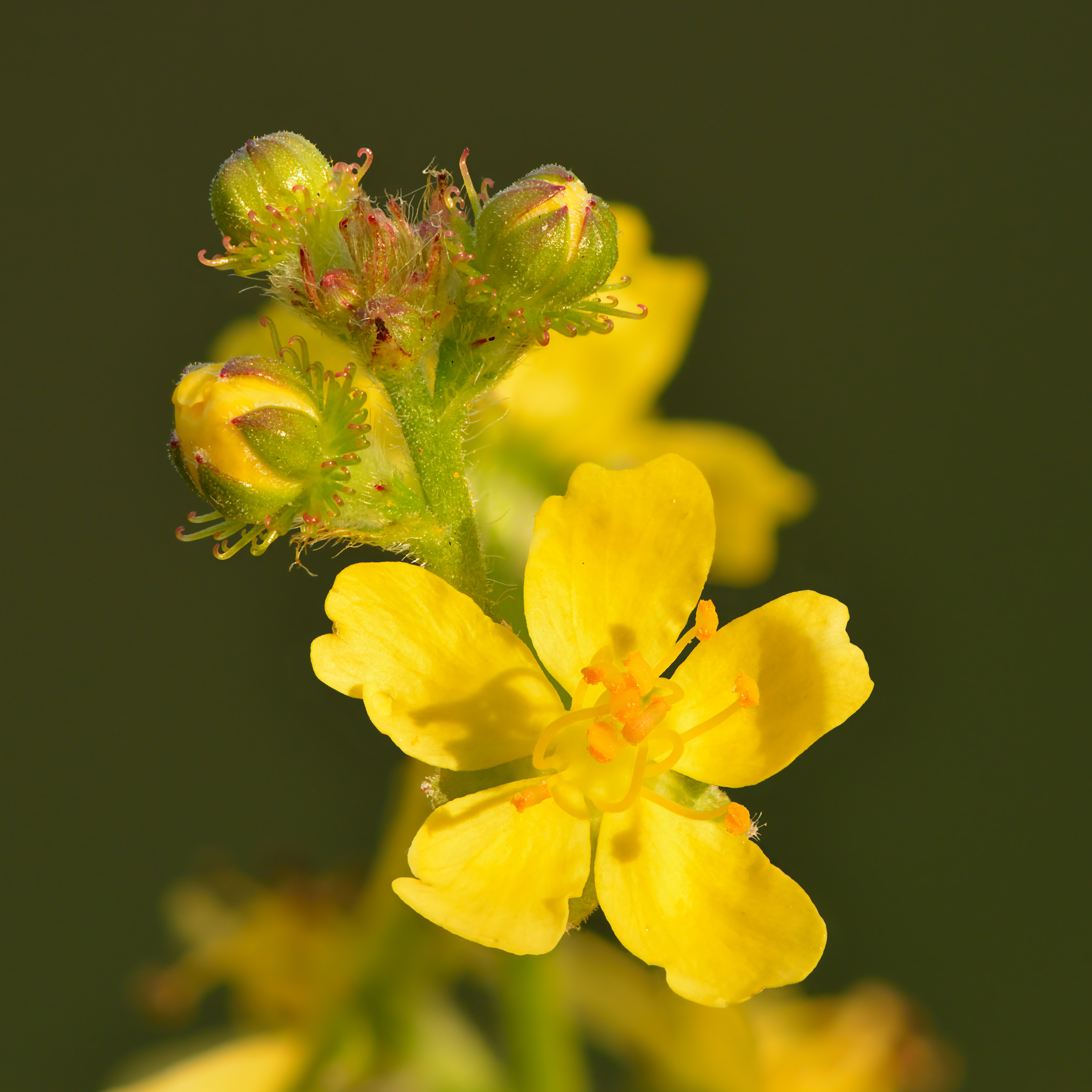
- Agrimonia eupatoria

Scientific classification
- Kingdom: Plantae
- Clade: Embryophytes
- Clade: Tracheophytes
- Clade: Angiosperms
- Clade: Eudicots
- Clade: Rosids
- Order: Rosales
- Family: Rosaceae
- Subfamily: Rosoideae
- Tribe: Sanguisorbeae
- Subtribe: Agrimoniinae
- Genus: Agrimonia; Tourn. ex L.

Species
- About 15 species; see text

= Agrimonia =

Genus of flowering plants in the rose family

Agrimonia (from the Greek ἀργεμώνη), commonly known as agrimony (UK: /ˈæɡ.rɪ.mən.i/, US: /ˈæɡ.rɪˌmoʊ.ni/), is a genus of 12–15 species of perennial herbaceous flowering plants in the family Rosaceae, native to the temperate regions of the Northern Hemisphere, with one species also in Africa. The species grow to between 0.5–2 m (1.6–6.6 ft) tall, with interrupted pinnate leaves, and tiny yellow flowers borne on a single (usually unbranched) spike.

Agrimonia species are used as food plants by the larva of some Lepidoptera species including grizzled skipper (recorded on A. eupatoria) and large grizzled skipper.

== Species ==
- Agrimonia eupatoria – Common agrimony (Europe, Asia, Africa)
- Agrimonia gryposepala – Common agrimony, tall hairy agrimony (North America)
- Agrimonia incisa – Incised agrimony (North America)
- Agrimonia coreana – Korean agrimony (eastern Asia)
- Agrimonia microcarpa – Smallfruit agrimony (North America)
- Agrimonia nipponica – Japanese agrimony (eastern Asia)
- Agrimonia parviflora – Harvestlice agrimony (North America)
- Agrimonia pilosa – Hairy agrimony (eastern Europe, Asia)
- Agrimonia procera – Fragrant agrimony (Europe)
- Agrimonia pubescens – Soft or downy agrimony (North America)
- Agrimonia repens – Short agrimony (southwest Asia)
- Agrimonia rostellata – Beaked agrimony (North America)
- Agrimonia striata – Roadside agrimony (North America)

== Uses ==
In ancient times, it was used for foot baths and tired feet. Agrimony has a long history of medicinal use. The English poet Michael Drayton once hailed it as an "all-heal" and through the ages it was considered a panacea. The ancient Greeks used agrimony to treat eye ailments, and it was made into brews for diarrhea and disorders of the gallbladder, liver, and kidneys. The Anglo-Saxons boiled agrimony in milk and used it to improve erectile performance. They also made a solution from the leaves and seeds for healing wounds; this use continued through the Middle Ages and afterward, in a preparation called eau d'arquebusade, or "musket-shot water". It has been added to tea as a spring tonic. According to the German Federal Commission E (Phytotherapy)-Monograph "Agrimony", published 1990, the internal application area is "mild, nonspecific, acute diarrhea" and "inflammation of oral and pharyngeal mucosa" and the external application "mild, superficial inflammation of the skin".

== Folklore ==
Traditional British folklore states that if a sprig of Agrimonia eupatoria was placed under a person's head, they would sleep until it was removed.

== See also ==
- Aremonia agrimonoides (Bastard-agrimony, of the related genus Aremonia)
- Eupatorium cannabinum (Hemp-agrimony)
