= Agrimonia incisa =

Conservation status
- Vulnerable (NatureServe)

Scientific classification
- Kingdom: Plantae
- Clade: Tracheophytes
- Clade: Angiosperms
- Clade: Eudicots
- Clade: Rosids
- Order: Rosales
- Family: Rosaceae
- Genus: Agrimonia
- Species: A. incisa

Binomial name
- Agrimonia incisa Torr. & A.Gray

Species of flowering plant

Agrimonia incisa, commonly known as pineland agrimony or incised groovebur, is a species of flowering plant in the rose family, Rosaceae. It is a perennial herb endemic to the Coastal Plain of the southeastern United States. It occurs primarily in open, fire-maintained longleaf pine woodlands and associated disturbed pineland habitats from eastern South Carolina south to central peninsular Florida and west to eastern Texas.

NatureServe assigns Agrimonia incisa a global conservation rank of G3G4, indicating uncertainty between vulnerable and apparently secure. Its rounded global rank is G3, or vulnerable.
