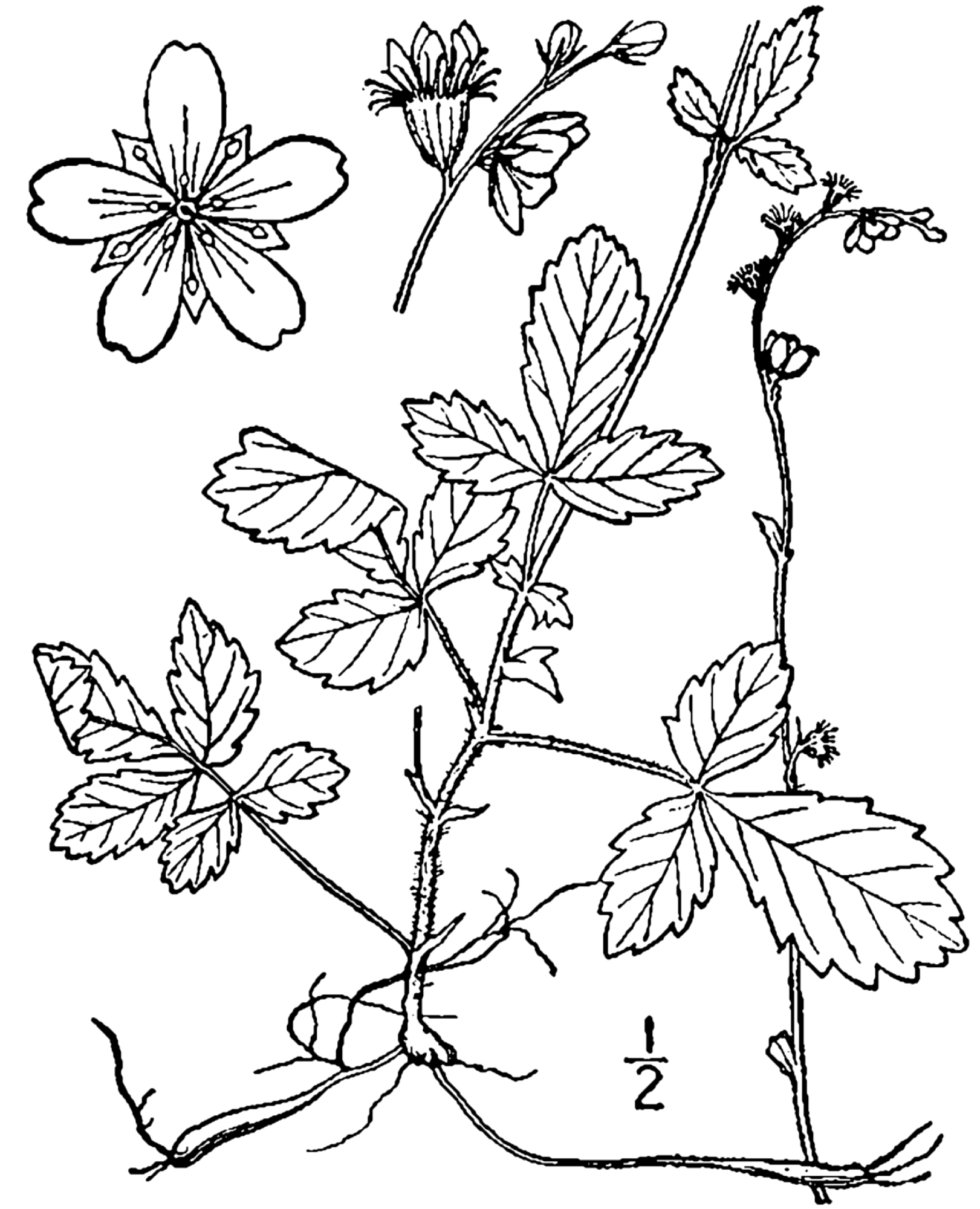

Scientific classification
- Kingdom: Plantae
- Clade: Embryophytes
- Clade: Tracheophytes
- Clade: Angiosperms
- Clade: Eudicots
- Clade: Rosids
- Order: Rosales
- Family: Rosaceae
- Genus: Agrimonia
- Species: A. microcarpa

Binomial name
- Agrimonia microcarpa Wallr.

= Agrimonia microcarpa =

Species of flowering plant

Agrimonia microcarpa, also known as smallfruit agrimony or low agrimony, is a member of the rose family found throughout the coastal areas of the southeastern United States. It commonly occurs in mesic environments, in habitat types including deciduous and mixed woods.
