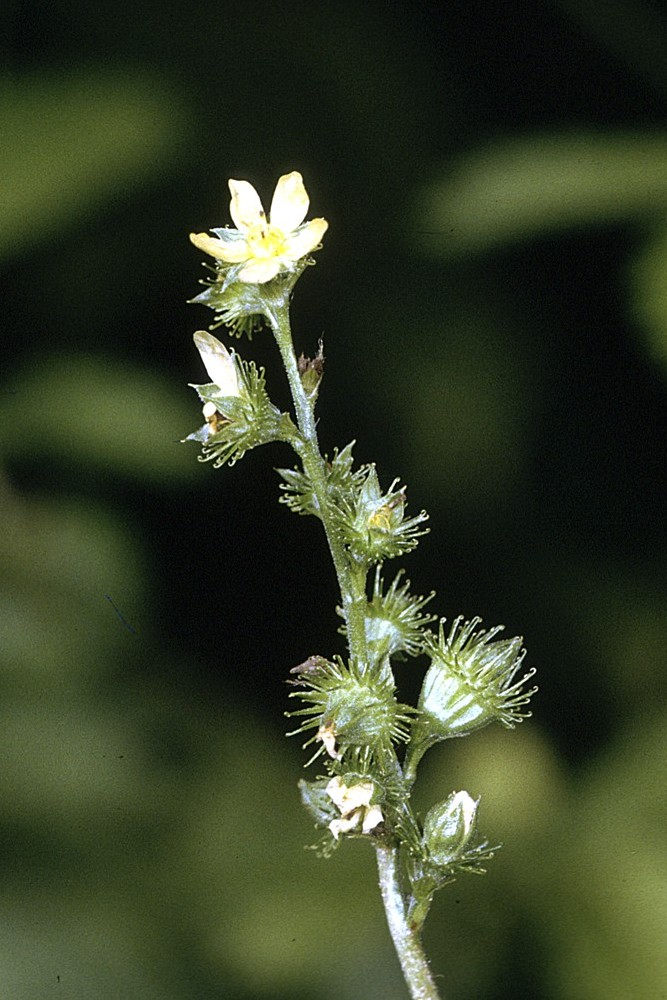
- A. gryposepala flowers

Conservation status
- Secure (NatureServe)

Scientific classification
- Kingdom: Plantae
- Clade: Tracheophytes
- Clade: Angiosperms
- Clade: Eudicots
- Clade: Rosids
- Order: Rosales
- Family: Rosaceae
- Genus: Agrimonia
- Species: A. gryposepala

Binomial name
- Agrimonia gryposepala Wallr.

= Agrimonia gryposepala =

Tall hairy agrimony

Species of flowering plant

Agrimonia gryposepala (commonly known as tall hairy agrimony, common agrimony, hooked agrimony, or tall hairy grooveburr) is a small perennial flowering plant of the rose family (Rosaceae), which is native to North America. This plant is used by various indigenous peoples to treat medical problems such as diarrhea and fever.

== Description ==
The plant grows 1–5 ft (about 30–150 cm) high, producing a cluster of small, yellow, 5-parted flowers on a hairy stalk above pinnate leaves. The fruits are hooked dry seeds grouped in a cluster. A spicy scent is released when the stem is crushed. The plant's native range covers most of the United States and Canada (except the Rocky Mountains) and extending south to Chiapas, Mexico. It grows in woodlands and forests.

== Conservation status in the United States ==
It is listed as threatened in Kentucky.

== Uses ==
Across North America, various indigenous peoples used the plant for medicinal purposes. Among the Haudenosaunee people, a drink made from the roots of the plant was used for diarrhea. Among the Cherokee, the plant was used for the same purpose, to reduce fever, and for a range of other problems. The Ojibwe used the plant for urinary problems, and the Meskwaki and Prairie Potawatomi used it as a styptic for nosebleeds.

These ethnobotanical uses of the plant have some similarities to the traditional medical uses of Agrimonia eupatoria, which is native to Europe, Asia, and Africa.
