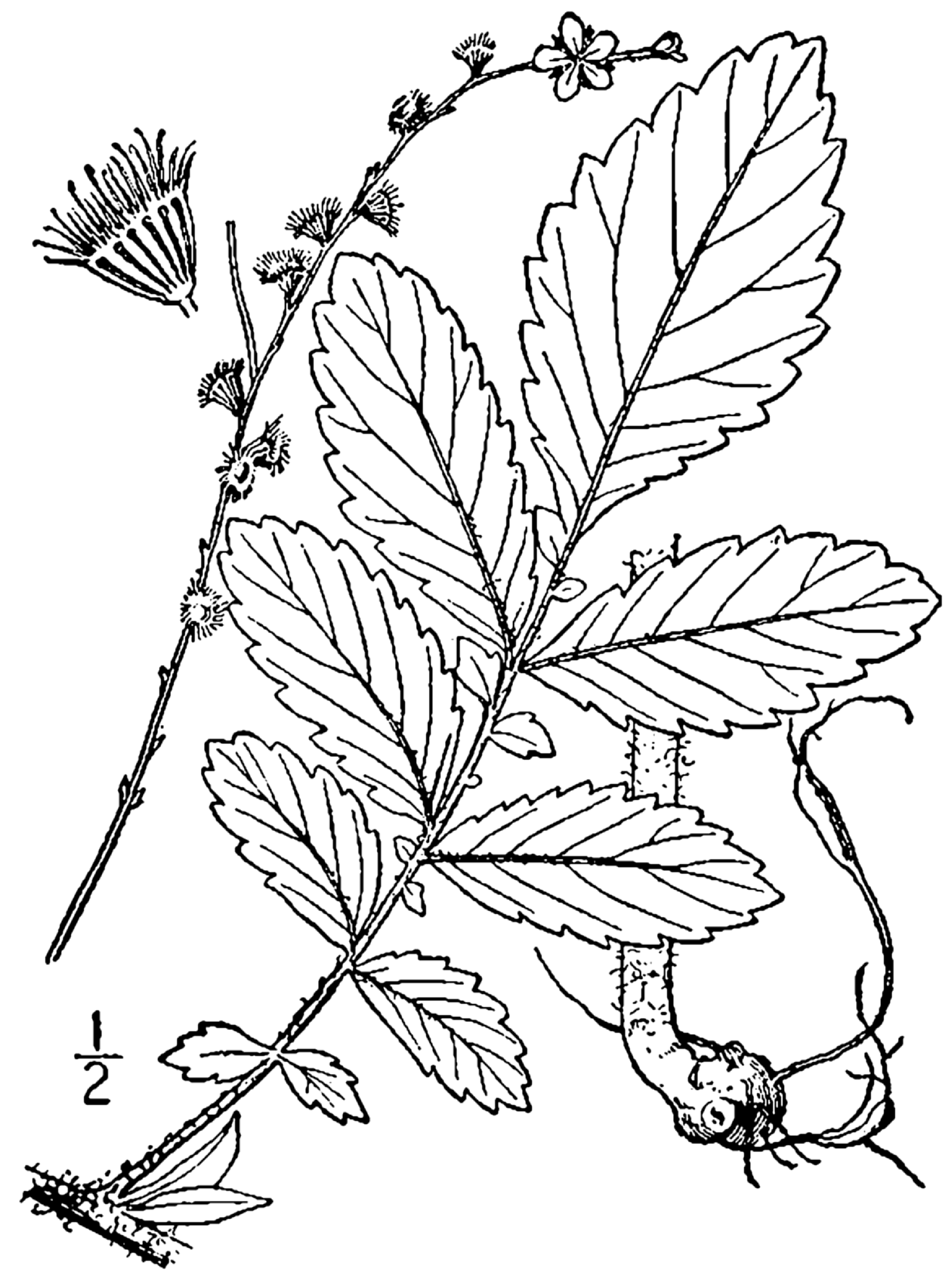

Scientific classification
- Kingdom: Plantae
- Clade: Tracheophytes
- Clade: Angiosperms
- Clade: Eudicots
- Clade: Rosids
- Order: Rosales
- Family: Rosaceae
- Genus: Agrimonia
- Species: A. pubescens

Binomial name
- Agrimonia pubescens Wallr., 1842

Synonyms
- Agrimonia bicknellii; Agrimonia mollis

= Agrimonia pubescens =

Species of flowering plant

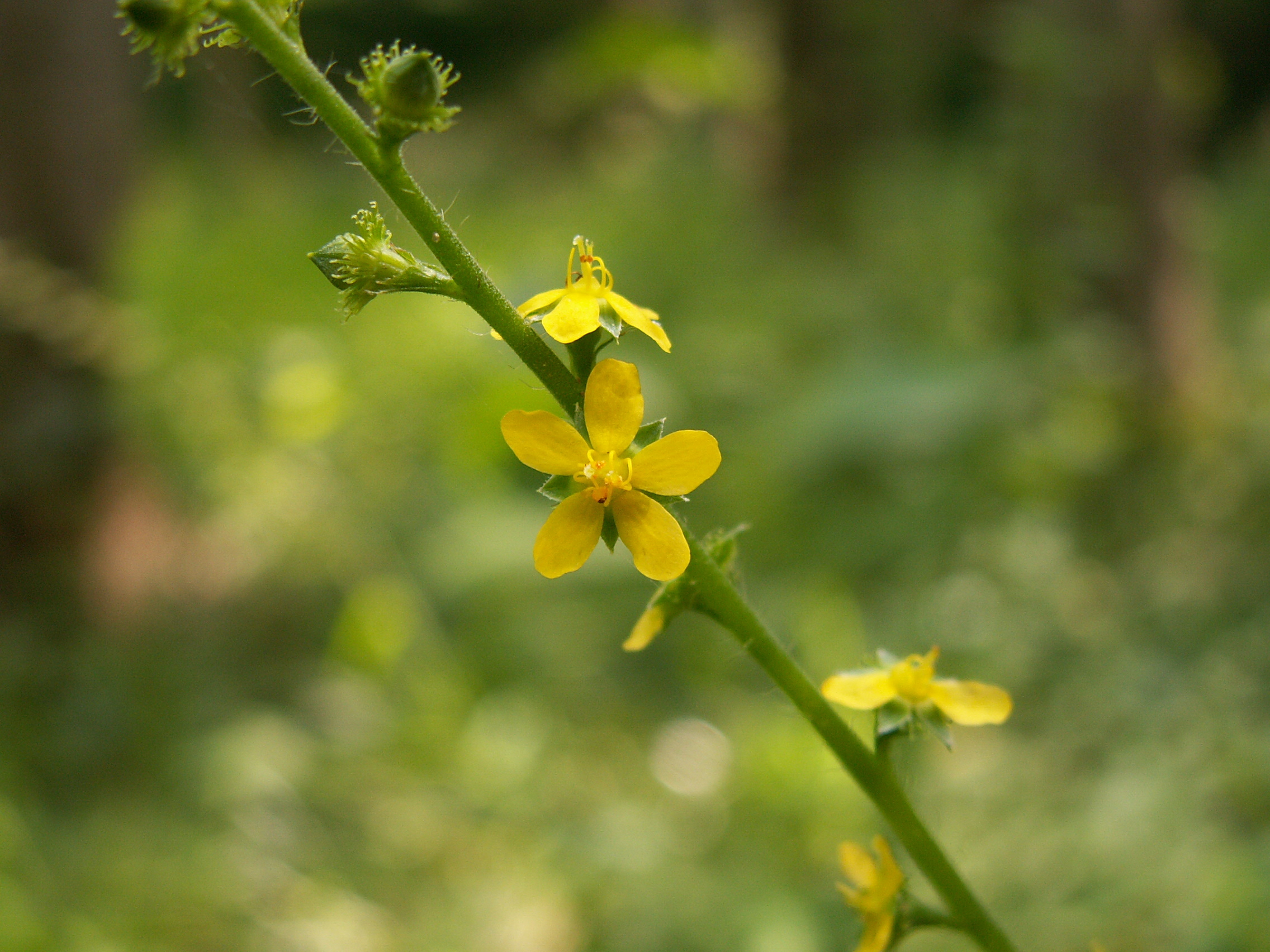
Agrimonia pubescens blooming near Pittsburgh

Agrimonia pubescens, the soft agrimony or downy agrimony, is a flowering plant in the genus Agrimonia, a member of the rose family. It grows in dry areas and woodlands.

== Taxonomy ==
The species was first described by John Torrey and Asa Gray as Agrimonia eupatoria var. mollis. It was raised to a species by Nathaniel Lord Britton after the description by Karl Friedrich Wilhelm Wallroth.

== Description ==
Agrimonia pubescens is an erect perennial, growing upwards of 40 in (1,000 mm) tall. It has erect and canescent or pubescent stems. The five to thirteen leaflets are oblong and dentate, and pinnately divided once. The leaves are lanceolate, with the terminal leaflet being the largest, measuring 1.25–4 in (32–102 mm) long and 0.5–2 in (13–51 mm) wide. The leaflets increase in size as they approach the top of the compound leaf. At the base of each petiole is oval-shaped stipule with a serrated margin, measuring approximately 0.75 in (19 mm) long and 0.38 in (9.7 mm) wide. The yellow flowers are borne on spike-like racemes. Each flower is 0.25–0.33 in (6.4–8.4 mm) wide with five yellow petals and five to ten stamens. The five sparsely pubescent sepals alternate with the petals. The small flowers and conical fruit have short pedicels. The seeds have hook-like projections and are clustered in a bell-like shape. The glabrous calyx measures 0.08 in (2.0 mm) while fruiting.

The plant flowers from July through September.

== Range ==
Agrimonia pubescens is found predominantly found in the United States, east of the Mississippi River.
