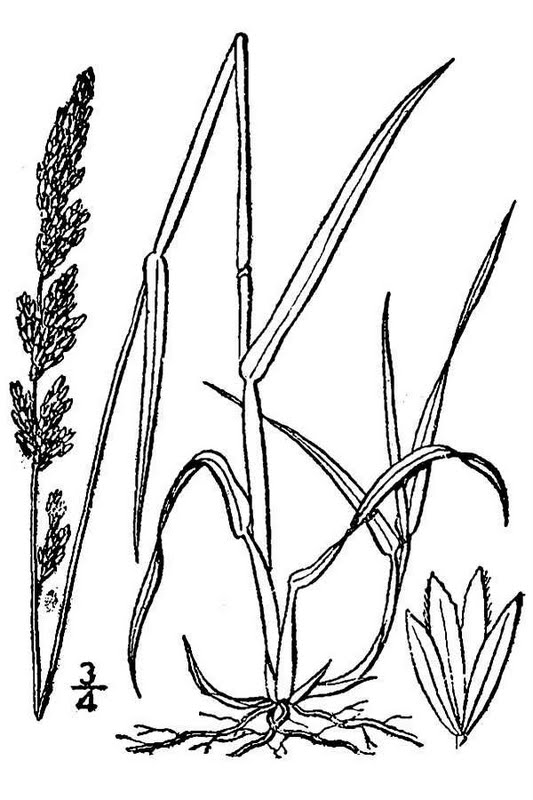
- Arctagrostis latifolia

Scientific classification
- Kingdom: Plantae
- Clade: Tracheophytes
- Clade: Angiosperms
- Clade: Monocots
- Clade: Commelinids
- Order: Poales
- Family: Poaceae
- Subfamily: Pooideae
- Supertribe: Poodae
- Tribe: Poeae
- Genus: Arctagrostis; Griseb., 1852

Type species
- Arctagrostis latifolia (R.Br.) Griseb.

= Arctagrostis =

Genus of grasses

Arctagrostis is a genus of Arctic and Subarctic plants in the grass family, native to colder parts of Europe, Asia, and North America.

Species

- Arctagrostis arundinacea (Trin.) Beal - Siberia, Russian Far East, Alaska including Aleutians, Yukon, Northwest Territories, Alberta, British Columbia
- Arctagrostis latifolia (R.Br.) Griseb. - Finland, Norway, Svalbard, European + Asiatic Russia, Kazakhstan, Mongolia, Alaska, Greenland, Canada (Yukon, Northwest Territories, Nunavut, Alberta, Manitoba, British Columbia, Labrador, Ontario, Québec)

formerly included

see Dupontia

- Arctagrostis humilis - Dupontia fisheri

== See also ==
- List of Poaceae genera
