= Commission E =

The German Commission E is a scientific advisory board of the Federal Institute for Drugs and Medical Devices formed in 1978. The commission gives scientific expertise for the approval of substances and products previously used in traditional, folk and herbal medicine.

The commission became known beyond Germany in the 1990s for compiling and publishing 380 monographs evaluating the safety and efficacy of herbs for licensed medical prescribing in Germany. The monographs were published between 1984 and 1994 in the Bundesanzeiger; they have not been updated since then but are still considered valid. A summary of the publications is available on the website of the commission; unofficial copies of the monographs are available at the Heilpflanzen-Welt Bibliothek. The monographs are a collection of official documents compiled over nearly two decades by a committee composed of twenty four scientific experts that was set up in 1978 to evaluate the safety and efficacy of herbal medicines by reviewing the extant literature.

== English translation of monographs ==
The Commission E monographs were translated into English and published in 1998 by The American Botanical Council with a foreword by Varro Eugene Tyler, a professor of pharmacognosy at Purdue University. Dr Tyler describes the German commission as unique, and "worthy of emulation."

A review of the English language monographs in the Journal of the American Medical Association describes the monographs as "Certainly worth studying," but also noted the lack of citations and omissions of possible toxic side effects.

One critic of Commission E is Jonathan Treasure, a UK-licensed medical herbalist and author of numerous herbalism monographs. Treasure's review claims that "The failure to include verifiable scientific primary sources necessarily places the entire Commission E Monograph corpus irredeemably outside the most elementary accepted standards of academic requirements for rigorous scientific publications."
