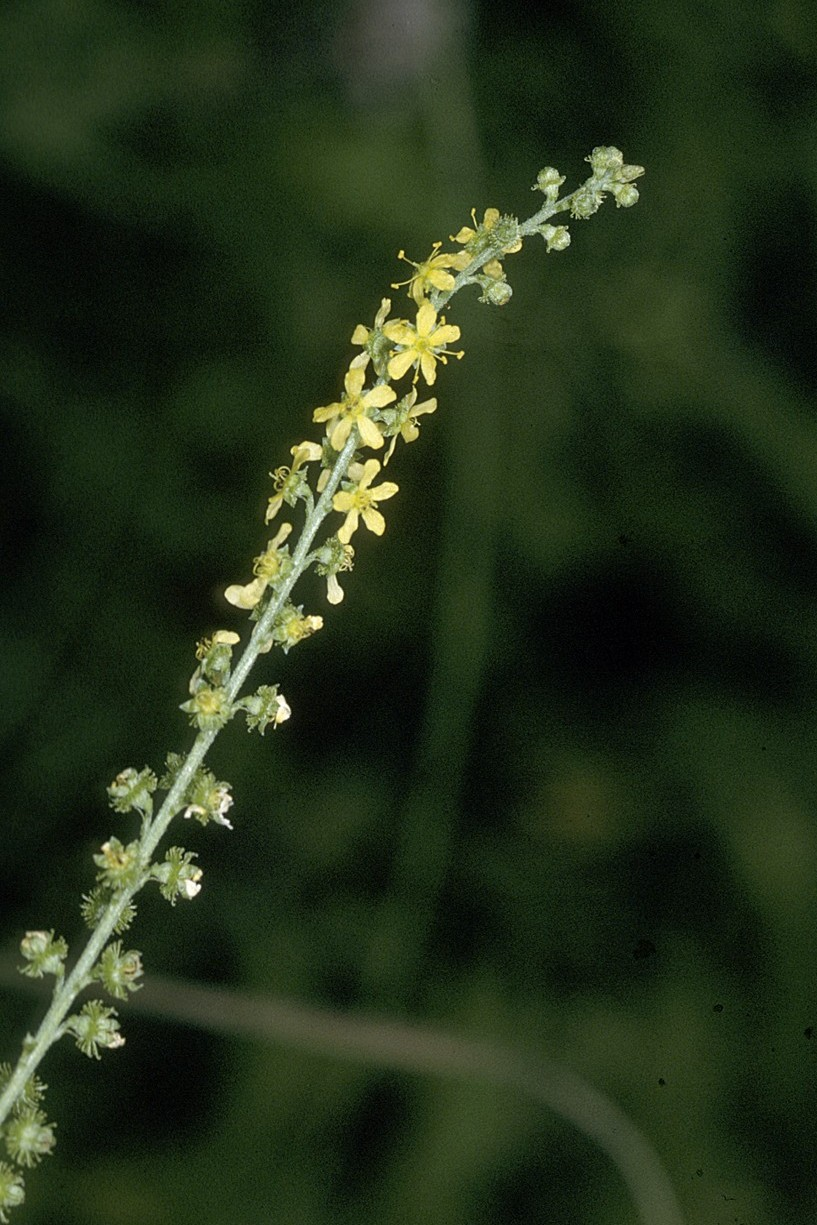
- Inflorescence A. striata

Scientific classification
- Kingdom: Plantae
- Clade: Tracheophytes
- Clade: Angiosperms
- Clade: Eudicots
- Clade: Rosids
- Order: Rosales
- Family: Rosaceae
- Genus: Agrimonia
- Species: A. striata

Binomial name
- Agrimonia striata Michx.

= Agrimonia striata =

Species of flowering plant

Agrimonia striata (roadside agrimony, grooved agrimony, agrimony, cocklebur, woodland agrimony, woodland grooveburr) is a species of perennial forb belonging to the rose family (Rosaceae). It grows to about 40 inches or 120-180 centimeters, producing a dense cluster (raceme) of 5-parted yellow flowers on a hairy stalk above pinnately-divided leaves. It is native to the United States, Canada, and Saint Pierre and Miquelon. It is susceptible to downy mildew caused by the oomycete species Peronospora agrimoniae.

The species name striata means "striped".
