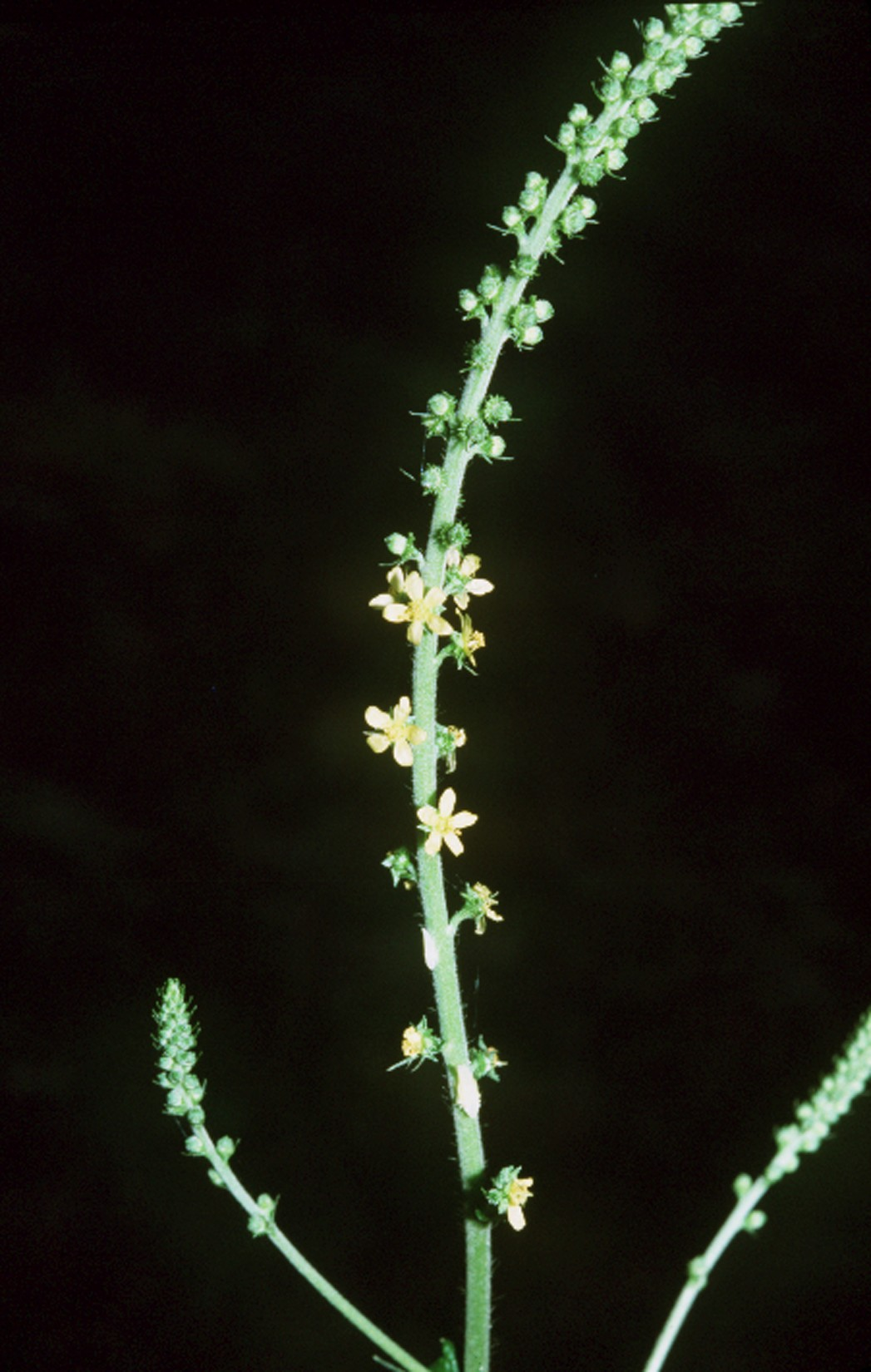

Conservation status
- Secure (NatureServe)

Scientific classification
- Kingdom: Plantae
- Clade: Tracheophytes
- Clade: Angiosperms
- Clade: Eudicots
- Clade: Rosids
- Order: Rosales
- Family: Rosaceae
- Genus: Agrimonia
- Species: A. parviflora

Binomial name
- Agrimonia parviflora Aiton

= Agrimonia parviflora =

Species of flowering plant

Agrimonia parviflora is a species of perennial herbaceous flowering plant. Small-flowered agrimony, harvestlice agrimony, swamp agrimony, and harvestlice are its most common names in the United States.

This plant species is part of the Rosaceae (rose) family. Globally, the genus Agrimonia consist of about fifteen species of plants. Seven of these species are native to the United States. Most members of this genus have small yellow flowers with large leaves. Out of the fifteen species, harvestlice is considered the most noxious weed.

== Description and taxonomy ==
Agrimonia parviflora can grow up to 6.0 feet (1.8 m) tall with long, fibrous roots growing up to 6 inches (15 cm) in length. It is an erect plant with multiple stems which grows rapidly. Harvestlice has multiple small yellow flowers in midsummer. Some plants may contain as many as 100 flowers. Yellow flowers contains 5 petals and has 5–10 stamens. The flowers are one fourth of an inch in diameter. The flowers occur in an elongate inflorescence and have a hypanthium structure. Plants will fruit and seed in the summer and will senesce in the fall. Fruit are 4–5 mm in length and are green in color. The calyx is a 10 ribbed tubernate. Stem is pubescent while the primary leaflets are glabrous on top and slightly pubescent on the underside. Compound leaves are odd pinnate and are alternating. Each leaf can contain up to 17 primary leaflets that are lanceolate in shape with toothed edges. In between the primary leaflets, secondary leaflets can be found which are much smaller than the primary leaflets and are also toothed.

== Seed dispersal and ecology ==
The bur-like fruit is distributed by mammal fur and bird feathers. The fruit is indehiscent and usually contains only one seed. The seeds can survive the winter. Nectar is consumed by bees and certain flies, other animals, like mammals and reptiles, avoid consuming this plant due to its bitter taste. Certain birds use harvestlice to build nests. Because of the aroma and foul taste of the agrimony, predators and parasites such as lice and mites stay away from constantly restocked nest.

== Distribution and habitat ==
Agrimonia parviflora prefers moist and wet grounds and is found in swamps, woodlands, prairies and roadside ditches. Harvestlice prefers full sunlight and can grow in most soils, including sandy and silty. Often referred to as swamp agrimony. Plant is found throughout Ontario, Canada. It is also found in 32 of the 50 United States. Harvestlice is distributed along the Atlantic coast from Georgia to New York but is infrequent in the coastal plain. Harvestlice is distributed as far west as Texas and South Dakota. If cultivated, these plants need little attention and care. Harvestlice can survive in −33 °F (−36 °C) weather and temporary flooding periods.

== Conservation ==
In the state of Connecticut, harvestlice is listed as Special Concern and in the state of Massachusetts, harvestlice is listed as Endangered. Agrimonia parviflora is generally common in the core of its range.

== Ethnobotany ==
Agrimonia parviflora has been used by Native Americans including the Cherokee. The burs of the plant can be used as an antidiarrheal and to help reduce fevers. The root of the harvestlice can pulverized and implemented for several medical treatments. This includes: increasing red blood cell count, gastrointestinal aid, topical treatment for certain skin issues like pox, and as a dietary aid.
