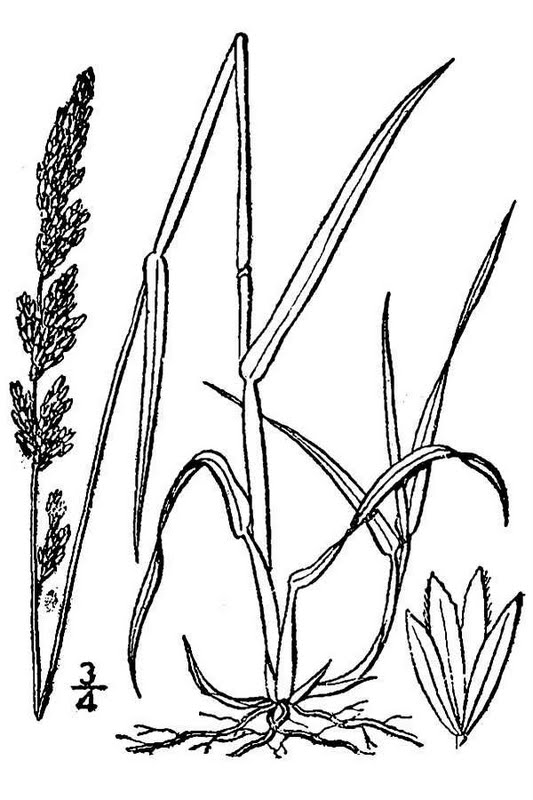
- Botanical illustration

Conservation status
- Secure (NatureServe)

Scientific classification
- Kingdom: Plantae
- Clade: Tracheophytes
- Clade: Angiosperms
- Clade: Monocots
- Clade: Commelinids
- Order: Poales
- Family: Poaceae
- Subfamily: Pooideae
- Genus: Arctagrostis
- Species: A. latifolia

Binomial name
- Arctagrostis latifolia (R.Br.) Griseb.

Synonyms
- List: Arctagrostis anadyrensis V.N.Vassil.; Arctagrostis aristulata Petrov; Arctagrostis glauca Petrov; Arctagrostis latifolia var. aristulata (Petrov) Tzvelev; Arctagrostis latifolia var. gigantea (Tzvelev) Tzvelev; Arctagrostis latifolia var. longiglumis Polunin; Arctagrostis latifolia subsp. nahanniensis A.E.Porsild; Arctagrostis stricta Petrov; Cinna brownii Rupr.; Colpodium latifolium R.Br.; Panicularia latifolia (R.Br.) Kuntze; Vilfa xerampelina Trin.

= Arctagrostis latifolia =

Species of grass from the high Arctic

Arctagrostis latifolia, the wideleaf polargrass, is a widespread species of grass (family Poaceae), with a circumpolar distribution in the high Arctic. It is a tetraploid with chromosome number 2n = 4x = 28.

== Distribution and range ==
Arctagrostis latifolia has a global circumpolar distribution. In North America, its native range includes Alaska, British Columbia, Yukon, Northwest Territories, Nunavut, Québec, Ontario, Newfoundland, Manitoba, Labrador and Greenland. In Europe its range includes Finland, Norway, Svalbard, North European Russia and East European Russia. In Asia it includes West Siberia, Irkutsk, Khabarovsk, Kazakhstan, Kamchatka, Yakutsk and Mongolia.

== Description ==
Arctagrostis latifolia is a long-lived, mat-forming perennial grass. It has a horizontal, much-branched rhizome from which aerial shoots up to 6 cm (2 in) long emerge at intervals, each surrounded by a tuft of leaves, some reduced in size. Most of these shoots are leafy, with broad, flat leaves, and only a few bear flowering stems. The inflorescence is a dark violet, narrowly elongate panicle some 5–7 cm (2–3 in) long with short branches, borne on a stout 10–20 cm (4–8 in) stalk.

== Ecology ==
Grasses of the subarctic region are an important constituent of the Arctic tundra. With other cold-resistant species in the related genera Alopecurus, Beckmannia, Holcus and Deschampsia, their high importance is due to their long life, good forage quality and the stable habitat they provide. As a polyploid species with polymorphic forms, Arctagrostis latifolia is highly tolerant to environmental stresses. In Svalbard, flowering is in August but few if any flowers set seed, and are often damaged by frost. Dispersal is mainly vegetative and clonal, with seeds, when present, dispersed in the achenes by the wind.
