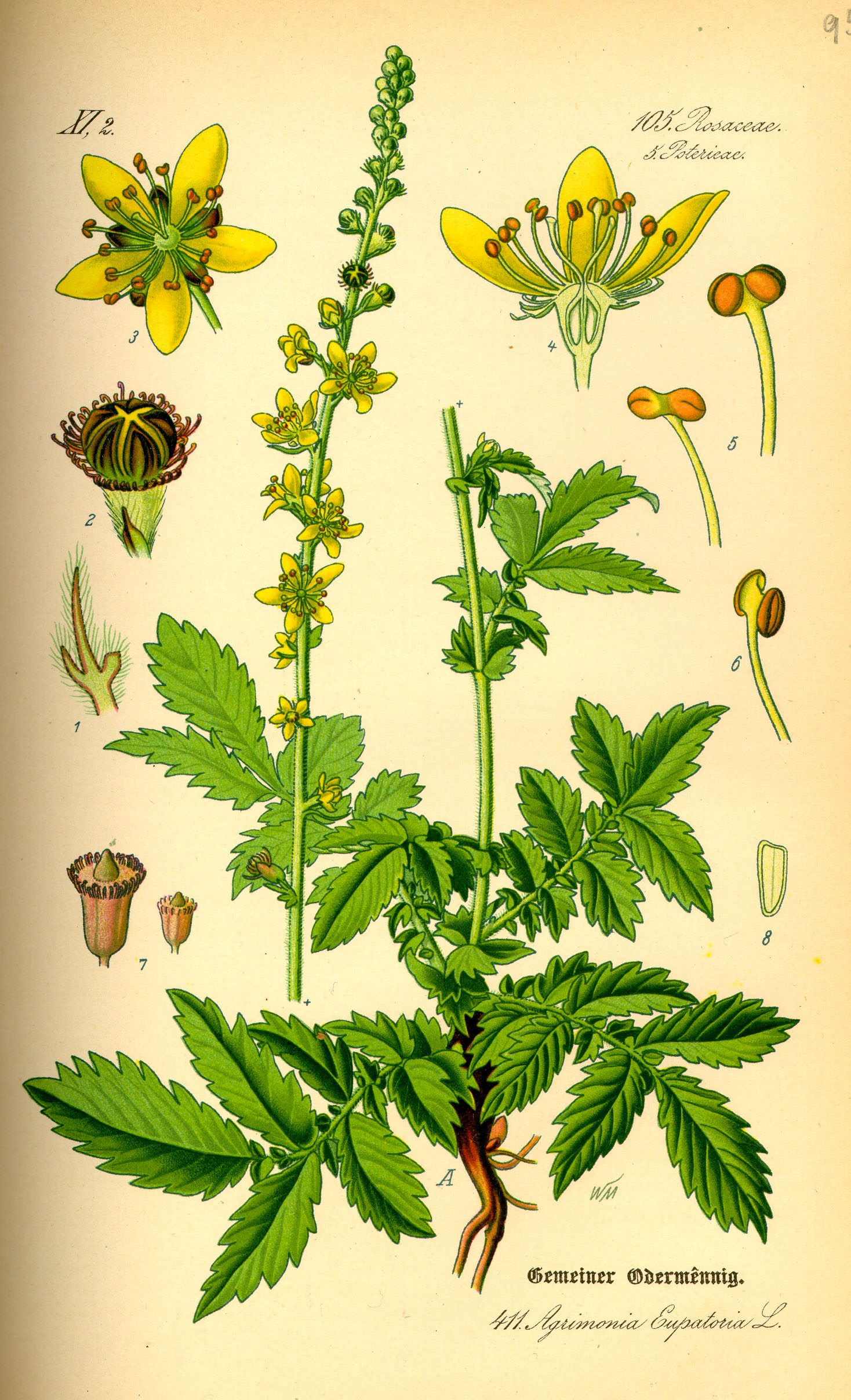
- Agrimonia eupatoria

Scientific classification
- Kingdom: Plantae
- Clade: Tracheophytes
- Clade: Angiosperms
- Clade: Eudicots
- Clade: Rosids
- Order: Rosales
- Family: Rosaceae
- Genus: Agrimonia
- Species: A. eupatoria

Binomial name
- Agrimonia eupatoria L.

= Agrimonia eupatoria =

Species of plant

Agrimonia eupatoria is a species of agrimony that is often referred to as common agrimony, church steeples or sticklewort.

The whole plant is dark green with numerous soft hairs. The soft hairs aid in the plant's seed pods sticking to any animal or person coming in contact with the plant. The flower spikes have a spicy odor like apricots. In the language of flowers, agrimony means thankfulness or gratitude.

Agrimonia eupatoria is a foodplant for the caterpillars of the snout moth Endotricha flammealis.

== Description ==
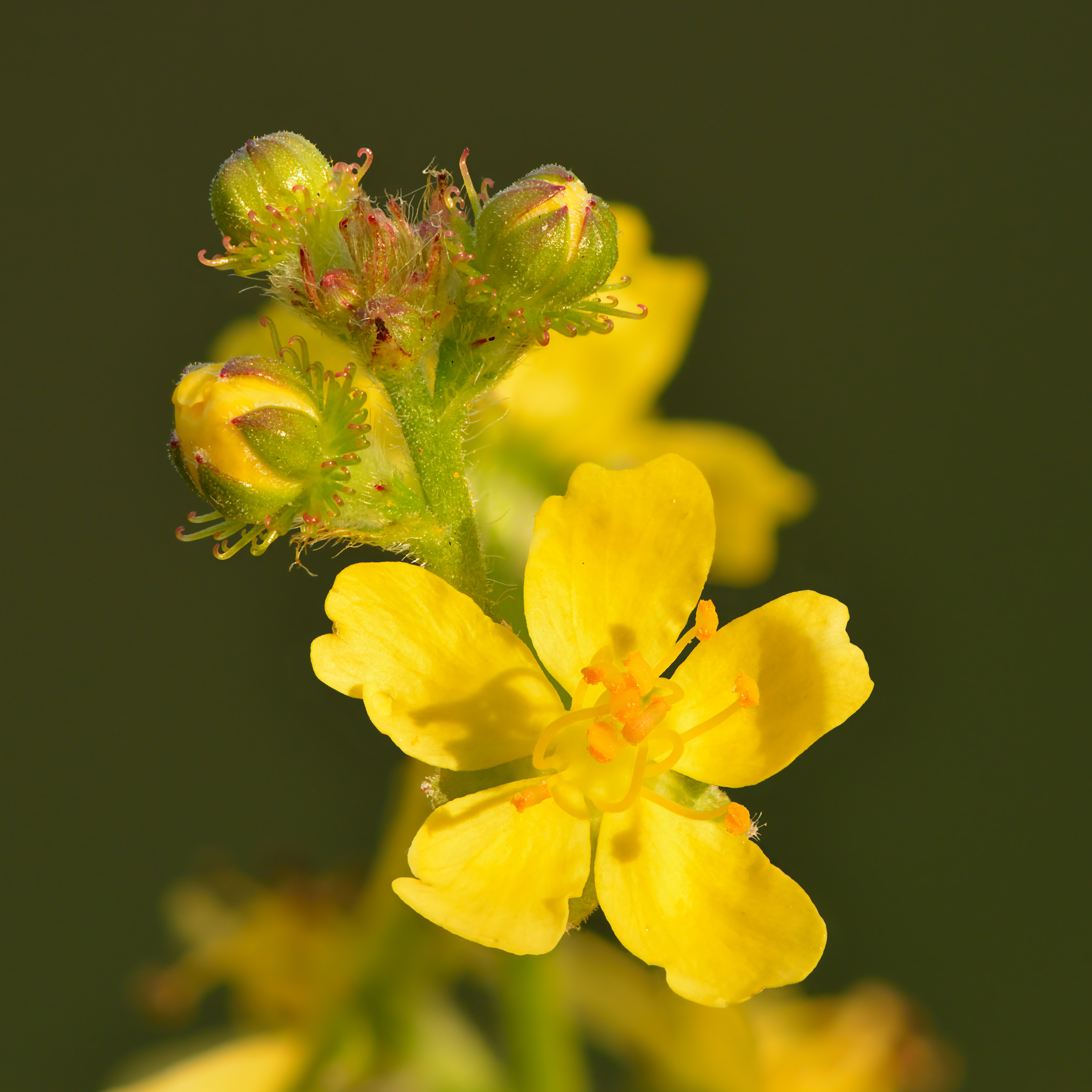
Agrimonia eupatoria flower from June to September

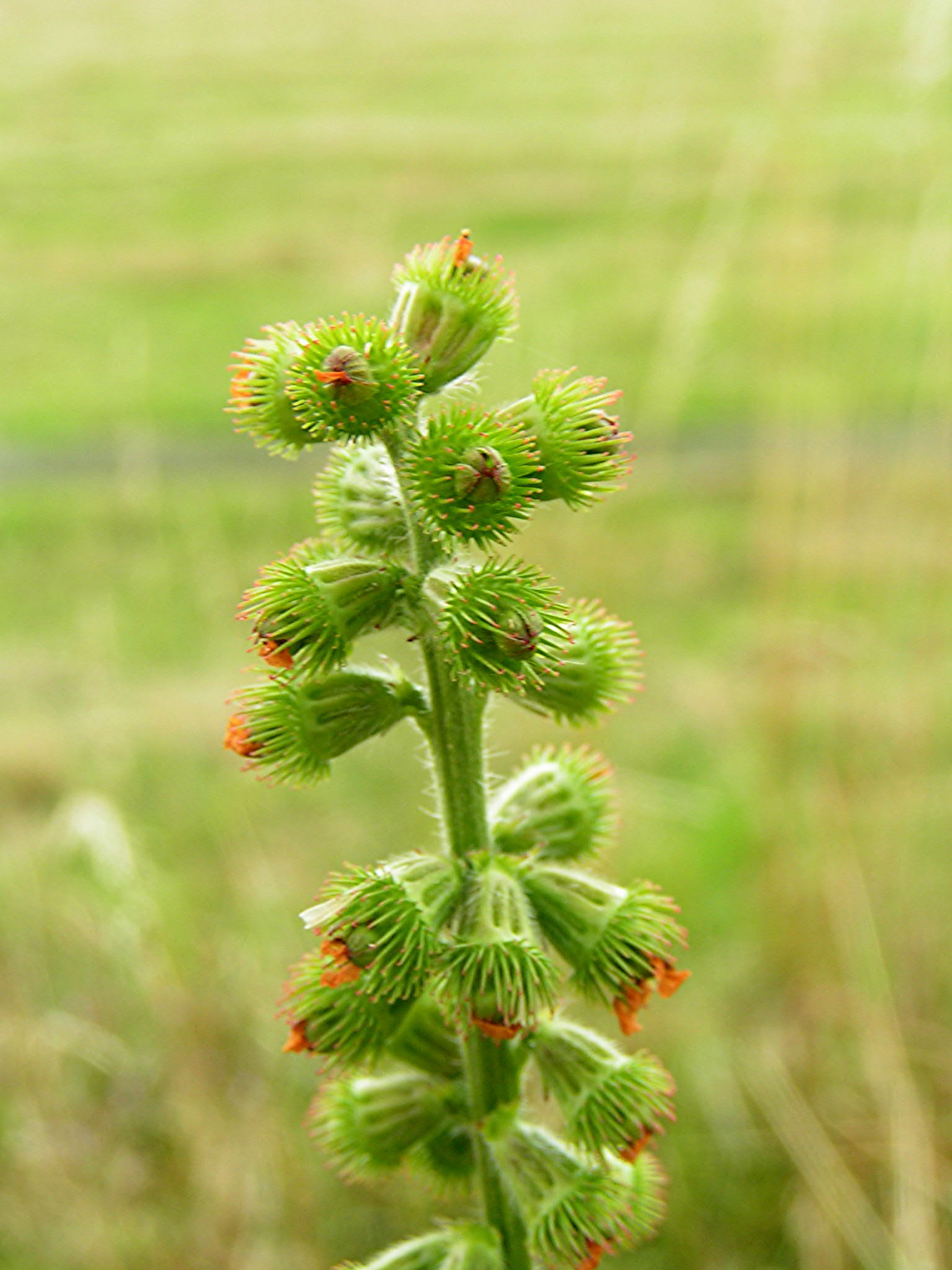
Hooked, burr-like seed heads attach to passing animals, helping to disperse the seeds

=== Vegetative characteristics ===
The common agrimony grows as a deciduous, perennial herbaceous plant and reaches heights of up to 100 cm (39 in). Its roots are deep rhizomes, from which spring the stems. It is characterized by its typical serrated edged pinnate leaves.

=== Generative characteristics ===
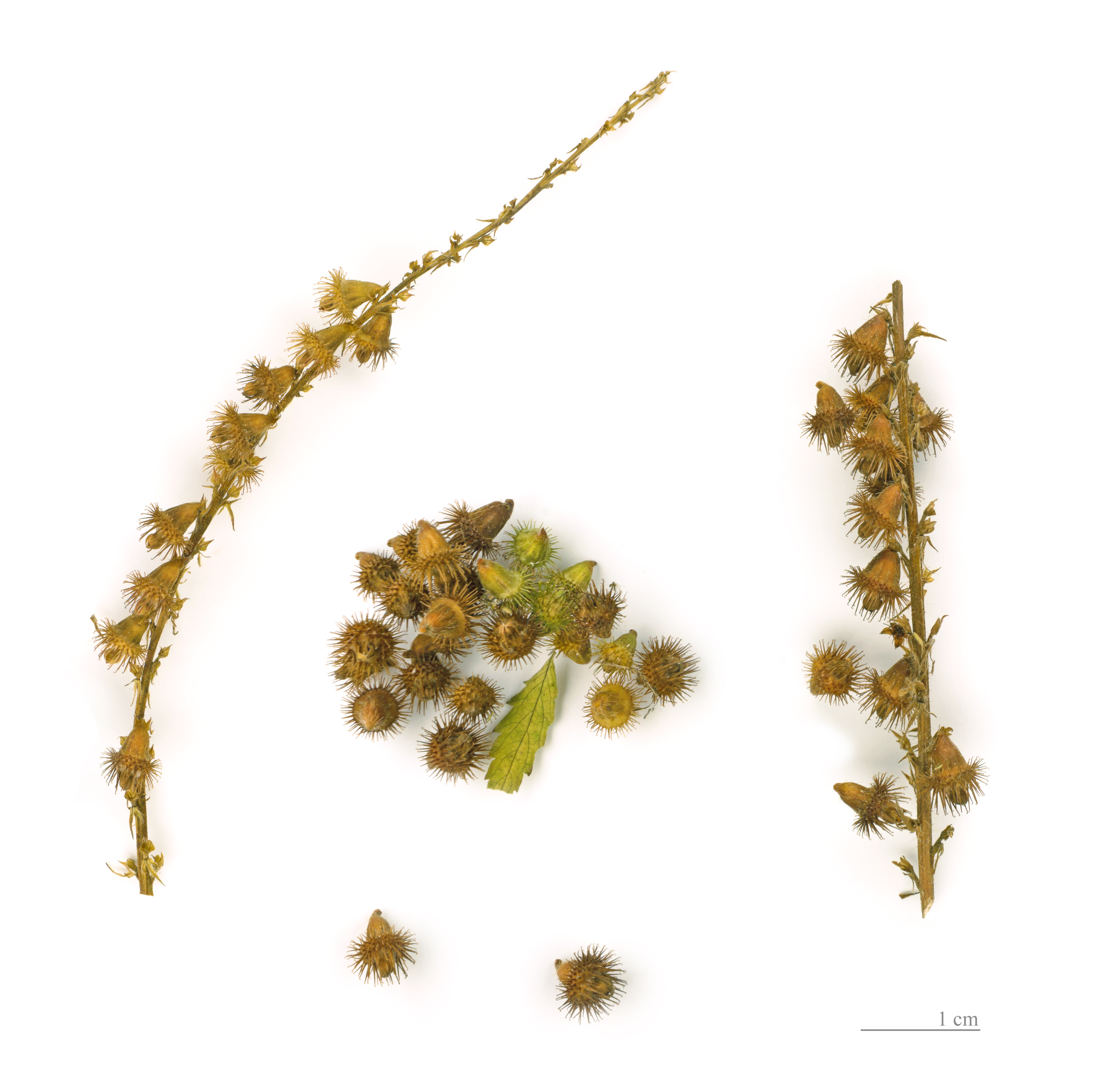
Fruits showing the burrs

The short-stemmed flowers appear from June to September, in long, spike-like, racemose inflorescences. The single flower has an urn-shaped curved flower cup, the upper edge has several rows of soft, curved hook-shaped bristles, 1–4 mm (0.039–0.157 in) long. The hermaphrodite flower has fivefold radial symmetry. There are five sepals present. There are five yellow, rounded petals. The petals and the five to 20 stamens rise above the tip of the flower cup. The two medium-sized carpels in the flower cups are sunk into, but not fused with it. The fruits are achenes approximately 0.6 cm (0.2 inch) in diameter and each have a number of hooks that enable it to cling to animal fur and clothing. Each achene may have one or two seeds.

Agrimonia eupatoria is native to Europe and Southwestern Asia, where it grows in damp meadows, pastures, along stream banks, and among shrubs.

== In folklore ==
Agrimony has been supposed to cure musket wounds by being brewed into "arquebusade water," and ward off witchcraft.

Traditional British folklore states that if a sprig of the plant was placed under a person's head, sleep would persist until it was removed.

== Ecology ==
The flowers with their abundant pollen supply attract hoverflies, flies and honey bees. They also are an important food source for butterflies like the grizzled skipper (Pyrgus malvae). The pollinated flowers develop fruits with burs. These attach to passing grazing animals, such as cattle, sheep and deer, and are dispersed over a large area.

Agrimony is found usually in young grasslands, less than 50 years old. It is a wild host for a few insect pest species (Stigmella fragariella and Coroebus elatus) that feed on loganberries, raspberries, and strawberries in Europe.

== Phytochemistry ==
The plant contains volatile oils, flavonoids, apigenin, luteolin, quercetin, kaempferol, tiliroside, triterpene glycosides, including euscaphic acid and tormentic acid, phenolic acids, and 3%–21% tannins.

== Gallery ==
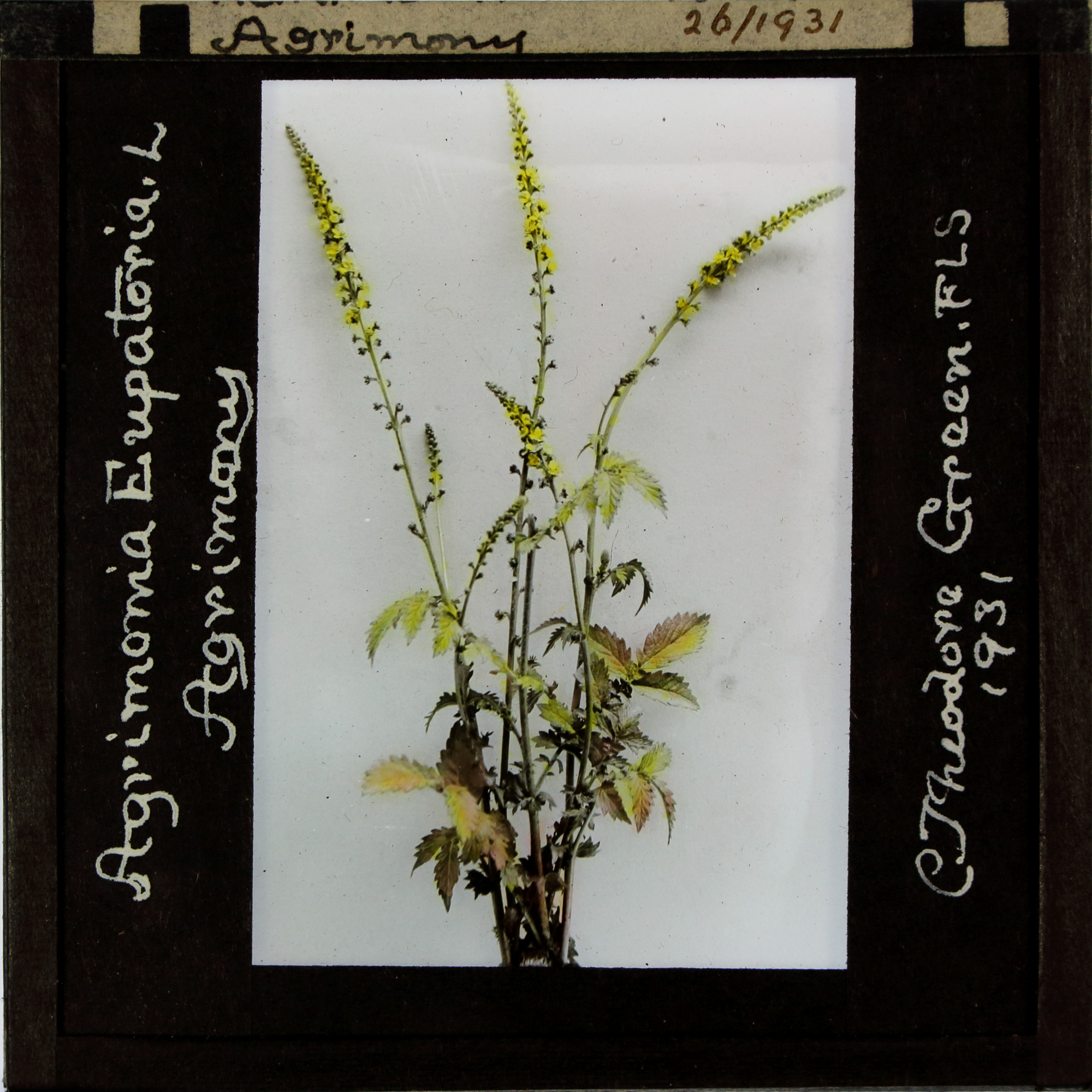
Image of Agrimony eupatoria by Theodore Green (1933)

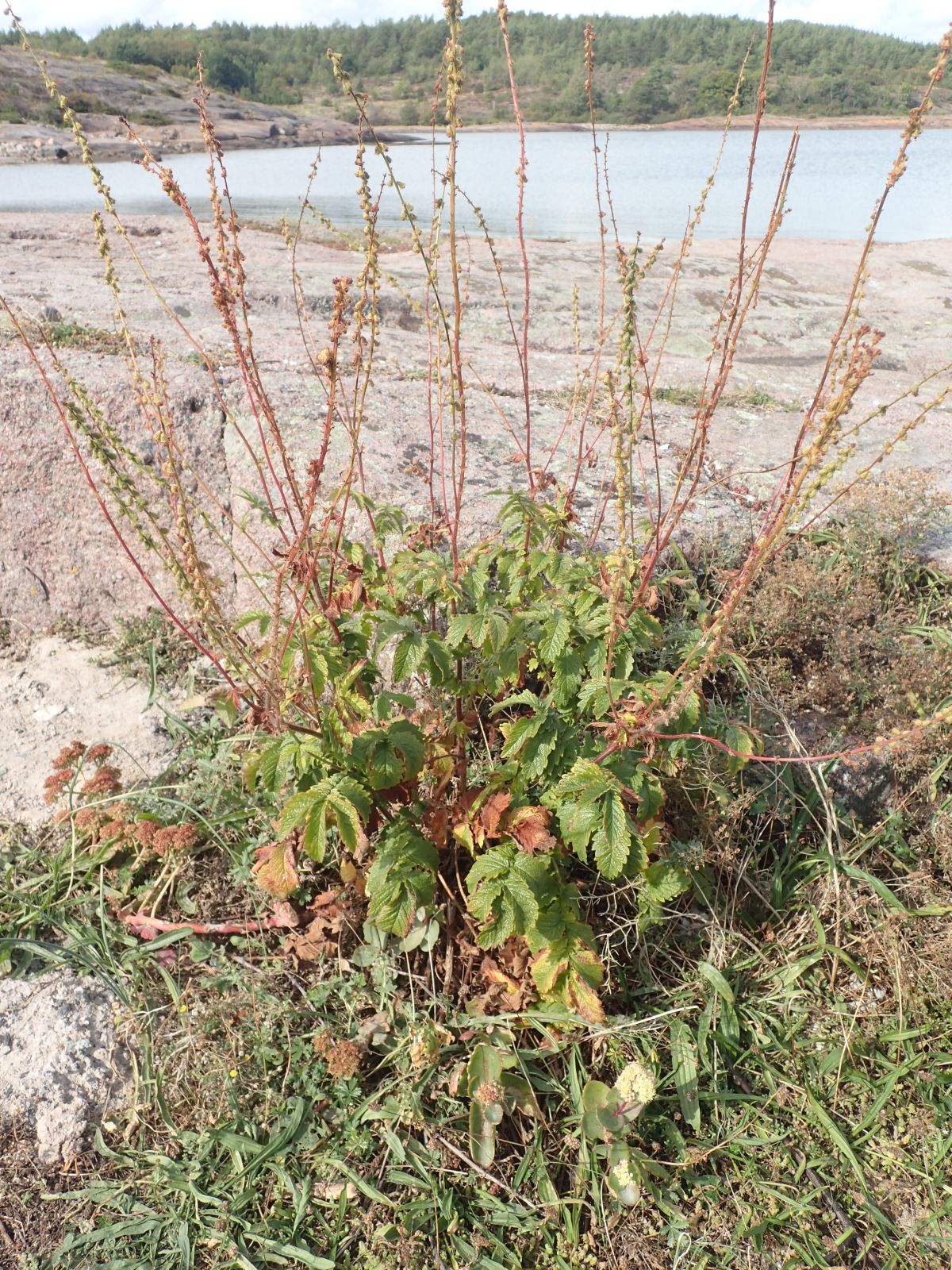
Plant in the Norwegian archipelago

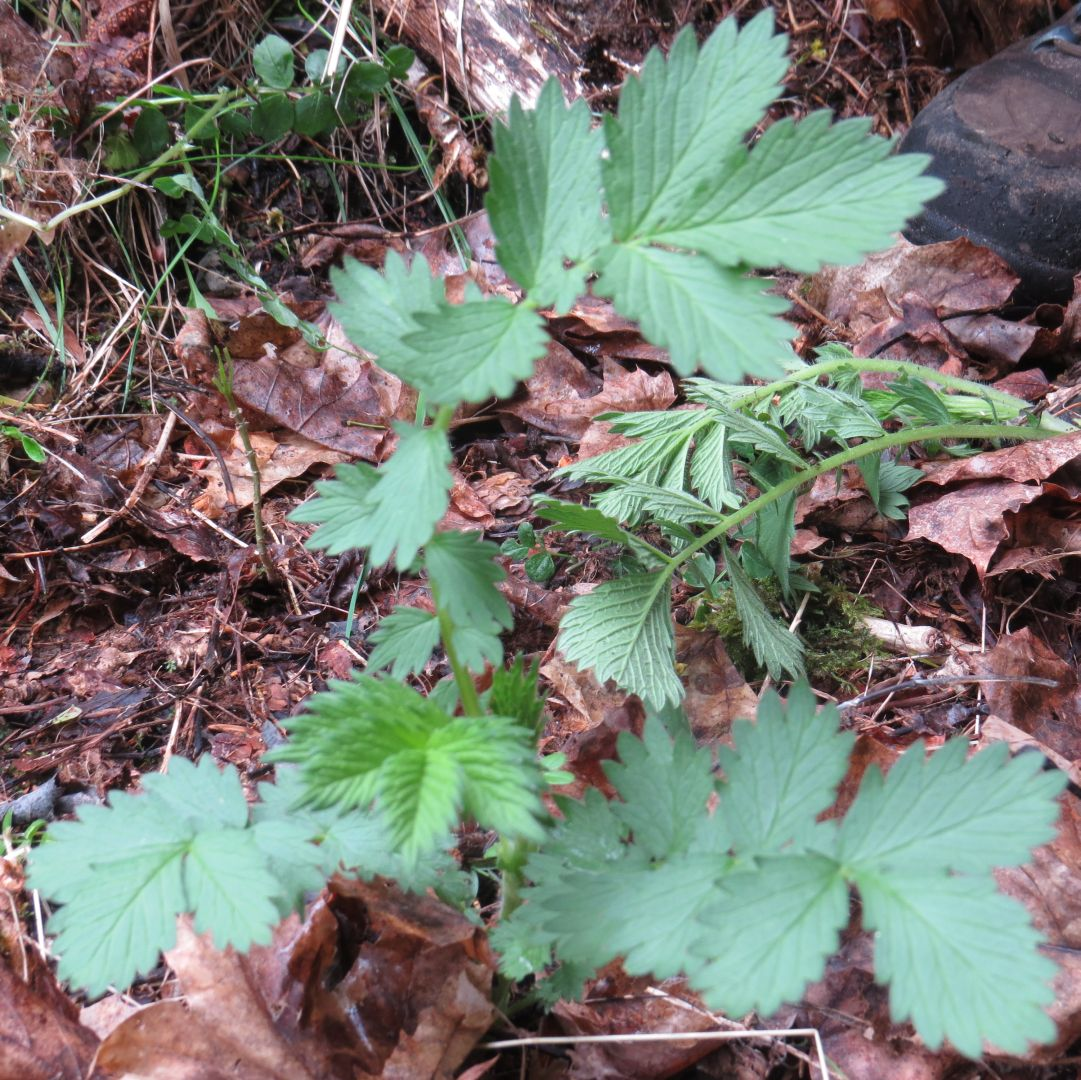
Young plant
