= Japanese anemone =

Japanese anemone is a common name for several species of flowering plant in the genus Eriocapitella of the family Ranunculaceae including:

- Eriocapitella hupehensis
- Eriocapitella × hybrida, the Japanese anemone hybrid
- Eriocapitella japonica
- Eriocapitella tomentosa
