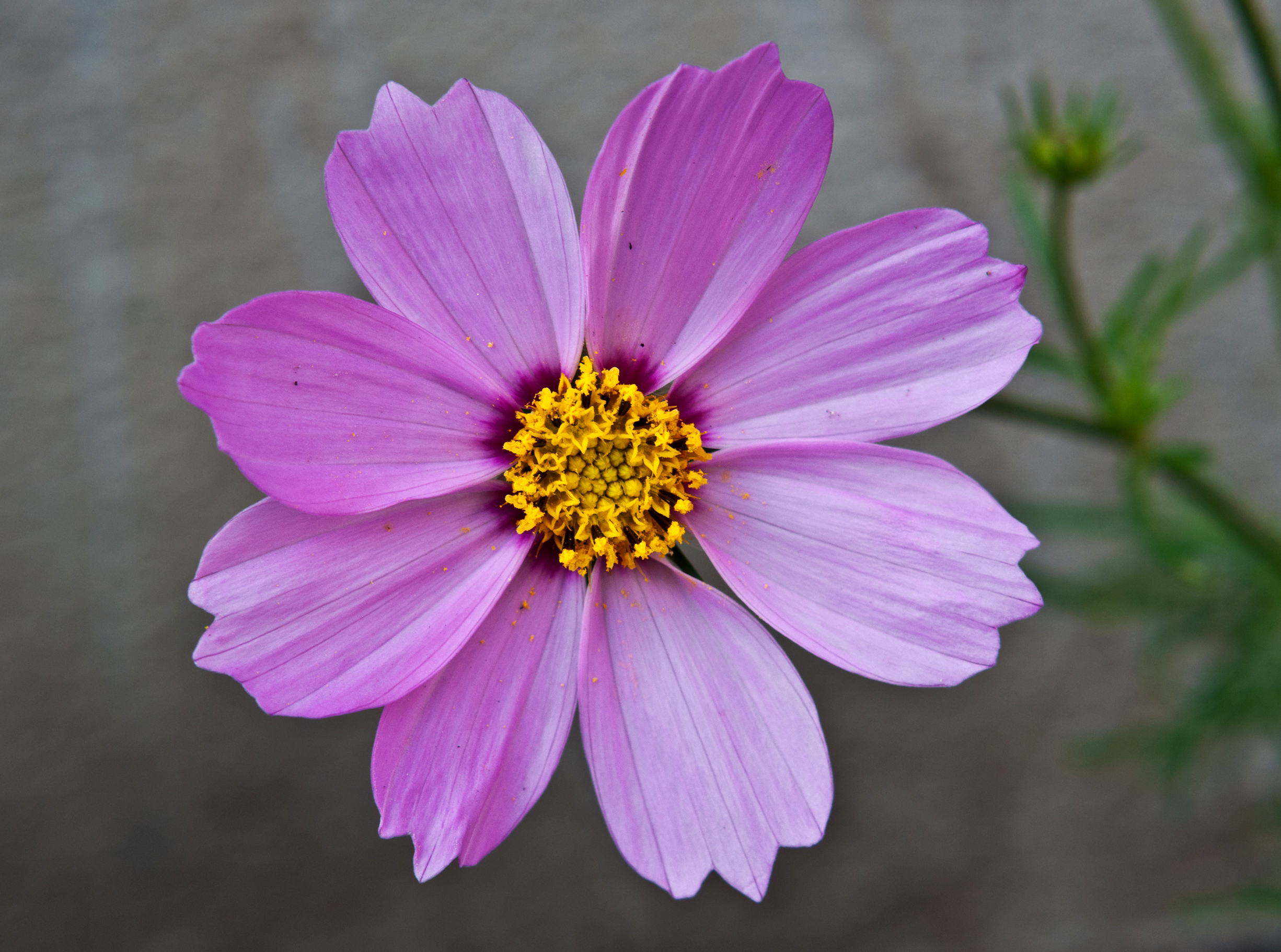

Scientific classification
- Kingdom: Plantae
- Clade: Embryophytes
- Clade: Tracheophytes
- Clade: Angiosperms
- Clade: Eudicots
- Clade: Asterids
- Order: Asterales
- Family: Asteraceae
- Genus: Cosmos
- Species: C. bipinnatus

Binomial name
- Cosmos bipinnatus Cav., 1791

Synonyms
- Synonymy: Bidens bipinnata Baill. 1882 not L. 1753; Bidens formosa (Bonato) Sch.Bip.; Bidens lindleyi Sch.Bip.; Coreopsis formosa Bonato; Coreopsis formosa Bonato ex Pritz.; Cosmea tenifolia (Lindl.) Lindl. ex Heynhold; Cosmos formosa Bonato; Cosmos hybridus Goldring; Cosmos spectabilis Carrière; Cosmos tenuifolia Lindl.; Cosmos tenuifolius Lindl.; Georgia bipinnata (Cav.) Spreng.

= Cosmos bipinnatus =

Species of flowering plant

Cosmos bipinnatus, commonly called the garden cosmos, Mexican aster or cosmea, is a medium-sized flowering herbaceous plant in the daisy family Asteraceae, native to the Americas. The species and its varieties and cultivars are popular as ornamental plants in temperate climate gardens.

== Description ==
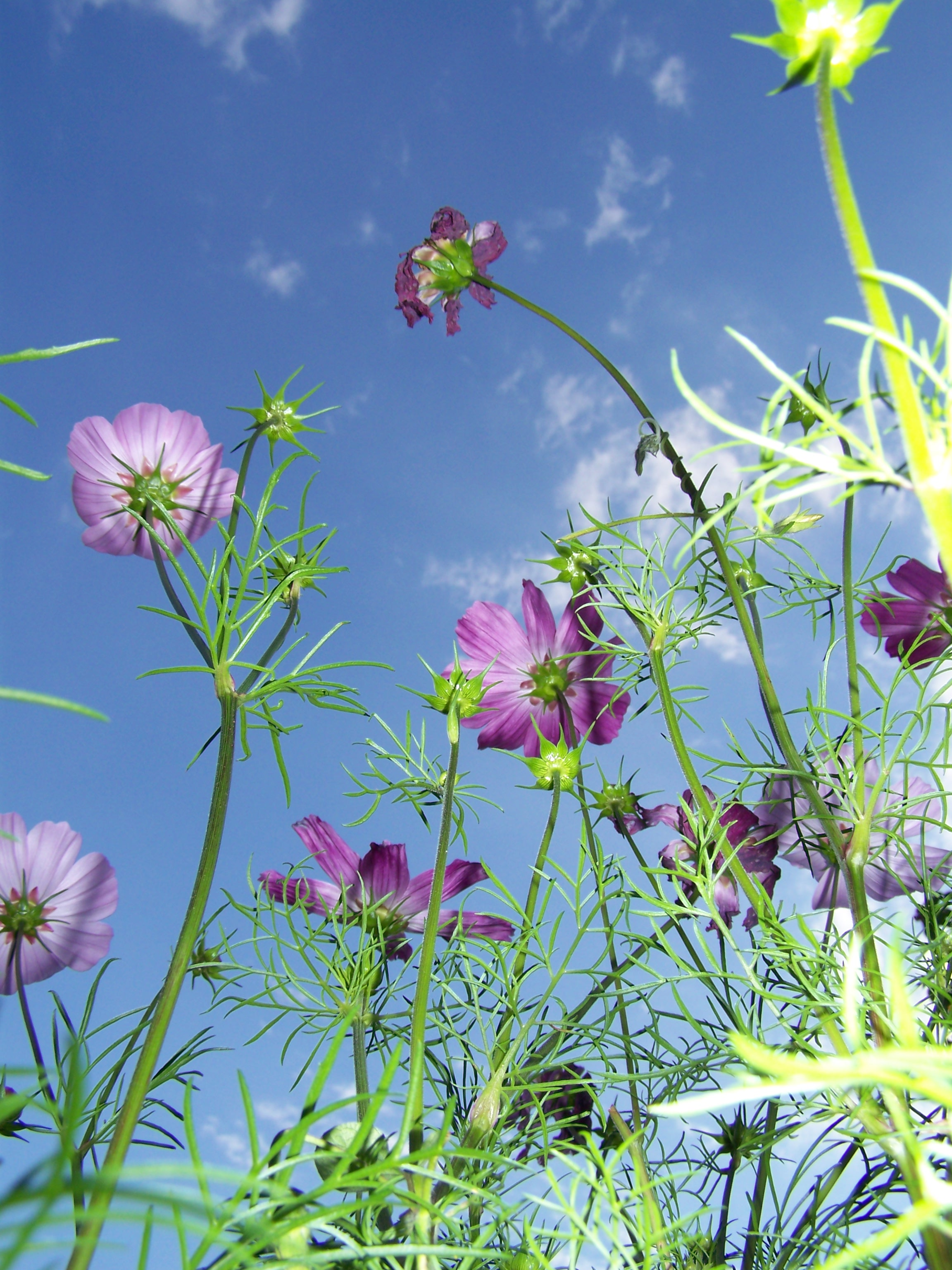

Cosmos bipinnatus is an annual that is often considered half-hardy, although plants may reappear via self-sowing for several years. The plant height varies from 60 cm to 2 m, rarely to 2.75 m. The cultivated varieties appear in shades of pink and purple as well as white. The branched stem is usually densely to occasionally occupied by fine, split up, rough trichomes, but some specimens are completely hairless. The petiole itself is inconspicuous, winged, 10 (rarely to 15) mm long, and sometimes the leaves are almost sessile.

The partial leaves are linear-filiform to narrow linear with a width of 0.5 to 1 (rarely to 1.7) mm; the tips are pointed, hardened, but not particularly sharp. Its foliage appears as if finely cut into threadlike segments. When flowering, the plants can become top heavy. This problem is alleviated when they are grown in groups, as the bipinnate leaves interlock and the plants support each other.

The achenes become blackish, are smooth or short-bristly. Their shape is spindle-like. They are rounded off into a short, 0.5 to 1.7 mm long, but distinctly pronounced rostrum. The inner achenes are up to 18 mm long, their yellowish beaks are 4 to 5 (rarely to 10) mm long. A pappus is missing or it consists only of two to three awn-like, 1-3 mm large bristles.

=== Flowers ===
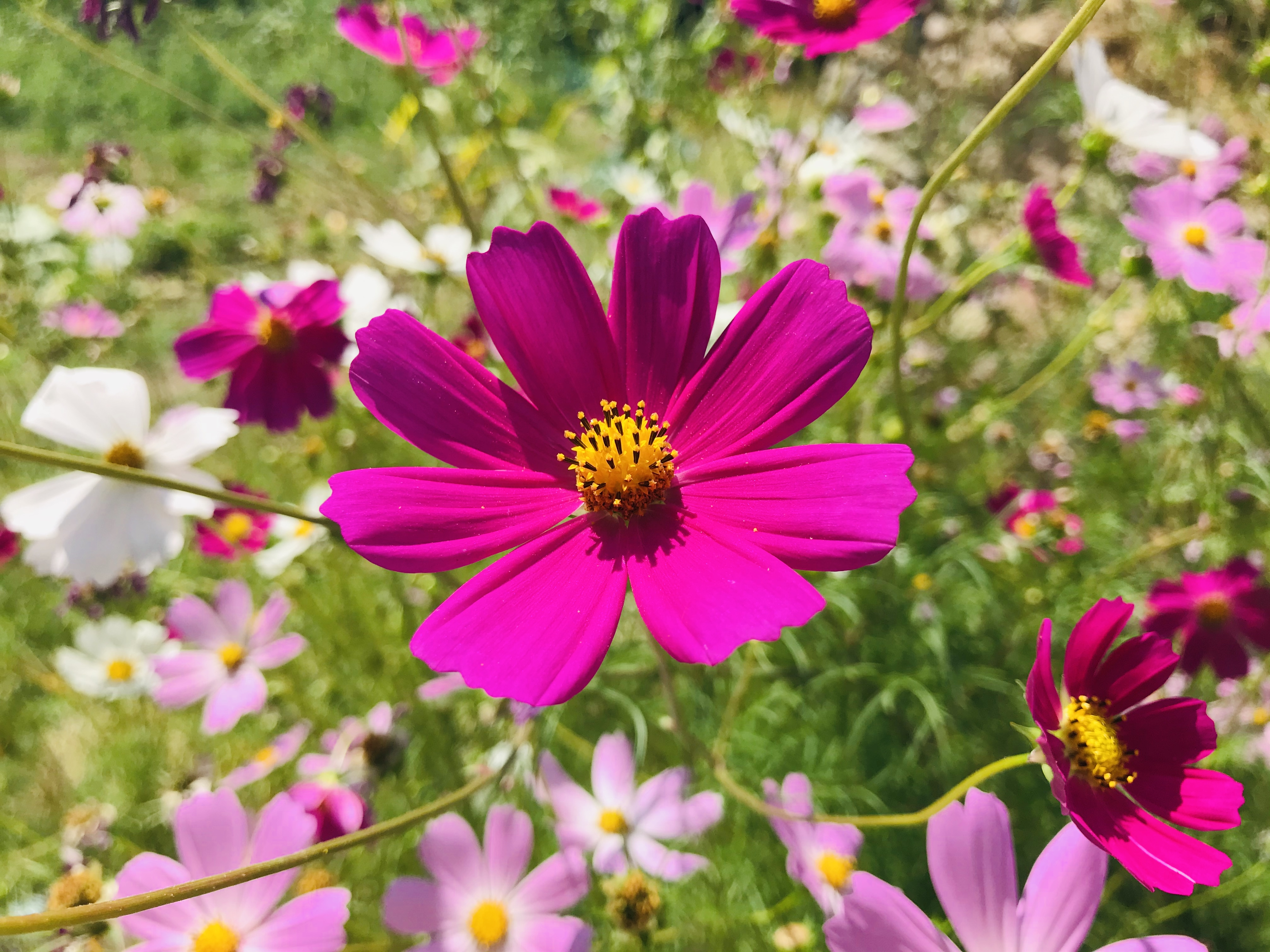
Sivas, Turkey

The very conspicuous cup-shaped inflorescences have a diameter of usually 5–7 cm (2.0–2.8 in) and contain tongue and tubular flowers, which are surrounded by bracts. There are usually 8 outer bracts, and they are ovate to lanceolate-tail-shaped, 7-15 mm long, 3-5 mm wide. The inner bracts are ovate-lanceolate and 8-12 mm long. They are translucent with many black stripes and a clear edge up to 1 mm wide, sometimes with yellowish or pink pigments, the tip is ciliate. The sprout leaves have gold-yellow, thread-like tips and protrude between the tubular flowers. The broadened base of these spreader leaves is translucent, with a yellow line.

The mostly eight ray florets are pink to violet or white colored, at the base may show noticeable stains caused by anthocyanin. The tongues are reversely ovate shaped, have a length of usually 20-35 mm and a width of usually 12-20 mm. The tips are almost dull and have three broad, wavy teeth. Below that, they are greatly rejuvenated. In the center of the flower baskets is a large number of tubular flowers (also called disc florets), whose overgrown petals are yellow, turn white in the lower part and reach a length of 5-6 mm. The anthers are brownish-black and about 3 mm long, at the tips are short-triangular, translucent attachments with a length of 0.5-0.8 mm. The branches of the stylus are short and rather dull, with a length of .5 mm.

== Distribution ==
According to Plants of the World Online this plant is native to Mexico. However, other sources list it as native to the United States and Canada. Since it is used as an ornamental plant in many countries and prone to naturalization, it is an invasive plant in many areas of the world. It has naturalized in scattered locations across North America, South America, the West Indies, Italy, Australia, and Asia, where it is a garden escape (introduced species) and in some habitats becoming a weed.

== Cultivars ==
Cultivars of Cosmos bipinnatus in cultivation today are listed here. Those marked agm have gained the Royal Horticultural Society's Award of Garden Merit.

- Apollo Series
  - 'Apollo Carmine' agm
  - 'Apollo Pink' agm
  - 'Apollo White' agm
- 'Daydream' features a pink inner ring on a white background
- Double Click Series features semidouble to fully double flowers that resemble Japanese anemones (Anemone japonica)
  - 'Double Click Cranberries'
  - 'Double Click Rose Bonbon'
  - 'Double Click Snow Puff'
  - 'Double Click Vari Extra'
- 'Rubenza' agm
- 'Sensation', also known as 'Early Sensation', is a widely available mix of tall varieties
  - 'Sensation Pinkie' agm
- Sonata series
- 'Velouette' agm
- 'Versailles', developed for the cut flower trade, are shorter than others of the species, with heights remaining below three feet
  - 'Versailles Dark Rose'
  - 'Versailles Tetra'

== Cultivation ==
Growth characteristics of this plant include:

- Germination takes between 7 and 10 days at the optimal temperature of 75 °F (24 °C); flowering begins between 60 and 90 days after germination
- It prefers a soil pH between 6.0 and 8.5, reflecting its native habitat in the alkaline regions of Central America
- Flowering is best in full sun, although partial shade is tolerated

Excessive rain can cause cultivation problems, due to the delicate nature of the stems. Heavy rain can cause breakage. Cosmos bipinnatus can tolerate heat as long as adequate moisture is provided, however, it does not handle droughts, strong winds or cold temperatures well. Snails, slugs and aphids have a taste for Cosmos bipinnatus. Successfully cultivated plants can mature 2 to 4 feet (0.61 to 1.22 m) x 12 to 18 inches (300 to 460 mm).

- They are not tolerant of frost, but can be grown outdoors in a temperate climate with a warm to hot summer and are therefore called half-hardy in British gardening literature.

== Pollinators ==
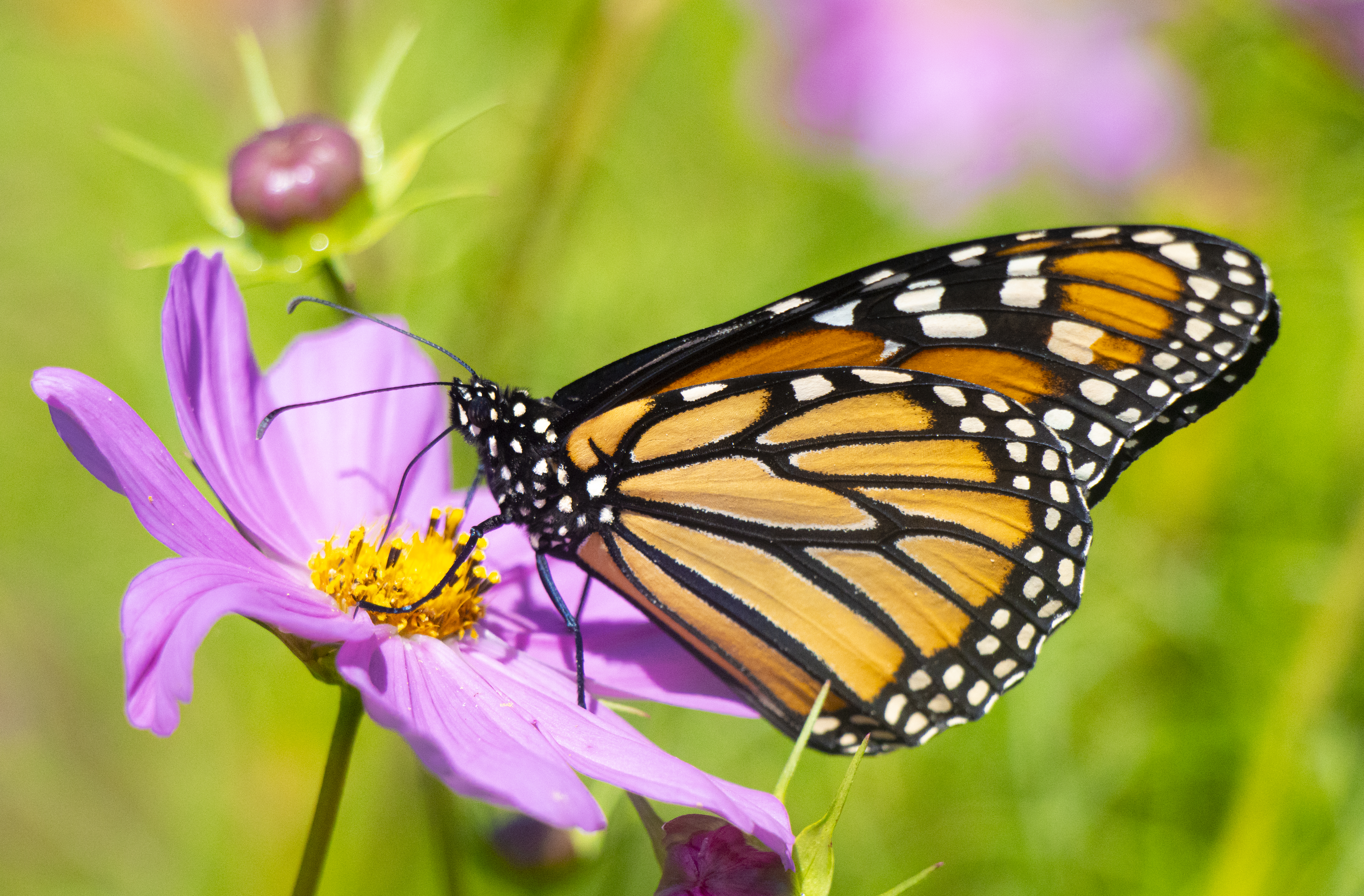
A Monarch Butterfly feeding on a flower

The flowers of Cosmos bipinnatus attract birds and butterflies, including the monarch butterfly. It can be part of butterfly gardening and pollinator/honey-bee habitat gardens.

== Gallery ==
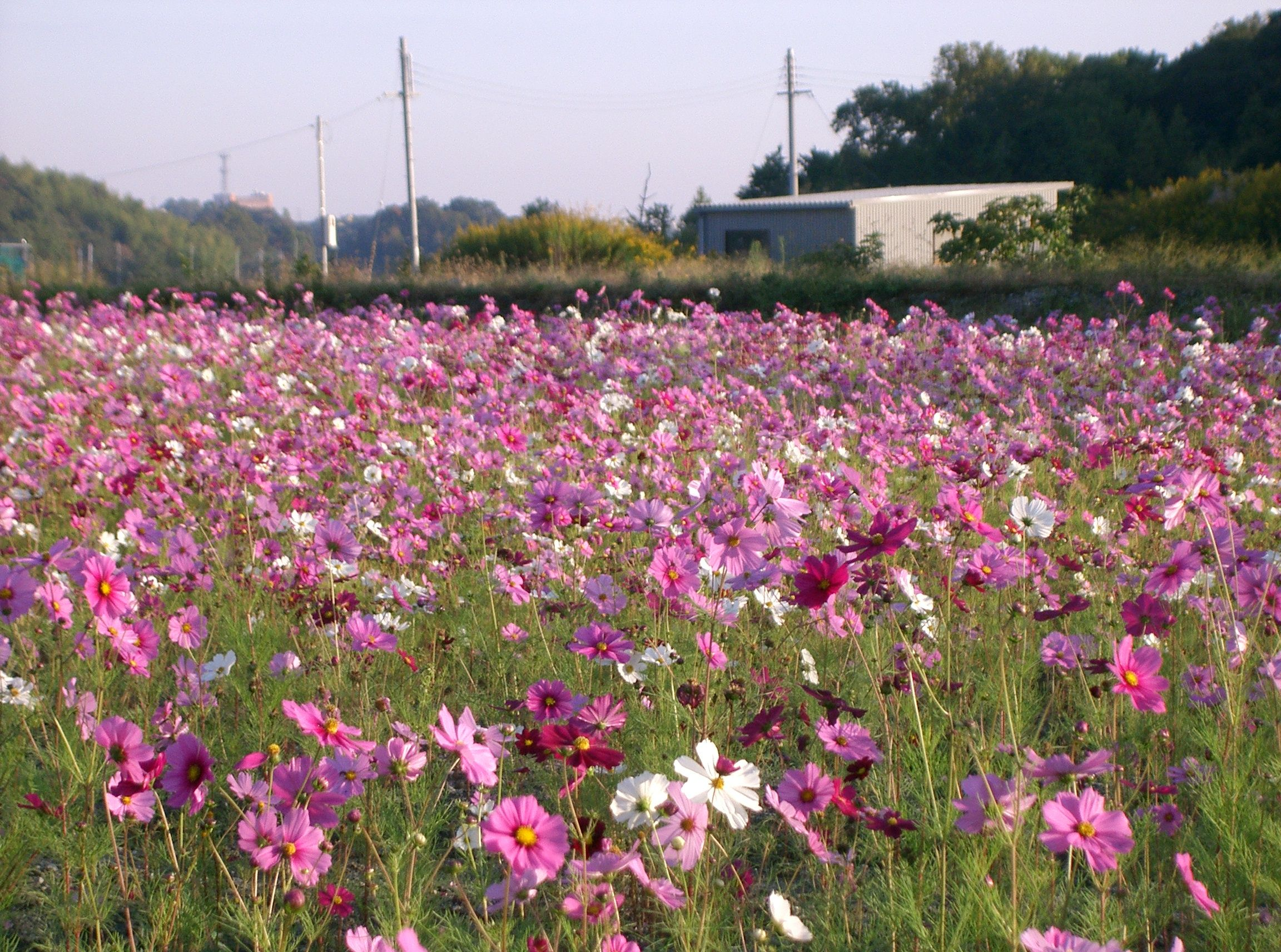
Typical range of colours in a dense stand

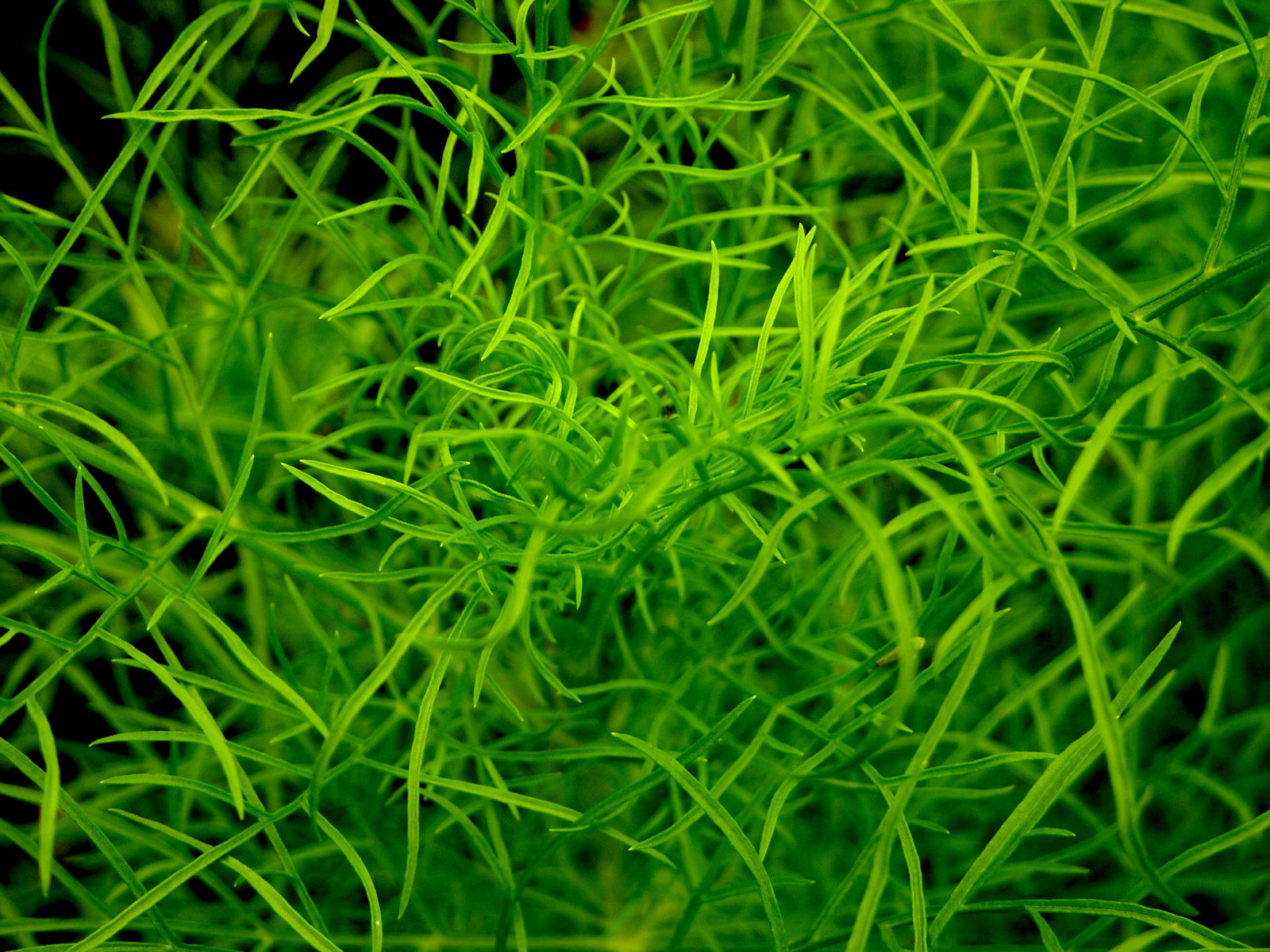

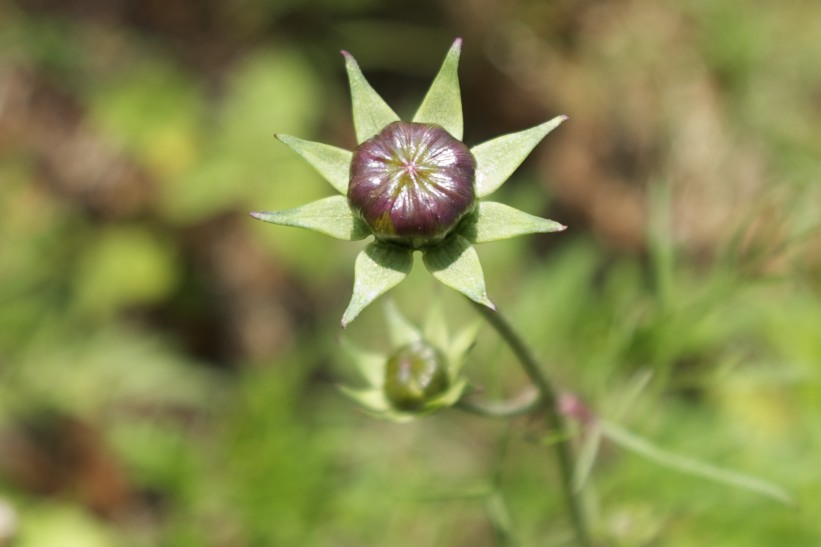

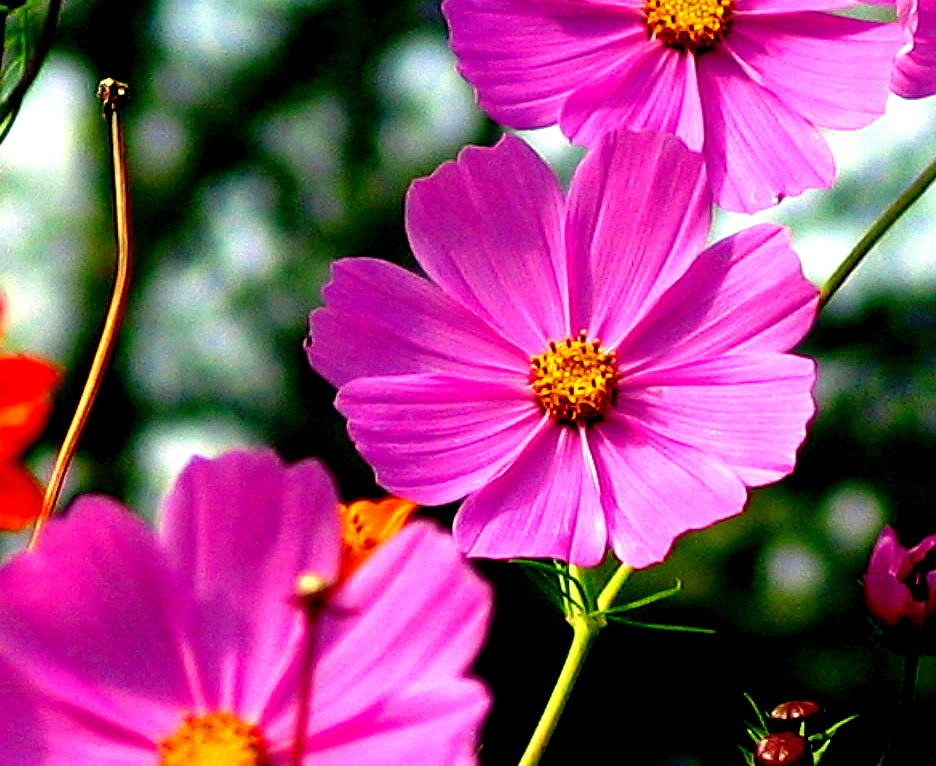

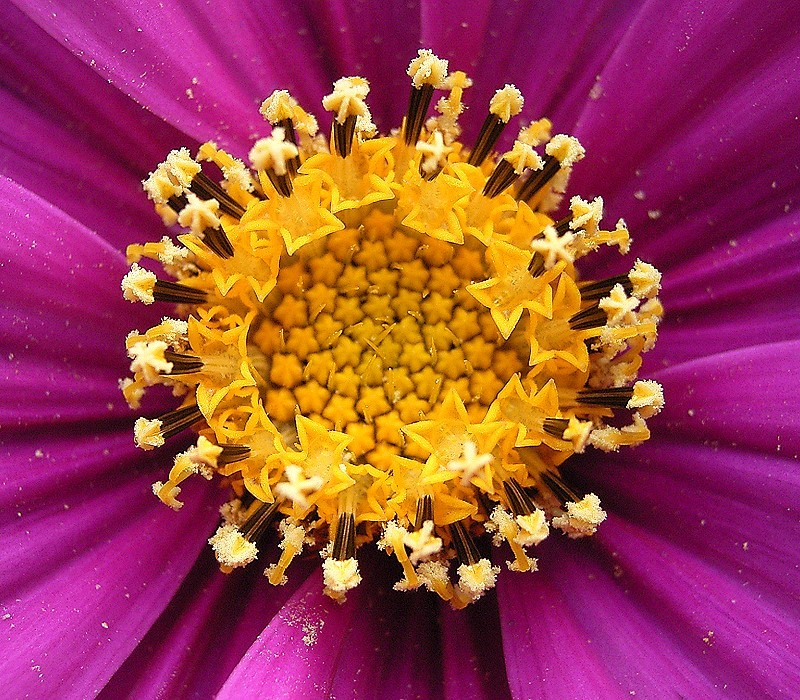

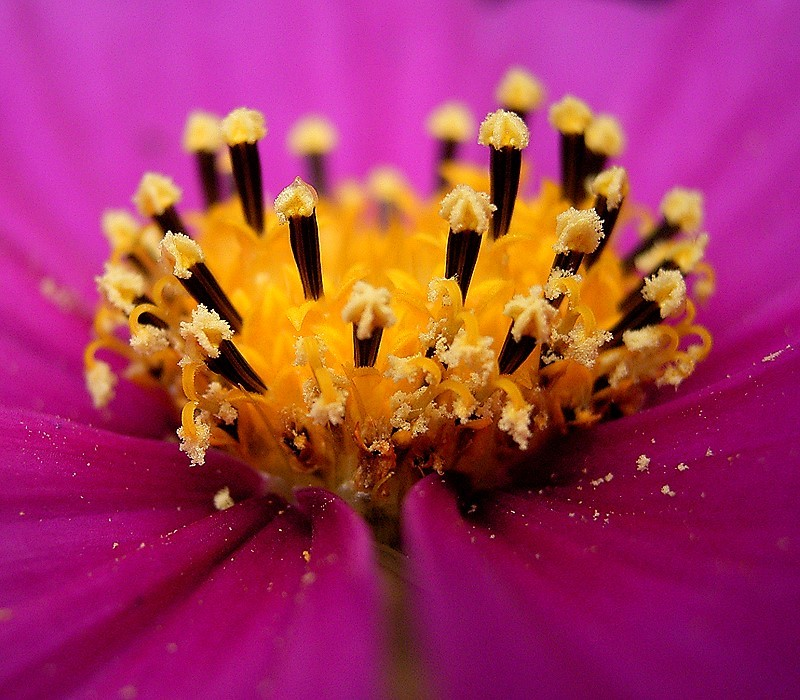
Lateral aspect

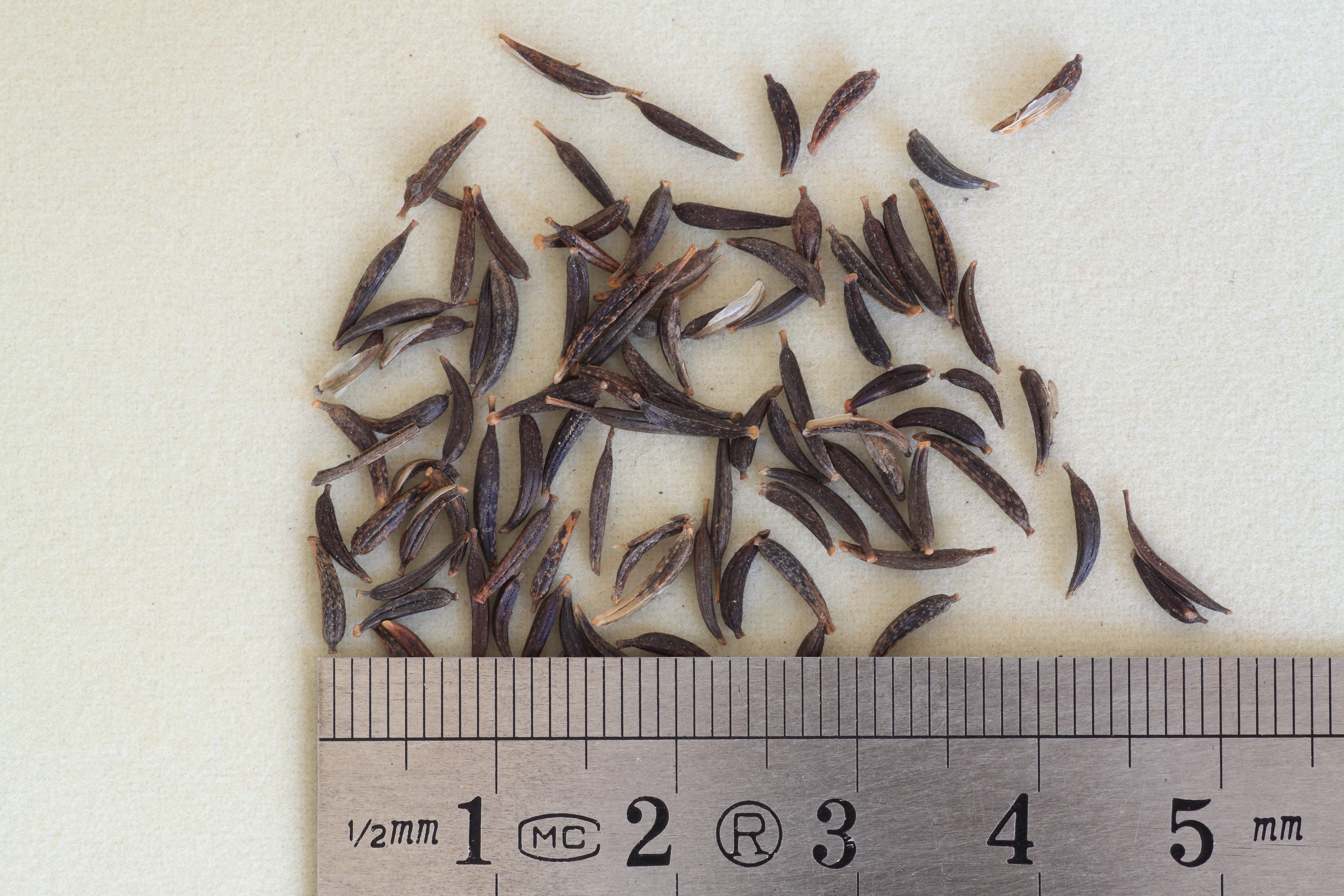
Seeds

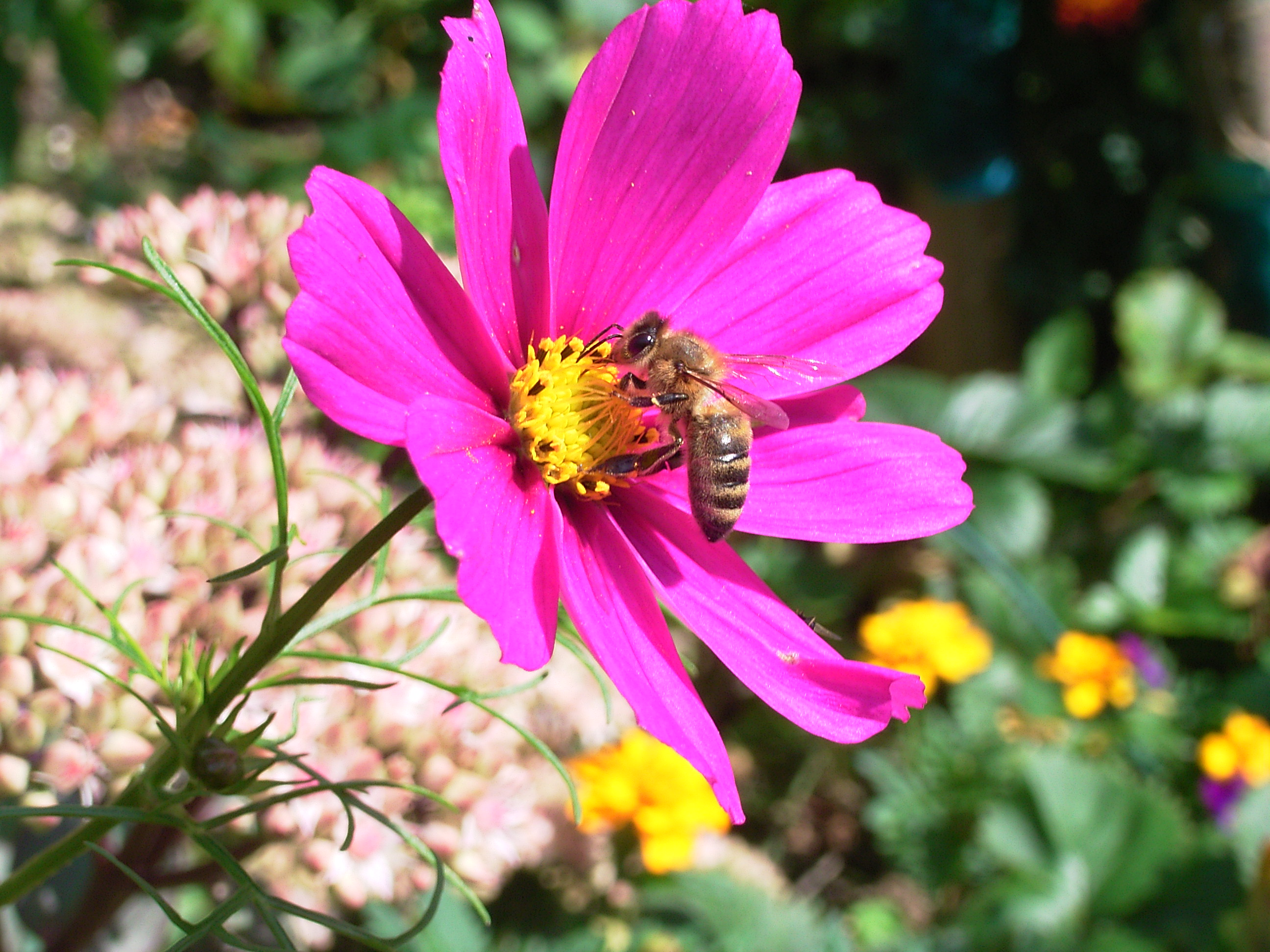

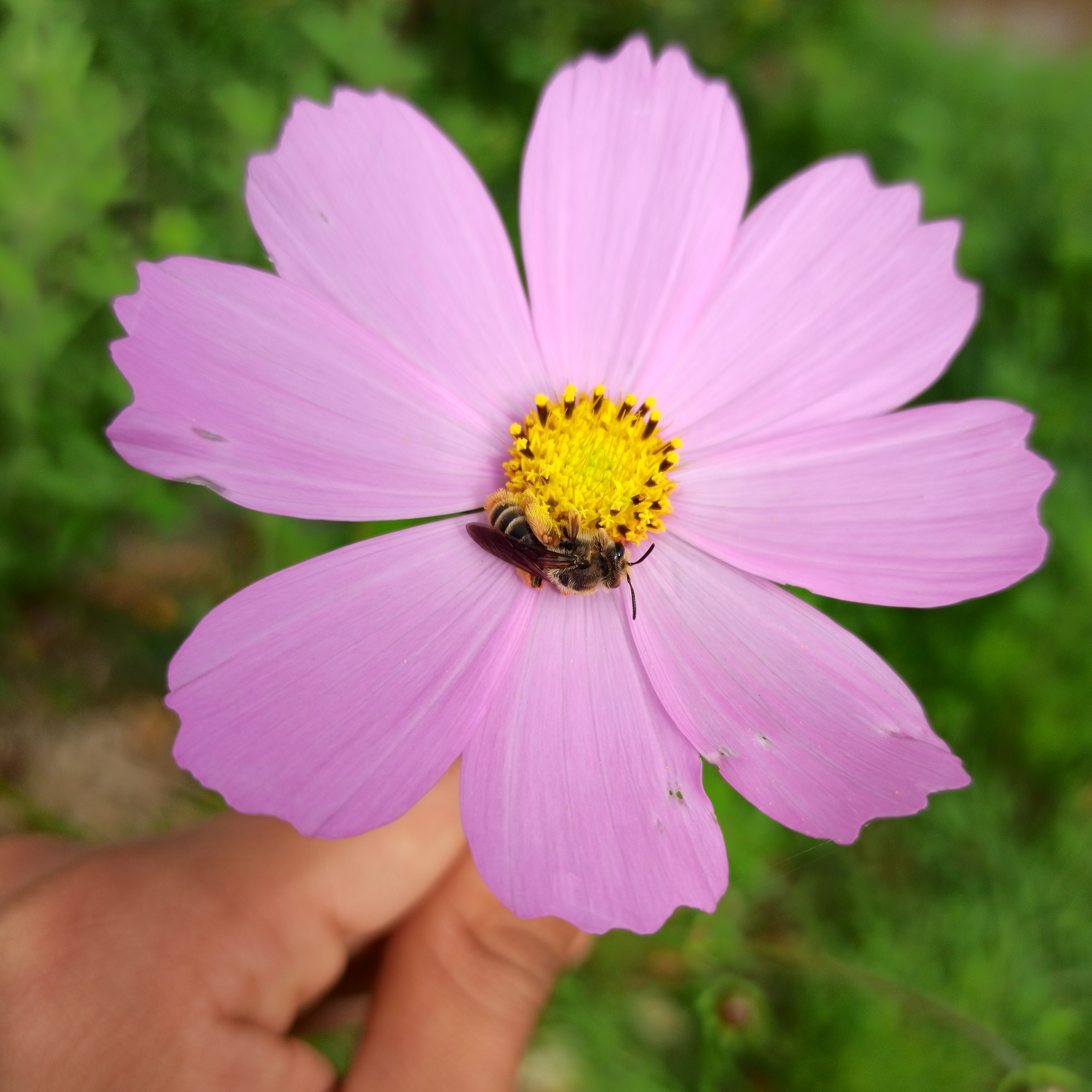
Andrena sp. pollinating

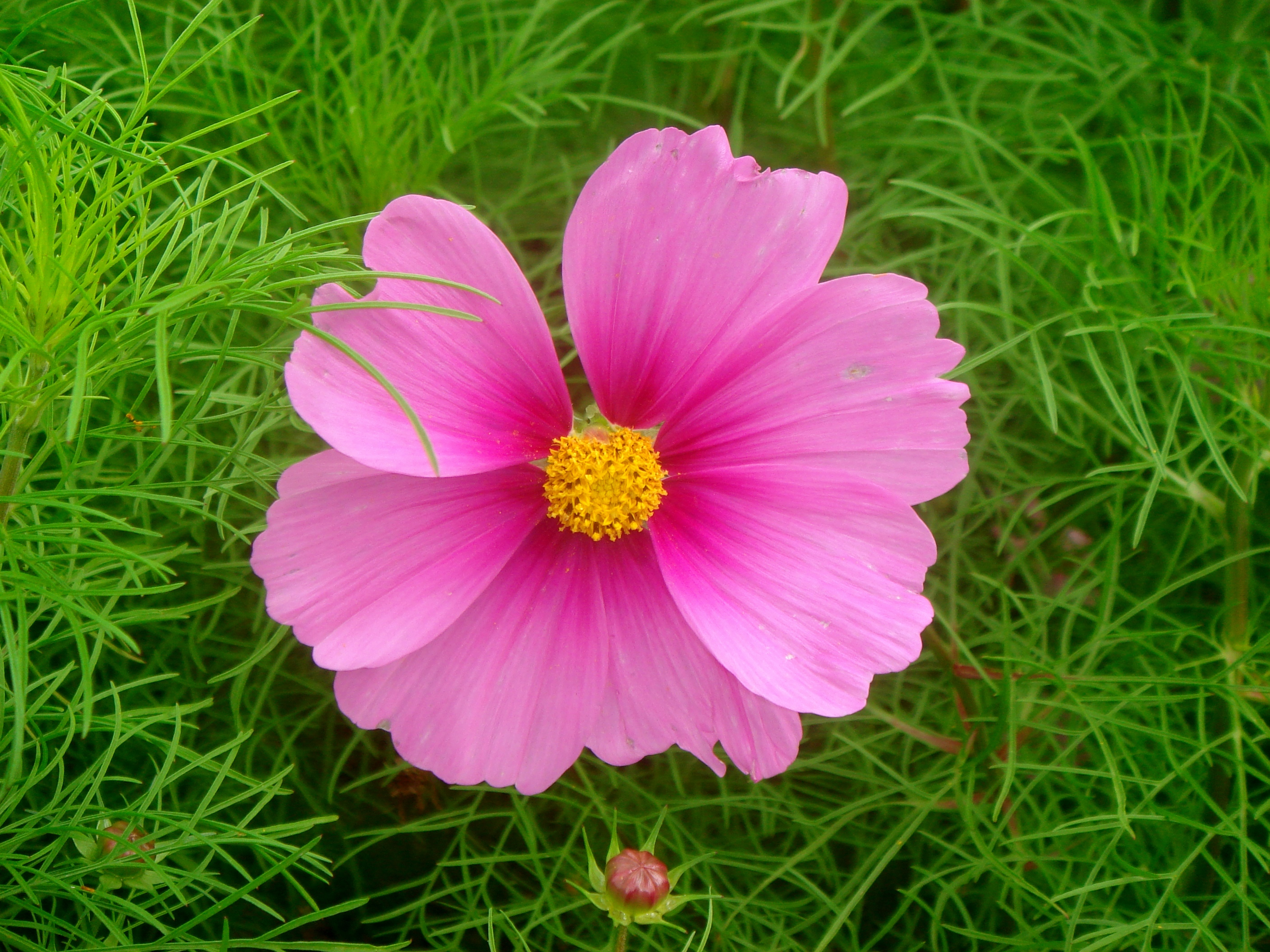

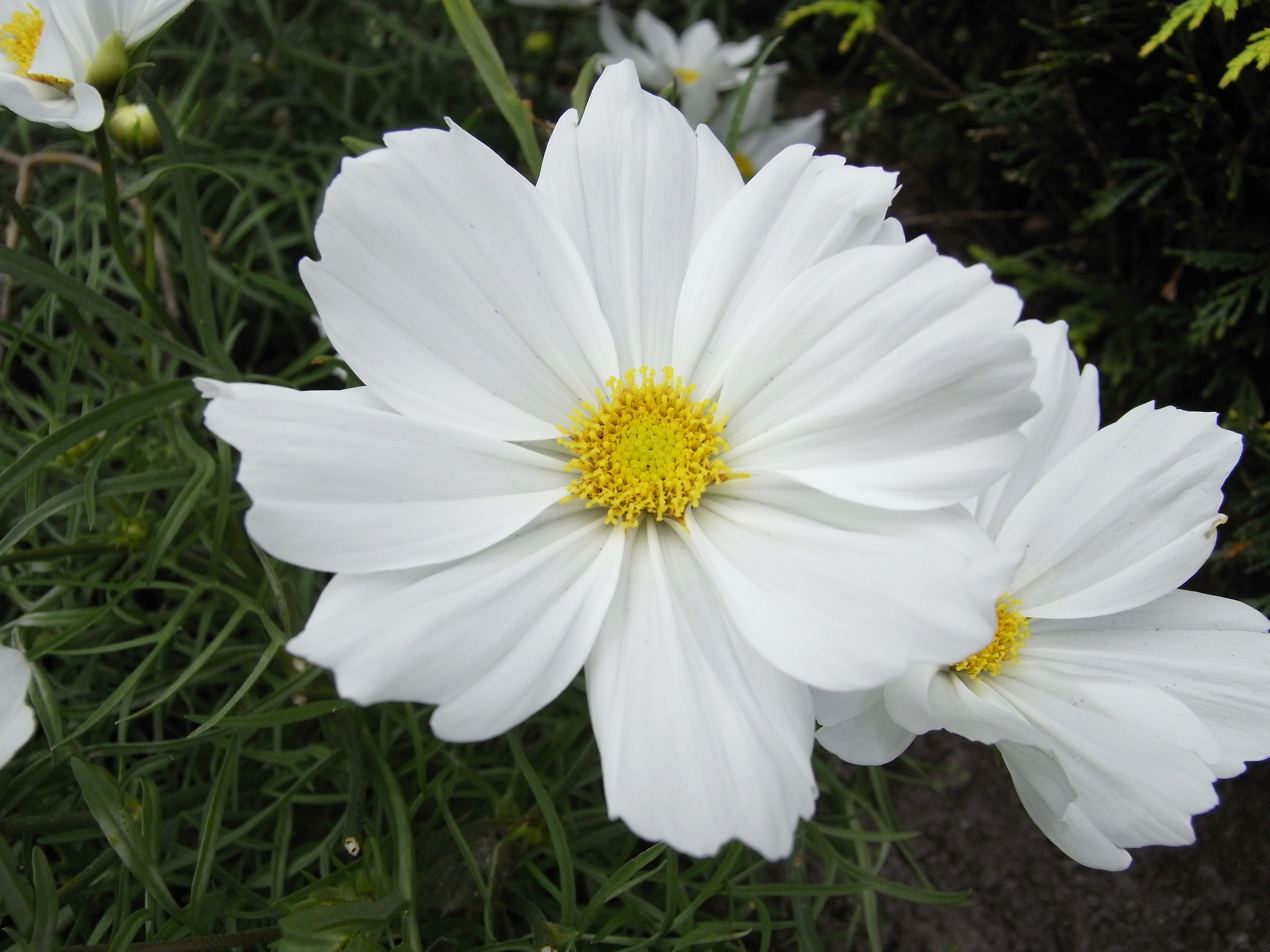

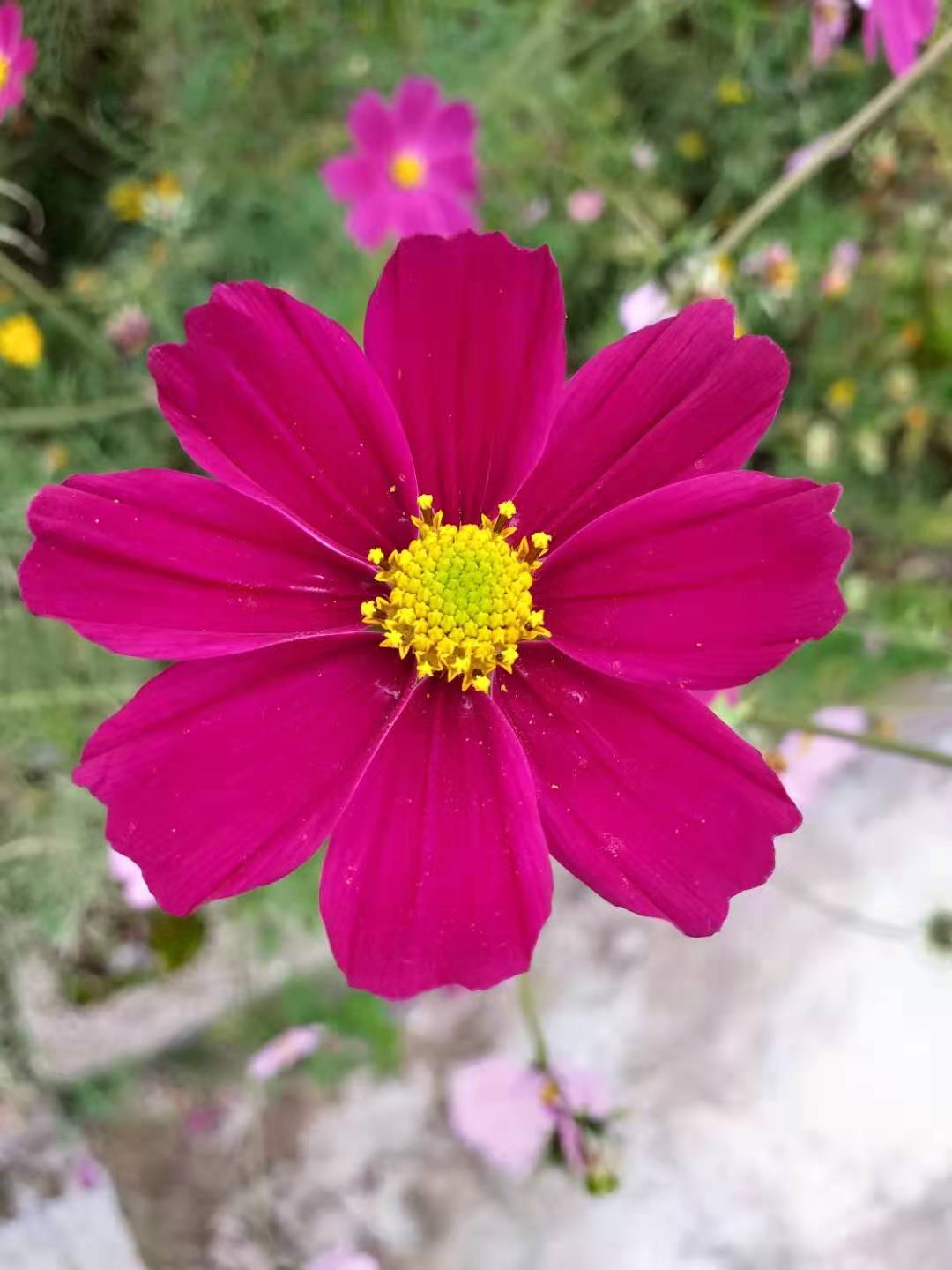

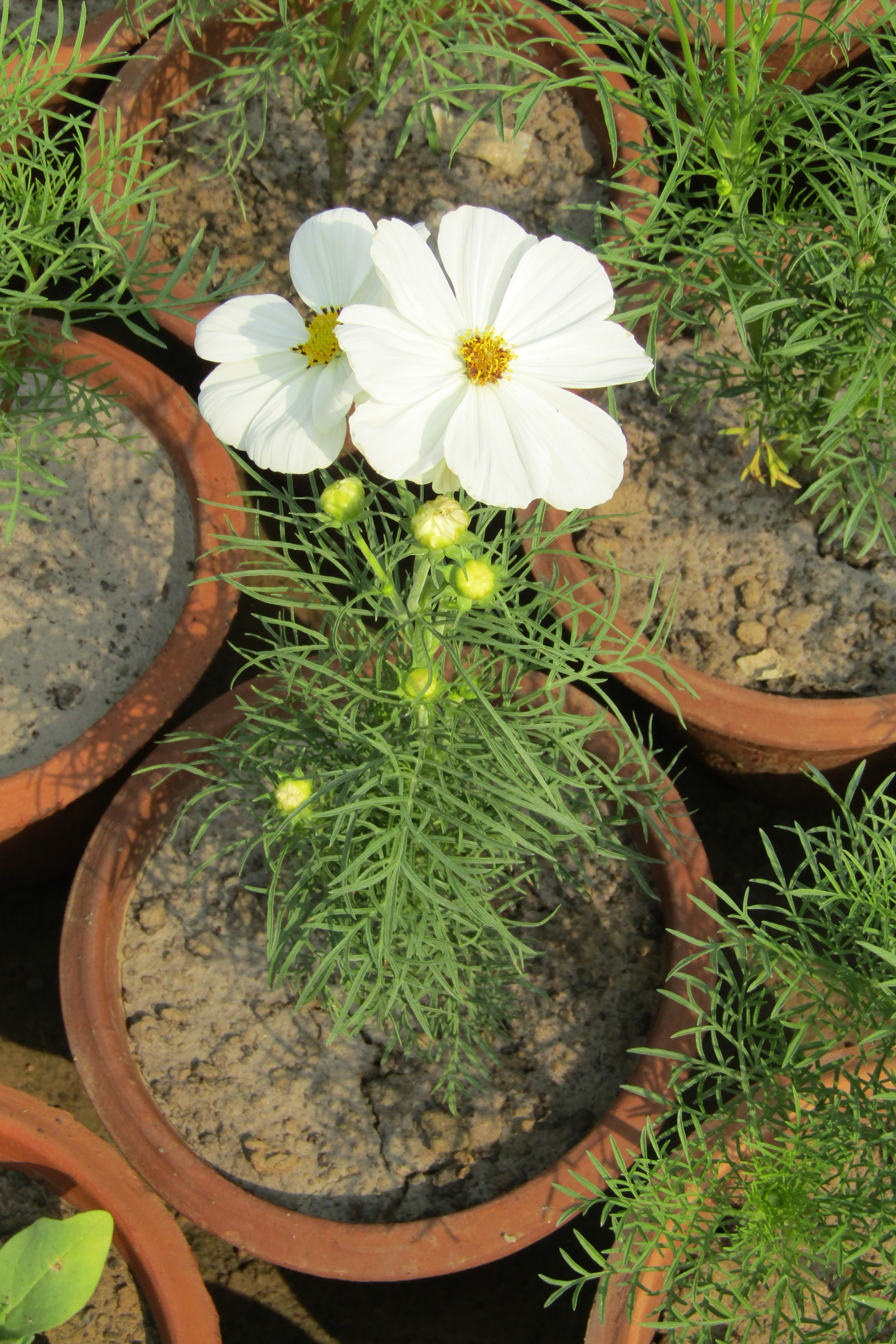
