= Eriocapitella rupicola =

Scientific classification
- Kingdom: Plantae
- Clade: Tracheophytes
- Clade: Angiosperms
- Clade: Eudicots
- Order: Ranunculales
- Family: Ranunculaceae
- Genus: Eriocapitella
- Species: E. rupicola

Binomial name
- Eriocapitella rupicola (Cambess.) Christenh. & Byng

Synonyms
- List: Anemone batangensis Finet; Anemone rupestris Jacquem. ex Cambess.; Anemone rupicola Cambess.; Anemone rupicola subsp. reniformis R.P.Chaudhary; Anemone rupicola subsp. sericea (Hook.f. & Thomson) R.P.Chaudhary

Species of flowering plant in buttercup family

Eriocapitella rupicola, a species of flowering plant in the buttercup family Ranunculaceae, is native to Asia. The specific epithet rupicola means "growing on rocks". In Chinese, the plant is called yánshēng yínliánhuā (岩生銀蓮花), which means "rock anemone".

== Taxonomy ==
Eriocapitella rupicola was described by Maarten J. M. Christenhusz and James W. Byng in 2018. Like other members of genus Eriocapitella, E. rupicola was formerly a member of genus Anemone. The basionym Anemone rupicola Cambess. was described in 1844.

== Cultivation ==
The cultivar Eriocapitella rupicola 'Wild Swan' won the Plant of the Year Award at the Chelsea Flower Show in 2011. It is said to be a cross between E. rupicola and E. hupehensis.

== Bibliography ==
- Gledhill, David (2008). The Names of Plants (4th ed.). Cambridge University Press. ISBN 978-0-521-86645-3.
