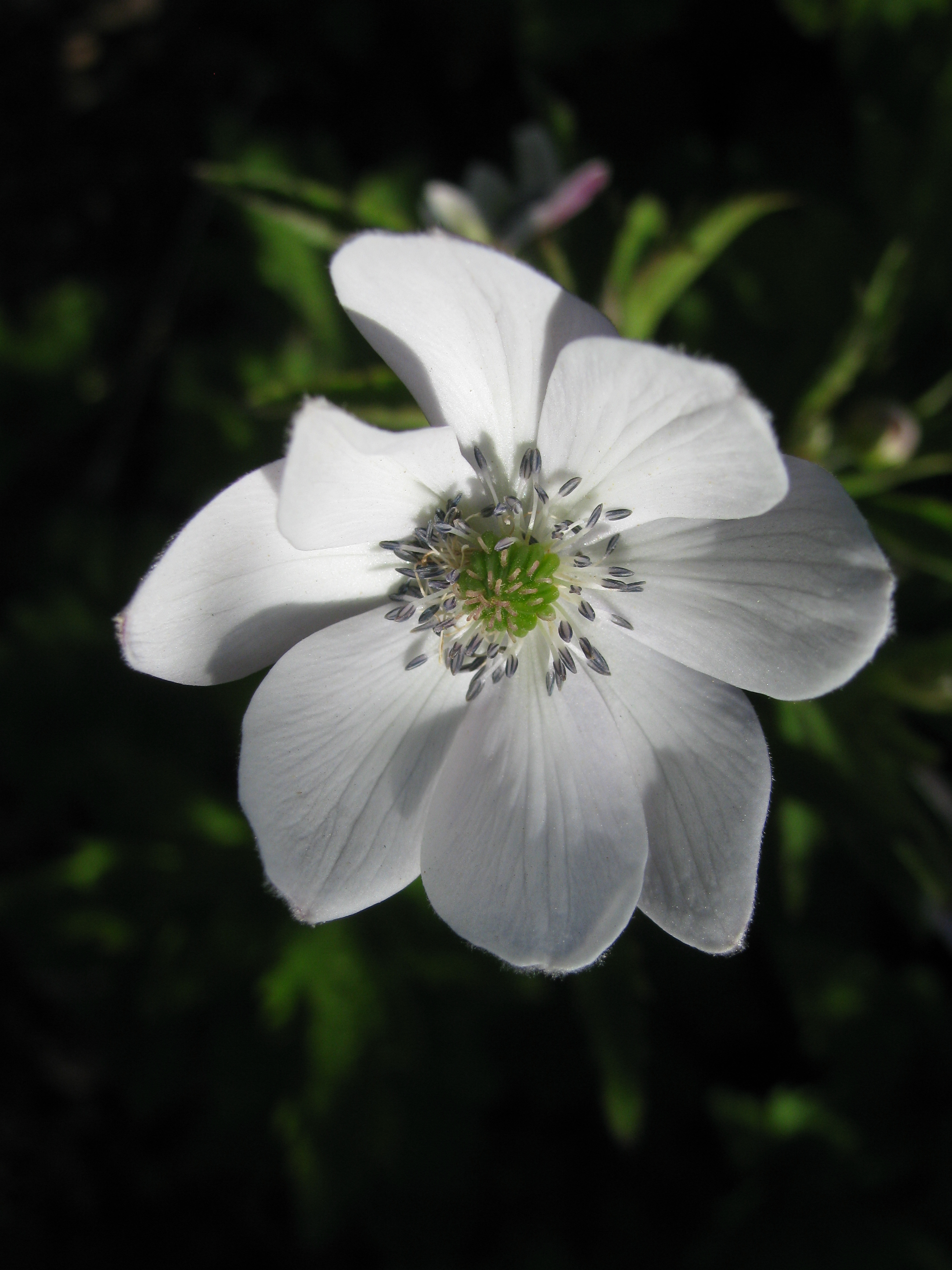
- At the Royal Botanic Garden Edinburgh (20 June 2010)

Scientific classification
- Kingdom: Plantae
- Clade: Tracheophytes
- Clade: Angiosperms
- Clade: Eudicots
- Order: Ranunculales
- Family: Ranunculaceae
- Genus: Eriocapitella
- Species: E. rivularis

Binomial name
- Eriocapitella rivularis (Buch.-Ham. ex DC.) Christenh. & Byng

Synonyms
- List: Anemone barbulata Turcz.; Anemone geraniifolia Wall.; Anemone hispida Wall.; Anemone leveillei Ulbr.; Anemone longipes Tamura; Anemone rivularis Buch.-Ham. ex DC.; Anemone rivularis var. barbulata (Turcz.) B.Fedtsch.; Anemone rivularis var. daliensis X.D.Dong & Lin Yang; Anemone rivularis var. flore-minore Maxim.; Anemone rivularis var. pilosisepala W.T.Wang; Anemone saniculifolia H.Lév.; Anemonidium rivulare (Buch.-Ham. ex DC.) Starod.; Ranunculus moellendorffii Hance

= Eriocapitella rivularis =

Species of flowering plant

Eriocapitella rivularis, a species of flowering plant in the buttercup family Ranunculaceae, is native to Asia. The specific epithet rivularis means "waterside, of the rivers", which evidently refers to one of its preferred habitats. It is commonly called the riverside windflower. In Chinese, it is called cǎoyùméi (草玉梅), literally "grass jade plum".

== Description ==
Eriocapitella rivularis is a perennial herbaceous plant with a rhizome-like root structure. It is a clump-forming plant with 3–5 basal leaves, each with a petiole 5 to 15 cm (2 to 6 in) long, occasionally up to 25 cm (10 in) long. The leaf blades are lobed with three sections. Each leaf, being wider than it is long, has the overall shape of a pentagon. In addition to the basal leaves, there are 1–3 flowering stems, each 20 to 60 cm (8 to 24 in) long, occasionally up to 120 cm (47 in) long. A whorl of 3 or 4 leaves (technically bracts) wraps around each stem. The stem leaves are similar in appearance to the basal leaves but somewhat smaller. Multiple (3–5) pubescent flower stalks rise directly from the stem leaves, each stalk being 2 to 12 cm (0.8 to 4.7 in) long. The single flower at the end of each stalk has 5–10 sepals, but no petals. Each sepal is 6 to 15 mm (0.2 to 0.6 in) long and 3 to 10 mm (0.1 to 0.4 in) wide. The petal-like sepals are usually white, tinged with blue on the reverse. There are 30–60 pistils in the center of the flower, surrounded by stamens 3 to 5 mm (0.1 to 0.2 in) long, tipped with steel-blue anthers. The fruits are beaked achenes 5–8 mm (0.2–0.3 in) long, ovoid in shape with hooked styles.

In its native habitat, E. rivularis flowers from May to August. Each flower is approximately 2.5 cm (1 in) in diameter.

== Taxonomy ==
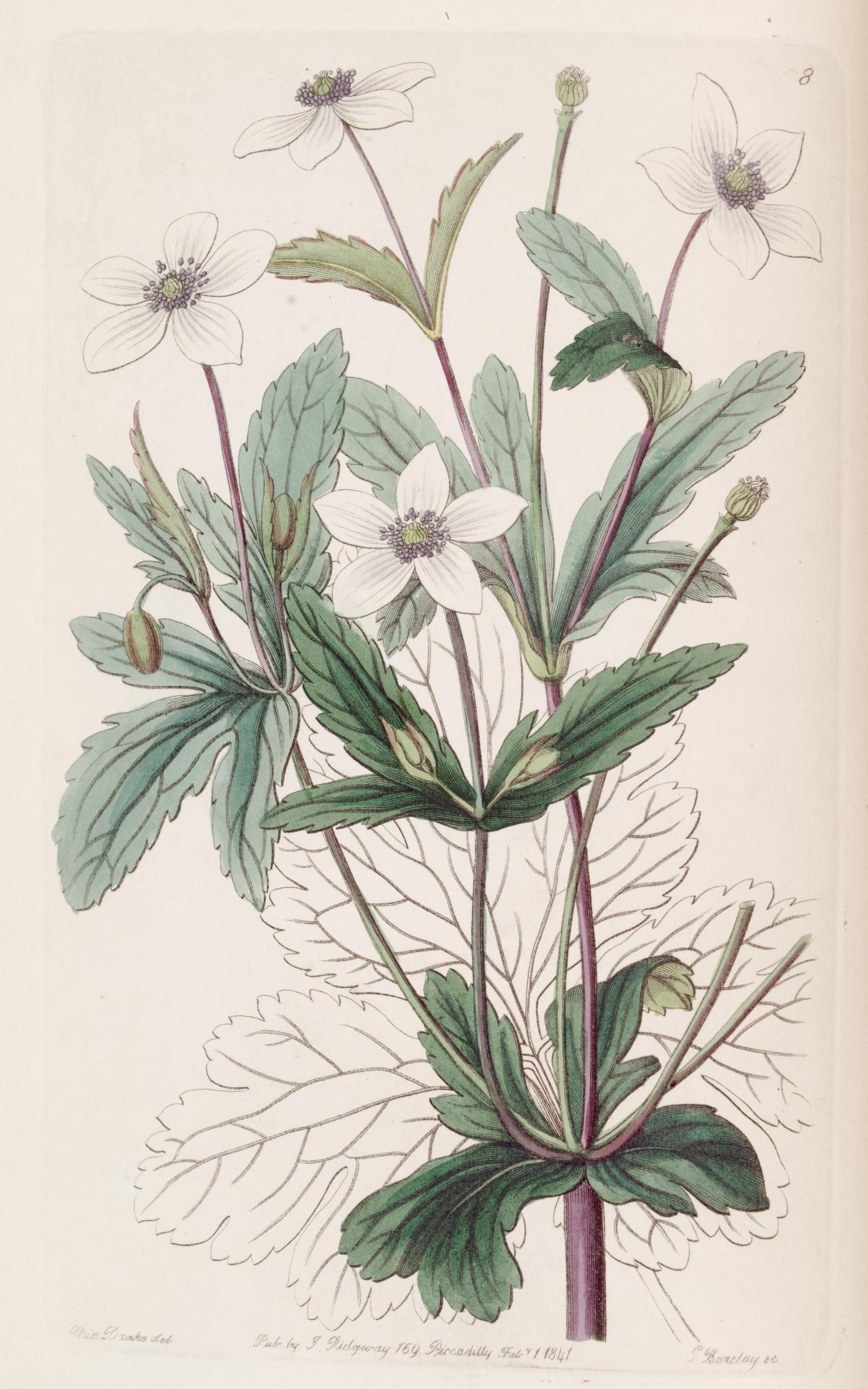
Illustration made in 1842

Eriocapitella rivularis was described by Maarten J. M. Christenhusz and James W. Byng in 2018. Like other members of genus Eriocapitella, E. rivularis was formerly a member of genus Anemone. The basionym Anemone rivularis Buch.-Ham. ex DC. was described in 1817.

== Distribution ==
Eriocapitella rivularis is native to Asia. It is found throughout the Himalaya region, across much of South Asia, East Asia, and Southeast Asia, ranging as far south as Sumatra in western Indonesia.

- Western Himalaya: North India
- Eastern Himalaya: Nepal, Assam (in northeast India), Tibet Autonomous Region
- South Asia: India, Sri Lanka
- East Asia: China
  - Northwest China: Gansu, Ningxia, Qinghai, Shaanxi, Xinjiang, Qinghai
  - North China: Hebei, Inner Mongolia
  - Central China: Henan, Hubei
  - South China: Guangxi
  - Southwest China: Guizhou, Yunnan
- Southeast Asia: Laos, Myanmar, Vietnam

Its preferred habitats include meadows, forest margins, paddy fields, streamsides, and lakesides. It is also found under alpine brush in the Himalayas at elevations up to 4,900 metres (16,100 ft).

== Bibliography ==
- Gledhill, David (2008). The Names of Plants (4th ed.). Cambridge University Press. ISBN 978-0-521-86645-3.
