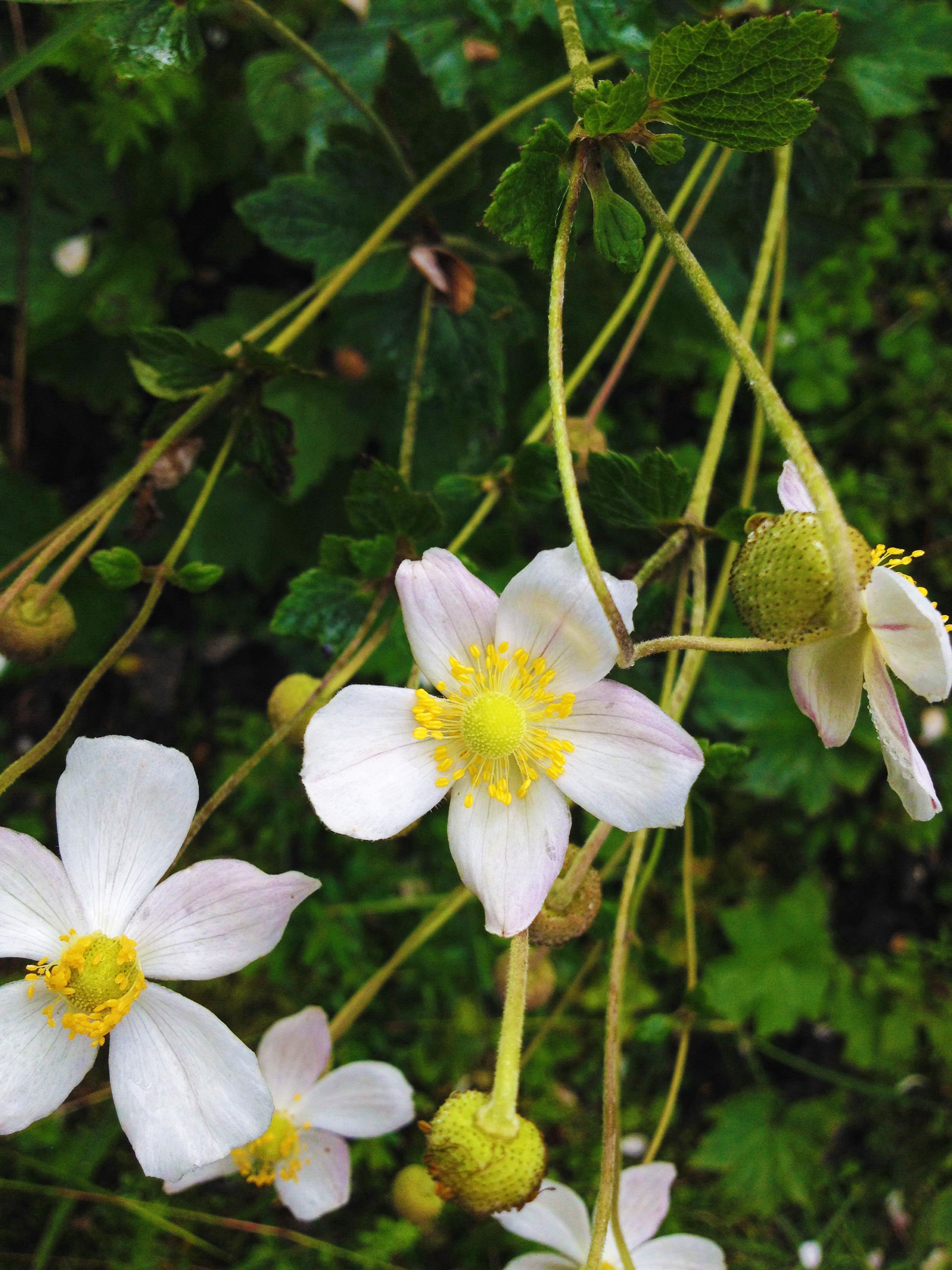

Scientific classification
- Kingdom: Plantae
- Clade: Embryophytes
- Clade: Tracheophytes
- Clade: Spermatophytes
- Clade: Angiosperms
- Clade: Eudicots
- Order: Ranunculales
- Family: Ranunculaceae
- Genus: Eriocapitella
- Species: E. vitifolia

Binomial name
- Eriocapitella vitifolia (Buch.-Ham. ex DC.) Nakai

Synonyms
- List: Anemone elegans Decne.; Anemone vitifolia Buch.-Ham. ex DC.; Eriocapitella elegans (Decne.) Nakai

= Eriocapitella vitifolia =

Species of flowering plant

Eriocapitella vitifolia, a species of flowering plant in the buttercup family Ranunculaceae, is native to Asia. The specific epithet vitifolia means "vine-leaved, with leaves resembling those of Vitis", the genus of grapevines, and so the plant is commonly called the grape-leaved anemone or grape-leaved windflower. In Chinese, a common name is ye mian hua, which means "wild cotton".

== Taxonomy ==
Eriocapitella vitifolia was described by Takenoshin Nakai in 1941. Like other members of genus Eriocapitella, E. vitifolia was formerly a member of genus Anemone. The basionym Anemone vitifolia Buch.-Ham. ex DC. was described in 1817.

Along with E. japonica, E. vitifolia is a parent of the hybrid E. × hybrida.

== Ecology ==
Eriocapitella vitifolia along with four other taxa (E. hupehensis, E. japonica, E. tomentosa, and E. × hybrida) are known as fall-blooming anemones. In its native habitat, E. vitifolia flowers from July to October.

== Bibliography ==
- Gledhill, David (2008). The Names of Plants (4th ed.). Cambridge University Press. ISBN 978-0-521-86645-3.
- Rudy, Mark R. (2004). "Fall-blooming Anemones" (PDF). Plant Evaluation Notes, Issue 25. Chicago Botanic Garden.
