= Eriocapitella × hybrida =

Scientific classification
- Kingdom: Plantae
- Clade: Embryophytes
- Clade: Tracheophytes
- Clade: Angiosperms
- Clade: Eudicots
- Order: Ranunculales
- Family: Ranunculaceae
- Genus: Eriocapitella
- Species: E. × hybrida

Binomial name
- Eriocapitella × hybrida (L.H.Bailey) Christenh. & Byng

Synonyms
- List: Anemone × hybrida (L.H.Bailey) Makino; Anemone japonica var. hybrida L.H.Bailey

Hybrid of flowering plant

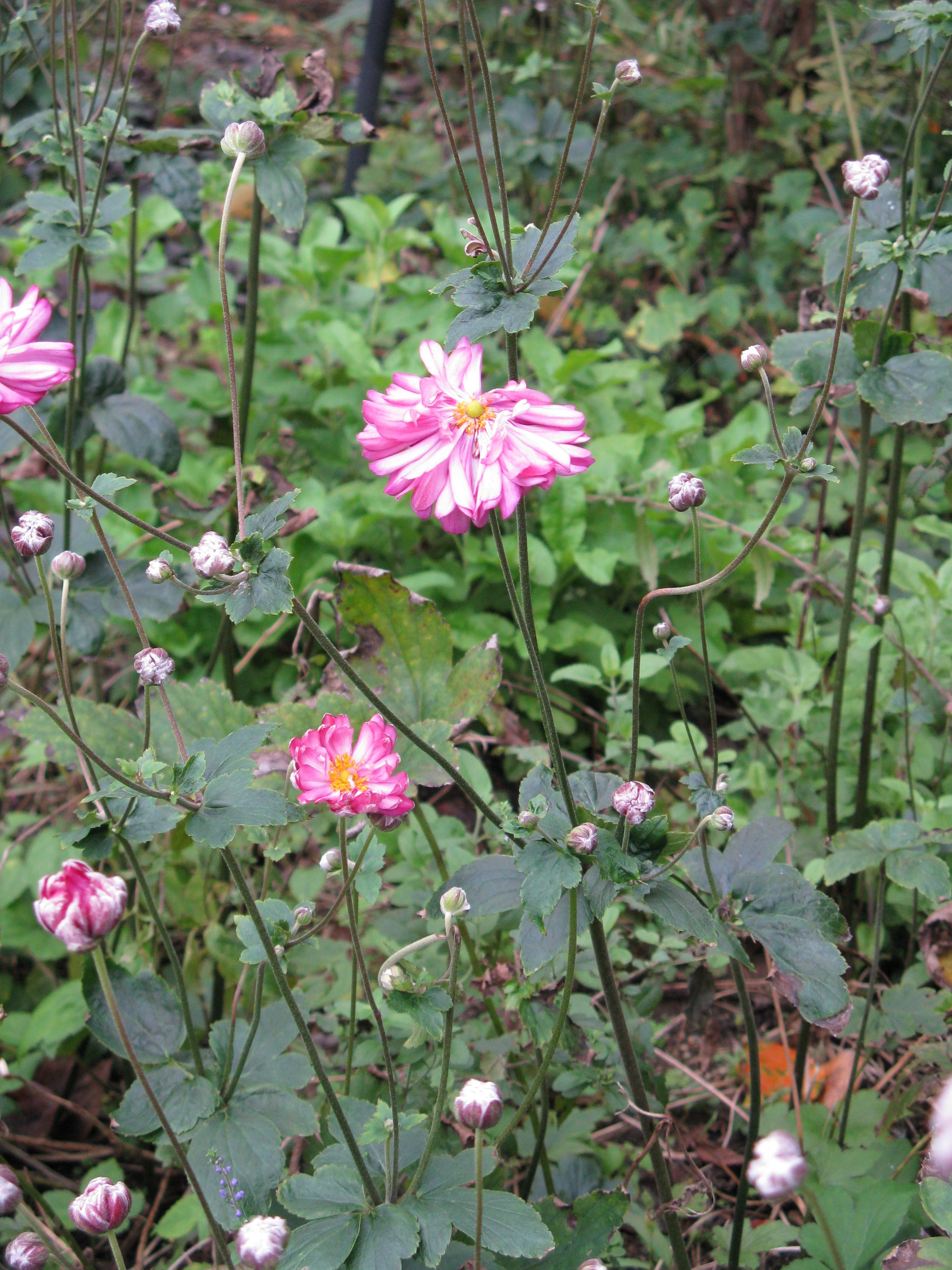

Eriocapitella × hybrida is a hybrid of flowering plant in the buttercup family Ranunculaceae. The parents of the hybrid are E. japonica and E. vitifolia. Cultivars of the hybrid are commonly known as Japanese anemone hybrids.

== Description ==
Eriocapitella × hybrida is a perennial herbaceous plant up to 1.5 m (4.9 ft) tall. It forms large clumps of dark green, ternate, basal leaves on long petioles (leaf stalks). The pubescent leaflets are ovate, with deep lobes and serrate margins (edges). The inflorescence is a large, loose cyme with semi-double flowers. The flower is approximately 8 cm (3.1 in) across with 7–11 white, pink, or rose sepals (no petals) each having a silky sheen on the backside. The center of the flower is surrounded by prominent golden stamens.

== Taxonomy ==
Eriocapitella × hybrida was described by Maarten J. M. Christenhusz and James W. Byng in 2018. Like other members of genus Eriocapitella, E. × hybrida was formerly a member of genus Anemone. In particular, the historically important synonym Anemone × hybrida Paxton and the basionym Anemone japonica var. hybrida L.H.Bailey were described in 1848 and 1914, respectively.

== Ecology ==
Eriocapitella × hybrida along with four other taxa (E. hupehensis, E. japonica, E. tomentosa, and E. vitifolia) are known as fall-blooming anemones. The bloom period depends on the particular cultivar and location, but at Longwood Gardens for example, E. × hybrida 'Königin Charlotte' bloomed from mid September to early November.

== Cultivation ==
The artificial hybrid Eriocapitella × hybrida was developed at the gardens of the Royal Horticultural Society in 1848. As reported by Joseph Paxton at the time, gardeners crossed the so-called Japanese anemone E. japonica with E. vitifolia to produce a hardy fall-blooming hybrid with rose-colored flowers. The parent species were previously brought to England from their native Asia: E. vitifolia was brought from Nepal in 1829 while E. japonica was brought from China in 1844. European horticulturalists in Great Britain, Germany, and France subsequently introduced dozens of cultivars. Commonly called Japanese anemone hybrids, the cultivars of E. × hybrida have single, semi-double, or double flowers with white, pink, or purple sepals.

At the Chicago Botanic Garden, Rudy experimented with 26 cultivars of fall-blooming anemones over a 5-year period beginning in 1998. His experiments included 18 cultivars of E. × hybrida, of which more than half had a bloom length greater than 48 days.

Cultivar	Flower color	Flower form	Height	Width	Bloom period	Bloom length
E. × hybrida 'Alba'	white	single			mid Sep-late Oct	24.0 days
E. × hybrida 'Alice'	pale pink	semi-double	32 in.	37 in.	mid Sep-early Nov	53.5 days
E. × hybrida 'Andrea Atkinson'	white	single to semi-double	35 in.	20 in.	late Aug-mid Nov	64.7 days
E. × hybrida 'Avalanche'	white	double			mid Aug-late Oct	37.0 days
E. × hybrida 'Honorine Jobert'	white	single to semi-double	40 in.	33 in.	mid Sep-mid Nov	45.8 days
E. × hybrida 'Königin Charlotte'	pale pink	semi-double	36 in.	31 in.	late Sep-early Nov	25.4 days
E. × hybrida 'Kriemhilde'	pink	single to semi-double	30 in.	19 in.	late Aug-early Nov	56.0 days
E. × hybrida 'Lady Gilmour'	pale pink	single			late Sep-late Oct	16.0 days
E. × hybrida 'Loreley'	pink	semi-double				0.0 days
E. × hybrida 'Margarete'	deep pink	semi-double	22 in.	30 in.	late Aug-early Nov	49.3 days
E. × hybrida 'Max Vogel'	pink	semi-double	43 in.	35 in.	mid Aug-early Nov	62.5 days
E. × hybrida 'Montrose'	pale purple	double	27 in.	30 in.	mid Sep-early Nov	43.5 days
E. × hybrida 'Richard Ahrens'	pink	single to semi-double	27 in.	31 in.	mid Sep-late Oct	48.7 days
E. × hybrida 'Robustissima'	pink	single	41 in.	40 in.	late Aug-mid Nov	63.0 days
E. × hybrida 'September Charm'	pale purple	single	30 in.	20 in.	late Aug-early Nov	48.2 days
E. × hybrida 'Serenade'	pink	semi-double	23 in.	40 in.	mid Aug-late Oct	64.5 days
E. × hybrida 'Victor Jones'	pale pink	single	31 in.	35 in.	late Aug-mid Oct	53.4 days
E. × hybrida 'Whirlwind'	white	semi-double	27 in.	35 in.	early Sep-early Nov	41.1 days

As of March 2020, the following cultivars of E. × hybrida have gained the Award of Garden Merit (AGM) from the Royal Horticultural Society:

- E. × hybrida 'Elegans', also known as E. × hybrida 'Max Vogel'
- E. × hybrida 'Honorine Jobert'
- E. × hybrida 'Königin Charlotte' ('Queen Charlotte')
- E. × hybrida 'September Charm'

The cultivars E. × hybrida 'Andrea Atkinson', E. × hybrida 'Lady Gilmour', and E. × hybrida 'Robustissima' were removed from the AGM list in 2013.

== Bibliography ==
- Gledhill, David (2008). The Names of Plants (4th ed.). Cambridge University Press. ISBN 978-0-521-86645-3.
- Herman, Robert (2004). "Fall-blooming anemones". Fine Gardening. 99: 48–52.
- Rudy, Mark R. (2004). "Fall-blooming Anemones" (PDF). Plant Evaluation Notes, Issue 25. Chicago Botanic Garden.
