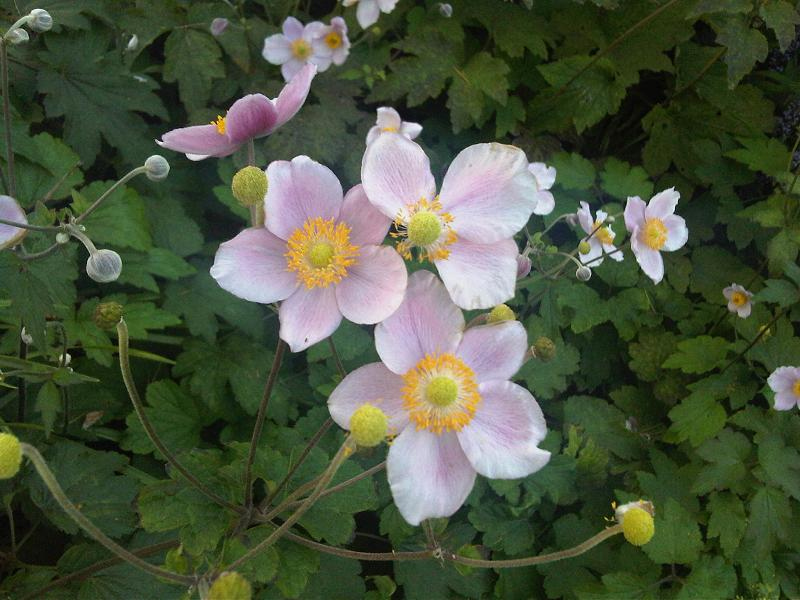

Scientific classification
- Kingdom: Plantae
- Clade: Embryophytes
- Clade: Tracheophytes
- Clade: Angiosperms
- Clade: Eudicots
- Order: Ranunculales
- Family: Ranunculaceae
- Genus: Eriocapitella
- Species: E. tomentosa

Binomial name
- Eriocapitella tomentosa (Maxim.) Christenh. & Byng

Synonyms
- List: Anemone japonica var. tomentosa Maxim.; Anemone tomentosa (Maxim.) C.Pei

= Eriocapitella tomentosa =

Species of flowering plant

Eriocapitella tomentosa, a species of flowering plant in the buttercup family Ranunculaceae, is native to Asia. The specific epithet tomentosa means "thickly matted with hairs, tomentum (padding)". It was formerly a member of genus Anemone and shares the common name Japanese anemone with several other Eriocapitella species. In Chinese, a common name is dàhuǒcǎo (大火草), which literally means "big fire grass" or "great fireweed".

== Taxonomy ==
Eriocapitella tomentosa was described by Maarten J. M. Christenhusz and James W. Byng in 2018. Like other members of genus Eriocapitella, E. tomentosa was formerly a member of genus Anemone. In particular, the basionym Anemone japonica var. tomentosa Maxim. and the synonym Anemone tomentosa (Maxim.) C.Pei were described in 1889 and 1933, respectively.

Eriocapitella tomentosa is often confused with E. vitifolia. Indeed, the former was thought to be a variety of the latter for over 100 years. Specifically, the names Anemone vitifolia var. tomentosa (Maxim.) Finet & Gagnep. and Eriocapitella vitifolia var. tomentosa (Maxim.) Nakai, both of which are synonyms of Anemone tomentosa, were described in 1904 and 1941, respectively.

== Ecology ==
Eriocapitella tomentosa along with four other taxa (E. hupehensis, E. japonica, E. vitifolia, and E. × hybrida) are known as fall-blooming anemones. In its native habitat, E. tomentosa flowers from July to October.

== Bibliography ==
- Gledhill, David (2008). The Names of Plants (4th ed.). Cambridge University Press. ISBN 978-0-521-86645-3.
- Rudy, Mark R. (2004). "Fall-blooming Anemones" (PDF). Plant Evaluation Notes, Issue 25. Chicago Botanic Garden.
