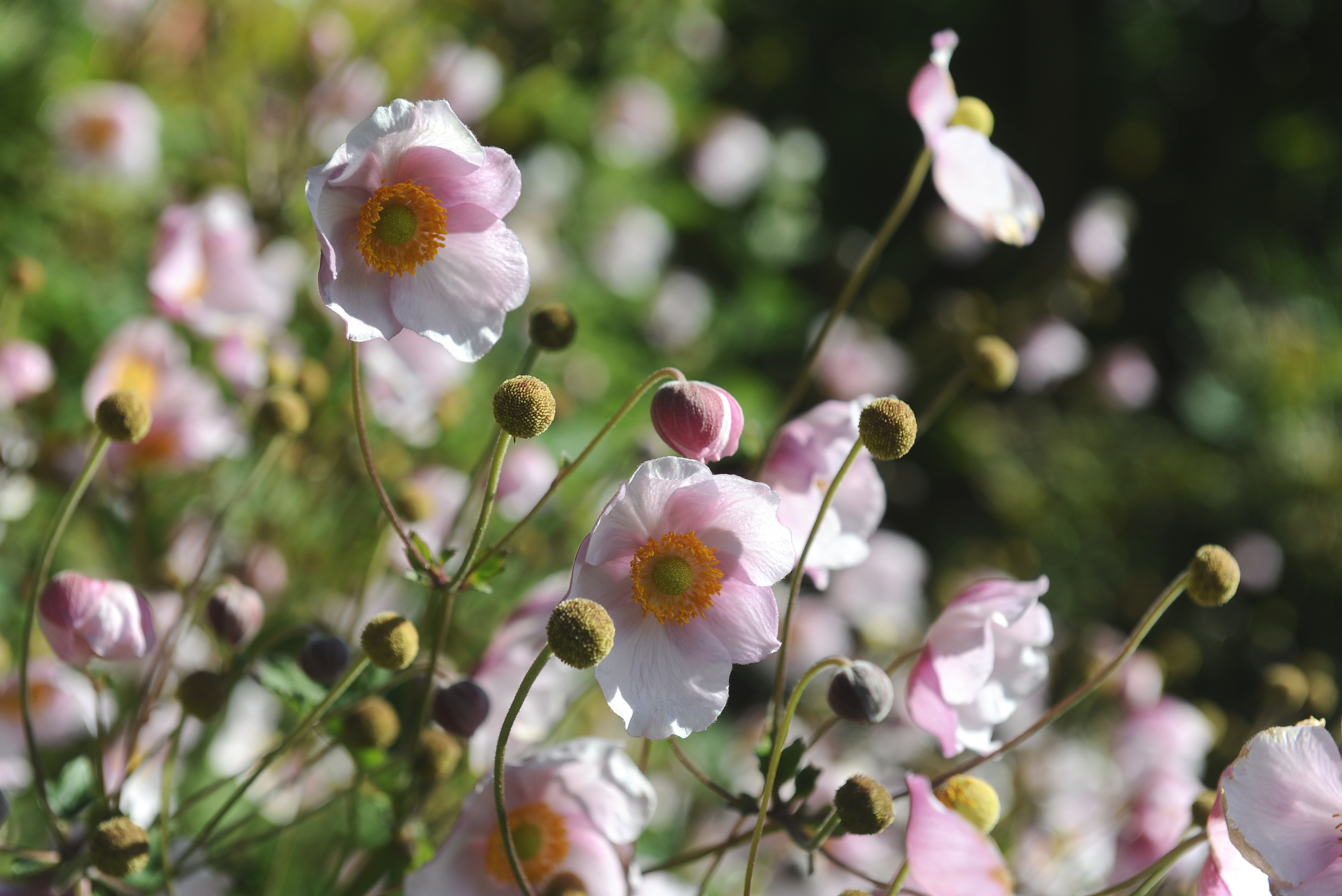

Scientific classification
- Kingdom: Plantae
- Clade: Embryophytes
- Clade: Tracheophytes
- Clade: Spermatophytes
- Clade: Angiosperms
- Clade: Eudicots
- Order: Ranunculales
- Family: Ranunculaceae
- Genus: Eriocapitella
- Species: E. japonica

Binomial name
- Eriocapitella japonica (Thunb.) Nakai

Synonyms
- List: Anemone hupehensis var. japonica (Thunb.) Bowles & Stearn; Anemone hupehensis var. simplicifolia W.T.Wang; Anemone japonica (Thunb.) Siebold & Zucc.; Anemone nipponica Merr.; Anemone scabiosa H.Lév. & Vaniot; Atragene japonica Thunb.; Atragene polypetala Thunb.; Clematis polypetala DC.

= Eriocapitella japonica =

Species of flowering plant

Eriocapitella japonica is a species of flowering plant in the buttercup family Ranunculaceae commonly cultivated as an ornamental. The specific epithet japonica means "from Japan", which is a misnomer since the species is introduced in Japan. It is native to China, Taiwan, and Vietnam. It was formerly a member of genus Anemone and shares the common name Japanese anemone with several other Eriocapitella species.

== Description ==
Eriocapitella japonica is a perennial herbaceous plant that stands 60 to 90 cm (2 to 3 ft) high. Plant parts are soft and downy, with short hairs. The basal leaves are ternate, lobed, and toothed. The inflorescence is a cyme with flower stalks rising from a whorl of leaves wrapped around the top of the stem. Each flower is approximately 5 to 7.5 cm (2.0 to 3.0 in) across, with 1–3 whorls of sepals (but no petals) and yellow stamens. The sepals are rosy purple or carmine in color. The fruits are silky achenes.

== Taxonomy ==
Eriocapitella japonica was described by Takenoshin Nakai in 1941. Like other members of genus Eriocapitella, E. japonica was formerly a member of genus Anemone. The historically important synonym Anemone hupehensis var. japonica (Thunb.) Bowles & Stearn was described in 1947.

E. japonica has the longest taxonomic history of any member of genus Eriocapitella. The basionym Atragene japonica Thunb. was described by Carl Thunberg in 1784. Thunberg, one of the Apostles of Linnaeus, had collected dried specimens while working as a doctor for the Dutch East Indies Company.

E. japonica was previously known as Anemone japonica (Thunb.) Siebold & Zucc. The latter had at least three named varieties: A. j. var. hupehensis, A. j. var. hybrida, and A. j. var. tomentosa, now known as E. hupehensis, E. × hybrida, and E. tomentosa, respectively. Along with E. vitifolia, E. japonica is a parent of the hybrid E. × hybrida.

== Distribution ==
Eriocapitella japonica is native to Central China, East China, South China, Taiwan, and Vietnam. It has been cultivated and naturalized in the following Chinese provinces:

- East China: Anhui, Jiangsu, Jiangxi, Zhejiang, Fujian
- South China: Guangdong
- Southwest China: Yunnan

E. japonica was introduced to Japan and Korea. It has been naturalized in Japan for hundreds of years.

== Ecology ==
Eriocapitella japonica along with four other taxa (E. hupehensis, E. vitifolia, E. tomentosa, and E. × hybrida) are known as fall-blooming anemones. Like E. hupehensis, E. japonica flowers from July to October in its native habitat.

== Cultivation ==
Varieties of Eriocapitella japonica are cultivated worldwide, especially in China, Japan, and Korea, where naturalized populations are known to exist. Hundreds of years ago, a form of E. hupehensis with smaller, semi-double flowers and pink sepals escaped cultivation and spread across China to Japan and Korea. After finding this form in a Shanghai graveyard in 1843, the plant explorer Robert Fortune sent it home to England where it became known as E. japonica, the Japanese anemone. European horticulturists crossed the Japanese anemone with E. vitifolia to produce cultivars of the artificial hybrid E. × hybrida.

At the Chicago Botanic Garden, Rudy experimented with 26 cultivars of fall-blooming anemones over a 5-year period beginning in 1998. His experiments included 4 cultivars of E. japonica, one of which (E. japonica 'Prinz Heinrich') had the longest bloom length (65 days) of any cultivar.

Cultivar	Flower color	Flower form	Height	Width	Bloom period	Bloom length
E. japonica 'Bressingham Glow'	deep pink	semi-double to double	20 in.	32 in.	early Sep-early Nov	54.2 days
E. japonica 'Pamina'	deep pink	semi-double to double	30 in.	28 in.	late Aug-late Oct	46.8 days
E. japonica 'Prinz Heinrich'	rose pink	semi-double to double	28 in.	31 in.	early Sep-early Nov	64.8 days
E. japonica 'Splendens'	rose pink	single to semi-double	25 in.	34 in.	late Aug-early Nov	61.2 days

As of March 2020, the following cultivars have gained the Award of Garden Merit (AGM) from the Royal Horticultural Society:

- E. japonica 'Pamina'
- E. japonica 'Rotkäppchen'

The cultivar E. japonica 'Prinz Heinrich' was removed from the AGM list in 2013.

== Bibliography ==
- Gledhill, David (2008). The Names of Plants (4th ed.). Cambridge University Press. ISBN 978-0-521-86645-3.
- Herman, Robert (2004). "Fall-blooming anemones". Fine Gardening. 99: 48–52.
- Rudy, Mark R. (2004). "Fall-blooming Anemones" (PDF). Plant Evaluation Notes, Issue 25. Chicago Botanic Garden.
