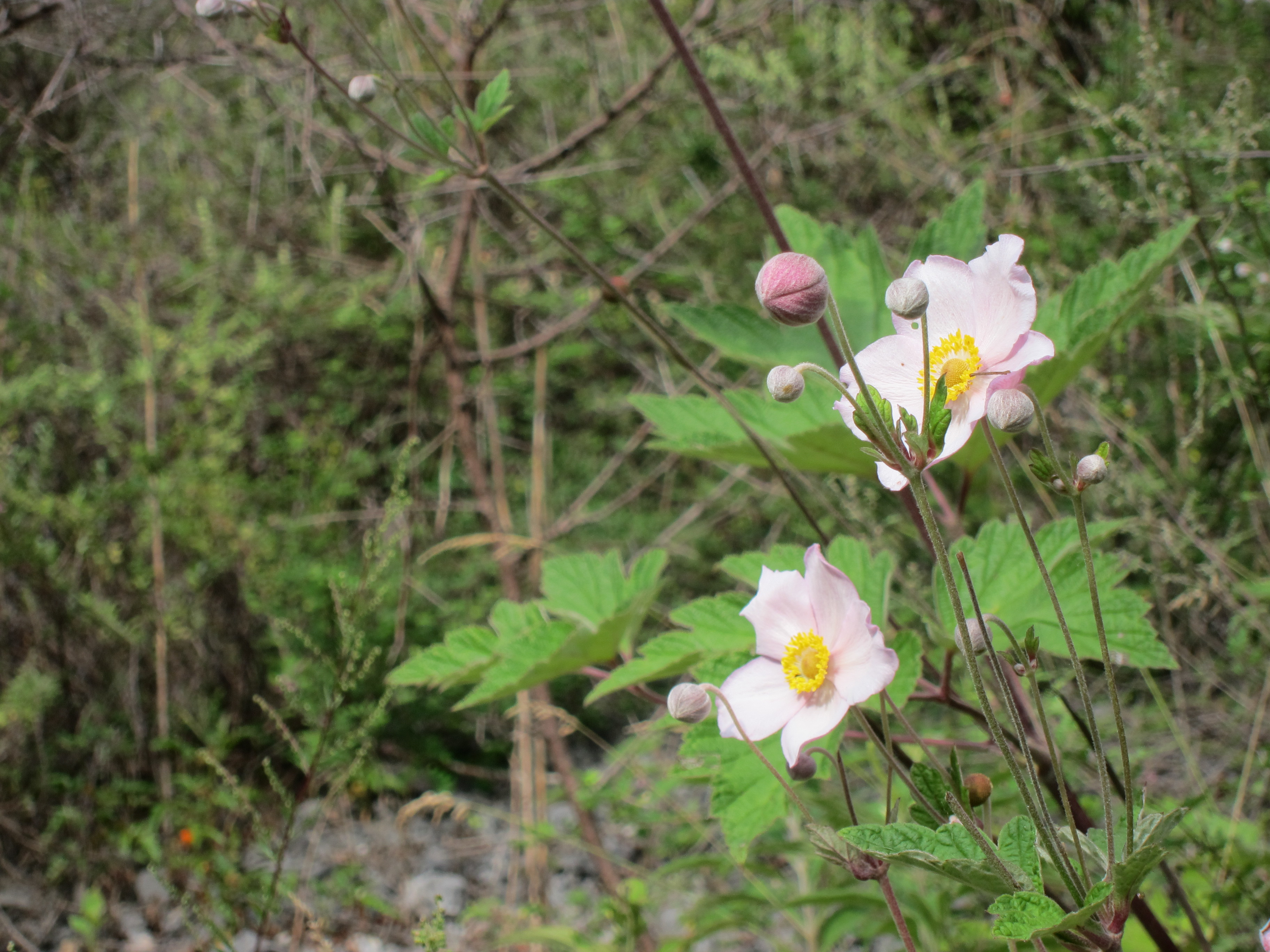
- Eriocapitella hupehensis (Sichuan, China)

Scientific classification
- Kingdom: Plantae
- Clade: Embryophytes
- Clade: Tracheophytes
- Clade: Spermatophytes
- Clade: Angiosperms
- Clade: Eudicots
- Order: Ranunculales
- Family: Ranunculaceae
- Subfamily: Ranunculoideae
- Tribe: Anemoneae
- Genus: Eriocapitella; Nakai

= Eriocapitella =

Genus of flowering plants in the buttercup family

Eriocapitella is a genus of flowering plants in the buttercup family Ranunculaceae. Plants of the genus are native to Asia. The generic name Eriocapitella roughly translates to "growing in a small woolly head", which refers to the hairy ovary and fruit of some members of the genus. Cultivated plants are commonly known as fall-blooming anemones.

== Taxonomy ==
Eriocapitella was named by the Japanese botanist Takenoshin Nakai in 1941. It was proposed as a section of genus Anemone in 1991, but later segregated into genus Eriocapitella.

=== Taxa ===
As of December 2020, Kew's Plants of the World Online (POWO) accepts 6 species in the genus Eriocapitella:

- Eriocapitella hupehensis (É.Lemoine) Christenh. & Byng
  - Basionym: Anemone japonica var. hupehensis Lemoine
- Eriocapitella japonica (Thunb.) Nakai
  - Basionym: Atragene japonica Thunb.
  - Synonym: Anemone hupehensis var. japonica (Thunb.) Bowles & Stearn
- Eriocapitella rivularis (Buch.-Ham. ex DC.) Christenh. & Byng
  - Basionym: Anemone rivularis Buch.-Ham. ex DC.
- Eriocapitella rupicola (Cambess.) Christenh. & Byng
  - Basionym: Anemone rupicola Cambess.
- Eriocapitella tomentosa (Maxim.) Christenh. & Byng
  - Basionym: Anemone japonica var. tomentosa Maxim.
  - Synonym: Anemone tomentosa (Maxim.) C.Pei
- Eriocapitella vitifolia (Buch.-Ham. ex DC.) Nakai
  - Basionym: Anemone vitifolia Buch.-Ham. ex DC.

An artificial hybrid is also recognized by POWO:

- Eriocapitella × hybrida (L.H.Bailey) Christenh. & Byng
  - Basionym: Anemone japonica var. hybrida L.H.Bailey
  - Synonym: Anemone × hybrida Paxton

The parents of the hybrid are E. japonica and E. vitifolia. Historically, the hybrid was developed in Europe after E. japonica was brought to England in 1843.

=== Etymology ===
The Latin word capitellatus (or capitellata) means "growing in a small head". Since the prefix erio- (from the Greek ἔριον) means "woolly" (or "wool"), the generic name Eriocapitella translates to "growing in a small woolly head". Presumably this refers to the hairy ovary and fruit of some of the taxa in the genus.

== Distribution ==
Plants of genus Eriocapitella are native to Asia. They are found throughout the Himalaya region, across much of East Asia and Southeast Asia, ranging as far south as Sumatra.

- Western Himalaya: Afghanistan, Pakistan, India
- Eastern Himalaya: Nepal, Assam (northeast India), Tibet, Qinghai (northwest China)
- East and Southeast Asia: China, Taiwan, Vietnam, Laos, Myanmar
- South Asia: Sri Lanka

Plants of the genus have been introduced to Czech Republic, Slovakia, Ecuador, Germany, Japan, Korea, and elsewhere.

== Cultivation ==
Plants of genus Eriocapitella have been cultivated since at least the 17th century, probably as far back as the Chinese Tang dynasty (618–907). During that time, a form of E. hupehensis with smaller, semi-double flowers and pink sepals escaped cultivation and spread across China to Japan and Korea. This form of E. hupehensis, brought to England from China by the plant explorer Robert Fortune in 1843, became known as the Japanese anemone (E. japonica). European horticulturists crossed the Japanese anemone with E. vitifolia, a wide-ranging Asian species with white sepals. Today there is a large number of Japanese anemone hybrids (E. × hybrida) with single, semi-double, or double flowers having white, pink, or purple sepals.

Fall-blooming anemones usually have white or pink blossoms with a globe-shaped seed head. Newly opened blossoms mingle with the seed heads for several weeks between late July and October. The plants thrive in light to partial shade but will tolerate full sun as long as there’s sufficient moisture. Overly wet conditions should be avoided, and mulch should be applied in the fall, especially in northern climates. Japanese beetles, black blister beetles, and foliar nematodes can be a problem.

At the Chicago Botanic Garden, Rudy experimented with 26 cultivars of fall-blooming anemones over a 5-year period beginning in 1998. The experiments evaluated various cultivars of E. hupehensis, E. × hybrida, E. japonica, and E. tomentosa. About 40% of the cultivars had a bloom length of 50 days or more. The longest bloom length recorded was 65 days.

Cultivar	Flower color	Flower form	Height	Width	Bloom period	Bloom length	Origin
E. hupehensis 'Hadspen Abundance'	pale purple	single	27 in.	40 in.	mid Sep–early Nov	45.2 days	Hadspen Garden, Somerset, England
E. hupehensis 'Praecox'	pink	single	50 in.	33 in.	late Jul–early Oct	51.8 days	Germany, 1935
E. hupehensis 'Superba'	lavender pink	semi-double	26 in.	29 in.	early Sep–early Nov	47.2 days	
E. × hybrida 'Alba'	white	single			mid Sep–late Oct	24.0 days	
E. × hybrida 'Alice'	pale pink	semi-double	32 in.	37 in.	mid Sep–early Nov	53.5 days	W. Pfitzer, Germany
E. × hybrida 'Andrea Atkinson'	white	single to semi-double	35 in.	20 in.	late Aug–mid Nov	64.7 days	
E. × hybrida 'Avalanche'	white	double			mid Aug–late Oct	37.0 days	
E. × hybrida 'Honorine Jobert'	white	single to semi-double	40 in.	33 in.	mid Sep–mid Nov	45.8 days	France, 1858
E. × hybrida 'Königin Charlotte'	pale pink	semi-double	36 in.	31 in.	late Sep–early Nov	25.4 days	W. Pfitzer, Germany, 1898
E. × hybrida 'Kriemhilde'	pink	single to semi-double	30 in.	19 in.	late Aug–early Nov	56.0 days	Germany, 1908
E. × hybrida 'Lady Gilmour'	pale pink	single			late Sep–late Oct	16.0 days	France
E. × hybrida 'Loreley'	pink	semi-double				0.0 days	
E. × hybrida 'Margarete'	deep pink	semi-double	22 in.	30 in.	late Aug–early Nov	49.3 days	Germany
E. × hybrida 'Max Vogel'	pink	semi-double	43 in.	35 in.	mid Aug–early Nov	62.5 days	
E. × hybrida 'Montrose'	pale purple	double	27 in.	30 in.	mid Sep–early Nov	43.5 days	France
E. × hybrida 'Richard Ahrens'	pink	single to semi-double	27 in.	31 in.	mid Sep–late Oct	48.7 days	W. Pfitzer, Germany, 1921
E. × hybrida 'Robustissima'	pink	single	41 in.	40 in.	late Aug–mid Nov	63.0 days	France, 1900
E. × hybrida 'September Charm'	pale purple	single	30 in.	20 in.	late Aug–early Nov	48.2 days	England, 1932
E. × hybrida 'Serenade'	pink	semi-double	23 in.	40 in.	mid Aug–late Oct	64.5 days	
E. × hybrida 'Victor Jones'	pale pink	single	31 in.	35 in.	late Aug–mid Oct	53.4 days	
E. × hybrida 'Whirlwind'	white	semi-double	27 in.	35 in.	early Sep–early Nov	41.1 days	Rochester, New York 1887
E. japonica 'Bressingham Glow'	deep pink	semi-double to double	20 in.	32 in.	early Sep–early Nov	54.2 days	Alan Bloom, England
E. japonica 'Pamina'	deep pink	semi-double to double	30 in.	28 in.	late Aug–late Oct	46.8 days	Germany
E. japonica 'Prinz Heinrich'	rose pink	semi-double to double	28 in.	31 in.	early Sep–early Nov	64.8 days	Germany, 1902
E. japonica 'Splendens'	rose pink	single to semi-double	25 in.	34 in.	late Aug–early Nov	61.2 days	1920
E. tomentosa 'Alba'	white	single			late Sep–early Nov	22.0 days	

As of March 2020, the following cultivars have gained the Award of Garden Merit (AGM) from the Royal Horticultural Society:

- E. hupehensis 'Bowles's Pink'
- E. × hybrida 'Elegans'
- E. hupehensis 'Hadspen Abundance'
- E. × hybrida 'Honorine Jobert'
- E. × hybrida 'Königin Charlotte' ('Queen Charlotte')
- E. japonica 'Pamina'
- E. japonica 'Rotkäppchen'
- E. × hybrida 'September Charm'

The cultivars E. × hybrida 'Andrea Atkinson', E. × hybrida 'Lady Gilmour', E. japonica 'Prinz Heinrich', and E. × hybrida 'Robustissima' were removed from the AGM list in 2013.

== Bibliography ==
- Bowles, Edward A.; Stearn, William T. (1947). "The History of Anemone japonica, Part I". Journal of the Royal Horticultural Society. 72 (7): 261–268.
- Bowles, Edward A.; Stearn, William T. (1947). "The History of Anemone japonica, Part II". Journal of the Royal Horticultural Society. 72 (8): 297–308.
- Gledhill, David (2008). The Names of Plants (4th ed.). Cambridge University Press. ISBN 978-0-521-86645-3.
- Herman, Robert (2004). "Fall-blooming anemones". Fine Gardening. 99: 48–52.
- Rudy, Mark R. (2004). "Fall-blooming Anemones" (PDF). Plant Evaluation Notes, Issue 25. Chicago Botanic Garden.
