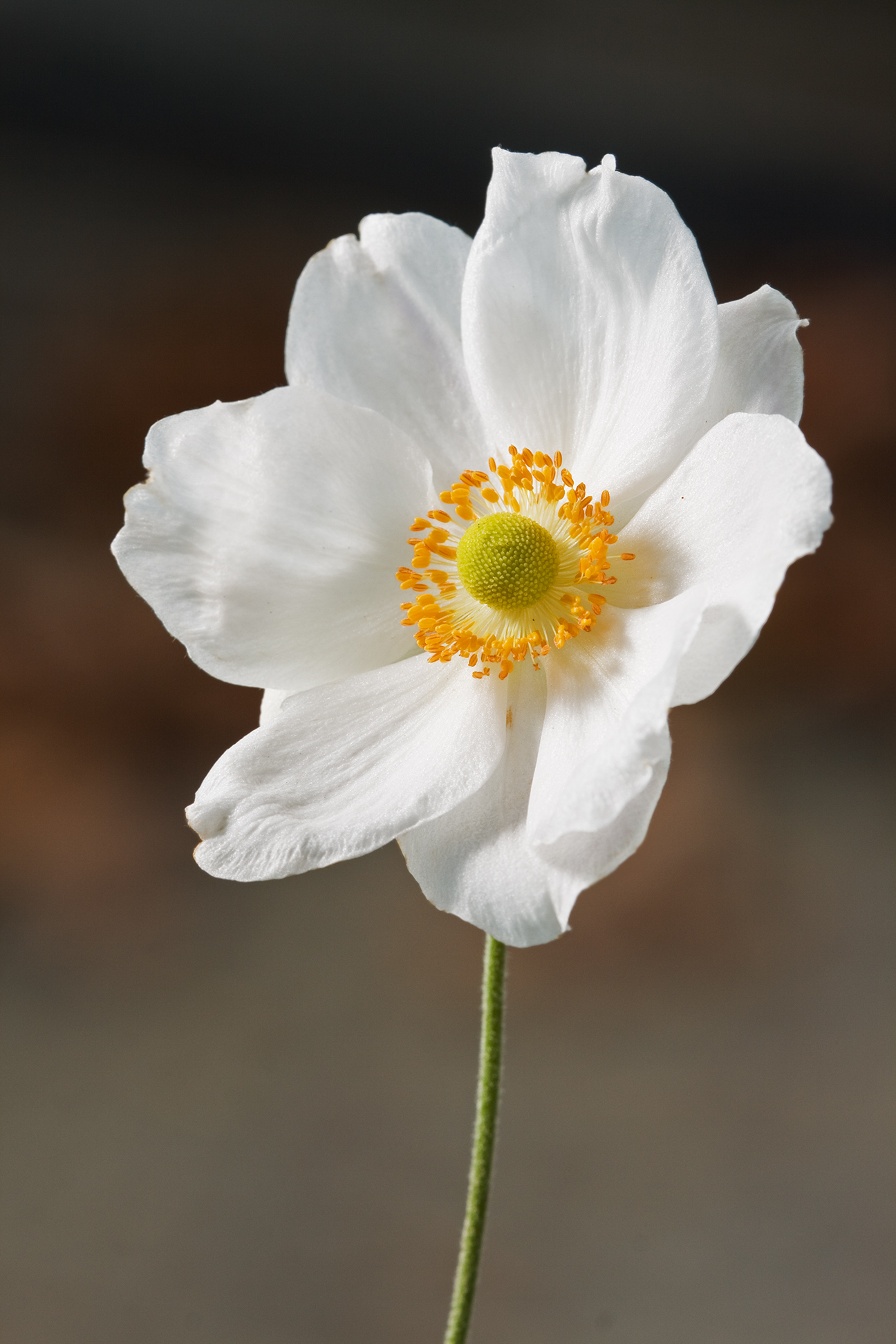
- Japanese anemones have yellow stamens and five white or pink sepals.

Scientific classification
- Kingdom: Plantae
- Clade: Tracheophytes
- Clade: Angiosperms
- Clade: Eudicots
- Order: Ranunculales
- Family: Ranunculaceae
- Genus: Eriocapitella
- Species: E. hupehensis

Binomial name
- Eriocapitella hupehensis (É.Lemoine) Christenh. & Byng

Synonyms
- List: Anemone hupehensis (É.Lemoine) É.Lemoine; Anemone hupehensis f. alba W.T.Wang; Anemone japonica var. hupehensis É.Lemoine; Anemone matsudae (Yamam.) Tamura

= Eriocapitella hupehensis =

Species of flowering plant in the buttercup family

Eriocapitella hupehensis, a species of flowering plant in the Ranunculaceae family of plants and has an extensive native distribution across a large area of Asia. The plant was previously known as Anemone hupehensis and is often still referred to as such. Together with several closely related species and hybrids between these species, in horticulture these plants are often referred to as Japanese anemones.

The specific epithet hupehensis, which means "from Hupeh" (i.e. Hubei), refers to a province in China where the species is known to occur. In Chinese, it is called dǎpòwǎnhuāhuā (打破碗花花), which means "broken bowl flower".

== Description ==
Eriocapitella hupehensis is a perennial herbaceous plant with a rhizome-like root structure. It is a clump-forming plant with 3–5 basal leaves, each with a petiole 5 to 35 cm (2 to 14 in) long. The leaf blades are ternate with a central leaflet 4 to 10 cm (1.6 to 3.9 in) long and 3 to 10 cm (1.2 to 3.9 in) wide. The lateral leaflets are similar to but smaller than the central leaflet. The stem is 30 to 100 cm (12 to 39 in) long, occasionally up to 120 cm (47 in) long. A whorl of 3 leaves (technically bracts) wraps around the stem. The stem leaves are similar in appearance to the basal leaves but somewhat smaller. The inflorescence is a cyme with 2 or 3 branches and a primary flower stalk 3 to 10 cm (1.2 to 3.9 in) long. Each flower is approximately 5 cm (2.0 in) across. In its native habitat, the flower usually has 5 sepals (no petals) but cultivated plants have double flowers with around 20 sepals. The sepals may be purple, purple-red, pink or white. In the center of the flower, there are more than 100 pistils each 1.5 mm long, surrounded by prominent yellow stamens approximately 5 mm (0.2 in) long. The fruits are small ovoid achenes with straight styles.

== Taxonomy ==
Eriocapitella hupehensis was described by Maarten J. M. Christenhusz and James W. Byng in 2018. Like other members of genus Eriocapitella, E. hupehensis was formerly a member of genus Anemone. The basionym Anemone japonica var. hupehensis Lemoine was described in 1908.

== Distribution ==
Eriocapitella hupehensis is native to Asia, in the Eastern Himalaya region, East Asia, and Southeast Asia.

- Eastern Himalaya: Nepal, Assam (northeast India), Tibet
- East and Southeast Asia: China, Taiwan, Myanmar
  - Northwest China: Shaanxi
  - Central China: Hubei
  - East China: Jiangxi, Zhejiang
  - South China: Guangdong, Guangxi
  - Southwest China: Guizhou, Sichuan, Yunnan

The species was introduced into Czechoslovakia, Ecuador, and Germany.

== Ecology ==
Eriocapitella hupehensis along with four other taxa (E. × hybrida, E. japonica, E. tomentosa, and E. vitifolia) are known as fall-blooming anemones. In its native habitat, E. hupehensis flowers from July to October.

== Cultivation ==
Eriocapitella hupehensis and its cultivars are cultivated worldwide, especially in Asia, Europe, and South America, where naturalized populations are known to exist. In China, E. hupehensis has been cultivated since at least the 17th century, probably dating back to the Tang dynasty (618–907). Hundreds of years ago, a semi-double form of E. hupehensis escaped cultivation and spread across China to Japan and Korea. This descendant of E. hupehensis, now known as E. japonica, is a parent of the artificial hybrid E. × hybrida.

At the Chicago Botanic Garden, Rudy experimented with 26 cultivars of fall-blooming anemones over a 5-year period beginning in 1998. His experiments included three cultivars of E. hupehensis:

| Cultivar | Flower color | Flower form | Height | Width | Bloom period | Bloom length |
|---|---|---|---|---|---|---|
| E. hupehensis 'Hadspen Abundance' | pale purple | single | 27 in. | 40 in. | mid Sep-early Nov | 45.2 days |
| E. hupehensis 'Praecox' | pink | single | 50 in. | 33 in. | late Jul-early Oct | 51.8 days |
| E. hupehensis 'Superba' | lavender pink | semi-double | 26 in. | 29 in. | early Sep-early Nov | 47.2 days |

As of March 2020, the following cultivars have gained the Award of Garden Merit (AGM) from the Royal Horticultural Society:

- E. hupehensis 'Bowles's Pink'
- E. hupehensis 'Hadspen Abundance'

== Gallery ==
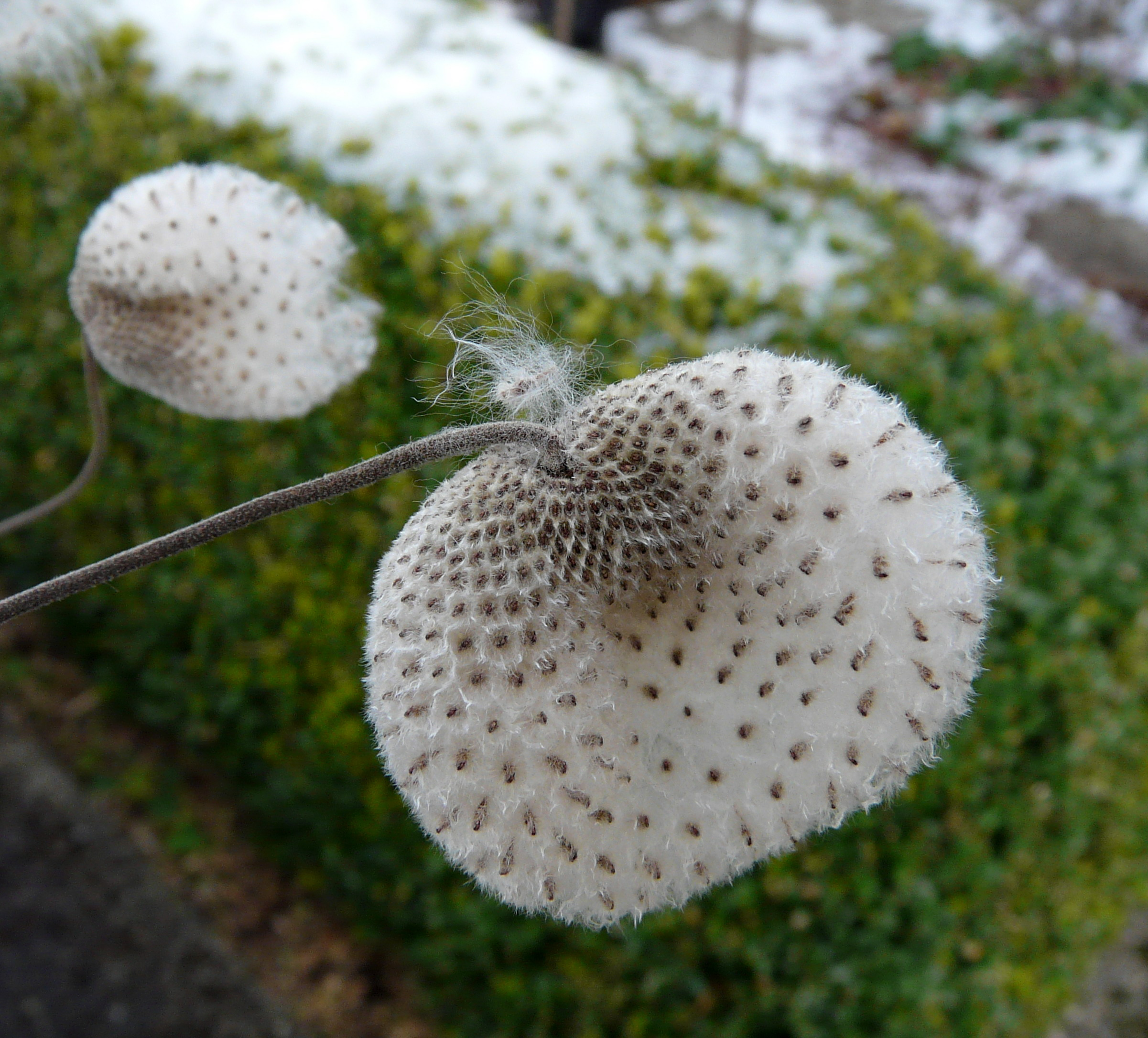
Seeds

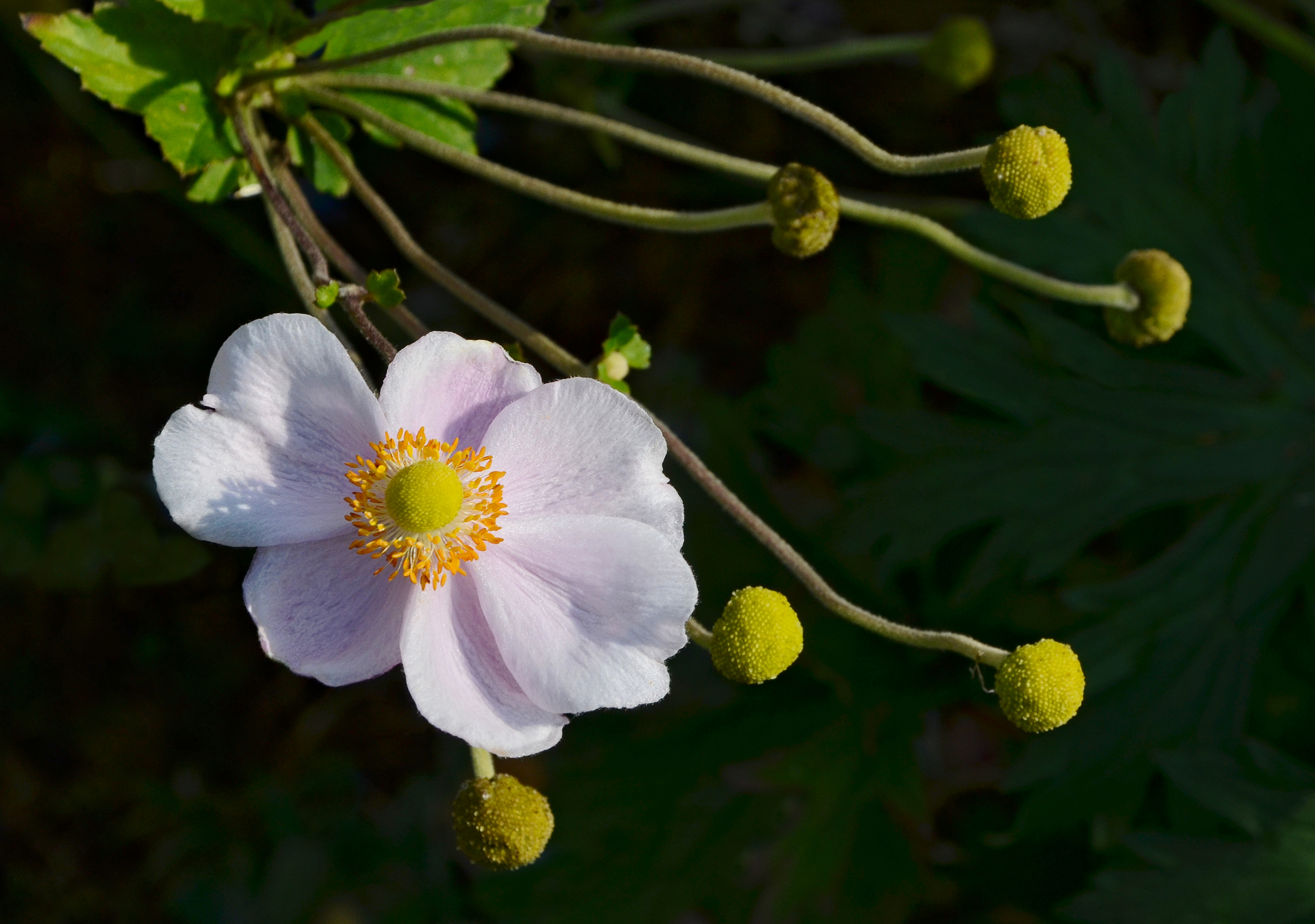
Flower and unripe seedheads in a private garden

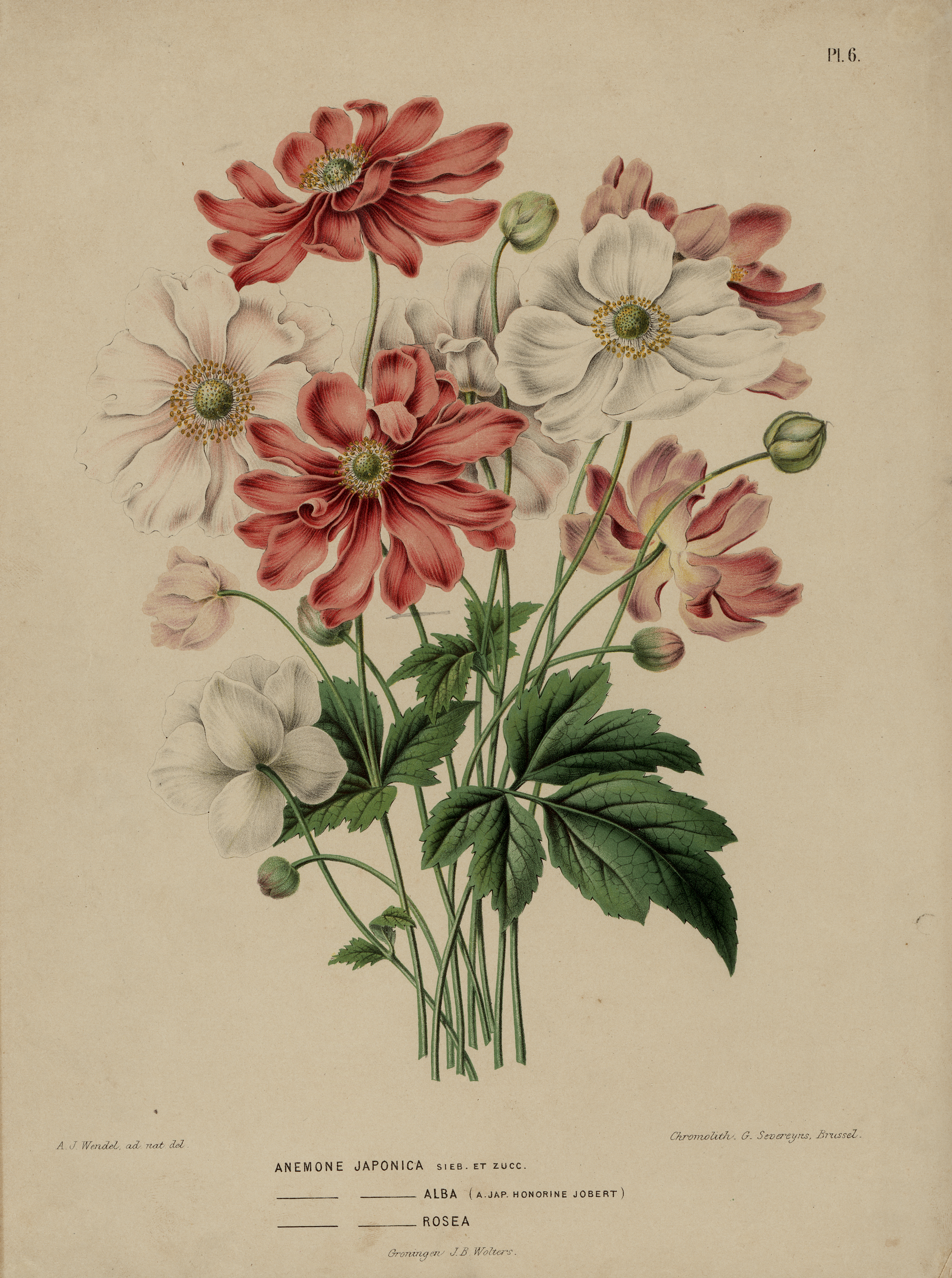
Anemone hupehensis by A.J. Wendel, 1868

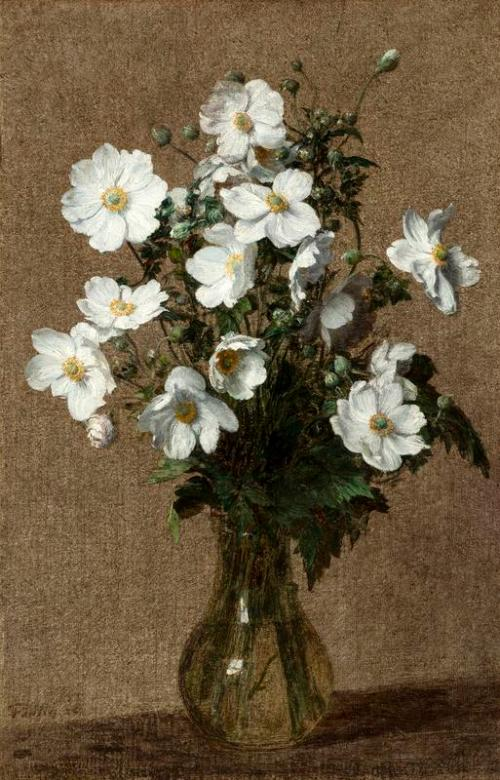
Henri Fantin-Latour, Japanese Anemones, 1884

== See also ==
- Eriocapitella japonica
- Eriocapitella × hybrida

== Bibliography ==
- Gledhill, David (2008). The Names of Plants (4th ed.). Cambridge University Press. ISBN 978-0-521-86645-3.
- Herman, Robert (2004). "Fall-blooming anemones". Fine Gardening. 99: 48–52.
- RHS A-Z encyclopedia of garden plants. United Kingdom: Dorling Kindersley. 2008. p. 1136. ISBN 978-1-4053-3296-5.
- Rudy, Mark R. (2004). "Fall-blooming Anemones" (PDF). Plant Evaluation Notes, Issue 25. Chicago Botanic Garden.
- Wang, Wei; Lu, An-Ming; Ren, Yi; Endress, Mary E.; Chen, Zhi-Duan (January 2009). "Phylogeny and classification of Ranunculales: Evidence from four molecular loci and morphological data". Perspectives in Plant Ecology, Evolution and Systematics. 11 (2): 81–110. doi:10.1016/j.ppees.2009.01.001.
