= James W. Byng =

British botanist (floruit 2014)

- Education: University of Aberdeen
- Scientific career
- Fields: Botany
- Workplaces: TU Delft
- Author abbrev. (botany): Byng

James W. Byng is a British botanist who is the Director of TU Delft Hortus Botanicus (TU Delft Botanic Garden) since 2021. He was trained at the University of Aberdeen, Royal Botanic Gardens Edinburgh and Royal Botanic Gardens, Kew.

He is an authority on the Myrtaceae genus Syzygium Gaertn. and is working on a global monograph for the group with regional collaborators. He is also a co-author on Angiosperm Phylogeny Group plant classifications, APG IV and APG V, and the lead author on the educational APG V poster. In addition, he has authored the practical reference works The Flowering Plants Handbook and The Gymnosperms Handbook with second editions of both titles expected in 2027.

The standard author abbreviation Byng is used to indicate this person as the author when citing a botanical name.
