= P. koreana =

P. koreana may refer to:

- Phyllonorycter koreana, a moth species found in Korea
- Pterotopteryx koreana, a moth species found in Korea
- Pulsatilla koreana, the Korean pasque flower, synonym of a variety of Pulsatilla cernua, a plant species native to Korea and other parts of east Asia

== See also ==
- Koreana (disambiguation)
