= Eastern pasqueflower =

Eastern pasqueflower may refer to:

- Pulsatilla nuttalliana, flowering plant native to much of North America
- Pulsatilla patens, flowering plant native to Europe, Russia, Mongolia, and China
