= Cutleaf anemone =

Cutleaf anemone is a common name for several plant species and may refer to:

- Anemone multifida Poir.
- Pulsatilla nuttalliana
- Pulsatilla patens subsp. multifida, synonym: Anemone multifida (Pritz.) Zamels, non Poir.
