= Pterotopteryx lonicericola =

Scientific classification
- Kingdom: Animalia
- Phylum: Arthropoda
- Clade: Pancrustacea
- Class: Insecta
- Order: Lepidoptera
- Family: Alucitidae
- Genus: Pterotopteryx
- Species: P. lonicericola

Binomial name
- Pterotopteryx lonicericola (Kuznetsov, 1978)

Synonyms
- Alucita lonicericola Kuznetsov, 1978

Species of moth

Pterotopteryx lonicericola is a moth of the family Alucitidae. It is found in Russia, as well as Tajikistan.

The larvae have been reported feeding on Lonicera korolkowii and Lonicera nummulariifolia.
