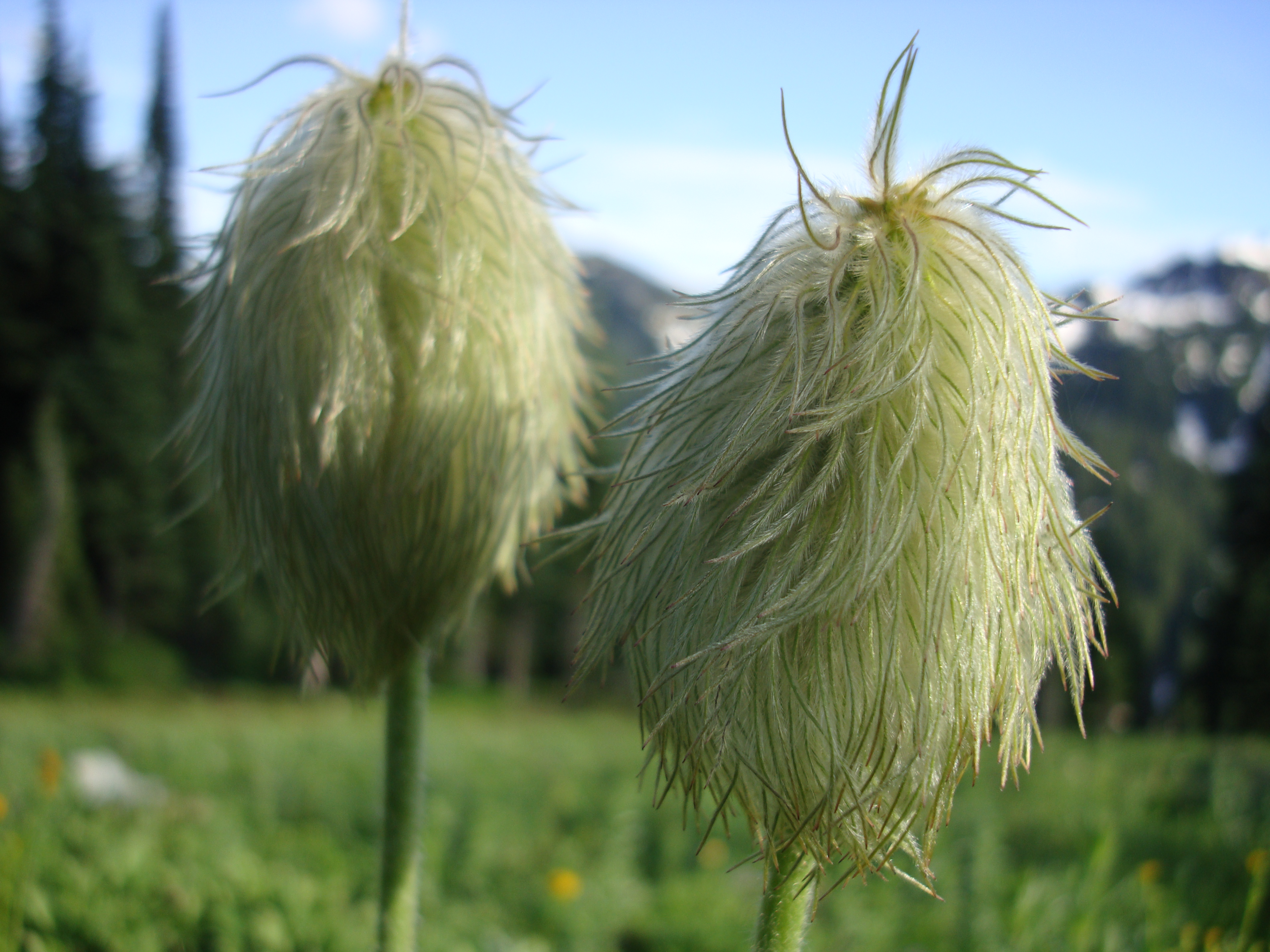
- achene

Conservation status
- Secure (NatureServe)

Scientific classification
- Kingdom: Plantae
- Clade: Tracheophytes
- Clade: Angiosperms
- Clade: Eudicots
- Order: Ranunculales
- Family: Ranunculaceae
- Genus: Pulsatilla
- Species: P. occidentalis

Binomial name
- Pulsatilla occidentalis (S.Watson) Freyn

Synonyms
- Anemone occidentalis S.Watson; Anemone occidentalis var. subpilosa Hardin; Preonanthus occidentalis (S.Watson) Skalický

= Pulsatilla occidentalis =

Species of flowering plant

Pulsatilla occidentalis, synonym Anemone occidentalis, the white pasqueflower or western pasqueflower, is a herbaceous species of flowering plant in the buttercup family Ranunculaceae. Individuals are 10–60 cm (3.9–23.6 in) tall, from caudices, with three to six leaves at the base of the plant that are 3-foliolate, each leaflet pinnatifid to dissected in shape. Leaf petioles are 6–10 cm (2.4–3.9 in) long. Leaves have villous hairs and their margins are pinnatifid or dissected. Plants flower briefly mid-spring to mid-summer, usually soon after the ground is exposed by melting snow. The flowers are composed of five to seven sepals (sometimes called tepals), normally white or soft purple, also mixed white and blueish purple, one flower per stem. The sepals are 15–30 mm (0.59–1.18 in) long and 10–17 mm (0.39–0.67 in) wide. Flowers have 150–200 stamens. The fruit occurs in heads rounded to subcylindric in shape, with pedicels 15–20 cm (5.9–7.9 in) long. The achenes are ellipsoid in shape, not winged, covered with villous hairs, with beaks curved that reflex as they age and 20–40 mm (0.79–1.57 in) long, feather-like. Generally, the fruit persists into fall.

Native to far western North America including British Columbia to California and Montana, it is found growing in gravelly soils on slopes and in moist meadows.

== Chemistry ==
Western pasqueflower likely contains ranunculin and protoanemonin, an irritant glycoside and its aglycone, as these are seen in most members of this genus and the plant's latex is irritating. It can be fatal to domestic animals, particularly to sheep, and should thus not be eaten by humans.

== Traditional medicine ==
The fresh stems and seeds of the plant are used traditionally in North America as analgesics, anxiolytics, and sedatives.

== Landmarks ==
Pulsatilla Pass in Banff National Park is named after this species.

== Image gallery ==
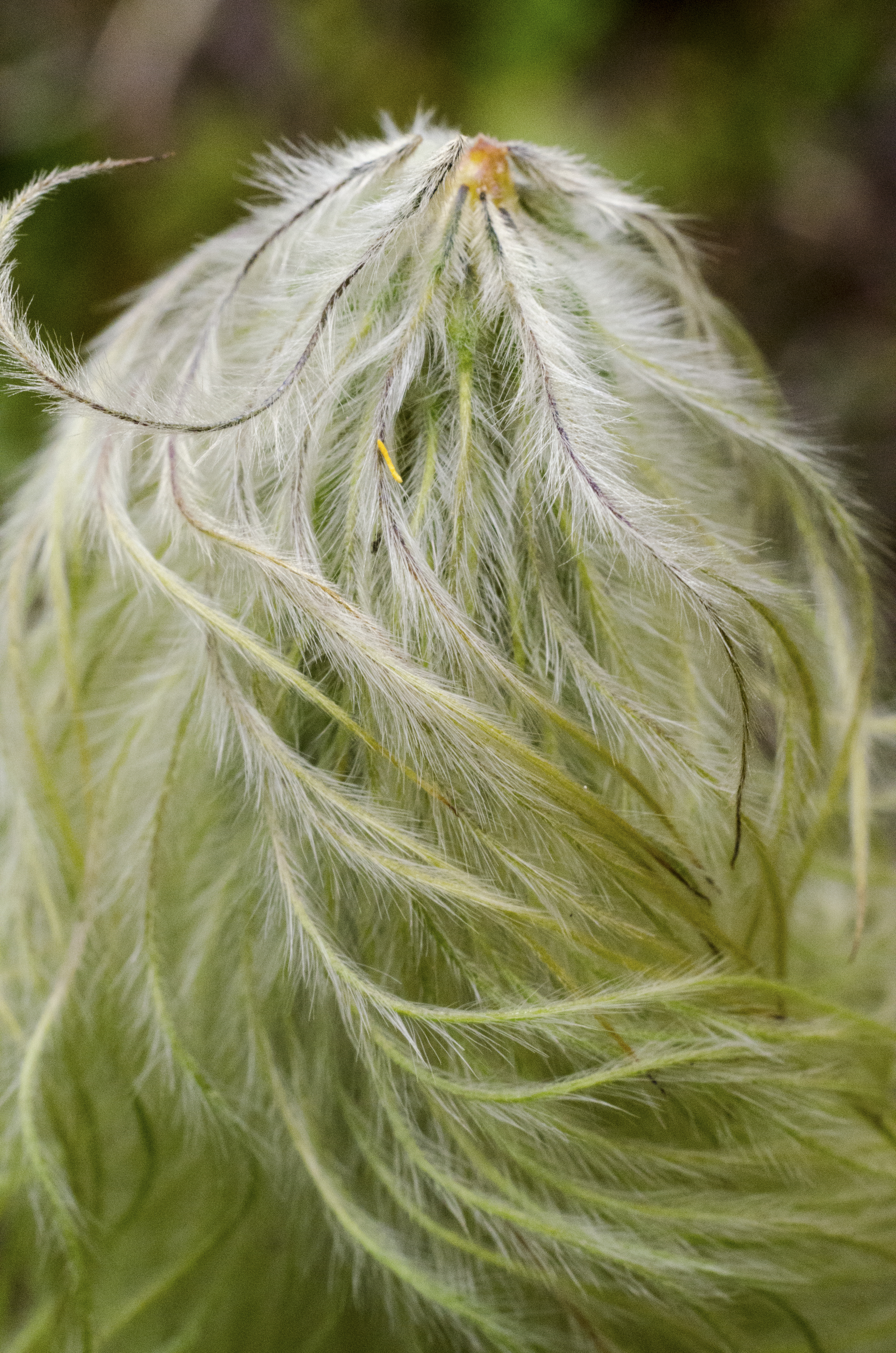
In Kootenay National Park, Canada

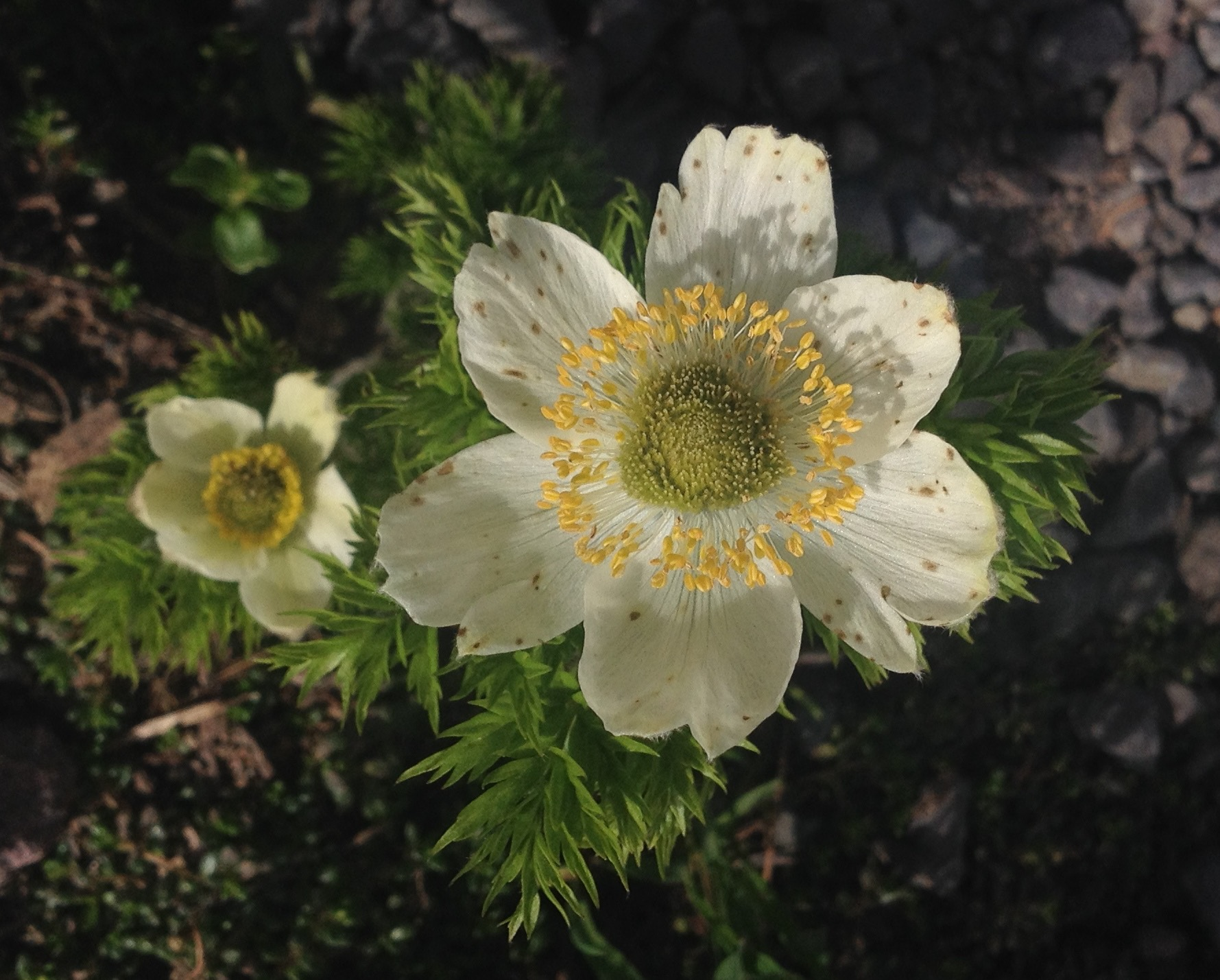
Flower

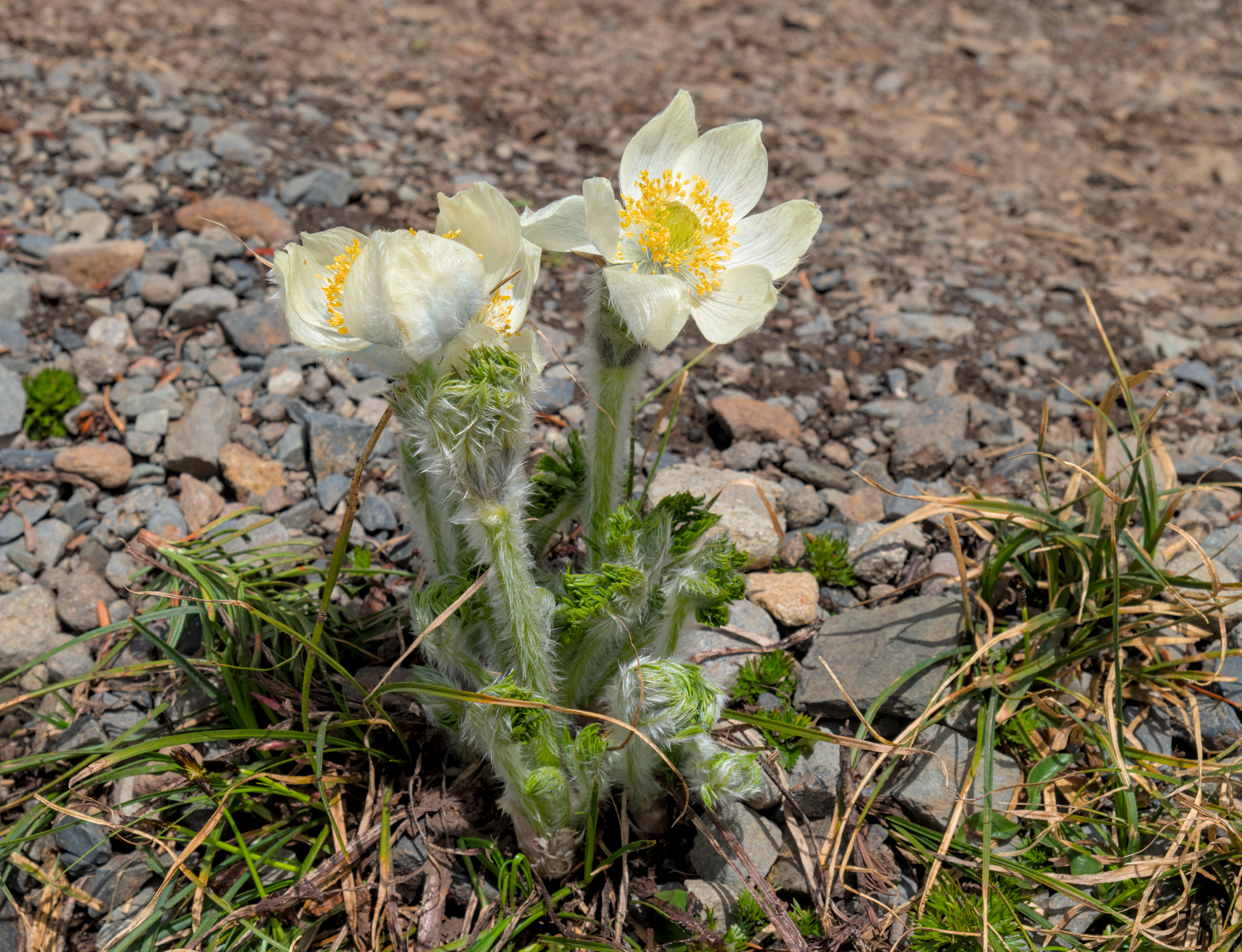
Flowers

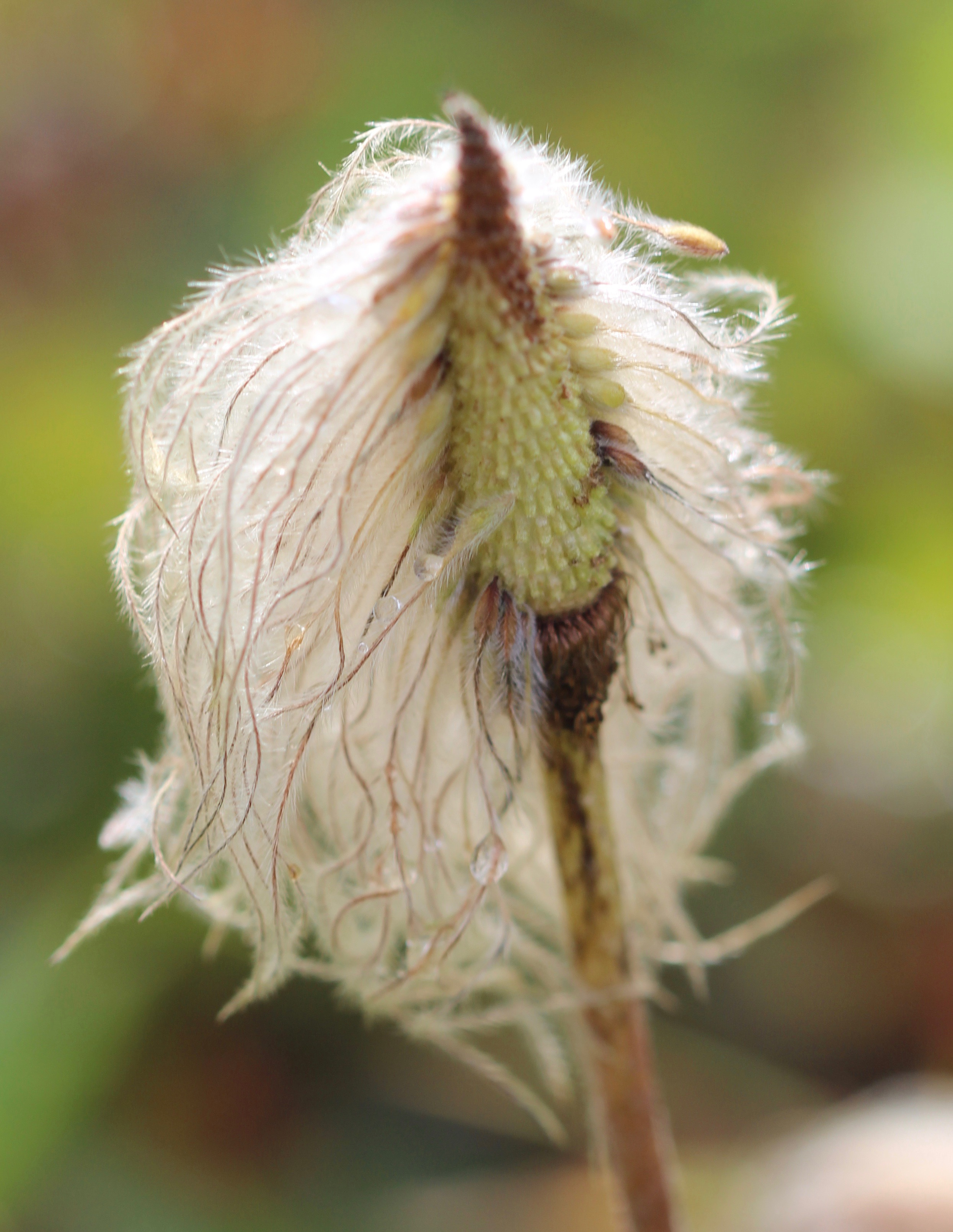
On Mount Rainier with some achenes cut away to show the receptacle and seeds

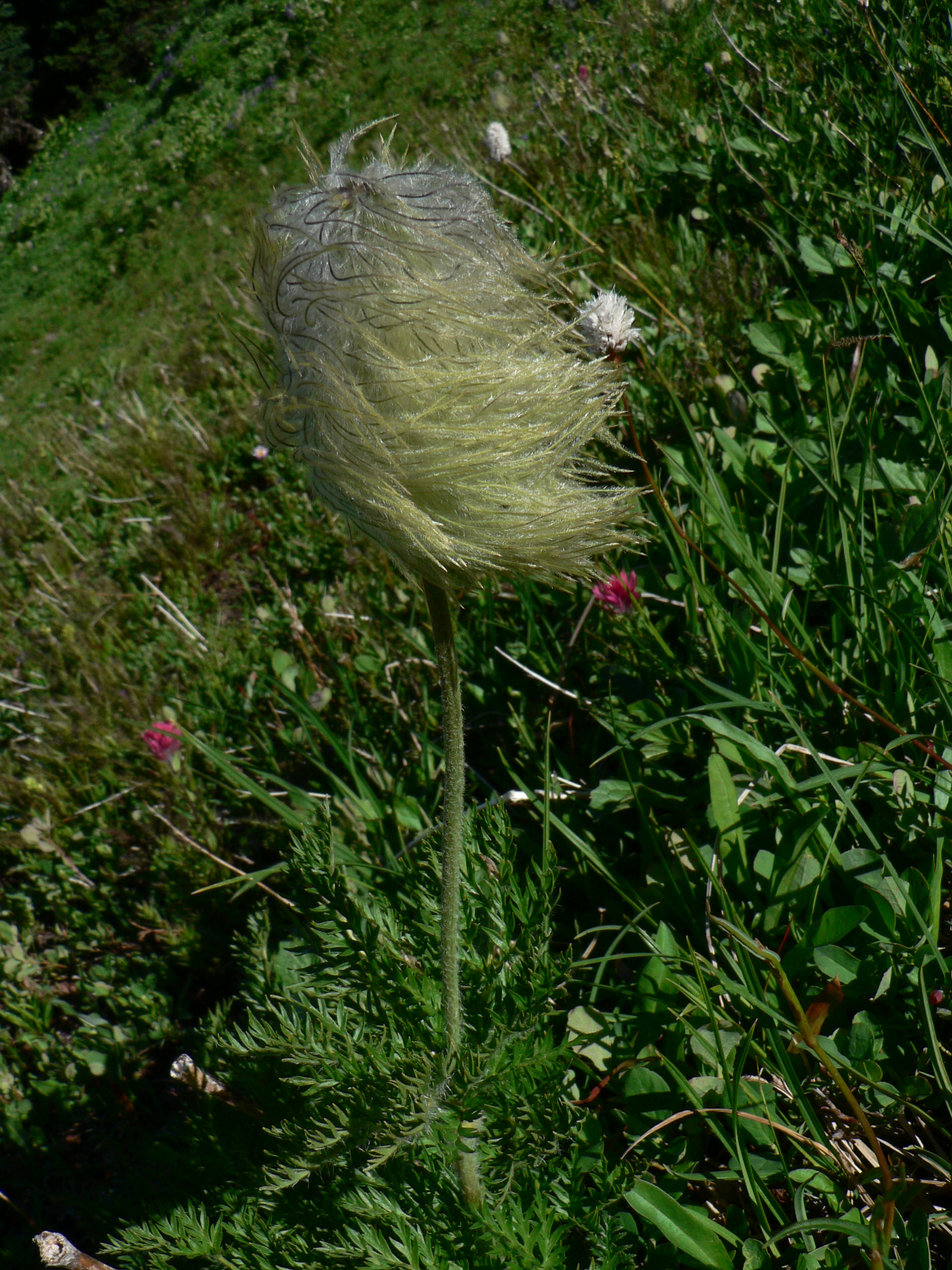
The persistent achenes and foliage are distinguishing features.
