= Pterotopteryx tshatkalica =

Scientific classification
- Domain: Eukaryota
- Kingdom: Animalia
- Phylum: Arthropoda
- Class: Insecta
- Order: Lepidoptera
- Family: Alucitidae
- Genus: Pterotopteryx
- Species: P. tshatkalica

Binomial name
- Pterotopteryx tshatkalica Zagulajev, 1995

Species of moth

Pterotopteryx tshatkalica is a moth of the family Alucitidae. It was described by Zagulajev in 1995. It is found in Uzbekistan.
