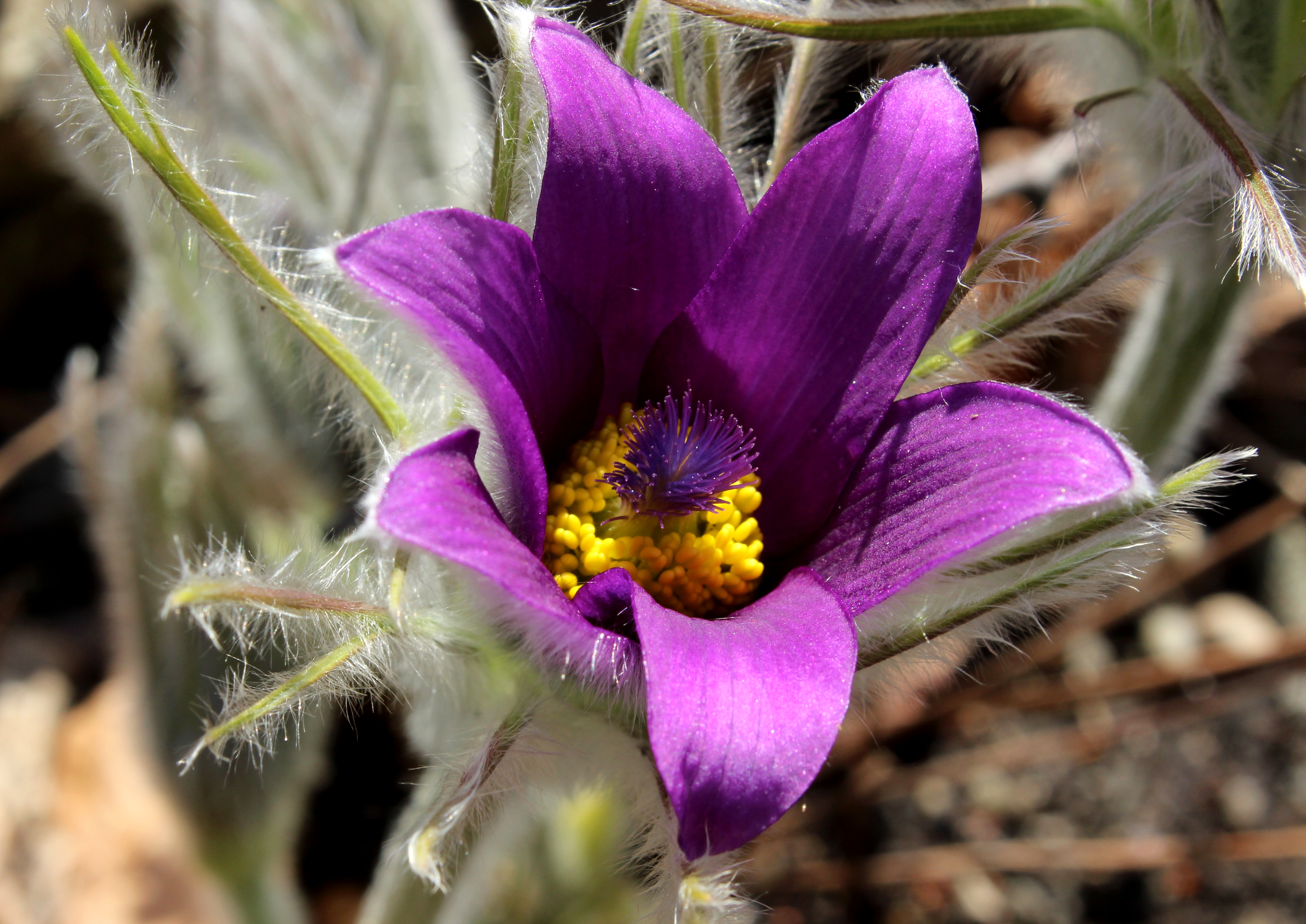
- Flower at the Botanical Garden of the University of Vienna

Conservation status
- Least Concern (IUCN 3.1)

Scientific classification
- Kingdom: Plantae
- Clade: Embryophytes
- Clade: Tracheophytes
- Clade: Spermatophytes
- Clade: Angiosperms
- Clade: Eudicots
- Order: Ranunculales
- Family: Ranunculaceae
- Genus: Pulsatilla
- Species: P. halleri

Binomial name
- Pulsatilla halleri (All.) Willd.

Synonyms
- Of the species: Anemone halleri All.; Anemone halleri var. villosissima Pritz.; Anemone pulsatilla subsp. halleri (All.) Bonnier & Layens; Pulsatilla halleri subsp. villosissima Zämelis & Paegle

= Pulsatilla halleri =

Haller's anemone

Species of flowering plant in the buttercup family

Pulsatilla halleri, synonym Anemone halleri, Haller's anemone, is a species of flowering plant in the buttercup family Ranunculaceae, that can be found in sub-alpine and alpine regions of southern France, southern Switzerland, northern Italy and Poland, extending eastward to Greece, Bulgaria and Ukraine. It is found in mountain meadows, dry hills, dry grassy locations and mountainous forest glades. It is collected and cultivated for botanical and private gardens.

Growing in clumps to 20 cm (7.9 in) tall and wide, this herbaceous perennial has hairy grey-green foliage, and in spring produces pink or purple flowers which form ornamental silky seedheads. It prefers an exposed, well-drained position in full sun.

Anemone halleri is mildly toxic, and can cause stomach ache on skin contact.

The species and the subspecies P. halleri subsp. slavica are recipients of the Royal Horticultural Society's Award of Garden Merit.

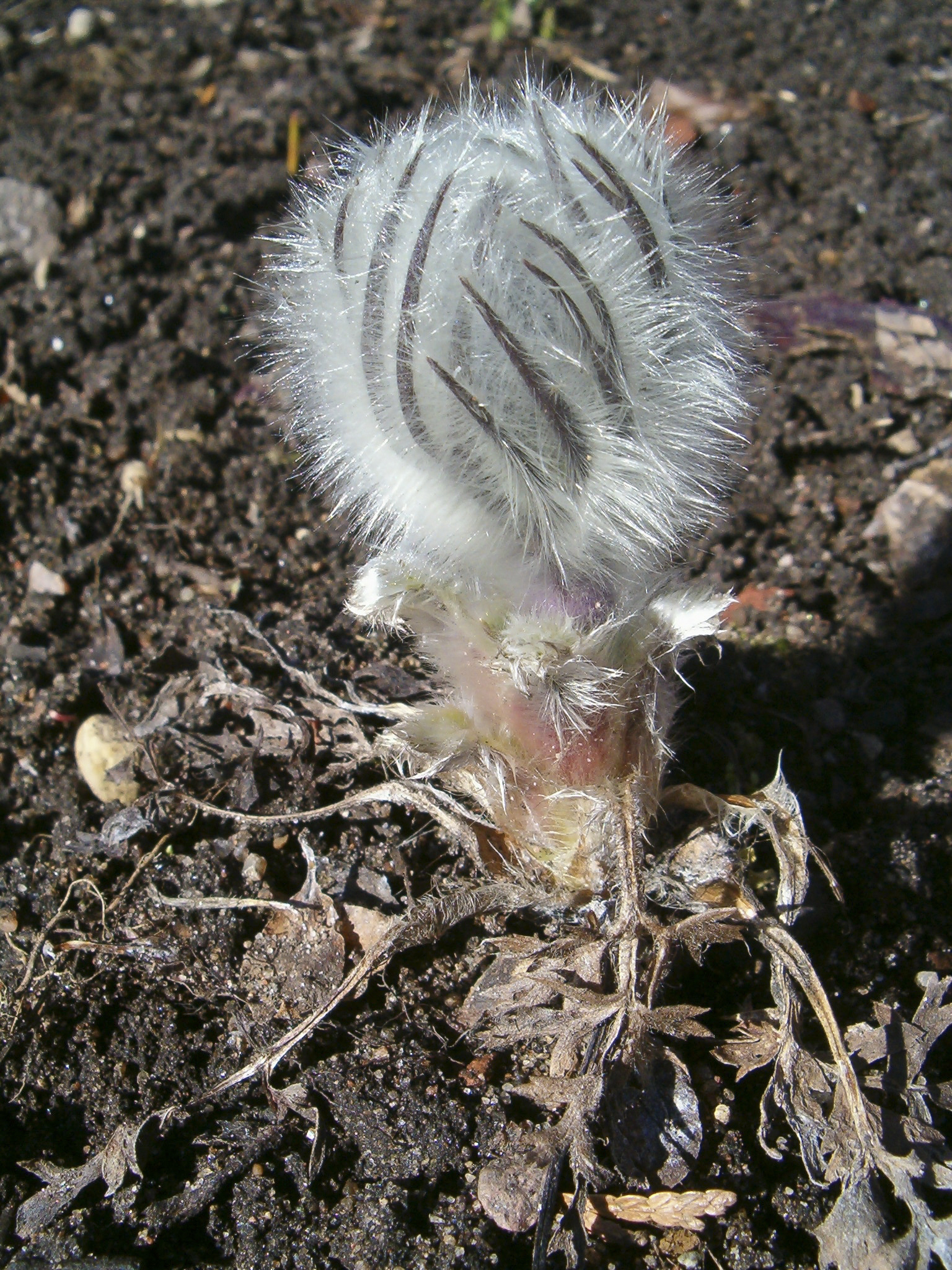

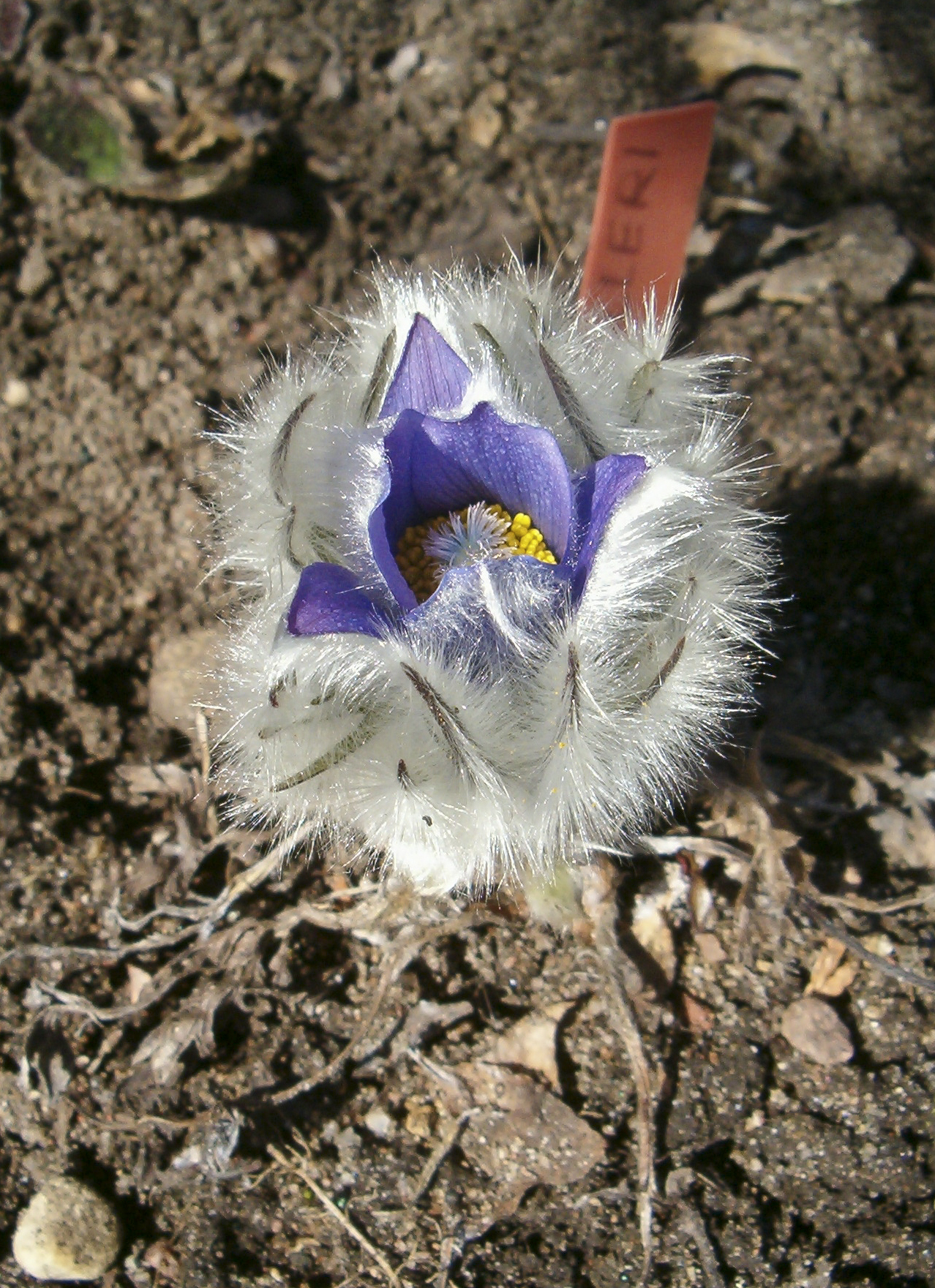

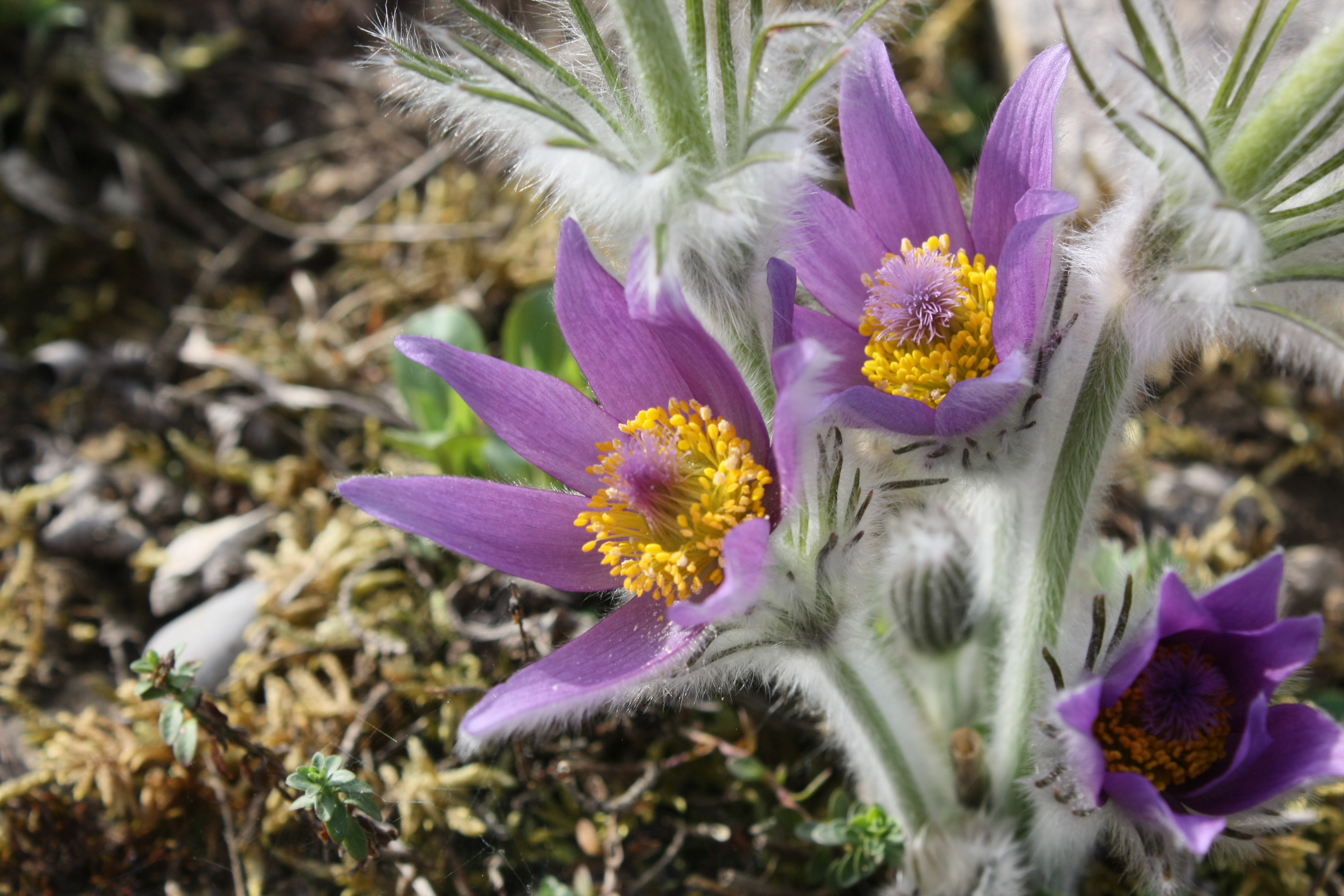
