= Pulsatilla bungeana =

Scientific classification
- Kingdom: Plantae
- Clade: Tracheophytes
- Clade: Angiosperms
- Clade: Eudicots
- Order: Ranunculales
- Family: Ranunculaceae
- Genus: Pulsatilla
- Species: P. bungeana

Binomial name
- Pulsatilla bungeana C.A.Mey.

Species of plant

Pulsatilla bungeana is a species of flowering plant belonging to the family Ranunculaceae.

It is native to Southern Siberia to Mongolia.
