= Pterotopteryx vietana =

Scientific classification
- Kingdom: Animalia
- Phylum: Arthropoda
- Class: Insecta
- Order: Lepidoptera
- Family: Alucitidae
- Genus: Pterotopteryx
- Species: P. vietana

Binomial name
- Pterotopteryx vietana Byun & Park, 2007

Species of moth

Pterotopteryx vietana is a moth of the family Alucitidae. It was described by Bong-Kyu Byun and Kyu-Tek Park in 2007. It is found in Vietnam (the Vin Phu Province).
