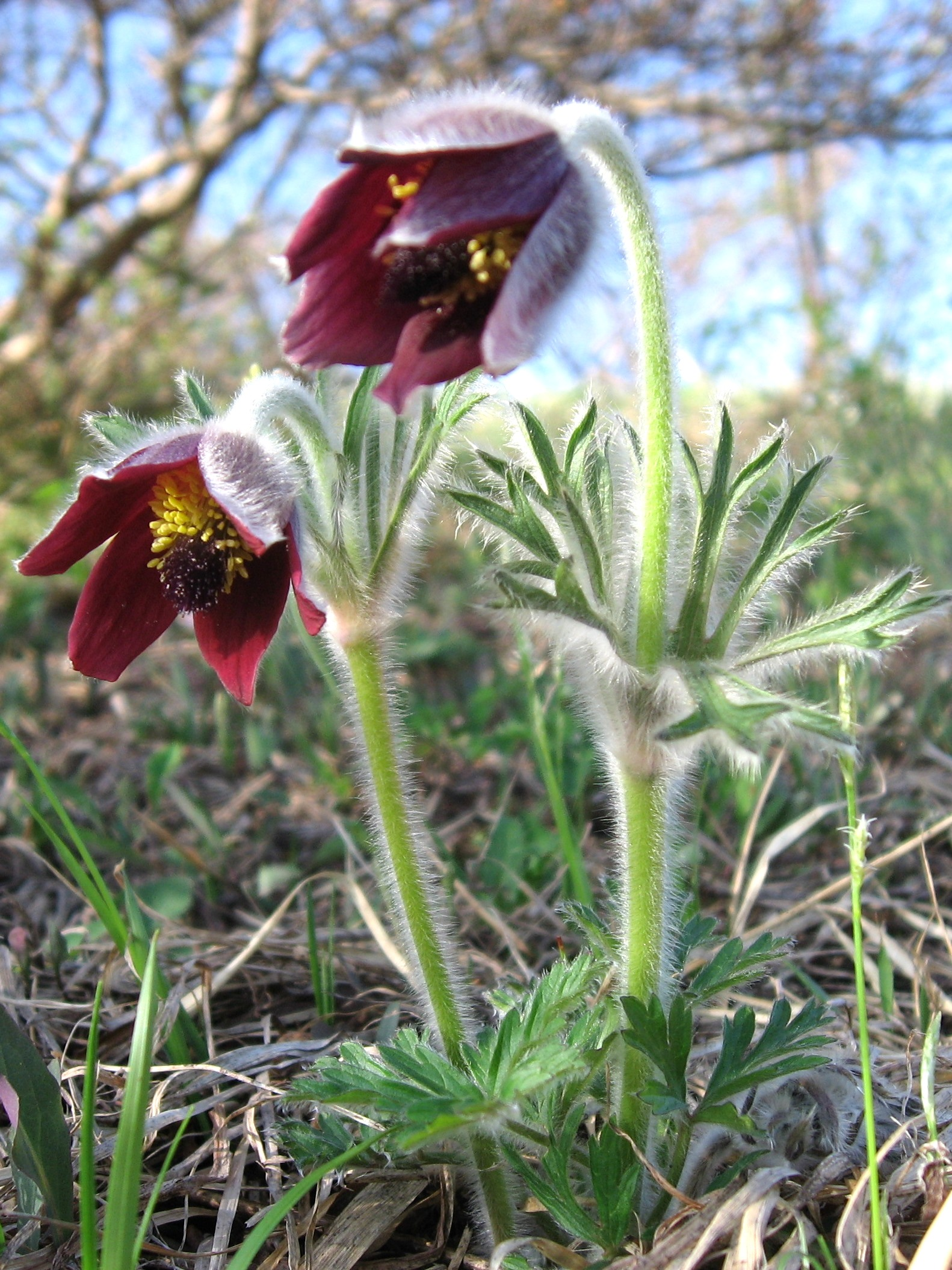
- In Japan

Scientific classification
- Kingdom: Plantae
- Clade: Tracheophytes
- Clade: Angiosperms
- Clade: Eudicots
- Order: Ranunculales
- Family: Ranunculaceae
- Subfamily: Ranunculoideae
- Tribe: Anemoneae
- Genus: Pulsatilla
- Species: P. cernua

Binomial name
- Pulsatilla cernua (Thunb.) Chaz.

Synonyms
- Of the species: Anemone cernua Thunb.; Of subsp. cernua: Pulsatilla cernua var. plena Makino; Of subsp. koreana: Anemone cernua var. flava Makino; Anemone cernua var. koreana Y.Yabe ex Nakai; Pulsatilla koreana (Y.Yabe ex Nakai) T.Mori

= Pulsatilla cernua =

Species of flowering plant

Pulsatilla cernua, the narrow-leaf pasque-flower, is a species of plant in the family Ranunculaceae. It is a perennial plant. It has dark red/purple flowers with white, silky villose hairs. Pulsatilla cernua flowers from April to May, and then the seeds ripen from May to June. P. cernua is insect pollinated. This plant has both male and female parts, which means it is a hermaphrodite. Most parts of this plant are not edible, except for the roots and leaves.

== Description ==
Pulsatilla cernua is 15–45 cm (6–18 in) tall, and is covered with long soft simple hairs. It grows from rhizomes that are 6–12 cm (2–5 in) long by 7–12 mm (0.3–0.5 in) across. Plants have 3–6 or more leaves, which have not fully expanded when the plant flowers. The leaves are borne on a petiole 4.5–18 cm (2–7 in) long and are pinnate with 5–7 three-lobed leaflets. Overall the leaf is 3.5–12 cm (1.4–4.7 in) long by 4–11 cm (1.6–4.3 in) across. The flowers are carried on scapes 7–18 cm (3–7 in) long which have three bracts, each joined at the base into a tube and then with three to five divisions. The flowers are bell-shaped with six generally reddish to dark purple oblong sepals, hairy on the outside and 2–3.5 cm (0.8–1.4 in) long. Flowers have many stamens with yellow anthers. The fruits are narrow achenes, 2–5.5 mm (0.1–0.2 in) long, densely hairy, with an incurved beak with spreading hairs.

== Taxonomy ==
Pulsatilla cernua was first described by Carl Peter Thunberg in 1784 as Anemone cernua. It was moved to the genus Pulsatilla soon afterwards in 1790. Anemone and Pulsatilla are placed in the tribe Anemoneae within the family Ranunculaceae. Generic boundaries within the tribe have been disputed, but as of March 2024, Plants of the World Online accepted the placement in Pulsatilla, as does the Flora of Korea.

=== Subspecies ===
As of March 2024, Plants of the World Online accepted two subspecies:

- Pulsatilla cernua var. cernua
- Pulsatilla cernua var. koreana (Y.Yabe ex Nakai) Y.N.Lee

The two subspecies can be distinguished by the width of the final divisions (the ultimate lobules) of the fully mature leaves. In P. cernua var. koreana they are 5–13 mm (0.2–0.5 in) wide, whereas in P. cernua var. cernua, they are much narrower, only 2–3 mm (0.08–0.12 in) wide.

== Distribution and habitat ==
Pulsatilla cernua is native to the east of Asia: Amur Oblast, Khabarovsk Krai, and Primorsky Krai) in the Russian Far East; Inner Mongolia and Manchuria in China; Korea; and Japan. P. cernua var. cernua is absent from the Russian Far East, and is only found in Jeju Province in Korea, whereas P. cernua var. koreana is not found in Inner Mongolia or Japan.

This plant is commonly found in the low mountains of Japan as well as grassy slopes in the northern parts of China. In Korea, it is said to grow on open, sunny, grassy slopes.

Pulsatilla cernua prefers moist soil, which is why it is found in lower parts of the mountains or on slopes. The soil must also be sandy and loamy and be well drained, or else Pulsatilla cernua will not live and grow. Pulsatilla cernua can also grow in acidic, basic, or neutral soil. It can even manage to grow in very alkaline soils. This plant also cannot grow in shady areas, and it must be in a position where it is almost always in the sun's light.

== Traditional medicine ==
Pulsatilla cernua var. koreana (syn. Pulsatilla koreana) is a traditional Korean herbal medicine.
