= Metanemone =

Scientific classification
- Kingdom: Plantae
- Clade: Tracheophytes
- Clade: Angiosperms
- Clade: Eudicots
- Order: Ranunculales
- Family: Ranunculaceae
- Subfamily: Ranunculoideae
- Tribe: Anemoneae
- Genus: Metanemone; W.T.Wang
- Species: M. ranunculoides

Binomial name
- Metanemone ranunculoides W.T.Wang

Genus of flowering plants

Metanemone is a monotypic genus of flowering plants belonging to the family Ranunculaceae. The only species is Metanemone ranunculoides.

Its native range is Southern Central China.
