= Pterotopteryx synaphodactyla =

Scientific classification
- Domain: Eukaryota
- Kingdom: Animalia
- Phylum: Arthropoda
- Class: Insecta
- Order: Lepidoptera
- Family: Alucitidae
- Genus: Pterotopteryx
- Species: P. synaphodactyla

Binomial name
- Pterotopteryx synaphodactyla (Alphéraky, 1876)

Synonyms
- Orneodes synaphodactyla Alphéraky, 1876

Species of moth

Pterotopteryx synaphodactyla is a moth of the family Alucitidae. It was described by Sergei Alphéraky in 1876. It is found in Russia.
