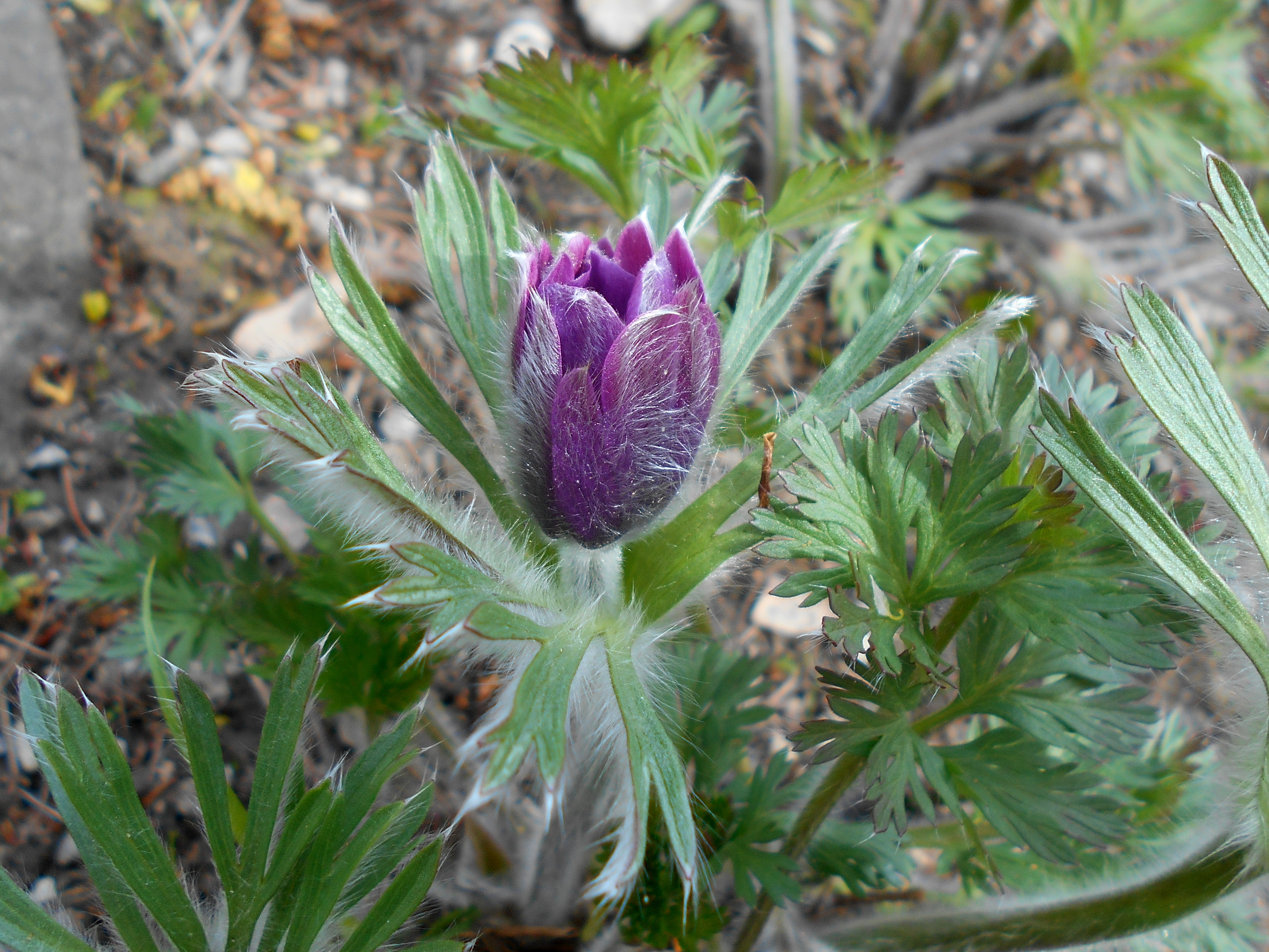

Conservation status
- Data Deficient (IUCN 3.1)

Scientific classification
- Kingdom: Plantae
- Clade: Embryophytes
- Clade: Tracheophytes
- Clade: Spermatophytes
- Clade: Angiosperms
- Clade: Eudicots
- Order: Ranunculales
- Family: Ranunculaceae
- Genus: Pulsatilla
- Species: P. zimmermannii

Binomial name
- Pulsatilla zimmermannii Soó, 1966

Synonyms
- Pulsatilla pratensis subsp. hungarica

= Pulsatilla zimmermannii =

Species of flowering plant

Pulsatilla zimmermannii, also called Zimmermann's pasqueflower, is a species of flowering plant of the family Ranunculaceae.

== Description ==
P. zimmermannii is a herbaceous perennial which grows up to 30 cm (12 in) with feathery leaves. It has dark purple flowers with yellow stamens and purple stigmas which bloom from March to April and last between 5 and 11 days.

== Habitat ==
P. zimmermannii is a calciphile and mostly grows on sunny mountain slopes and hillsides. It has also been found to grow on dry pastures with non-calcareous soils.

== Distribution ==
The native range of P. zimmermannii is limited to Slovakia and Hungary, but it is mostly found in northern and central Hungary. In the past, it was also found in the southern lowlands of the Slanské Hills.
