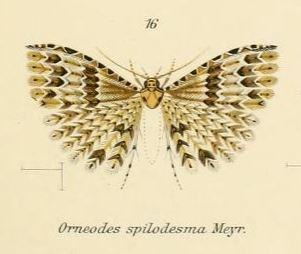

Scientific classification
- Kingdom: Animalia
- Phylum: Arthropoda
- Class: Insecta
- Order: Lepidoptera
- Family: Alucitidae
- Genus: Pterotopteryx
- Species: P. spilodesma

Binomial name
- Pterotopteryx spilodesma (Meyrick, 1907)

Synonyms
- Orneodes spilodesma Meyrick, 1907; Orneodes ochracea Marumo, 1923; Orneodes isshikii Matsumura, 1931; Alucita spilodesma Inoue, 1982

= Pterotopteryx spilodesma =

Species of moth

Pterotopteryx spilodesma is a moth of the family Alucitidae. It was described by Edward Meyrick in 1907. It is found in Russia (Primorskii krai, Sakhalin, the Kurils) and from southern India and Pakistan to Japan (northwards to Hokkaido). It has also been recorded from Korea.

The larvae feed on Lonicera species, including Lonicera quinquelocularis.
