= Pterotopteryx colchica =

Scientific classification
- Domain: Eukaryota
- Kingdom: Animalia
- Phylum: Arthropoda
- Class: Insecta
- Order: Lepidoptera
- Family: Alucitidae
- Genus: Pterotopteryx
- Species: P. colchica

Binomial name
- Pterotopteryx colchica Zagulajev, 1992

Species of moth

Pterotopteryx colchica is a moth of the family Alucitidae. It was described by Zagulajev in 1992. It is found in Adjara.
