= Pulsatilla integrifolia =

Scientific classification
- Kingdom: Plantae
- Clade: Tracheophytes
- Clade: Angiosperms
- Clade: Eudicots
- Order: Ranunculales
- Family: Ranunculaceae
- Genus: Pulsatilla
- Species: P. integrifolia

Binomial name
- Pulsatilla integrifolia (Miyabe & Tatew.) Tatew. & Ohwi ex Vorosch.

Synonyms
- Miyakea integrifolia Miyabe & Tatew.

Species of flowering plant

Pulsatilla integrifolia is a species of plant in the family Ranunculaceae endemic to Sakhalin.
