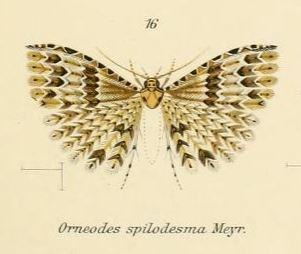

Scientific classification
- Domain: Eukaryota
- Kingdom: Animalia
- Phylum: Arthropoda
- Class: Insecta
- Order: Lepidoptera
- Family: Alucitidae
- Genus: Pterotopteryx; Hannemann, 1959

= Pterotopteryx =

Genus of moths

Pterotopteryx is a genus of moths in the family Alucitidae. The genus was described by Hans-Joachim Hannemann in 1959.

== Species ==
- Pterotopteryx colchica Zagulajev, 1992
- Pterotopteryx dodecadactyla Hübner, 1813
- Pterotopteryx koreana Byun, 2006
- Pterotopteryx lonicericola Kuznetsov, 1978
- Pterotopteryx monticola Zagulajev, 1992
- Pterotopteryx nigrifasciata Byun & Park, 2007
- Pterotopteryx spilodesma (Meyrick, 1907)
- Pterotopteryx synaphodactyla (Alphéraky, 1876)
- Pterotopteryx tshatkalica Zagulajev, 1995
- Pterotopteryx vietana Byun & Park, 2007
