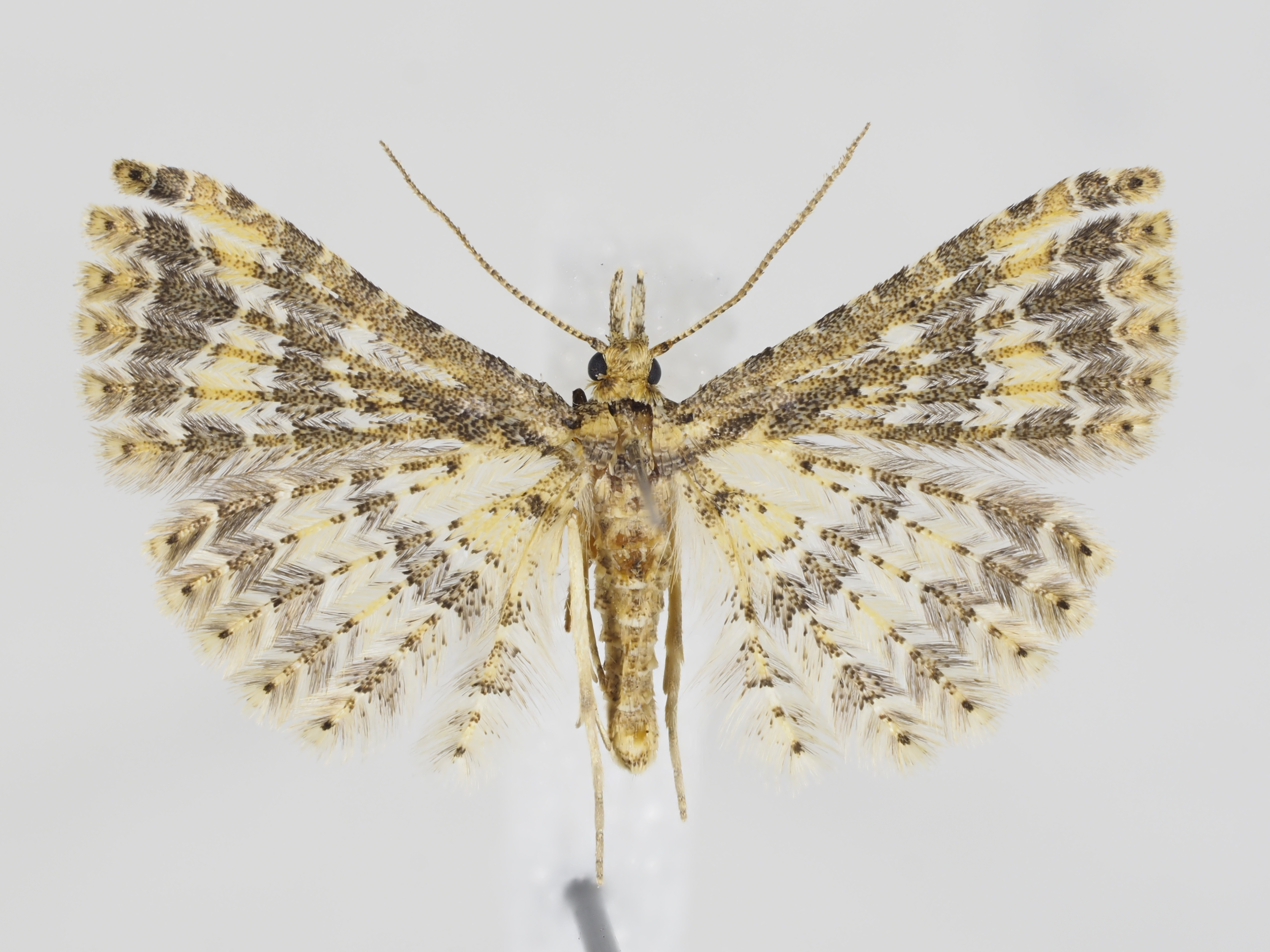

Scientific classification
- Kingdom: Animalia
- Phylum: Arthropoda
- Clade: Pancrustacea
- Class: Insecta
- Order: Lepidoptera
- Family: Alucitidae
- Genus: Pterotopteryx
- Species: P. dodecadactyla

Binomial name
- Pterotopteryx dodecadactyla (Hübner, [1813])

Synonyms
- Alucita dodecadactyla Hübner, [1813]; Orneodes dorcadius M. Hering, 1917

= Pterotopteryx dodecadactyla =

Species of moth

Pterotopteryx dodecadactyla is a moth of the family Alucitidae. It is found in Russia, Croatia, Slovenia, Hungary, Romania, Austria, Slovakia, the Czech Republic, Poland, Estonia, Fennoscandia, Germany, Switzerland, France and Italy. It has also been recorded from Gabon.

The wingspan is 11–14 mm. Adults are on wing from April to August.

The larvae are oligophagous and have been reported feeding on Lonicera caprifolium and Lonicera xylosteum. They mine the leaves of their host plant. Larvae can be found in June. Pupation takes place within a cocoon on the ground.
