= Pulsatilla nivalis =

Scientific classification
- Kingdom: Plantae
- Clade: Tracheophytes
- Clade: Angiosperms
- Clade: Eudicots
- Order: Ranunculales
- Family: Ranunculaceae
- Genus: Pulsatilla
- Species: P. nivalis

Binomial name
- Pulsatilla nivalis Nakai

Species of flowering plant

Pulsatilla nivalis is a perennial herb in the Ranunculaceae family, and is found only on the Korean Peninsula.

The species was first described in 1919 by Takenoshin Nakai.

Its dark red flowers may be seen in June and July, on mountain slopes in North Hamgyong Province, on Baekdu Mountain and Gwanmo Peak at altitudes of about 2,200m above sea level.
