= Pterotopteryx nigrifasciata =

Scientific classification
- Kingdom: Animalia
- Phylum: Arthropoda
- Class: Insecta
- Order: Lepidoptera
- Family: Alucitidae
- Genus: Pterotopteryx
- Species: P. nigrifasciata

Binomial name
- Pterotopteryx nigrifasciata Byun & Park, 2007

Species of moth

Pterotopteryx nigrifasciata is a moth of the family Alucitidae. It was described by Bong-Kyu Byun and Kyu-Tek Park in 2007. It is found in Ninh Bình Province, Vietnam.
