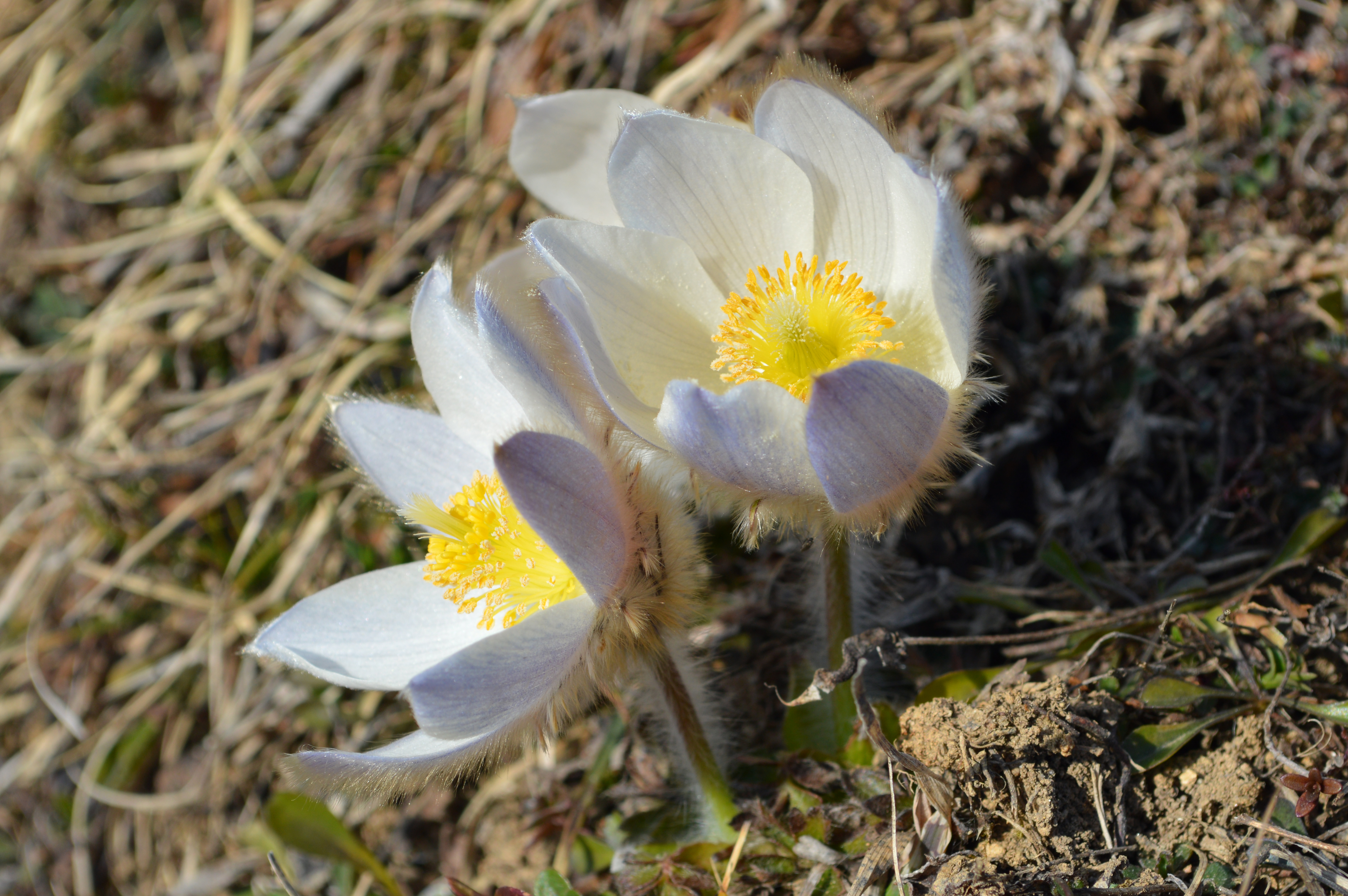

Conservation status
- Least Concern (IUCN 3.1)

Scientific classification
- Kingdom: Plantae
- Clade: Tracheophytes
- Clade: Angiosperms
- Clade: Eudicots
- Order: Ranunculales
- Family: Ranunculaceae
- Genus: Pulsatilla
- Species: P. vernalis

Binomial name
- Pulsatilla vernalis (L.) Mill.

= Pulsatilla vernalis =

Species of flowering plant

Pulsatilla vernalis (spring pasqueflower, arctic violet, lady of the snows) is a species of flowering plant in the family Ranunculaceae, native to mountainous habitats in Europe. Growing to 10 cm (4 in) high and wide, it is a semi-evergreen perennial with hairy, divided leaves. In early spring it bears anemone-like flowers which are up to 6 cm (2 in) in diameter, white flushed with violet on the outer surface of the petals, and prominent yellow stamens.

The specific epithet vernalis means "of spring".

In cultivation it is suitable for an alpine garden or alpine house, with sharply drained soil in full sun. Though very hardy it dislikes winter wetness. It has gained the Royal Horticultural Society's Award of Garden Merit.

It was the county flower of the former county Oppland, Norway, and was depicted in the county coat of arms. It is also the county flower of Härjedalen, Sweden and South Karelia, Finland.
