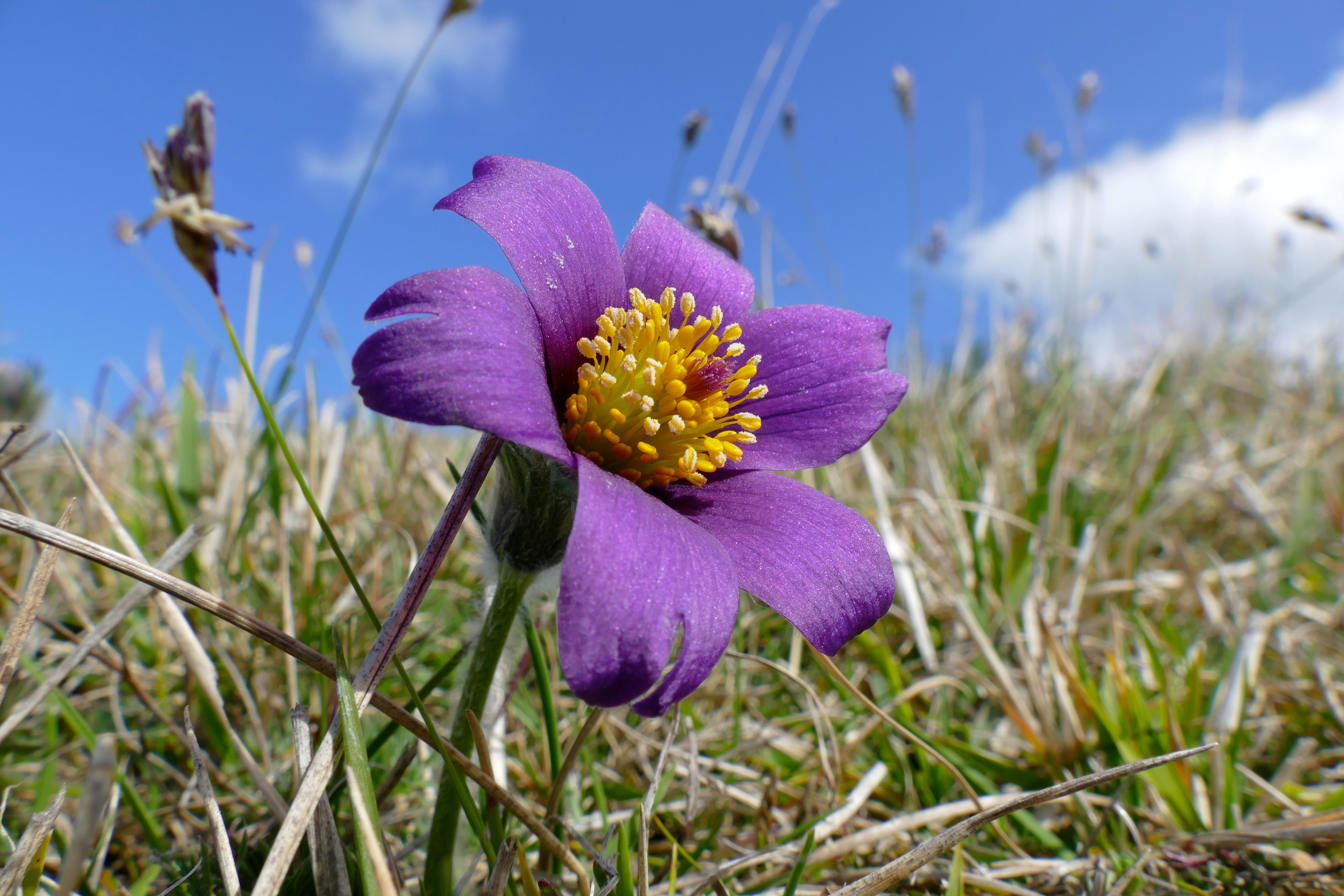
- Pulsatilla vulgaris

Scientific classification
- Kingdom: Plantae
- Clade: Embryophytes
- Clade: Tracheophytes
- Clade: Spermatophytes
- Clade: Angiosperms
- Clade: Eudicots
- Order: Ranunculales
- Family: Ranunculaceae
- Subfamily: Ranunculoideae
- Tribe: Anemoneae
- Genus: Pulsatilla; Mill.

Synonyms
- Anetilla Galushko; Miyakea Miyabe & Tatew.; Preonanthus Ehrh.

= Pulsatilla =

Genus of flowering plants in the buttercup family

Pulsatilla is a genus that contains about 40 species of herbaceous perennial plants native to meadows and prairies of North America, Europe, and Asia. Common names include pasque flower (or pasqueflower), wind flower, prairie crocus, Easter flower, and meadow anemone. Several species are valued ornamentals because of their finely-dissected leaves, solitary bell-shaped flowers, and plumed seed heads. The showy part of the flower consists of sepals, not petals.

The common name pasque flower refers to its flowering period in the spring during Passover (in Biblical Hebrew: פֶּסַח pāsaḥ).

== Taxonomy ==
The genus Pulsatilla was first formally named in 1754 by the English botanist Philip Miller. The type species is Pulsatilla vulgaris, the European pasque flower. The genus is placed in the tribe Anemoneae within the family Ranunculaceae. The tribe has been shown repeatedly to be monophyletic in molecular phylogenetic studies, but the number of genera recognized within the tribe and their relationship has varied. Multiple studies have shown that Pulsatilla forms a monophyletic group, but the rank assigned to the group has differed. In one approach, Pulsatilla is treated as a section within a more broadly circumscribed Anemone. In another approach, molecular phylogenetic evidence is used to separate Pulsatilla from Anemone as a separate genus, dividing it into three subgenera. Morphologically, Pulsatilla can be distinguished from Anemone by the long hairy beak on the achenes formed by the persistent style and stamens. Pulsatilla species can also be distinguished by DNA barcoding. As of March 2024, many sources, such as Plants of the World Online and the Flora of Korea, support the treatment of Pulsatilla as a distinct genus.

=== Species ===
The Pasque flower: Fred Rumsey, Botanist, The Natural History Museum.

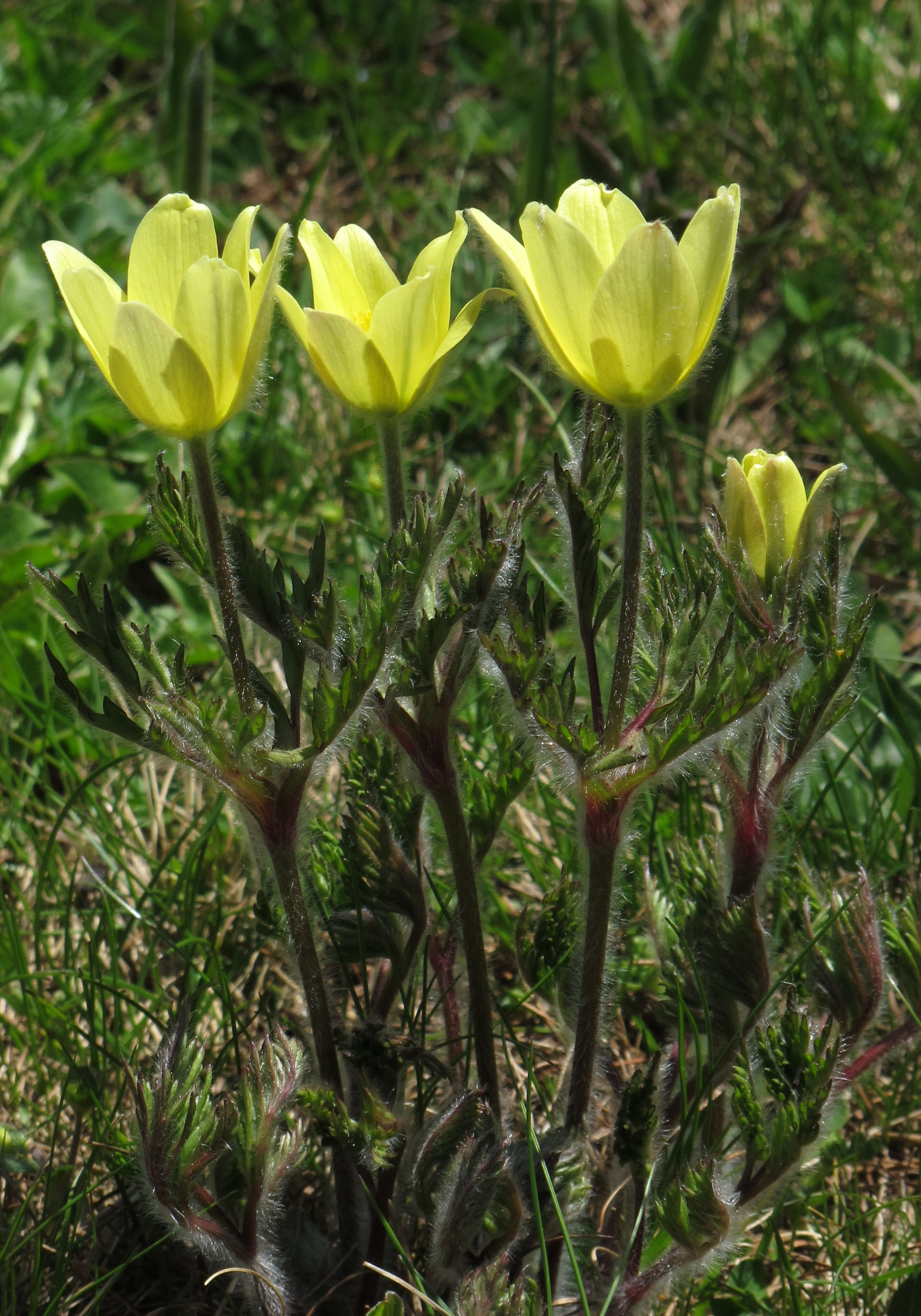
Pulsatilla alpina subsp. apiifolia

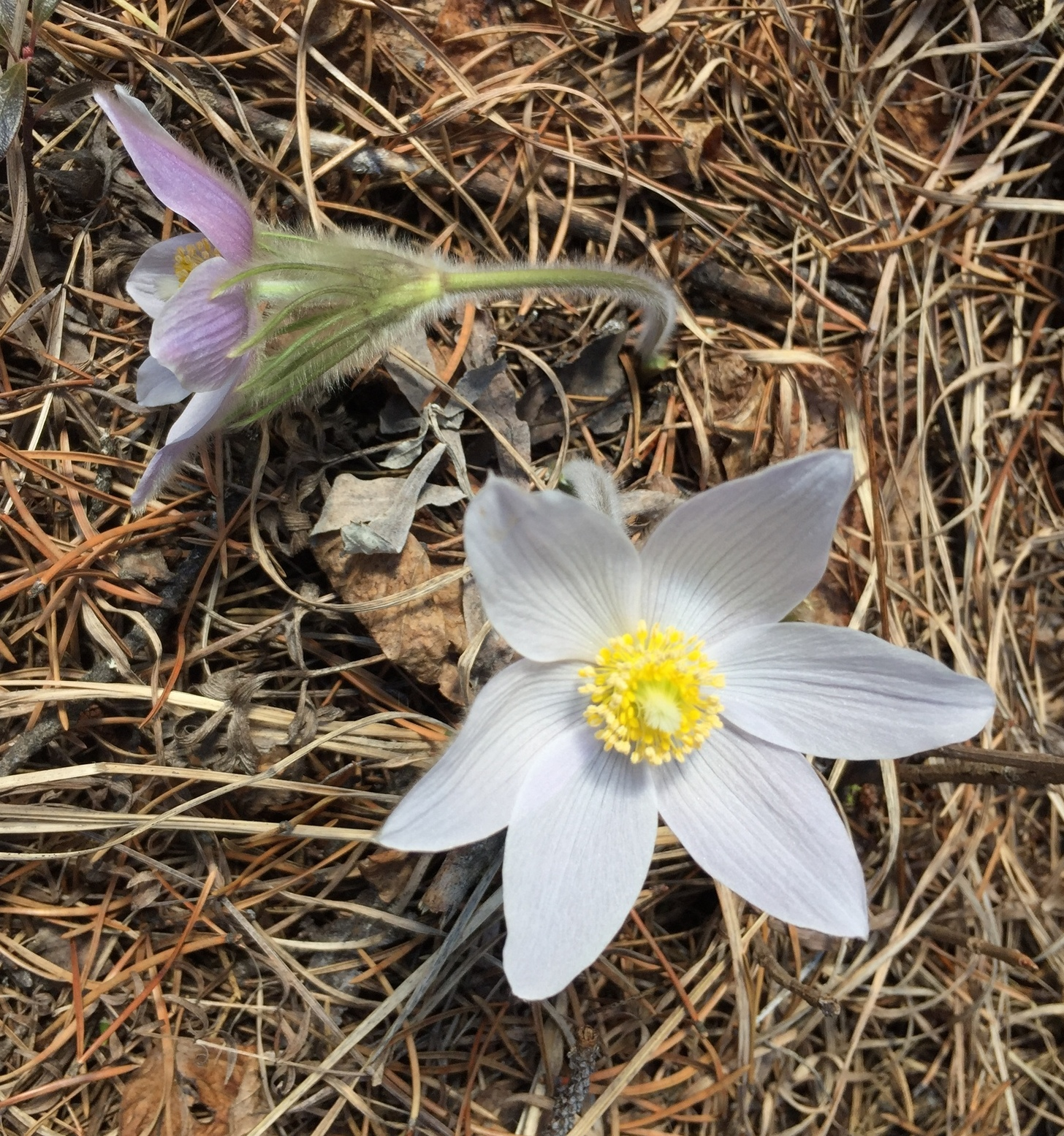
Pulsatilla nuttalliana

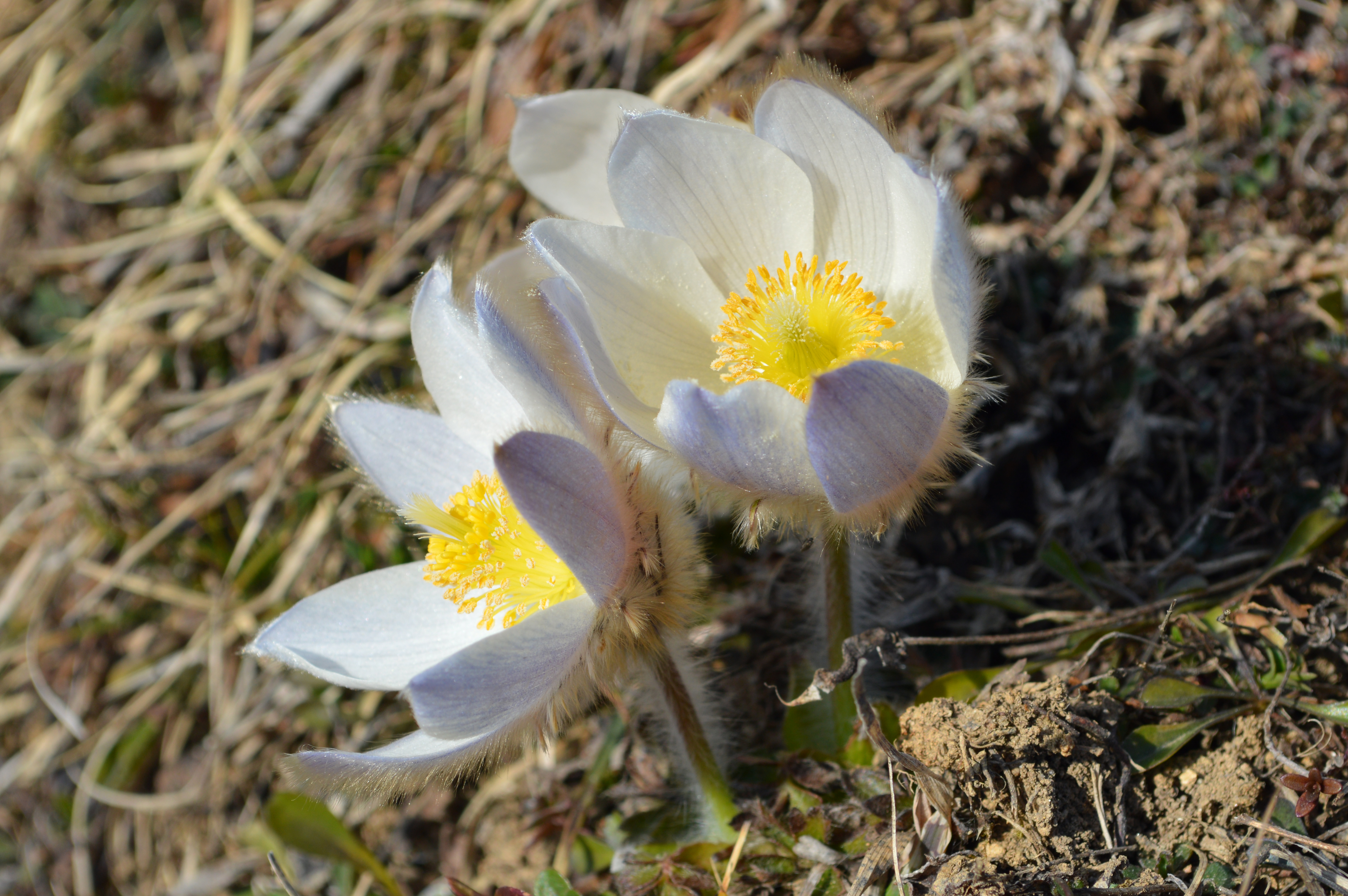
Pulsatilla vernalis

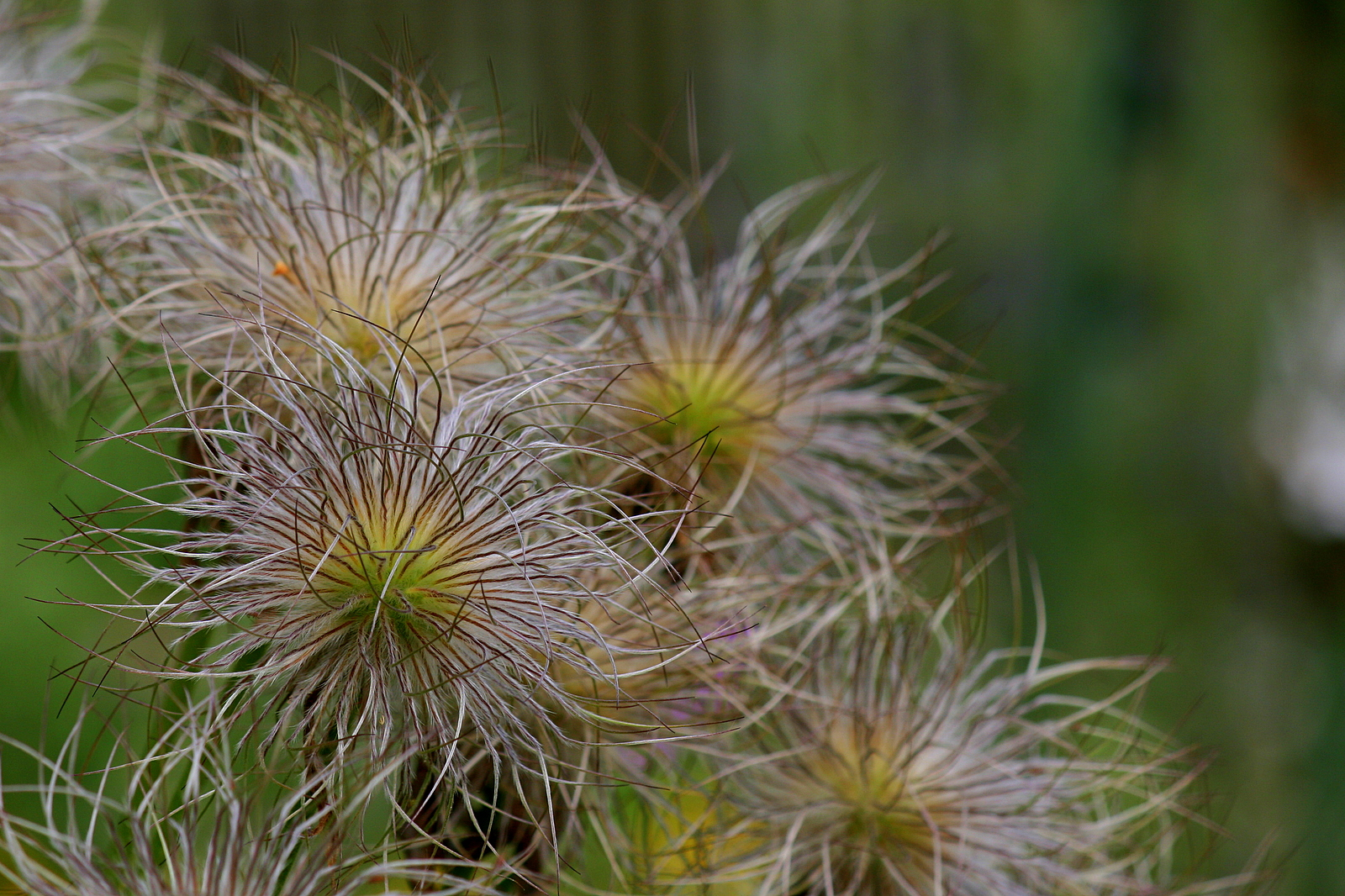
Pulsatilla vulgaris fruit

As of March 2024, Plants of the World Online listed the following species in the genus Pulsatilla:

- Pulsatilla ajanensis Regel & Tiling
- Pulsatilla albana (Steven) Bercht. & J.Presl
- Pulsatilla alpina (L.) Delarbre
- Pulsatilla ambigua (Turcz. ex Hayek) Zämelis & Paegle
- Pulsatilla armena (Boiss.) Rupr.
- Pulsatilla aurea (Sommier & Levier) Juz.
- Pulsatilla bungeana C.A.Mey.
- Pulsatilla campanella (Regel & Tiling) Fisch. ex Krylov
- Pulsatilla cernua (Thunb.) Bercht. & J.Presl
- Pulsatilla chinensis (Bunge) Regel
- Pulsatilla dahurica (Fisch. ex DC.) Spreng.
- Pulsatilla georgica Rupr.
- Pulsatilla grandis Wender.
- Pulsatilla halleri (All.) Willd.
- Pulsatilla herba-somnii Stepanov
- Pulsatilla hulunensis (L.Q.Zhao) L.Q.Zhao & Y.Z.Zhao
- Pulsatilla integrifolia (Miyabe & Tatew.) Tatew. & Ohwi ex Vorosch.
- Pulsatilla kostyczewii (Korsh.) Juz.
- Pulsatilla magadanensis A.P.Khokhr. & Vorosch.
- Pulsatilla millefolia (Hemsl. & E.H.Wilson) Ulbr.
- Pulsatilla montana (Hoppe) Rchb.
- Pulsatilla multiceps Greene
- Pulsatilla nipponica (H.Takeda) Ohwi
- Pulsatilla nivalis Nakai
- Pulsatilla nuttalliana (DC.) Spreng.
- Pulsatilla occidentalis (S.Watson) Freyn
- Pulsatilla orientali-sibirica Stepanov
- Pulsatilla patens (L.) Mill.
- Pulsatilla pratensis (L.) Mill.
- Pulsatilla reverdattoi Polozhij & A.T.Malzeva
- Pulsatilla rubra (Lam.) Delarbre
- Pulsatilla sachalinensis H.Hara
- Pulsatilla saxatilis L.Xu & T.G.Kang
- Pulsatilla scherfelii (Ullep.) Skalický
- Pulsatilla sukaczewii Juz.
- Pulsatilla taraoi (Makino) Zämelis & Paegle
- Pulsatilla tatewakii Kudô
- Pulsatilla tenuiloba (Turcz.) Juz.
- Pulsatilla tongkangensis Y.N.Lee & T.C.Lee
- Pulsatilla turczaninovii Krylov & Serg.
- Pulsatilla usensis Stepanov
- Pulsatilla vernalis (L.) Mill.
- Pulsatilla violacea Rupr.
- Pulsatilla vulgaris Mill.
- Pulsatilla wallichiana (Royle) Ulbr.
- Pulsatilla zimmermannii Soó

Plants of the World Online also listed a number of named hybrids:

- Pulsatilla × bolzanensis Murr
- Pulsatilla × celakovskyana Domin
- Pulsatilla × emiliana (F.O.Wolf) Beauverd
- Pulsatilla × gayeri Simonk.
- Pulsatilla × girodii (Rouy) P.Fourn.
- Pulsatilla × hackelii Pohl
- Pulsatilla × knappii (Palez.) Palez.
- Pulsatilla × mixta Halácsy
- Pulsatilla × weberi (Widder) Janch. ex Holub
- Pulsatilla × wilczekii (F.O.Wolf ex Hegi) P.Fourn.
- Pulsatilla × yanbianensis H.Z.Lv

== Cultural significance ==
Pulsatilla nuttalliana (as the synonym P. patens) is the provincial flower of Manitoba, Canada and (as the synonym P. hirsutissima) the state flower of the US state of South Dakota. Pulsatilla vulgaris is the County flower for both Hertfordshire and Cambridgeshire in England. Pulsatilla vernalis is the county flower of Oppland, Norway. The UK has introduced the UK biodiversity action plan to address the 49% decline in wild Pulsatilla species.

== Use and toxicity ==
Pulsatilla is a toxic plant. Misuse can lead to diarrhea, vomiting and convulsions, hypotension, and coma. It has been used as a medicine by Native Americans for centuries. Blackfoot Indians used it to induce abortions and childbirth. Pulsatilla should not be taken during pregnancy nor during lactation.

Extracts of Pulsatilla have been used to treat reproductive problems such as premenstrual syndrome and epididymitis. Additional applications of plant extracts include uses as a sedative and for treating coughs.
