= Phyllonorycter koreana =

Scientific classification
- Kingdom: Animalia
- Phylum: Arthropoda
- Class: Insecta
- Order: Lepidoptera
- Family: Gracillariidae
- Genus: Phyllonorycter
- Species: P. koreana

Binomial name
- Phyllonorycter koreana Kumata & Park, 1978

Species of moth

Phyllonorycter koreana is a moth of the family Gracillariidae. It is known from Korea.

The wingspan is 6-7.8 mm.
