= Koreana =

Koreana may refer to:

- Koreana (band), a South Korean band
- Koreana (TV series), a Filipino drama series produced by GMA Network
- Koreana Hotel (Seoul), a skyscraper and hotel in Seoul
- Koreana (magazine), a cultural quarterly magazine

== See also ==
- Tripitaka Koreana, a Korean collection of the Tripitaka (Buddhist scriptures) carved in the 13th century
