= Pterotopteryx koreana =

Scientific classification
- Domain: Eukaryota
- Kingdom: Animalia
- Phylum: Arthropoda
- Class: Insecta
- Order: Lepidoptera
- Family: Alucitidae
- Genus: Pterotopteryx
- Species: P. koreana

Binomial name
- Pterotopteryx koreana Byun, 2006

Species of moth

Pterotopteryx koreana is a moth of the family Alucitidae. It was described by Bong-Kyu Byun in 2006 and is endemic to Gangwon Province, South Korea, Korea.
