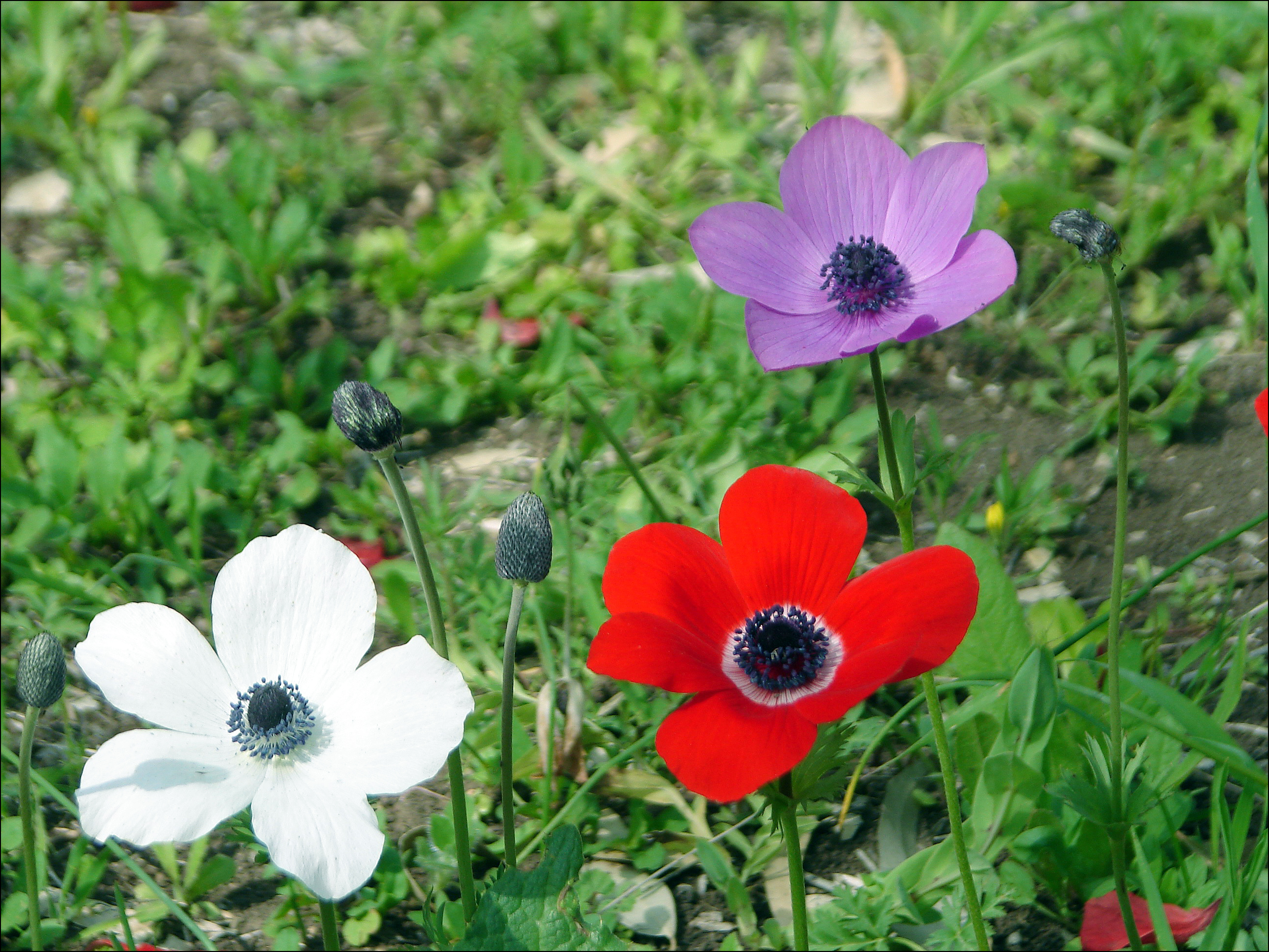
- Anemone coronaria

Scientific classification
- Kingdom: Plantae
- Clade: Tracheophytes
- Clade: Angiosperms
- Clade: Eudicots
- Order: Ranunculales
- Family: Ranunculaceae
- Subfamily: Ranunculoideae
- Tribe: Anemoneae; DC.

Genera
- see text

= Anemoneae =

Tribe of flowering plants

Anemoneae is an accepted tribe of the subfamily Ranunculoideae.

== Genera ==
- Anemonastrum
- Anemone
- Anemonoides
- Archiclematis
- Barneoudia
- Clematis
- Eriocapitella
- Hepatica
- Knowltonia
- Metanemone
- Naravelia
- Oreithales
- Pulsatilla
