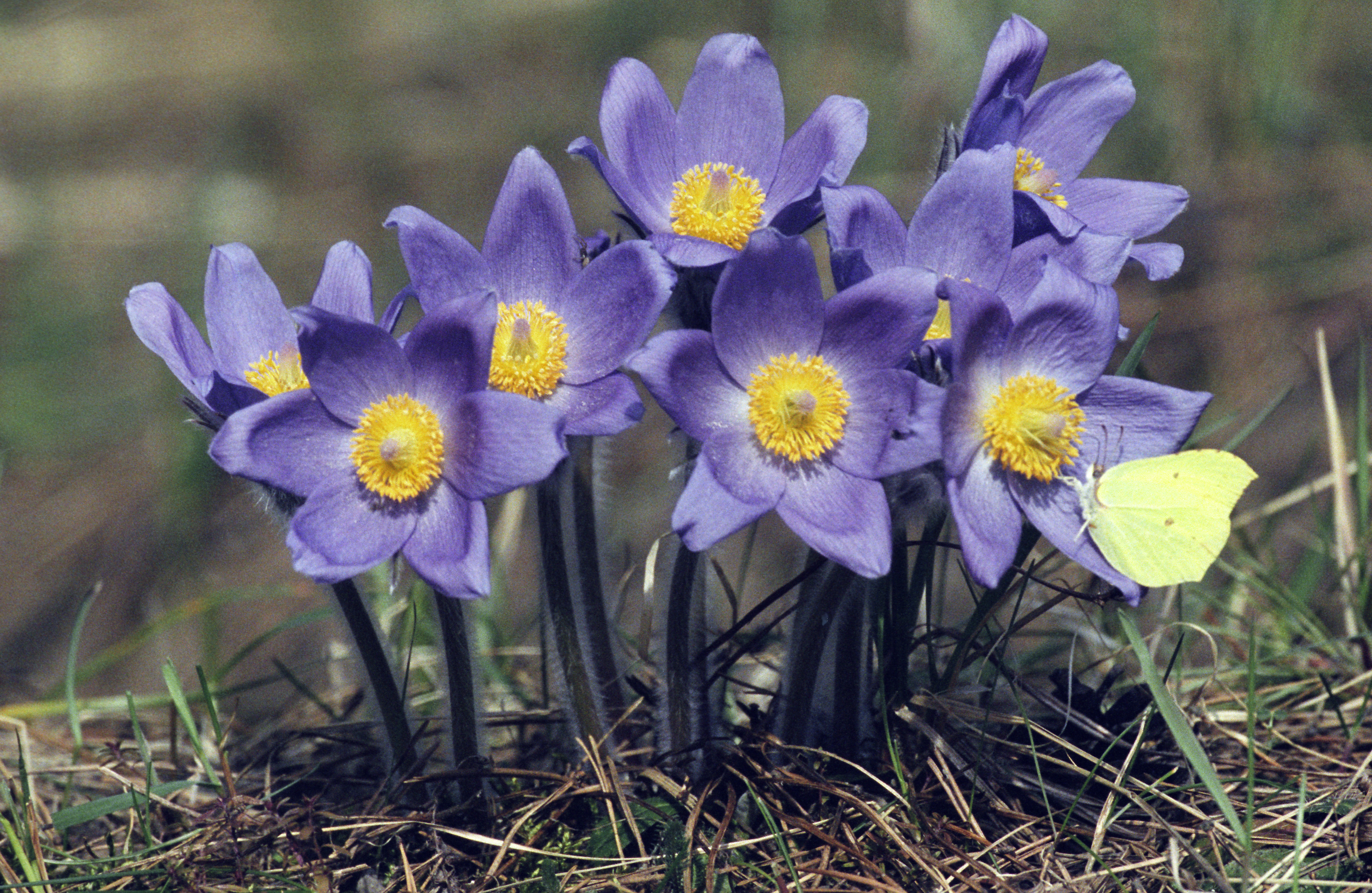
- In Poland

Scientific classification
- Kingdom: Plantae
- Clade: Tracheophytes
- Clade: Angiosperms
- Clade: Eudicots
- Order: Ranunculales
- Family: Ranunculaceae
- Genus: Pulsatilla
- Species: P. patens

Binomial name
- Pulsatilla patens (L.) Mill.

Synonyms
- List: Anemone bauhini Tausch; Anemone longipetala Schleich. ex Steud.; Anemone nuttallii Nutt.; Anemone patens L.; Anemone patens var. pinnatifolia Wilensky; Anemone patens var. rosea Cockerell; Pulsatilla bauhini Tausch ex Pritz.; Pulsatilla kioviensis Wissjul. Pulsatilla patens f. albiflora; X.F.Zhao ex Y.Z.Zhao Pulsatilla patens var. kioviensis; (Wissjul.) Tzvelev Pulsatilla pseudopatens; Schur Pulsatilla uralensis; (Zämelis) Tzvelev

= Pulsatilla patens =

Species of flowering plant

Pulsatilla patens is a species of flowering plant in the family Ranunculaceae, native to Europe, Russia, Mongolia, and China. Common names include Eastern pasqueflower and cutleaf anemone.

== Taxonomy ==
It was first formally named in 1753 as Anemone patens and is sometimes still considered part of that genus. The species Pulsatilla nuttalliana, the pasqueflower native to much of North America, is sometimes considered a subspecies or variety of Pulsatilla patens.

Two subspecies are accepted:

- Pulsatilla patens subsp. patens
- Pulsatilla patens subsp. multifida (Pritz.) Zämelis

== Cultural associations ==
Pulsatilla patens is the regional flower of the region of Kanta-Häme in Finland.

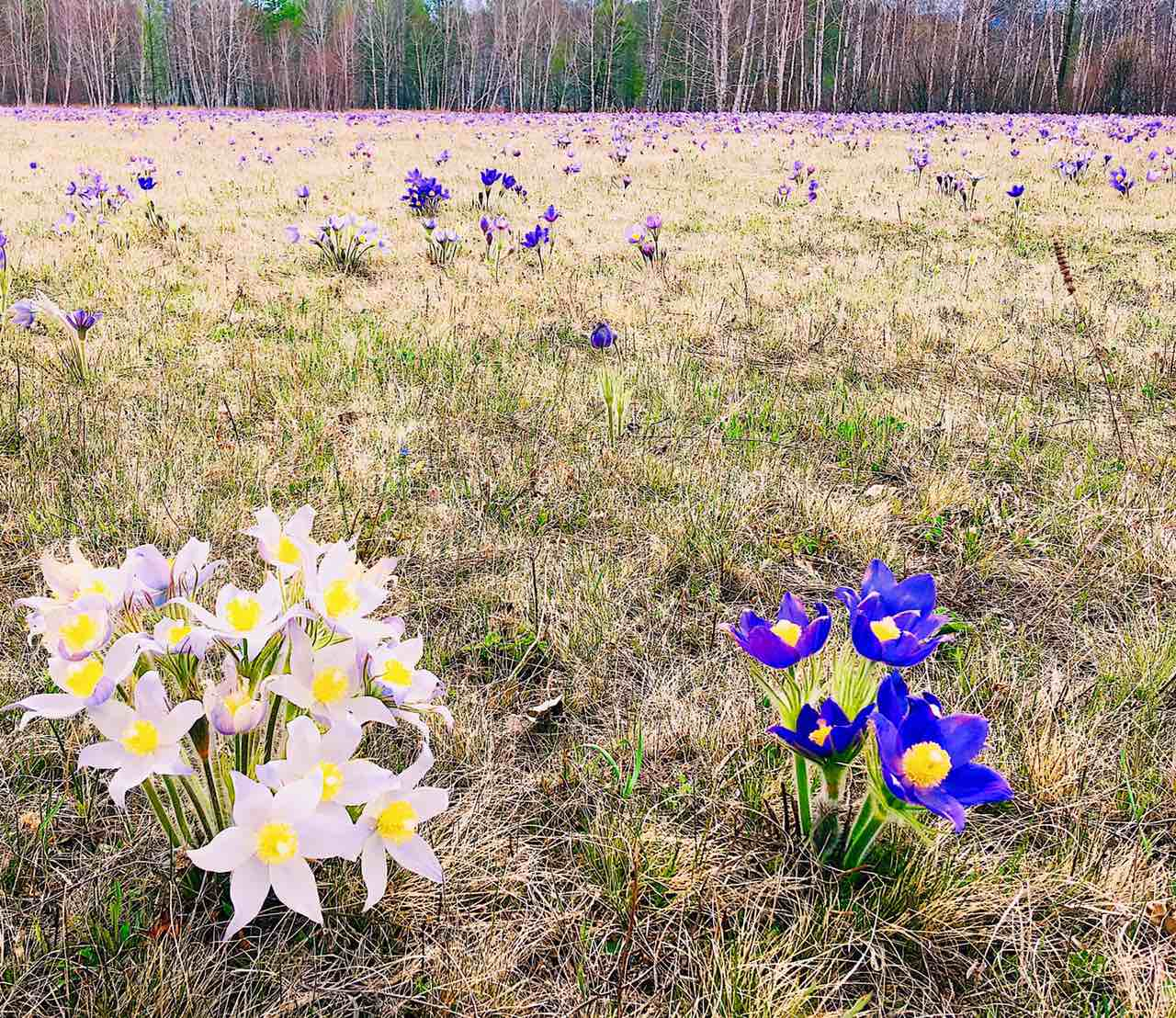
In Buryatia, Russia

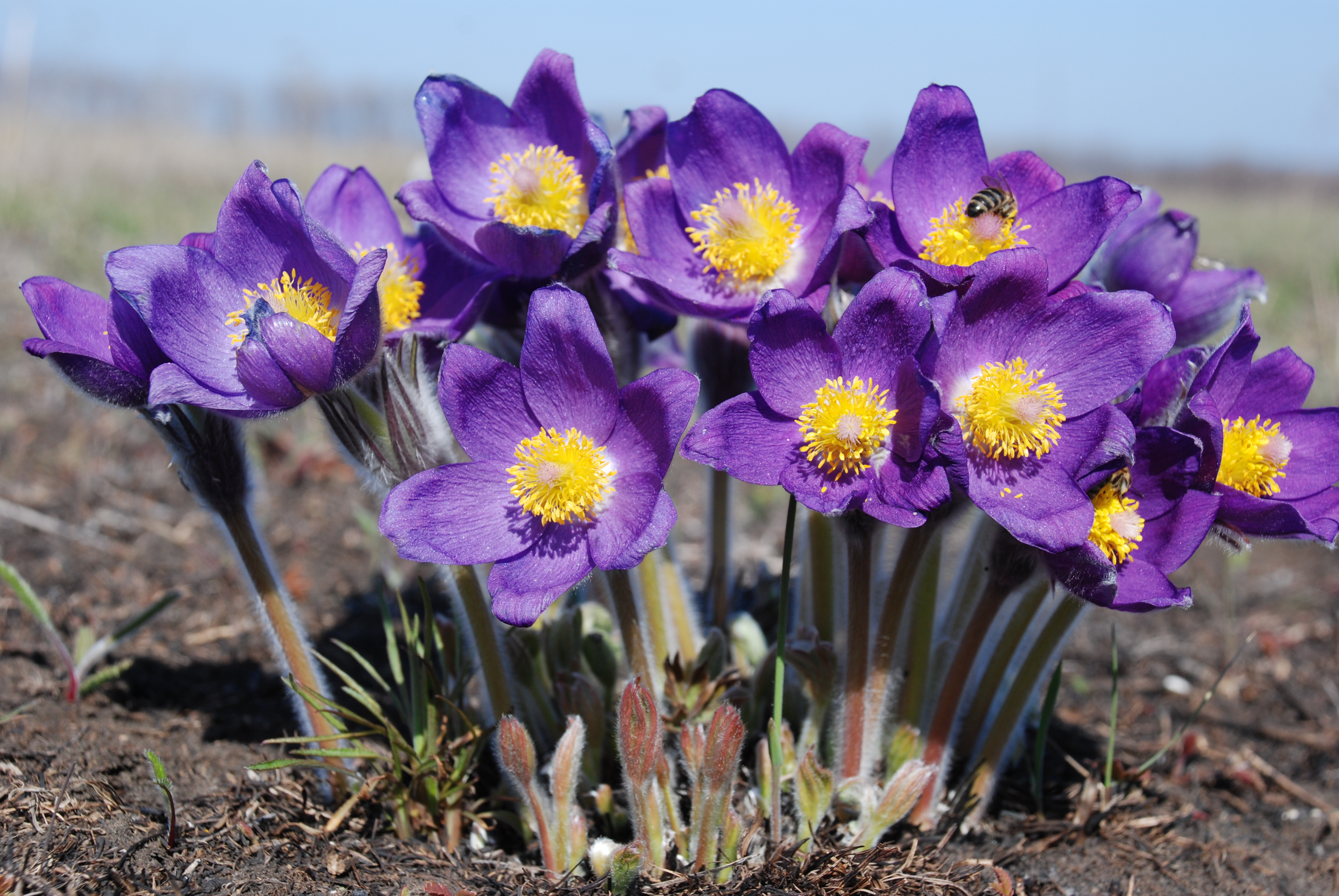
In Ukraine
