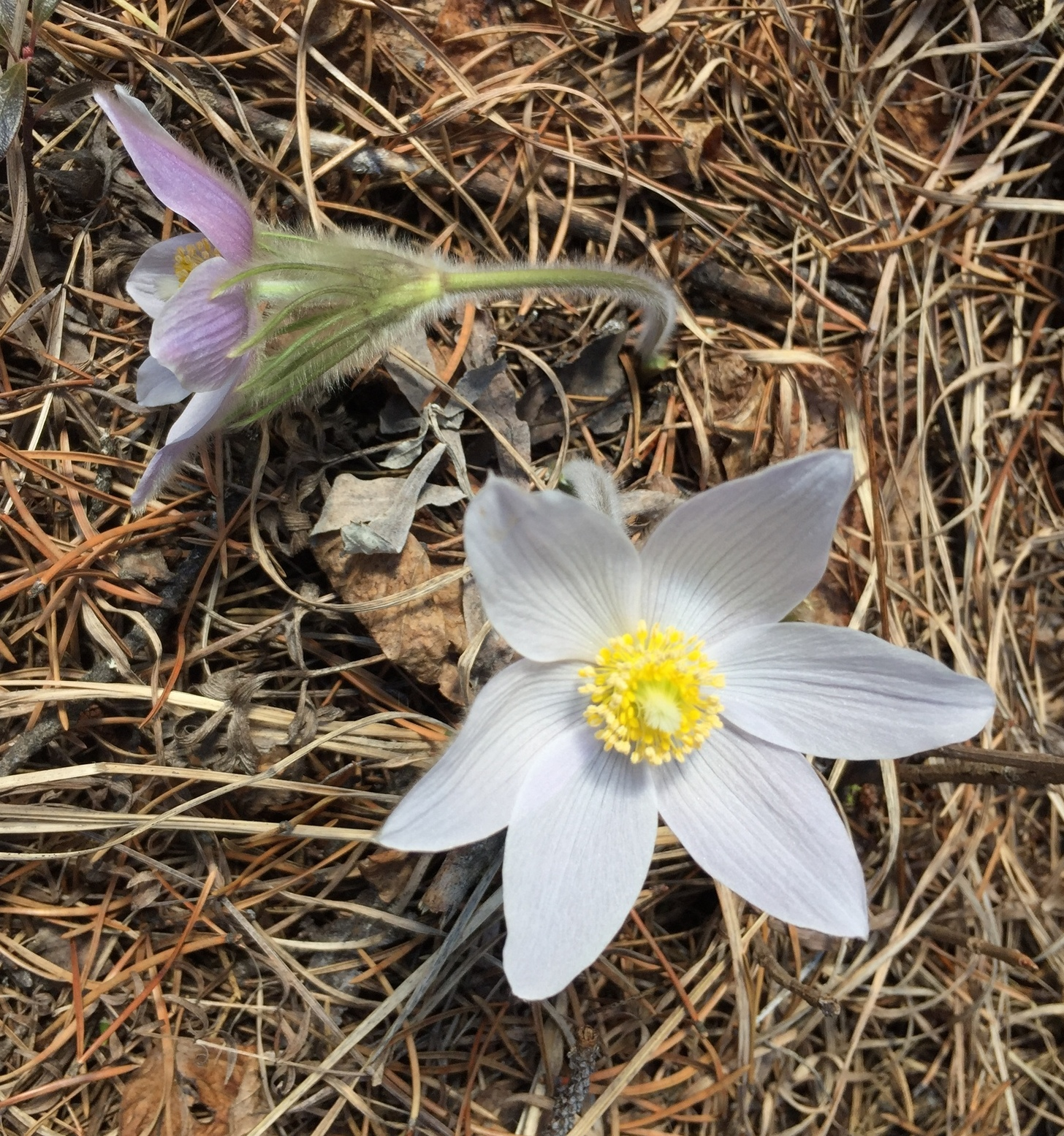
- In Manitoba, Canada

Conservation status
- Secure (NatureServe)

Scientific classification
- Kingdom: Plantae
- Clade: Tracheophytes
- Clade: Angiosperms
- Clade: Eudicots
- Order: Ranunculales
- Family: Ranunculaceae
- Genus: Pulsatilla
- Species: P. nuttalliana

Binomial name
- Pulsatilla nuttalliana (DC.) Bercht. & J.Presl

Synonyms
- Anemone nuttalliana DC.; Anemone patens var. nuttalliana (DC.) A.Gray; Anemone patens var. rosea Cockerell; Pulsatilla hirsutissima var. rosea Daniels; Pulsatilla ludoviciana f. glabrata A.E.Porsild; Pulsatilla patens subsp. nuttalliana (DC.) ined.

= Pulsatilla nuttalliana =

Species of flowering plant

Pulsatilla nuttalliana, known as American pasqueflower, prairie pasqueflower, prairie crocus, or simply pasqueflower, is a flowering plant native to much of North America, from the western side of Lake Michigan, to northern Canada in the Northwest Territories, south to New Mexico in the southwestern United States. Pasqueflower is the provincial flower of Manitoba and the state flower of South Dakota.

== Description ==
The flowers of Pulsatilla nuttalliana develop before their foliage, blooming while the leaves are just beginning to emerge. The stalk supporting the flower can be quite fuzzy or nearly smooth in texture, but never completely hairless. A ring of three very divided bracts, surround the flowering stalk below the flower head. They are very dissimilar to the leaves. Each flower is at the end of a separate stalk, but each plant may have many flowers or a single bloom. The flowers have five to eight sepals of a lavender or blue purple color, and sometimes pale or nearly white in color. Plants that have higher numbers of sepals on flowers will usually revert to having the more common six in future years. The petals are oblong to elliptic in shape. The flowers resemble upward facing bells and are 20–40 mm long. The center of the flower is bright yellow with a mound of 150–200 stamens surrounding the many styles. The blooming period of P. nutalliana is very early, the flowers often emerging as soon as the snow melts and then being snowed upon again. The flowers will close up during colder weather and reopen during warmer periods.

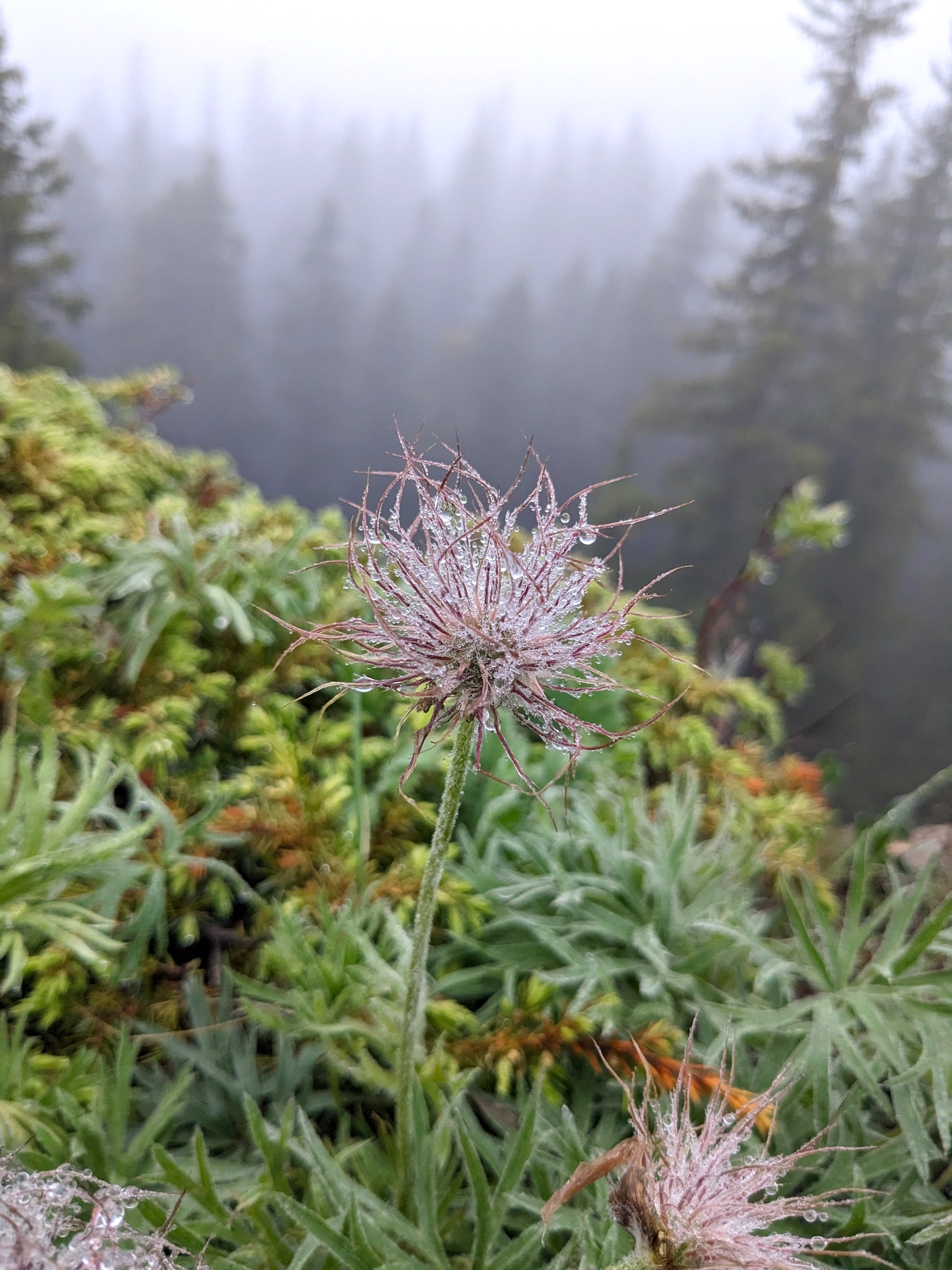
Pulsatilla nuttalliana with seed head in Cypress Hills Provincial Park, Alberta

After blooming the fertilized flowers will develop dry fruits called achenes with a feather like "tail" 20–40 mm long formed from the growing styles. Fertilized styles turn from being whitish to pink or pink-brown in color. Each achene contains a single seed. The overall appearance of the seed head is like a shaggy ball of threads. The stalk continues to grow leaving the ring of bracts much lower down and putting the seeds well above the leaves. Flowers may set seeds through cross-pollination or self-pollination, though to encourage outcrossing the flowers exhibit protogyny, where the female parts develop before the male.

Pulsatilla nuttalliana is herbaceous perennial plant that grows 5–40 cm in height, rarely to 60 cm when full grown. Its stems are soft and covered in short, fine hairs. The basal leaves are divided into three parts (ternately compound) with each leaflet also subdivided so the end segments are 2–4 mm wide. The end leaflet will have a very short stalk attaching it to the leaf stem or almost no stem at all (petiolulate to nearly sessile). The whole of the leaf is 3–5 cm wide, or rarely as little as 2.5 cm, with a teardrop or obovate outline.

The plant grows from a substantial underground tap root and may also reproduce vegetatively by producing new rosettes from its vertically branched roots.

== Taxonomy ==
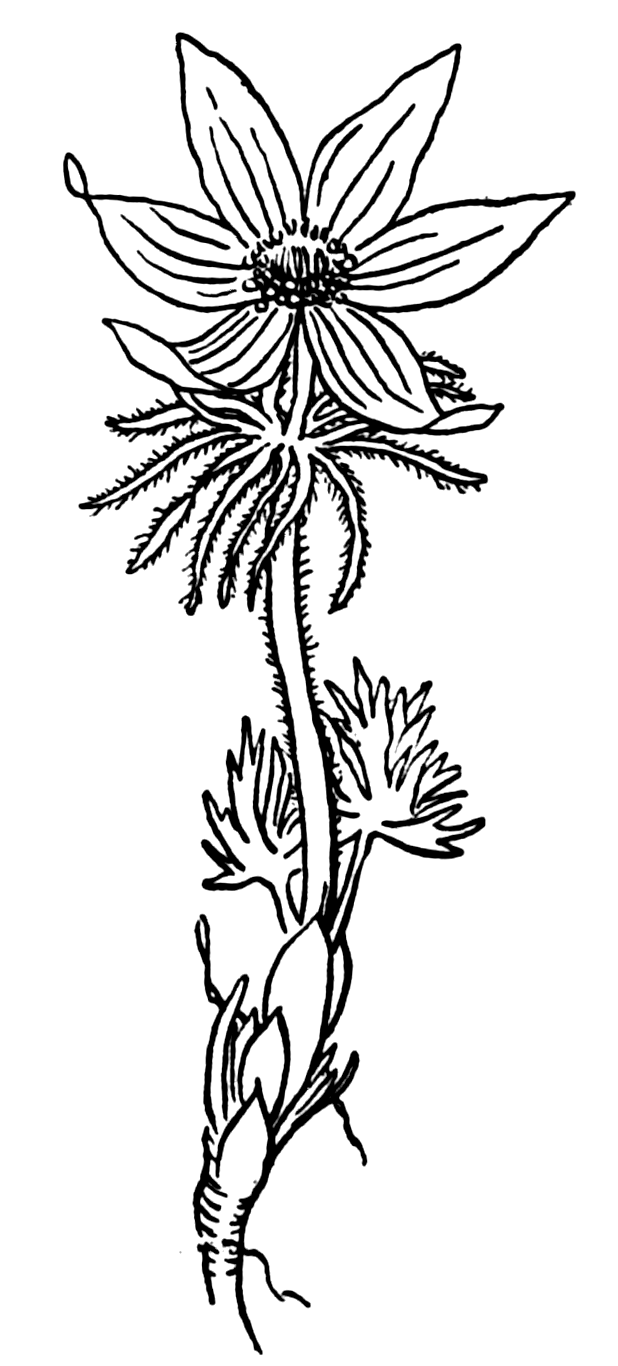
Illustration from Our Early Wild Flowers by Harriet L. Keeler, 1916 drawn by Mary Keffer

It was first formally named in 1817 as Anemone nuttalliana by Augustin Pyramus de Candolle in Regni vegetabilis systema naturale. In 1823 it was reclassified as Pulsatilla nuttalliana by Friedrich von Berchtold and Jan Svatopluk Presl in O Prirozenosti Rostlin aneb rostlinar.

Currently, along with the other species in Pulsatilla it is classified in Ranunculaceae, commonly known as the buttercup or crowfoot family.

As of 2024 it is considered a full species as Pulsatilla nuttalliana by Plants of the World Online (POWO) and by the Database of Canadian Vascular Plants (VASCAN). It is considered a subspecies or variety of Pulsatilla patens as var. multifida by World Flora Online (WFO) and the USDA Natural Resources Conservation Service PLANTS database (PLANTS). It is also considered a subspecies as Anemone patens var. multifida by Flora of North America (FNA). The argument against inclusion of species like Pulsatilla nuttalliana in genus Anemone are that the genetic relationships would also require the inclusion of many other well recognized genera.

=== Names ===
The common names "pasque flower" or variations like "western pasque flower" are very often used in English for this species, a reference to its blooming close to the time of Easter. In Canada it is called "prairie crocus" for the general resemblance of its flowers to that of the true crocus. Older common names used prior to the 1920s for the species include "hartshorn-plant", "gosling", "prairie smoke", and simply "crocus".

In the Dakota language it is called "hokski-chekpa wahcha" (twin flower). In Lakota it is "hoksi' cekpa" (child's navel) as a reference to the similar appearance of the flower's bud to a new born's navel when healing. In their own language people of the Blackfeet Nation call it "Napi" (old man) for the gray silky heads.

== Habitat and distribution ==
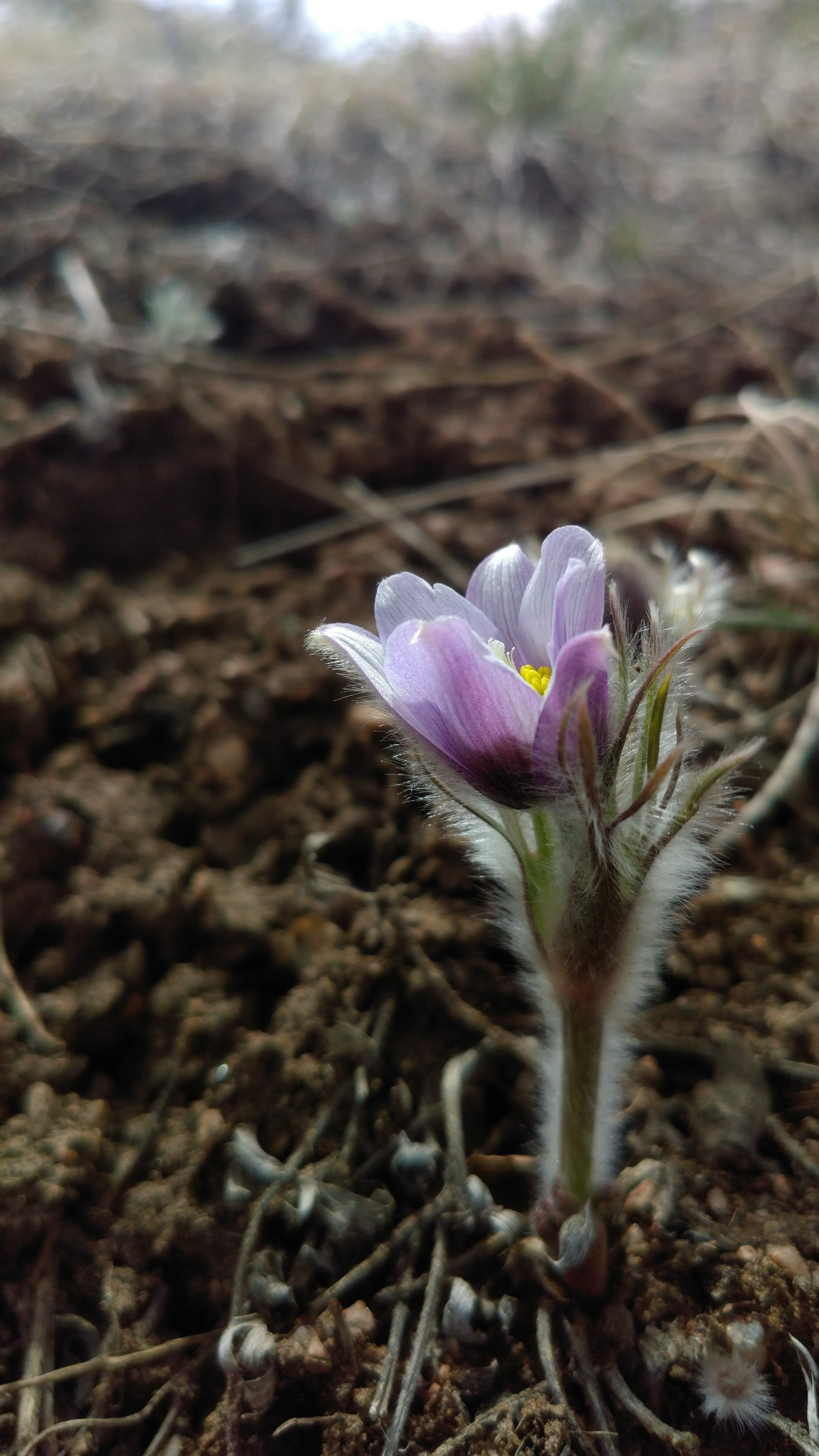
Pasqueflower growing in Colorado

The natural habitats of Pulsatilla nuttalliana include cool northern prairies, open slopes, fescue grasslands, granite outcrops in forests, and woodlands that are dry and open in montane and boreal areas. They will also grow in human created habitats like clearcut areas, roadsides, and the edges of gravel pits.

Pulsatilla nuttalliana is widely distributed in North America from Alaska in the United States and Nunavut in Canada to Ontario and all the western provinces. In the United States they grow from Idaho to Wisconsin and south to Utah, Colorado, and parts of New Mexico. This area encompasses all of the upper Midwestern states and the Southern and Northern Rocky Mountains.

Its global status is recorded as globally secure by NatureServe, but they also treat it as a subspecies rather than as a full species. It is assessed as critically imperiled in Washington, Illinois, and Ontario.

== Ecology ==
Pulsatilla nuttalliana is cross-pollinated by many insects including honeybees, solitary mining bees in andrenidae, bumblebees, and hover flies. Its seeds are distributed by the wind or by the catching in the fur of passing animals.

The forage value to herbivores is low as the plant is mildly toxic due to protoanemonin content. When grazed it will produce new leaves from dormant buds. The numbers of Pulsatilla nuttalliana plants increase in heavily grazed meadows. It is adapted to habitat disturbances including wildfires. However, its seeds do not significantly persist in the soil.

== Cultivation ==
The prairie pasqueflower is rarely grown in gardens as an ornamental flower and is frequently confused with the commonly-grown European species, Pulsatilla vulgaris. However, it is useful as an ornamental, particularly for those interested in North American native species. They are somewhat more often planted in gardens intended to resemble an Upper Midwest prairie or in rock gardens and for its forage value to bees in the spring.

Fresh seed of Pulsatilla species, including of Pulsatilla nuttalliana, germinates readily without stratification or pretreatment in about 3 weeks or slightly more. Seed that has been dry-stored for some months will require a cool moist stratification for 60 days and then sprout at temperatures of 18 to 21°C. The seeds do not keep well and should be immediately planted or stored in cool dry conditions. Pasqueflowers are also propagated vegetatively for gardens or habitat restoration by taking 2–4 cm root cuttings and planting them in well drained potting mediums. Seedlings are difficult to transplant, and the transplantation of all plant sizes is dependent on avoiding root disturbance by digging with a substantial amount of soil.

Good drainage is of critical importance for the health of prairie pasqueflower plants grown in gardens. They grow best in soils that are moist to dry with a neutral to slightly alkaline characteristic (7.0 to 8.0 soil pH) and winter snow cover. They are known to be winter hardy in USDA zones 3–5. Unlike some wildflowers they grow well with some additional compost in the topsoil around 7 centimeters in depth. In areas with hot summers plants are less stressed with partial to half-day shade. In areas with cool summers such as mountain habitats and the northern prairies full sun is required.
