= Anemone jamesonii =

Conservation status
- Endangered (IUCN 3.1)

Scientific classification
- Kingdom: Plantae
- Clade: Tracheophytes
- Clade: Angiosperms
- Clade: Eudicots
- Order: Ranunculales
- Family: Ranunculaceae
- Genus: Anemone
- Species: A. jamesonii

Binomial name
- Anemone jamesonii Hook.

Species of flowering plant

Anemone jamesonii is a species of plant in the family Ranunculaceae. It is endemic to Ecuador.
