= Thimbleweed =

Thimbleweed is the common name of any of several plants with seed heads resembling a thimble.

Species called thimbleweed include:

- Rudbeckia laciniata
- Anemone cylindrica
- Anemone hupehensis
- Anemone nemorosa
- Anemone virginiana

Thimbleweed may also refer to:

- Thimbleweed Park, a 2017 video game by Ron Gilbert and Gary Winnick
