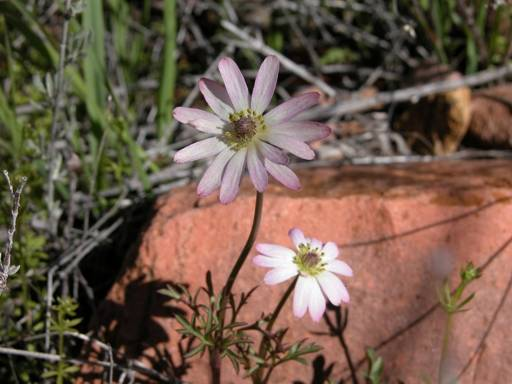

Scientific classification
- Kingdom: Plantae
- Clade: Embryophytes
- Clade: Tracheophytes
- Clade: Spermatophytes
- Clade: Angiosperms
- Clade: Eudicots
- Order: Ranunculales
- Family: Ranunculaceae
- Genus: Anemone
- Species: A. tuberosa

Binomial name
- Anemone tuberosa Rydb.

= Anemone tuberosa =

Species of flowering plant in the buttercup family

Anemone tuberosa, the desert anemone or tuber anemone, is a herbaceous species of flowering plant in the buttercup family Ranunculaceae. Plants grow 10 to 30, sometimes 40 cm (16 in) tall, from a woody-like tuber shaped like a caudex. Plants have 1 to 3 basal leaves that are 1 or 2 times ternate. The few basal leaves have long petioles and are deeply 3-parted with leaflets lacking stems or rarely with a stalk. Plants flowering early to late spring with the flowers composed of 8 to 10 sepals normally white or pink colored, 10 to 14 mm (0.39 to 0.55 in) long. The plants produce one peduncle with one solitary flower or 2–5 flowered cymes. Fruits in heads fusiform in shape, with 7–20 cm (2.8–7.9 in) long pedicels. Fruits called achenes measure 2.5 to 3.5 mm (0.098 to 0.138 in) long and 2 to 2.5 mm (0.079 to 0.098 in) wide with a rounded outline and flat in shape, densely woolly, not winged also with straight 1.5 mm (0.059 in) long beaks.

Anemone tuberosa is native to south, central and western North America, mostly in Nevada and New Mexico and Northern Mexico but also west to California and East to Texas. This spring flowering plant is found on rocky slopes and along stream banks. Anemone tuberosa is part of a species complex that includes 6 to 9 species native from south western and central USA to South America. For the most part all produce tubers or caudex-like tubers.
