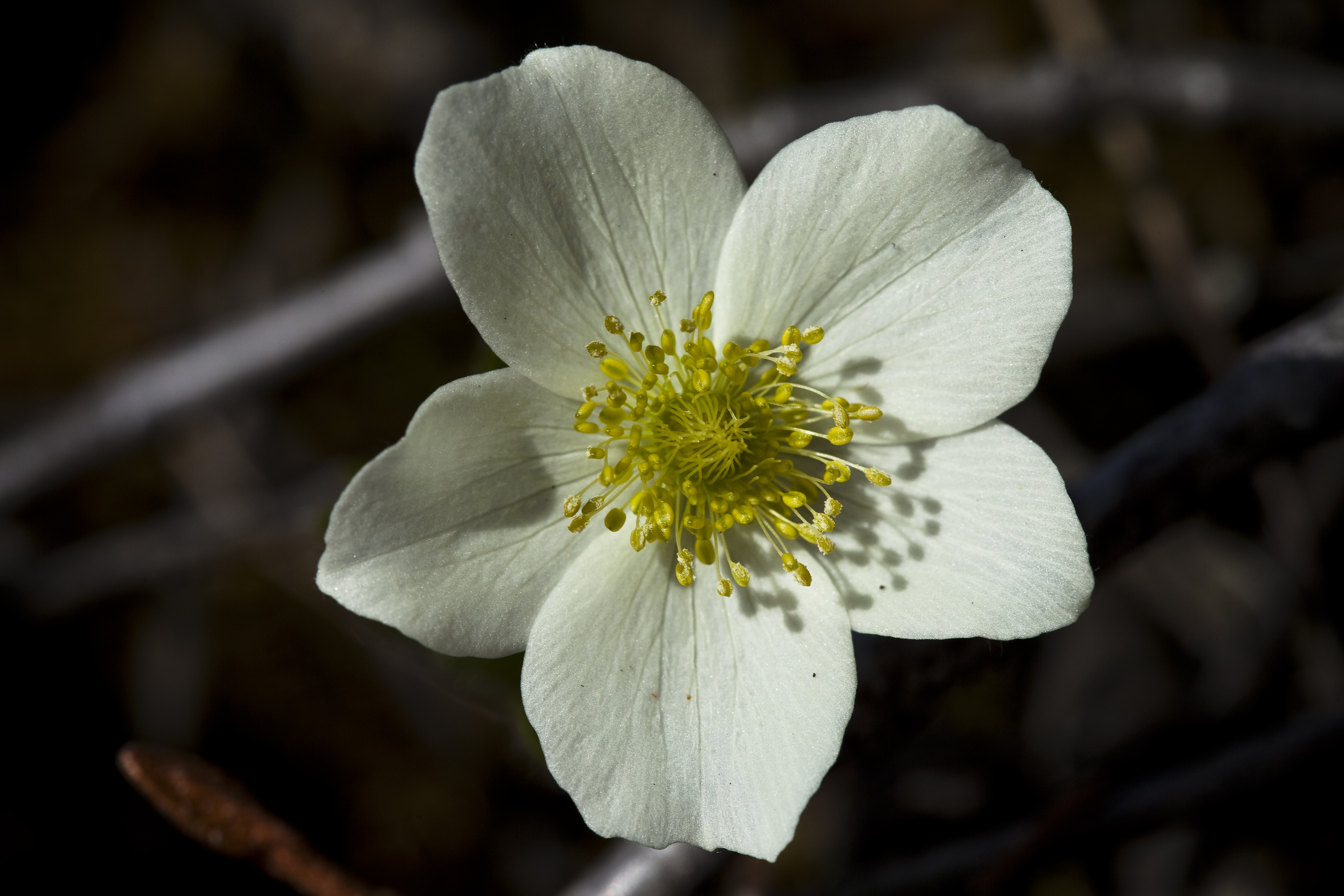

Conservation status
- Secure (NatureServe)

Scientific classification
- Kingdom: Plantae
- Clade: Tracheophytes
- Clade: Angiosperms
- Clade: Eudicots
- Order: Ranunculales
- Family: Ranunculaceae
- Genus: Anemone
- Species: A. parviflora

Binomial name
- Anemone parviflora Michx.

= Anemone parviflora =

Species of flowering plant in the buttercup family

Anemone parviflora, the northern anemone, or small-flowered anemone, is a herbaceous flowering plant species in the buttercup family Ranunculaceae. Plants grow 10 to 30 cm (3.9 to 12 in) tall, from a thin, 2 mm thick rhizome. Stem leaves without petioles, basal leaves few with long petioles and deeply three-parted. Plants flowering late spring to mid summer with the flowers composed of five or six sepals normally white or soft bluish colored, 8 to 13 mm long. The plants produce one peduncle with one solitary flower. Fruits in heads ovoid in shape, 10 mm long or less, fruits densely woolly, not winged and with straight 1 to 2.5 mm long beaks.

Native to central and western North America mostly in Canada and Alaska but also south to Idaho and even into Utah where it is found growing on wet rocky ledges, meadows and along stream banks in normally calcareous soils.
