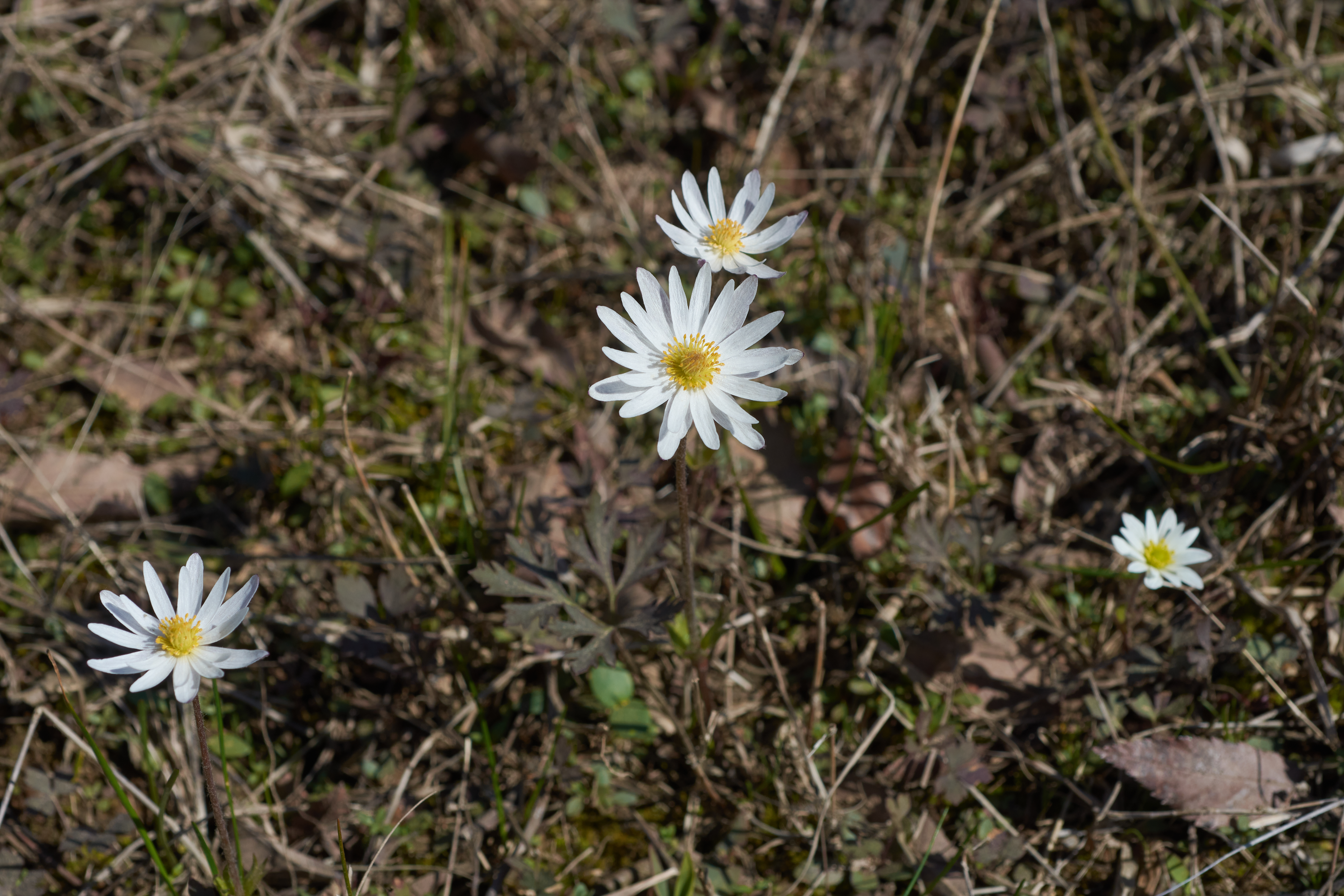
- A. caroliniana flower

Scientific classification
- Kingdom: Plantae
- Clade: Embryophytes
- Clade: Tracheophytes
- Clade: Spermatophytes
- Clade: Angiosperms
- Clade: Eudicots
- Order: Ranunculales
- Family: Ranunculaceae
- Genus: Anemone
- Species: A. caroliniana

Binomial name
- Anemone caroliniana Walter

Forms & Varieties ^{*}
- A. c. fo. caroliniana (autonym); A. c. fo. violacea Clute; A. c. var. heterophylla Torr. & A.Gray^{List source :} *_{NOTE: Plant authorities disagree over whether the subdivisions of this species should accepted or not: The Missouri Botanical Garden accepts the names; while The Plant List asserts them all to be probable synonyms of A. caroliniana}

Synonyms
- Anemone hartiana Raf.; Anemone tenella Pursh

= Anemone caroliniana =

Species of flowering plant in the buttercup family

Anemone caroliniana, the Carolina anemone, is a species of herbaceous flowering plant in the family Ranunculaceae. Plants grow (7)10 to 40 cm tall, from short tuber-like rhizomes that are 10–30 mm long. Stem leaves without petioles. Plants flowering early to mid spring with the flowers composed of 10 to 20 sepals (sometimes called tepals) normally white or soft rose colored but also purple, one flower per stem, the sepals are 10 to 22 mm long and 2–5 mm wide. Fruits in heads ovoid to subcylindric in shape, 17–25 mm long.

== Distribution ==
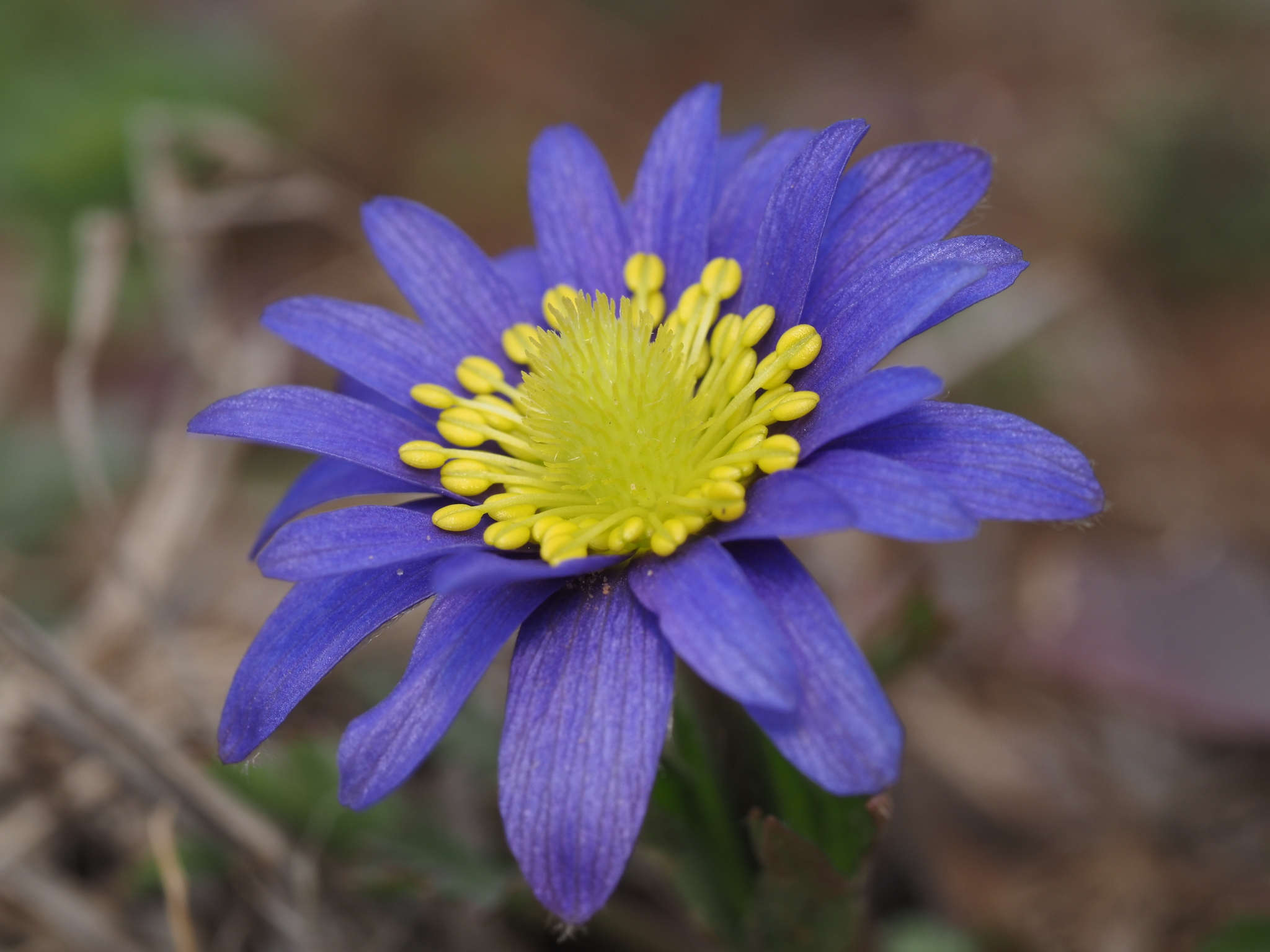
Anemone caroliniana flower

Anemone caroliniana is native to central and south eastern parts of the U.S., primarily in the Great Plains and the Mississippi Valley with scattered populations in the Southeast from Tennessee and Mississippi to the Carolinas. Anemone caroliniana was at one time recorded from Vigo County, Indiana, but has since become locally extinct in that state.

== Habitat ==
Anemone caroliniana is found growing in dry prairies, barrens and open rocky woods.
