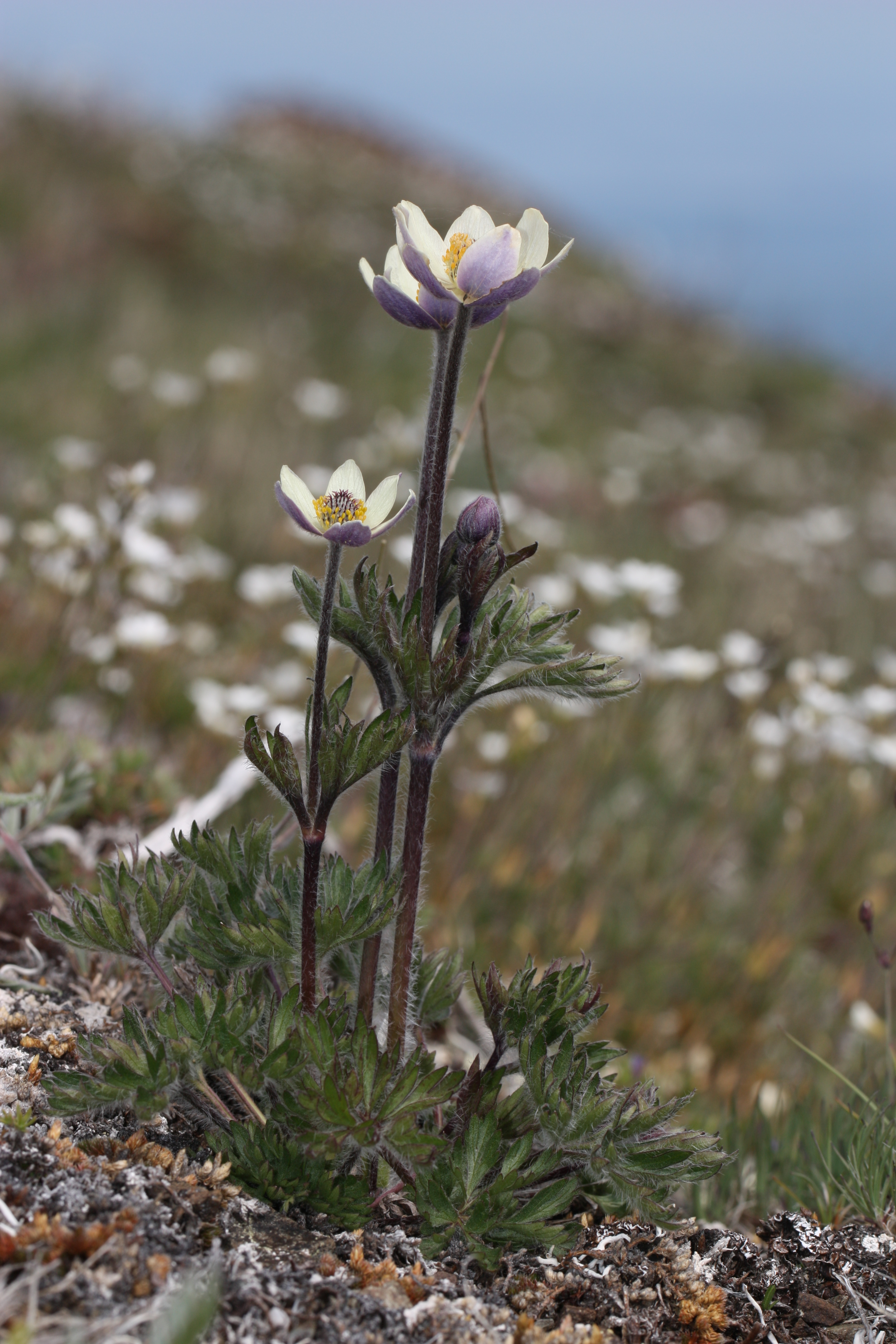

Scientific classification
- Kingdom: Plantae
- Clade: Embryophytes
- Clade: Tracheophytes
- Clade: Spermatophytes
- Clade: Angiosperms
- Clade: Eudicots
- Order: Ranunculales
- Family: Ranunculaceae
- Genus: Anemone
- Species: A. multifida

Binomial name
- Anemone multifida Poir.

= Anemone multifida =

Species of flowering plant in the buttercup family

Anemone multifida is a species of flowering plant in the buttercup family known by the common names cutleaf anemone, Pacific anemone and globe anemone. It is a perennial herb native to northern North America from Alaska to New York and as far south as Arizona and New Mexico. It is also known from parts of South America.

== Description ==
This is a perennial herb which is quite variable in appearance, especially across varieties. It grows from a branching caudex to heights from 10 to 70 centimeters (3.9 to 28 in). The long petioled leaves are covered in a coat of long silky or coarse white hairs. Each leaf is divided into many long, pointed lobes, and the lobes are sometimes subdivided. Including the petiole a single leaf may be 5 to 20 centimeters (2.0 to 7.9 in) long. The basal leaves are divided two or three times into narrow segments. The inflorescence holds one or more flowers. The flowers have no petals but four to eight (usually five) petallike sepals which may be nearly any color but typically white. They are somewhat hairy, especially on the outer surface. The center of the flower contains up to 80 stamens. The fruit is an achene that is woolly with long hairs, beaked, and a few millimeters long.

== Varieties ==
There are several varieties of this species:

- A. m. var. multifida – throughout species range
- A. m. var. saxicola (red windflower) – limited to western parts of species range
- A. m. var. stylosa – limited to Utah and Arizona
- A. m. var. tetonensis – limited to the montane west of the contiguous United States

== Distribution and habitat ==
Anemone multifida is found growing on calcareous ledges, in areas with rocky or gravelly soils around lakes and other water ways, and on dunes. In Minnesota it is recorded as growing in a prairie.

It is typically found growing in subarctic and boreal areas in western and central North America but some populations are also found in mountainous and temperate habitats in the southern parts of its North American range. It is also found around the Great lakes region and there are rare occurrences in the north eastern US states and eastern Canada.

A. multifada is poisonous as it has high ranunculin content: about 8.1% in aerial parts and 4% in root per dry weight.
