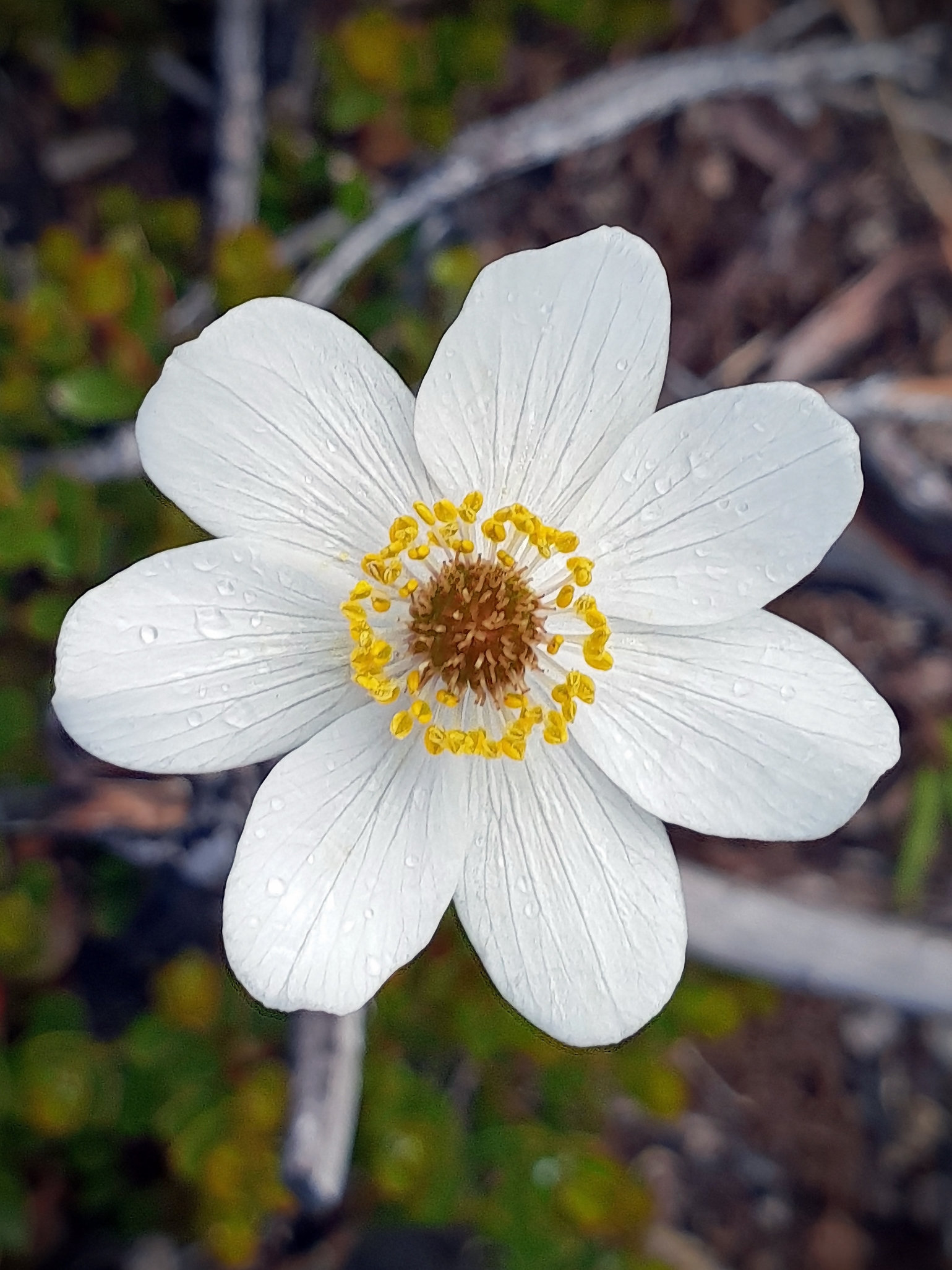
- Anemone crassifolia, The Spires Range, TAS. Photo: N. Delany

Scientific classification
- Kingdom: Plantae
- Clade: Tracheophytes
- Clade: Angiosperms
- Clade: Eudicots
- Order: Ranunculales
- Family: Ranunculaceae
- Genus: Anemone
- Species: A. crassifolia

Binomial name
- Anemone crassifolia Hook.
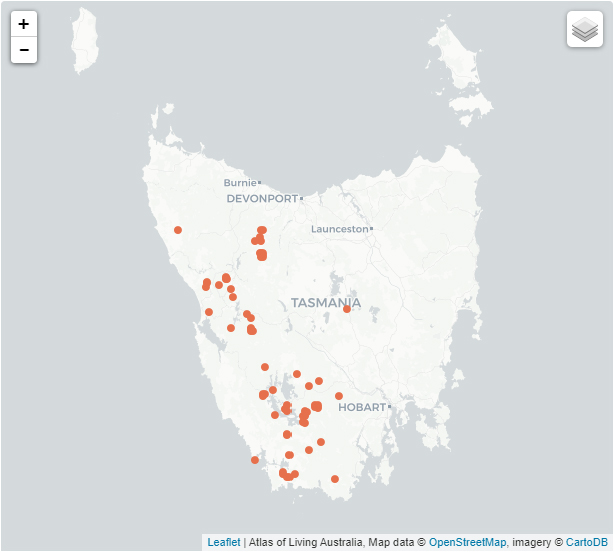
- Distribution of Anemone crassifolia from Atlas of Living Australia

= Anemone crassifolia =

Species of plant endemic to Tasmania

Anemone crassifolia, commonly known as mountain anemone, is a perennial herb in the family Ranunculaceae and is endemic to Tasmania, Australia. The species is common in high alpine moorlands of western and southern Tasmania at approximately 1000m. It is the only representative of the genus Anemone found in Australia.

== Description ==
Anemone crassifolia is a small herbaceous plant with three to five thick dark green leaves, which are glossy on the upper (adaxial) surface and often purple on the lower (abaxial) surface. Each leaf is divided into 3 leaflets, 1.5-5 cm across with coarsely toothed margins. Leaves appear at the base of the flower stem or separately from the flowers, on long stalks, growing up from underground stems. The solitary flowers are white and conspicuous, 2–3 cm in diameter, with numerous yellow stamens, on erect, hairy stems up to 20 cm tall, appearing in early summer. The fruit is a group of achenes with hooked ends. A distinguishing feature of this species is the presence of three leaves arranged in a whorl, halfway up the flowering stem.

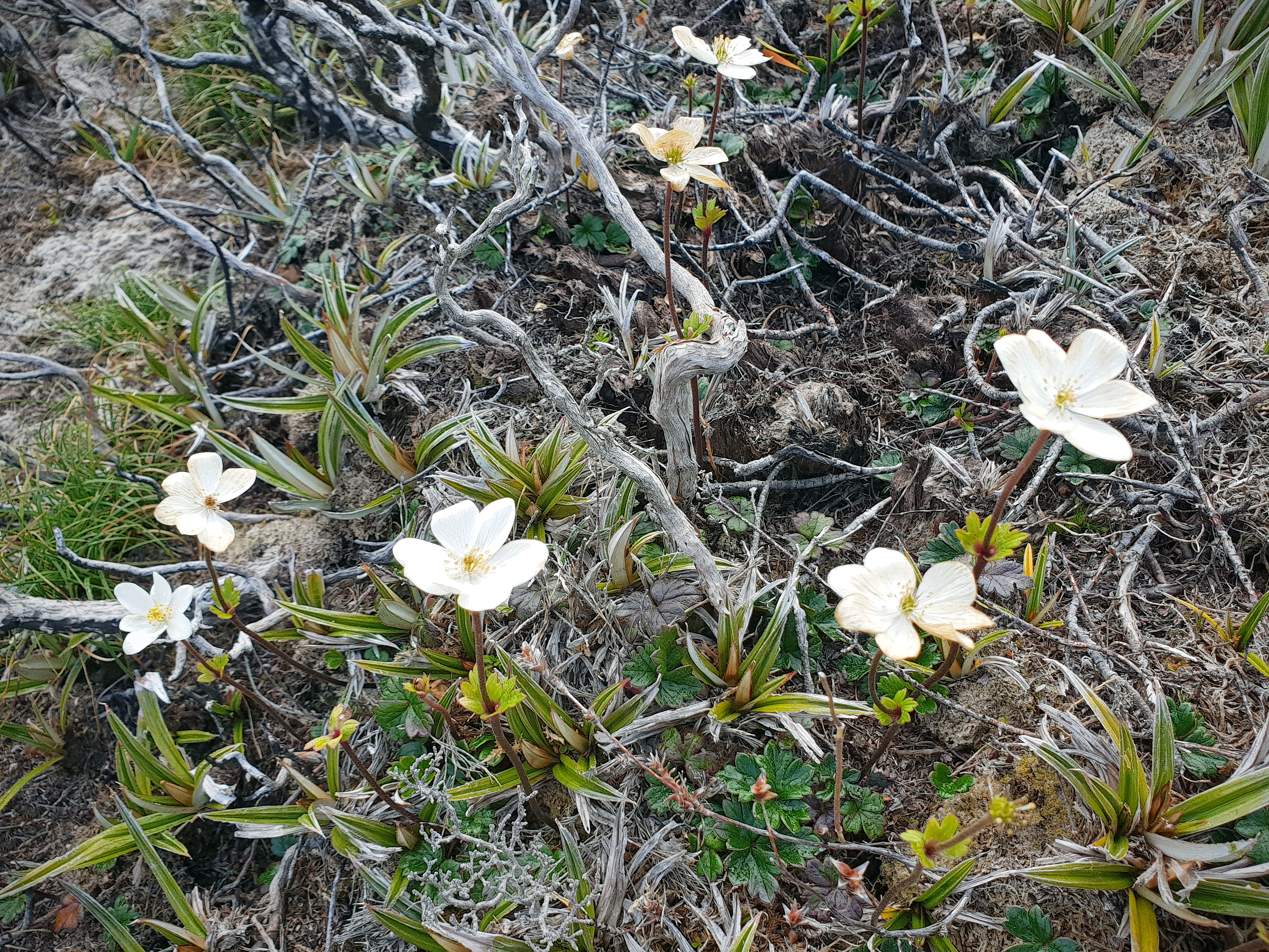
Anemone crassifolia

== Habitat and distribution ==
The distributional range of Anemone crassifolia is limited to high alpine areas in west and southwest Tasmania. It is a common constituent of cushion and buttongrass moorlands at around 1000m, where it prefers moist conditions and well-drained, peaty soil. Some key localities where this species has been observed are: Cradle Mountain-Lake St Clair National Park, Mount Field National Park, the Spires Range in the Franklin-Gordon Wild Rivers National Park, and the Twelvetrees Range near Strathgordon.

== Conservation status ==
Anemone crassifolia has not yet been assessed for the IUCN Red List and is not listed under the Threatened Species Protection Act 1995. While the species is relatively common in the plant communities and regions it currently occupies, its limited distributional range and vulnerability to suitable habitat reduction as a consequence of climate change, may warrant careful consideration for its future assessment and conservation.
