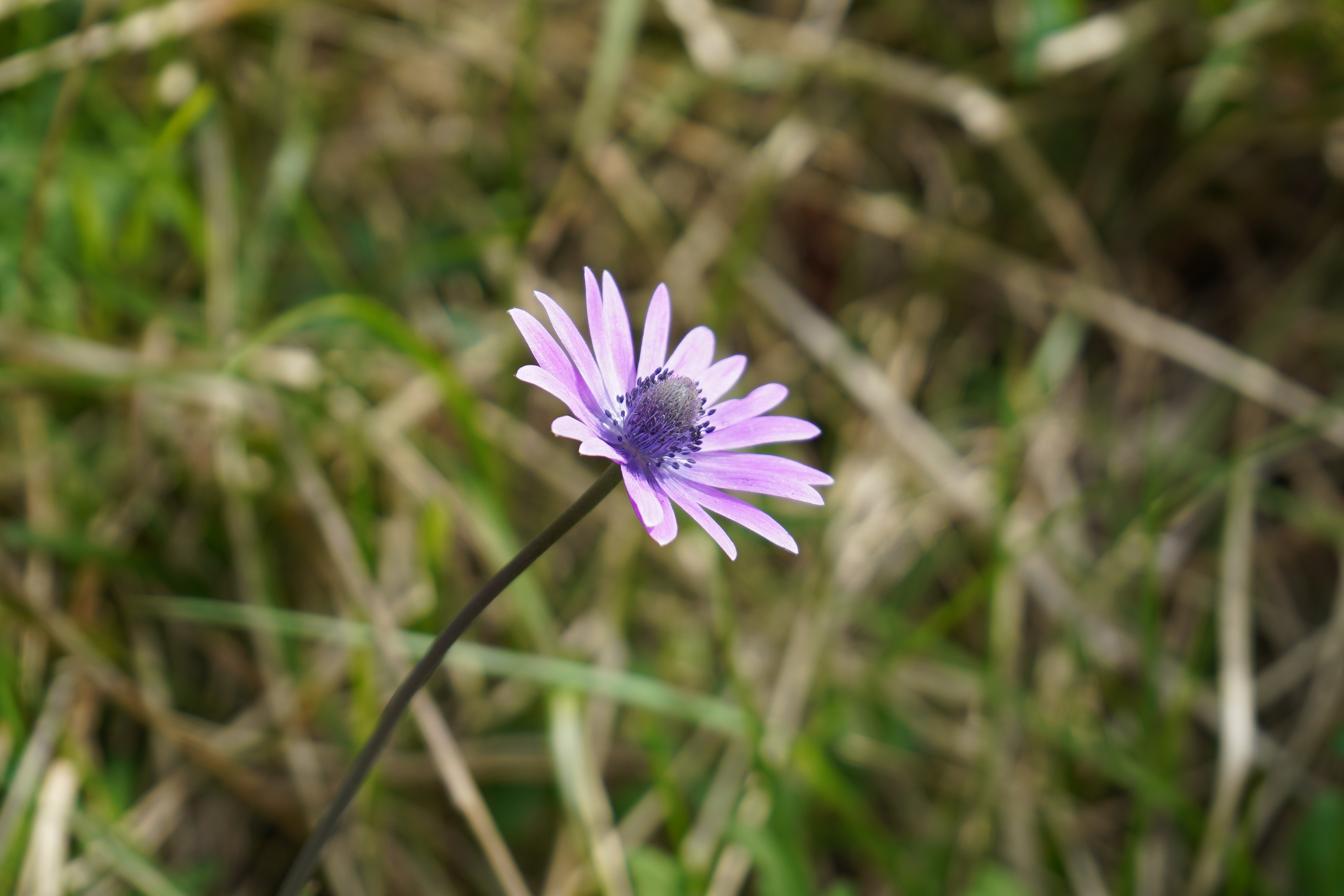

Scientific classification
- Kingdom: Plantae
- Clade: Embryophytes
- Clade: Tracheophytes
- Clade: Angiosperms
- Clade: Eudicots
- Order: Ranunculales
- Family: Ranunculaceae
- Genus: Anemone
- Species: A. hortensis

Binomial name
- Anemone hortensis L.

Synonyms
- Anemone stellata Lam.

= Anemone hortensis =

Species of flowering plant in the buttercup family

Anemone hortensis, commonly called broad-leaved anemone, is a perennial herbaceous flowering plant with an underground rhizome, in buttercup family Ranunculaceae. The genus name comes from the Greek ἄνεμος (ánemos, meaning "wind"), as an ancient legend tells that the flowers open only when the wind blows. The species name hortensis (from Latin hortus, meaning "vegetable garden") refers to the easiness with which this plant can be cultivated.

== Description ==
Anemone hortensis reaches on average 20–40 centimetres (7.9–15.7 in) of height. The stem is erect and pubescent. The basal leaves have a petiole 5–10 centimetres (2.0–3.9 in) long and are palmate or “hand-shaped”, with 3–5 toothed lobes. The solitary flowers are fragrant and range in color from white-bluish or mauve to red-purple, with a diameter of 3–6 centimetres (1.2–2.4 in). They have 12–20 lanceolate and acute petals, with numerous bluish or violet stamens and blue anthers. The flowering period extends from March through May. This plant is pollinated by wind or dispersed by animals.

== Gallery ==
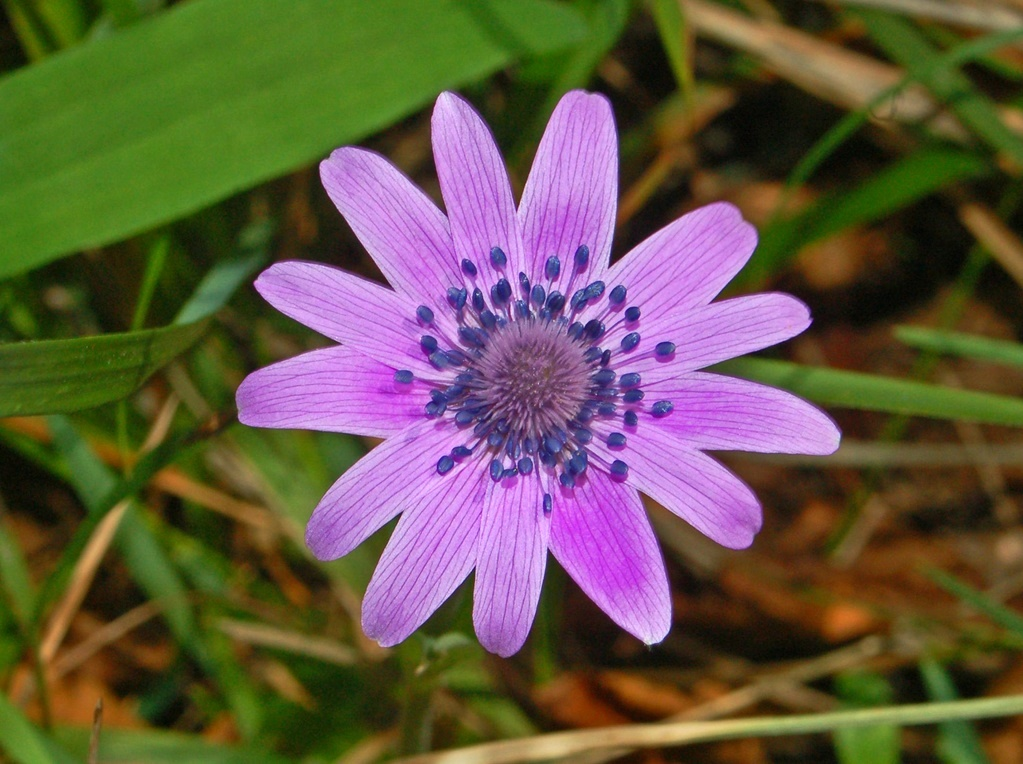
Flower of Anemone hortensis

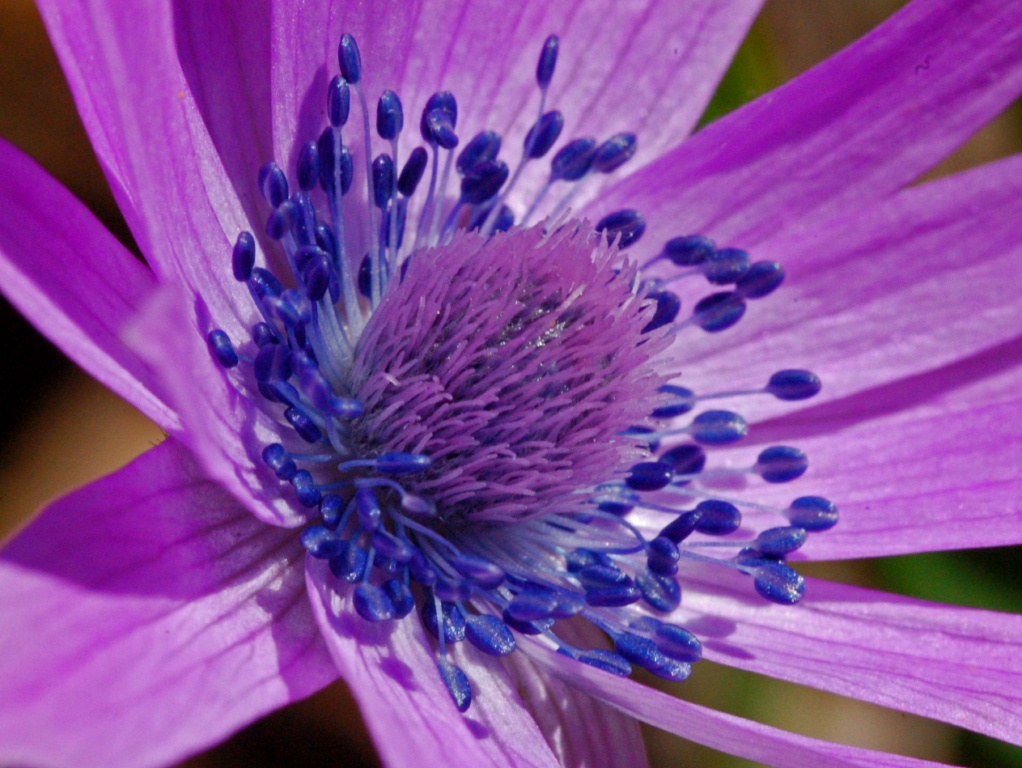
Close-up on Anemone hortensis

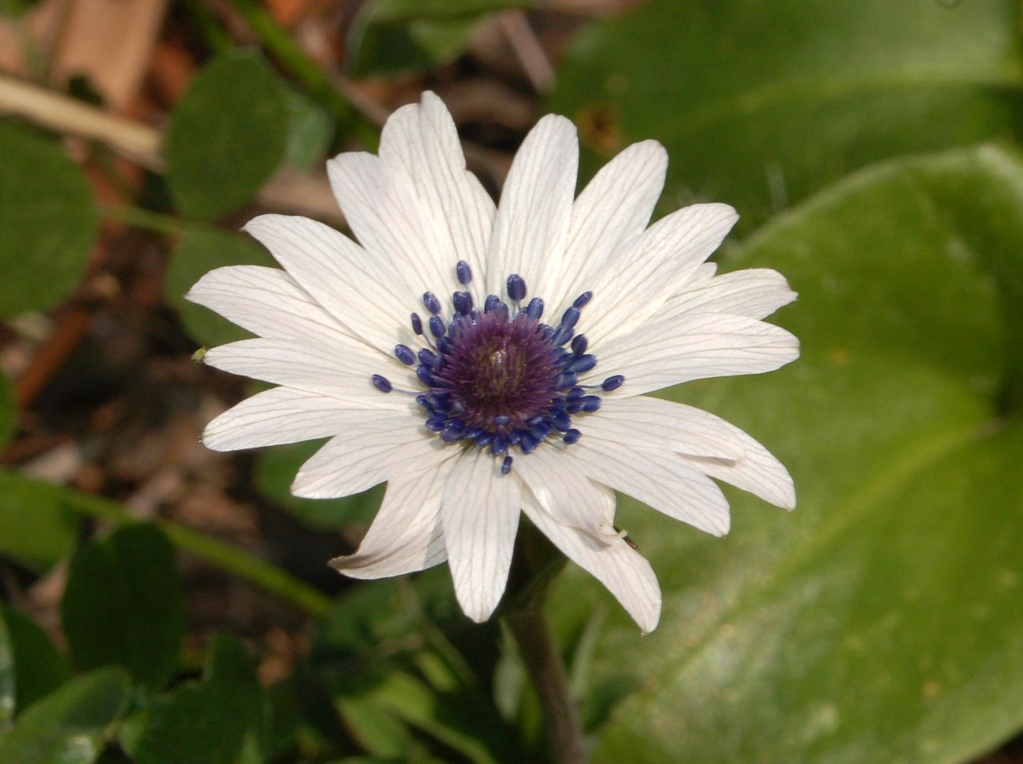
Flower of Anemone hortensis

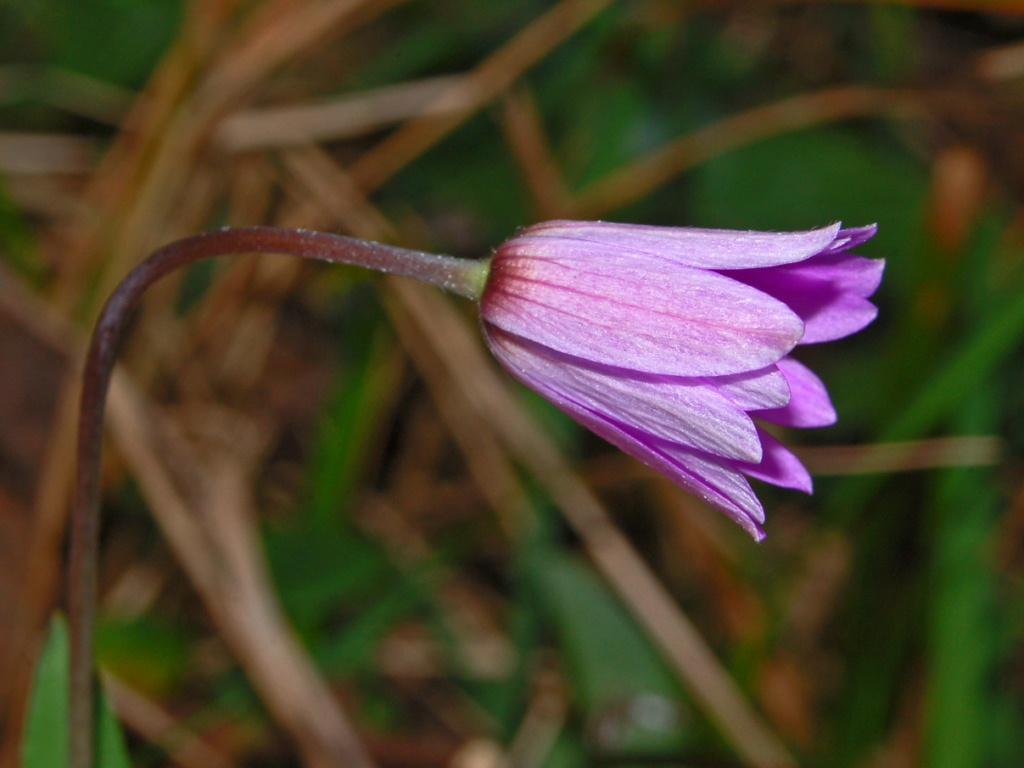
Flower of Anemone hortensis

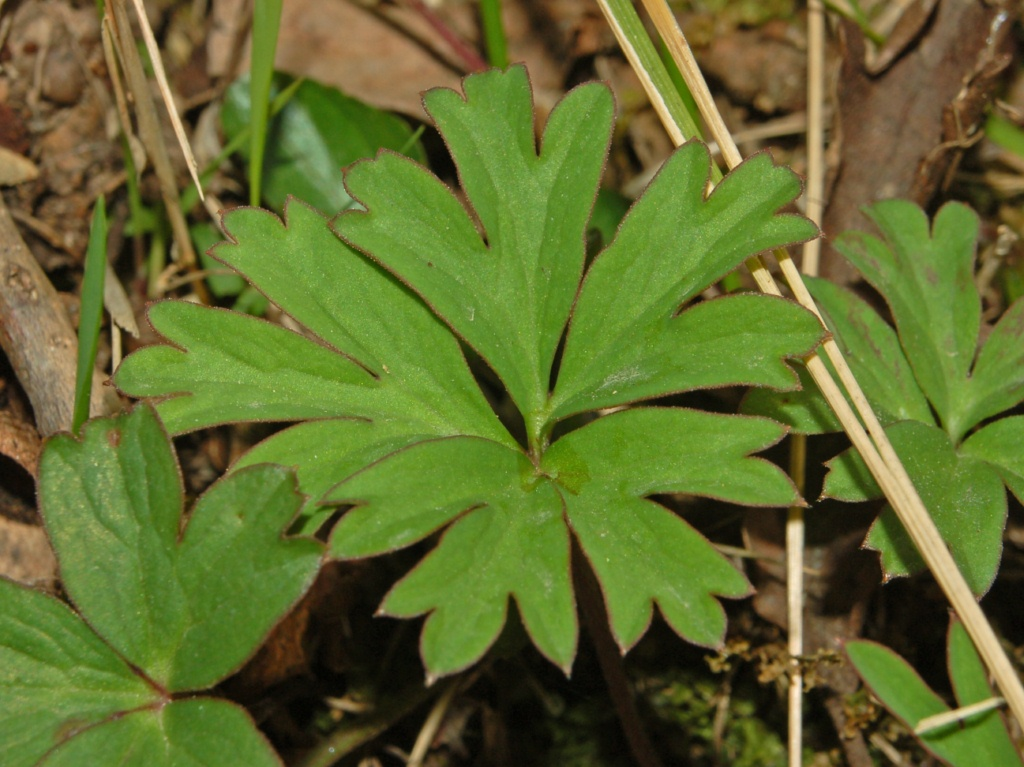
Leaves of Anemone hortensis

== Distribution ==
This plant is endemic to Mediterranean basin and it is distributed in France, Italy, Greece, Albania, Bulgaria, Serbia, Croatia, North Macedonia Montenegro and Turkey

== Habitat ==
These plants grow at an altitude of 0–1,200 metres (0–3,937 ft) above sea level (rarely up to 1,800 metres (5,900 ft)). They are found in woods, vineyards, lawns and bushes.
