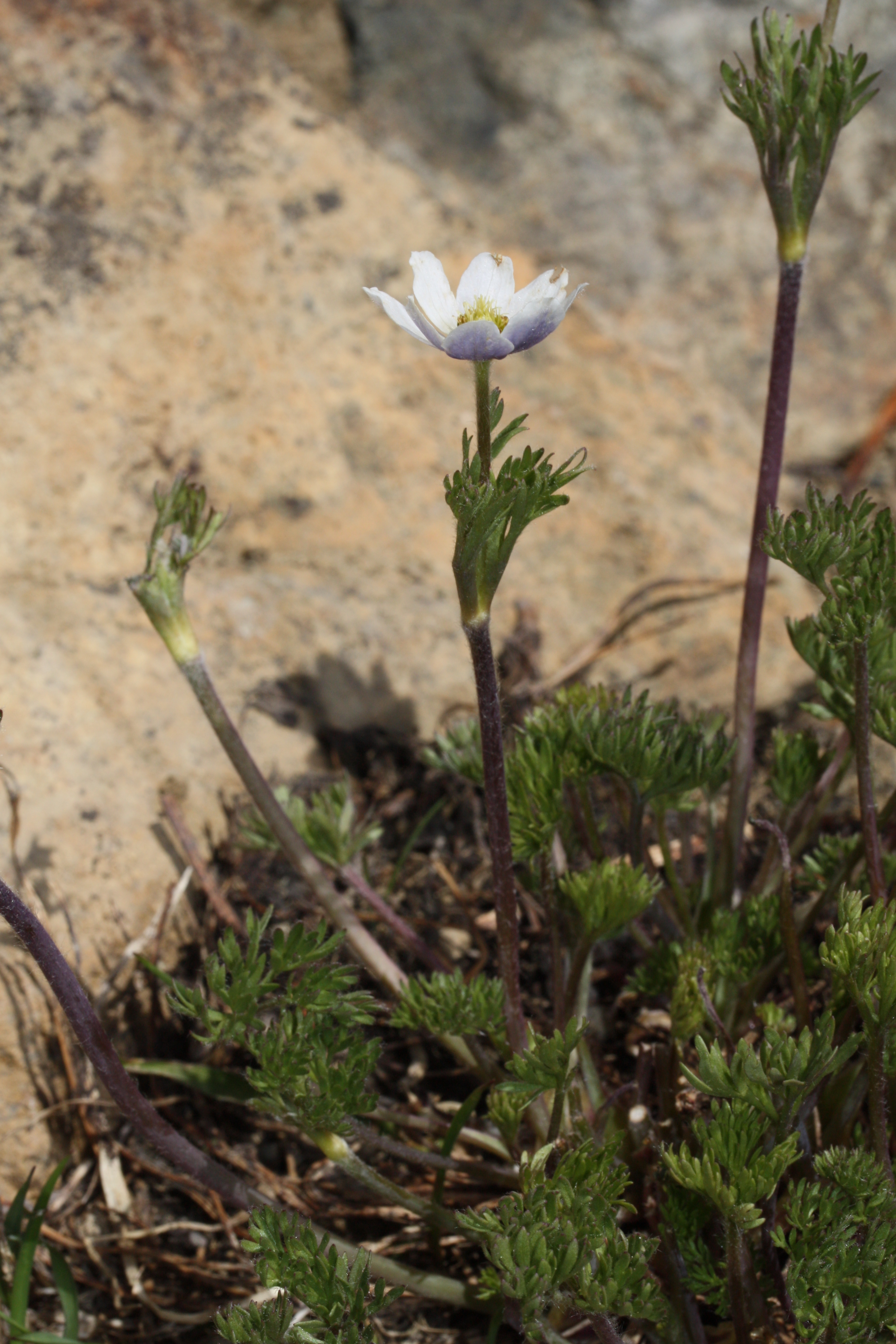
- Wenatchee Mountains

Scientific classification
- Kingdom: Plantae
- Clade: Tracheophytes
- Clade: Angiosperms
- Clade: Eudicots
- Order: Ranunculales
- Family: Ranunculaceae
- Genus: Anemone
- Species: A. drummondii

Binomial name
- Anemone drummondii S.Wats.

= Anemone drummondii =

Species of flowering plant in the buttercup family

Anemone drummondii is a species of flowering plant in the buttercup family Ranunculaceae, known by the common name Drummond's anemone. It is native to mountains in western North America.

== Description ==
This wildflower is a squat perennial with short erect stems and small, soft, wrinkled leaves while in flower. At the early flowering stage, the leaves vary from medium green to dark red in color depending on stage and sun exposure. After flowering the leaves expand fully and reveal a multiply ternate dissected form with ultimate segments oblong to linear and a few mm wide. At this stage the leaves are medium green to gray green in color. Each clumping plant produces several showy flowers, each with five to eight petal-like sepals but no petals. The sepals are usually white (occasionally bright blue to purplish blue) usually with a distinct blue tint especially on the underside. The flower center is filled with many yellow-anthered stamens. The fruits are woolly achenes.

== Range and habitat ==
Anemone drummondii is native to western North America from California to Alaska. It is found in mountainous environments such as the Cascade Range, Sierra Nevada, and the Rocky Mountains, extending from open coniferous forests to rocky slopes at alpine elevations. In the Wenatchee Mountains of Washington State it is notable for being tolerant of rocky serpentine soils, in some places comprising the dominant species on steep serpentine slopes.

== Gallery ==
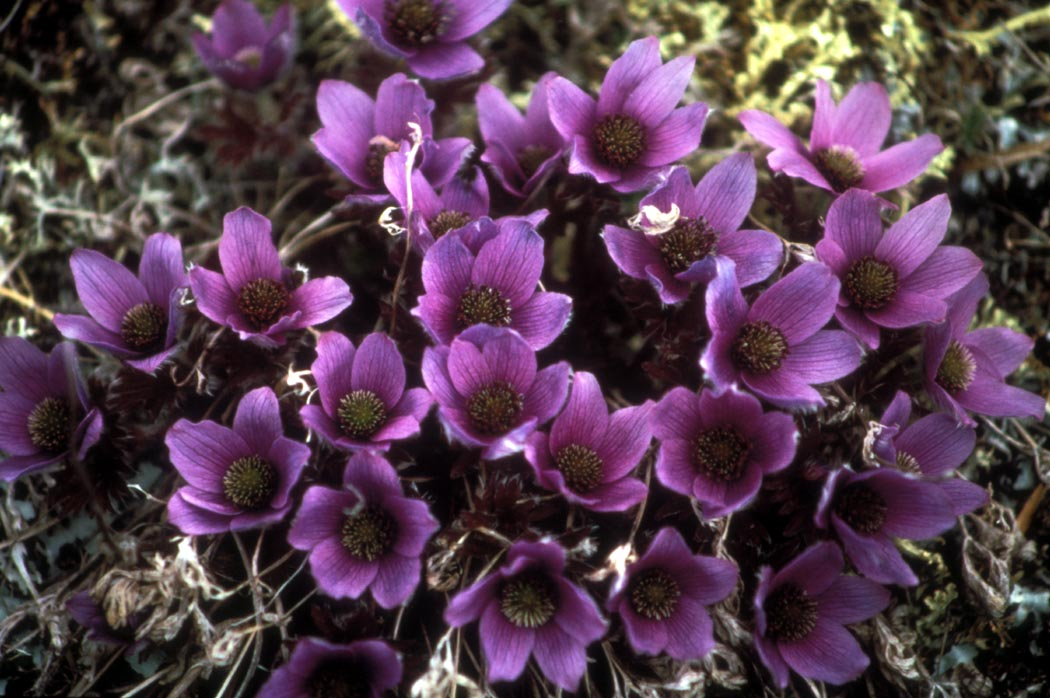
Anemone drummondii blue form

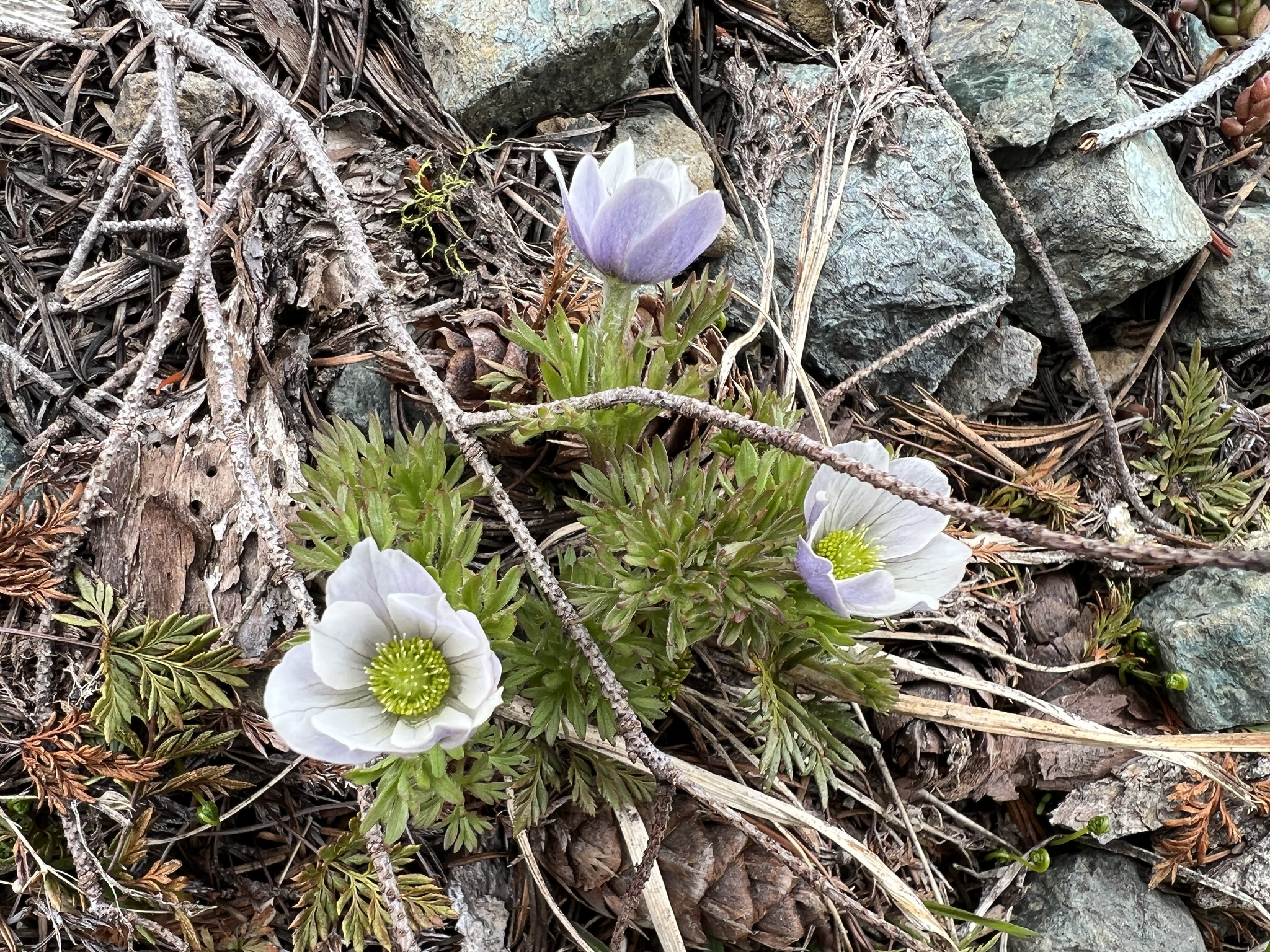
Anemone drummondii flowers just opening

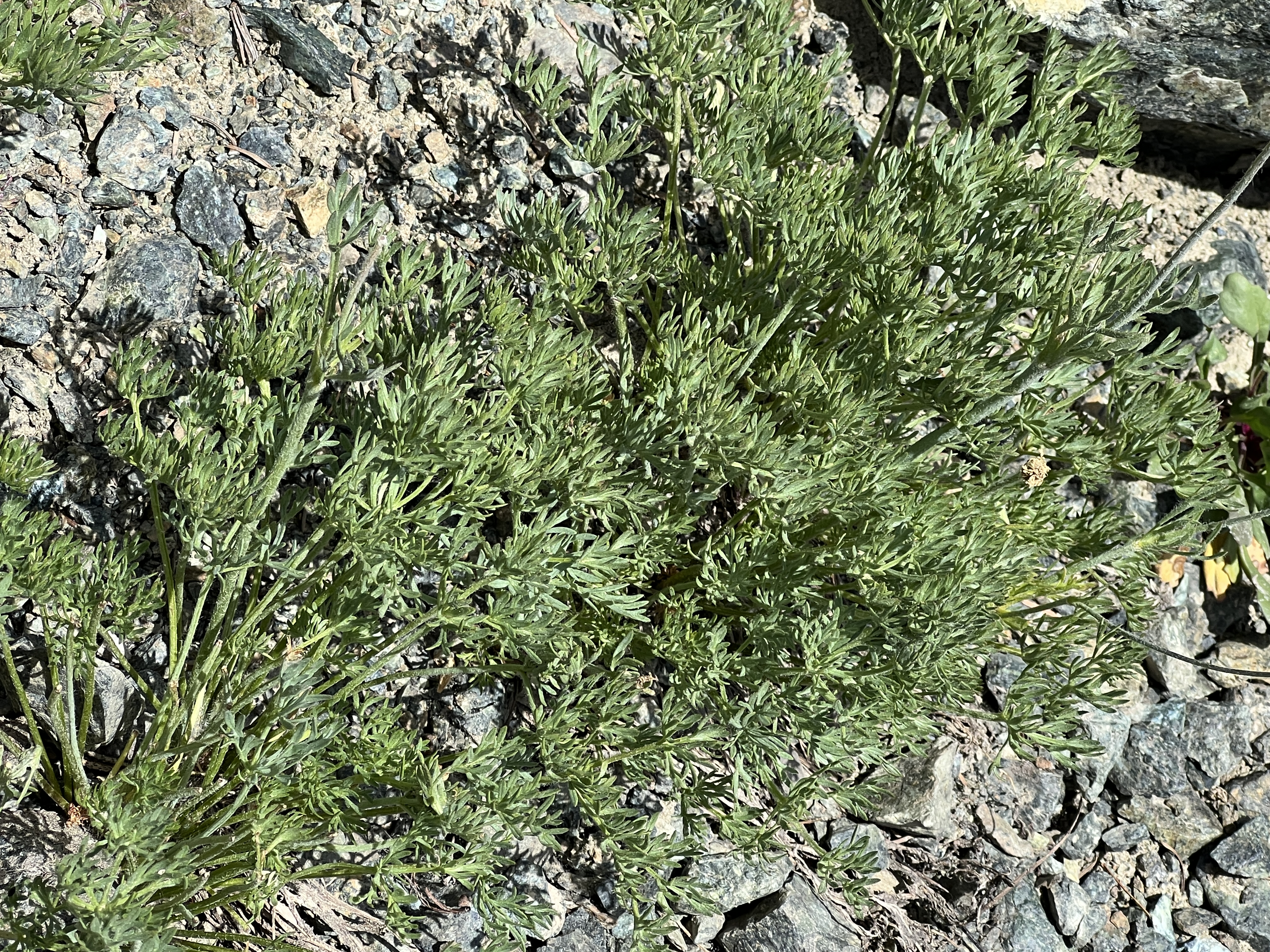
Anenome drummondii foliage after flowering
