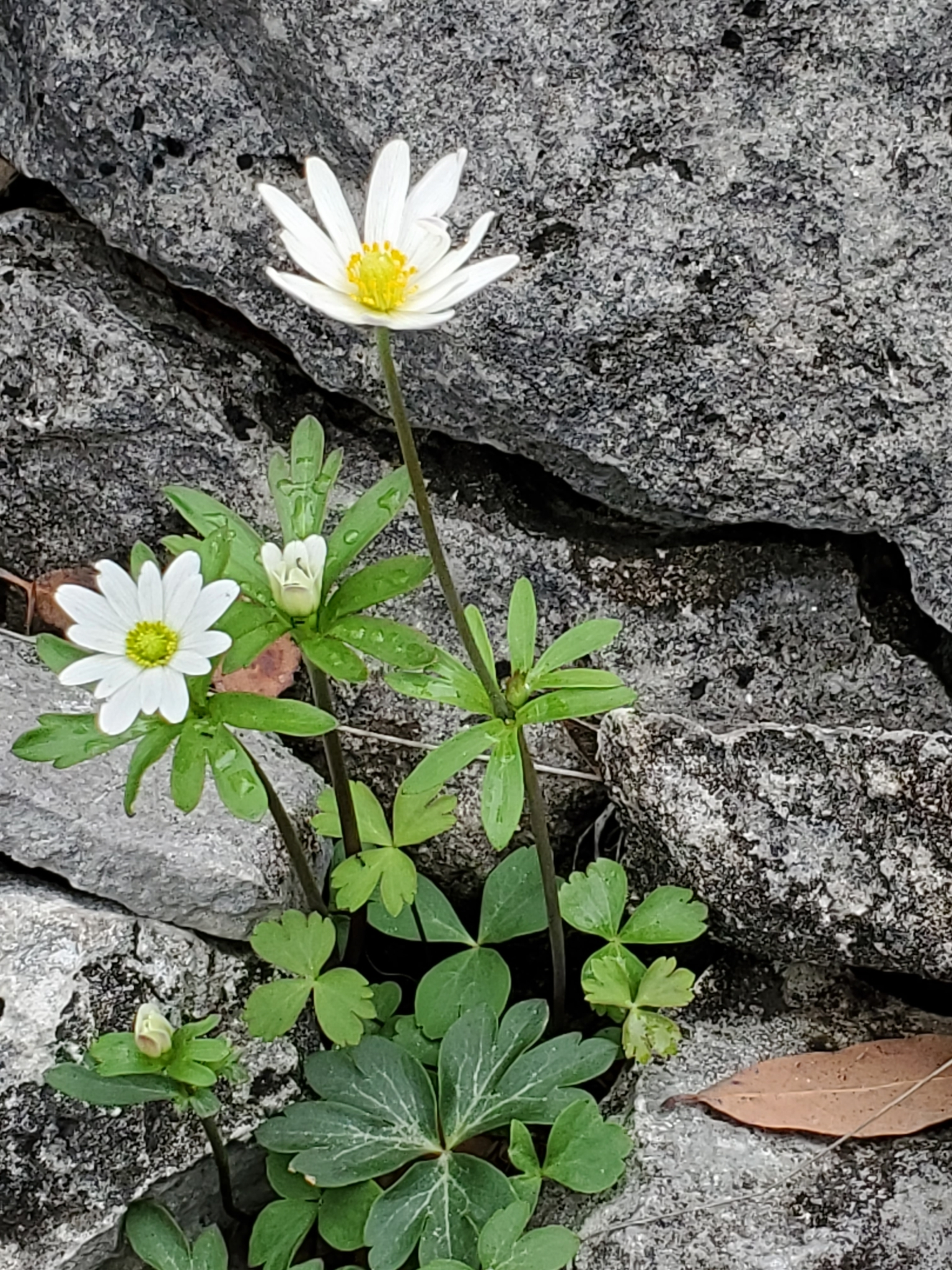

Scientific classification
- Kingdom: Plantae
- Clade: Tracheophytes
- Clade: Angiosperms
- Clade: Eudicots
- Order: Ranunculales
- Family: Ranunculaceae
- Genus: Anemone
- Species: A. edwardsiana

Binomial name
- Anemone edwardsiana Tharp

= Anemone edwardsiana =

Species of wildflower

Anemone edwardsiana is a species of perennial wildflower in the buttercup family Ranunculaceae, with the common name Edwards Plateau Anemone. It is found on the Edwards Plateau in Texas.

== Description ==
Anemone edwardsiana grows from tubers and produces several lobed basal leaves. The flower is held on a stalk up to 50 centimeters tall with a deeply divided leaf-like bract below the single (occasionally two) white flower. The flower may sometimes have a blue or red cast.

== Range and Habitat ==
Anemone edwardsiana is found mostly on moist limestone bluffs and ledges and in rocky limestone-derived soils on the Edwards Plateau.
