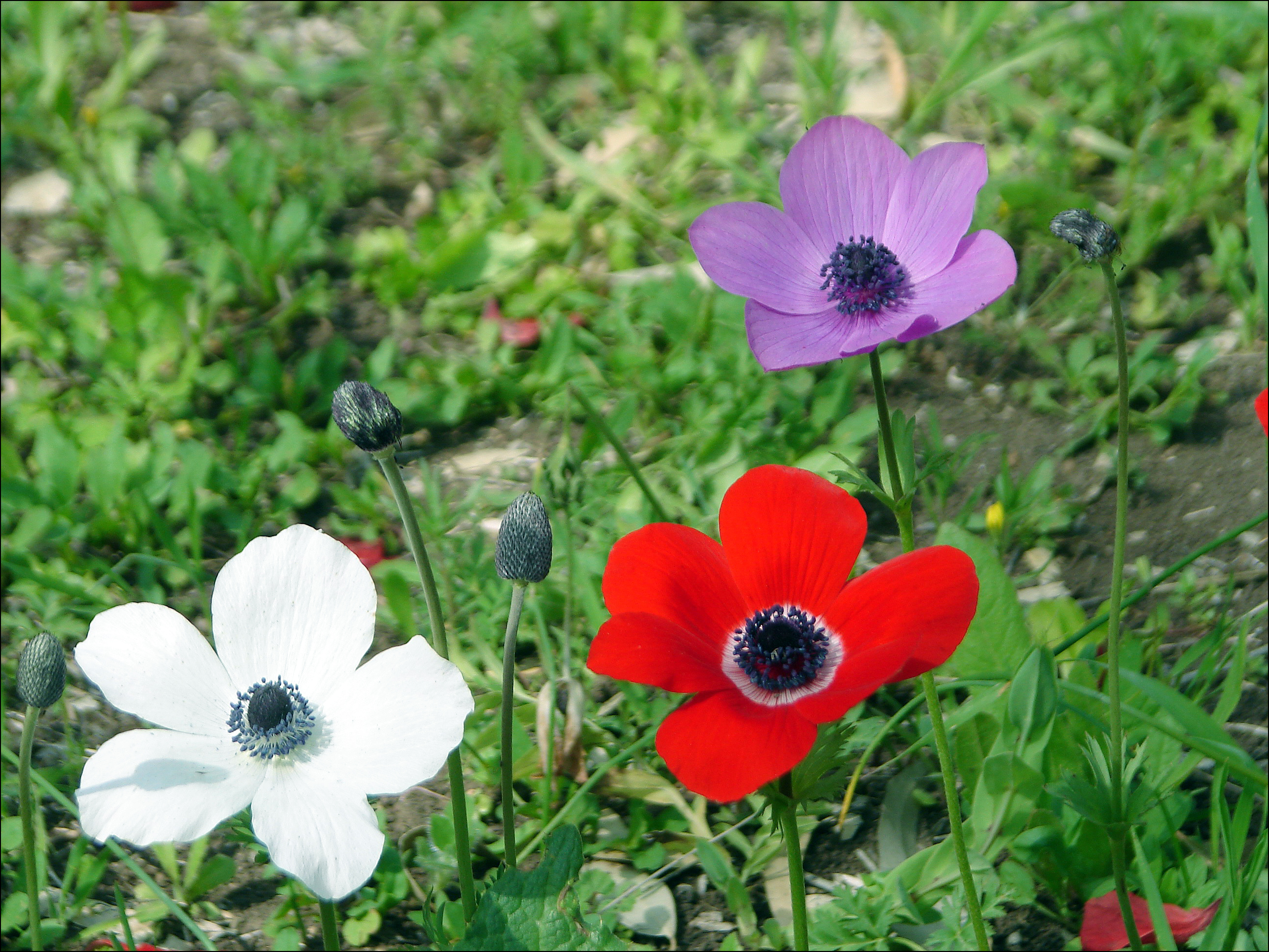
- Anemone coronaria

Scientific classification
- Kingdom: Plantae
- Clade: Tracheophytes
- Clade: Angiosperms
- Clade: Eudicots
- Order: Ranunculales
- Family: Ranunculaceae
- Subfamily: Ranunculoideae
- Tribe: Anemoneae
- Genus: Anemone; L.

Type species
- Anemone coronaria L.

Synonyms
- Abelemis Raf. ex Britton; Anemanthus Fourr.; Flammara Hill; Hartiana Raf.; Pulsatilloides (DC.) Starod.

= Anemone =

Genus of flowering plants

Anemone (/əˈnɛməniː/) is a genus of flowering plants in the buttercup family Ranunculaceae. Plants of the genus are commonly called windflowers. They are native to the temperate and subtropical regions of all continents except Australia and Antarctica. The genus is closely related to several other genera including Anemonoides, Anemonastrum, Hepatica, and Pulsatilla. Some botanists include these genera within Anemone.

== Description ==
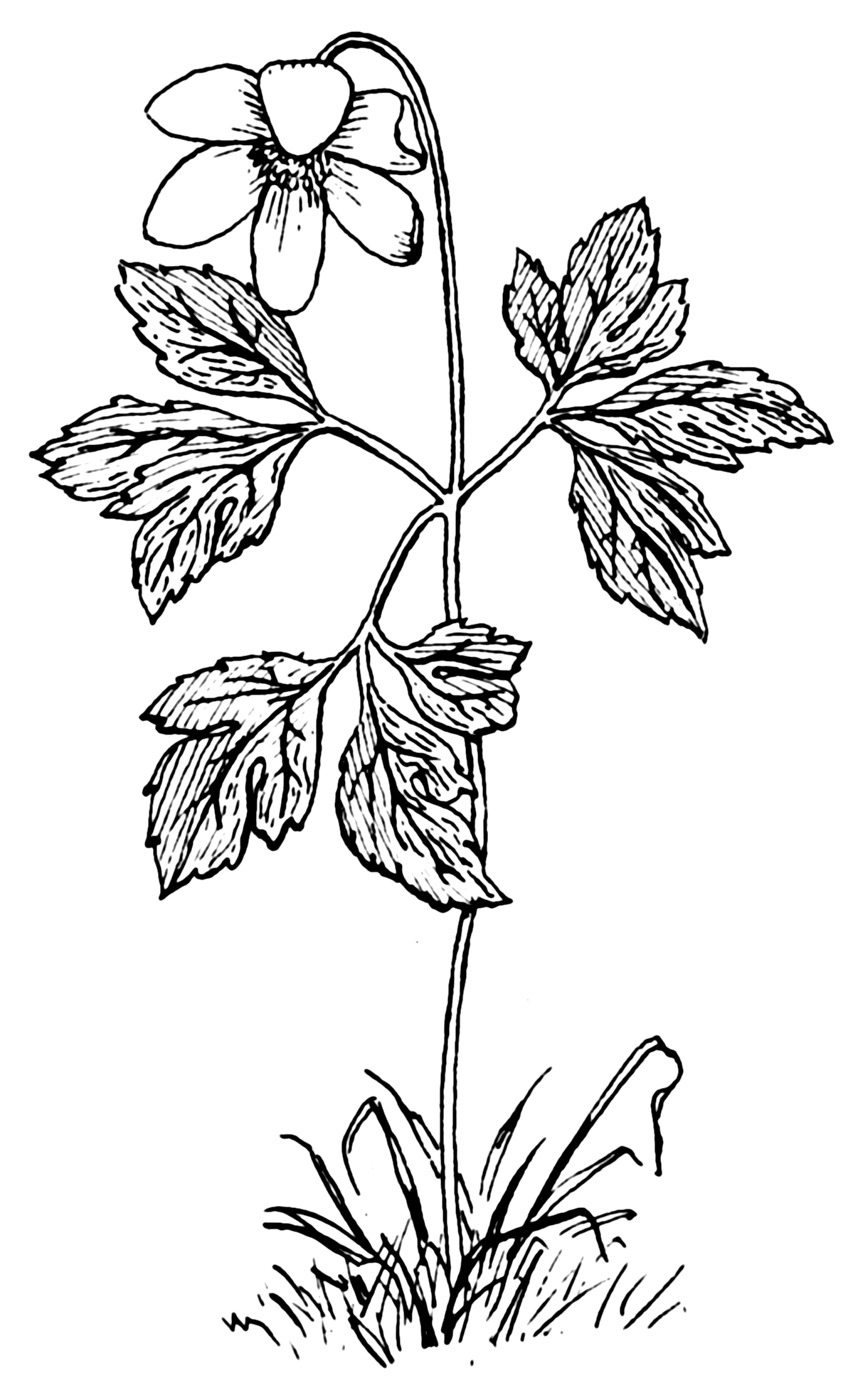
An illustration of an anemone

Anemone are perennials that have basal leaves with long leaf-stems that can be upright or prostrate. Leaves are simple or compound with lobed, parted, or undivided leaf blades. The leaf margins are toothed or entire.

Flowers with 4–27 sepals are produced singly, in cymes of 2–9 flowers, or in umbels, above a cluster of leaf- or sepal-like bracts. Sepals can be any color. The pistils have one ovule. The flowers have nectaries, but petals are missing in the majority of species.

The fruits are ovoid to obovoid shaped achenes that are collected together in a tight cluster, ending variously lengthened stalks, although many species have sessile clusters terminating the stems. The achenes are beaked and some species have feathery hairs attached to them.

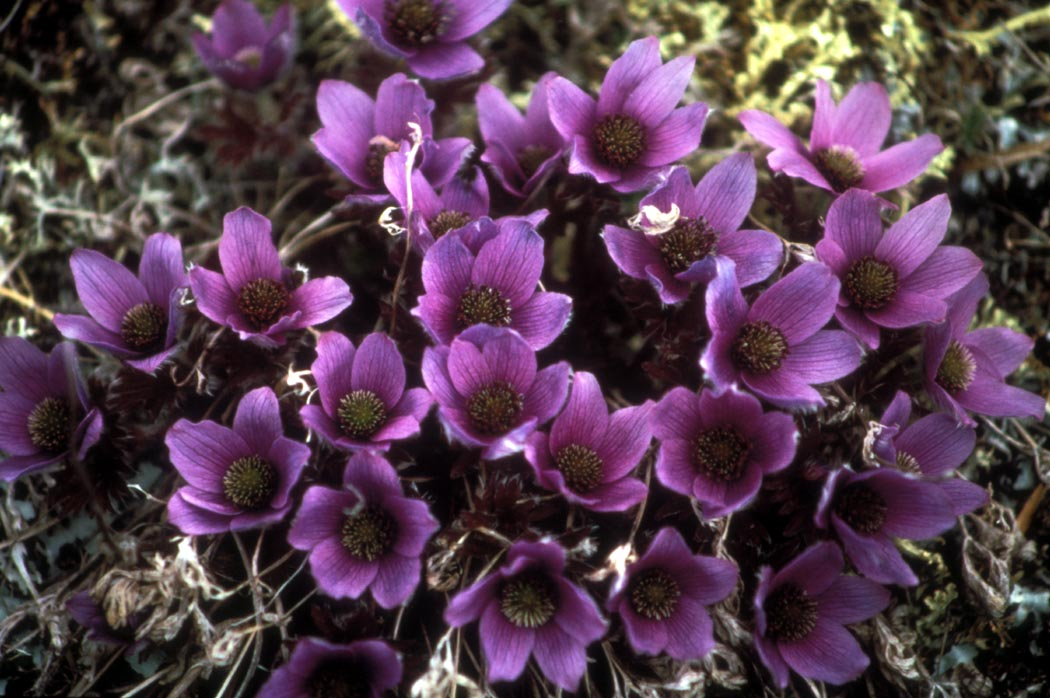
Anemone drummondii

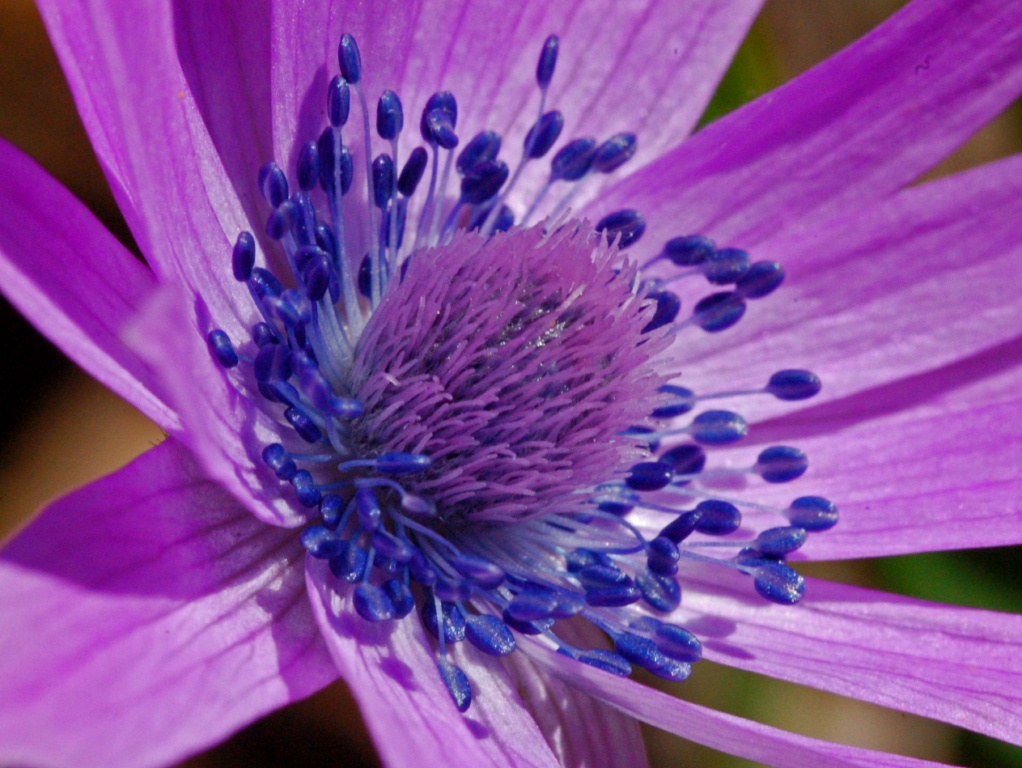
Anemone hortensis

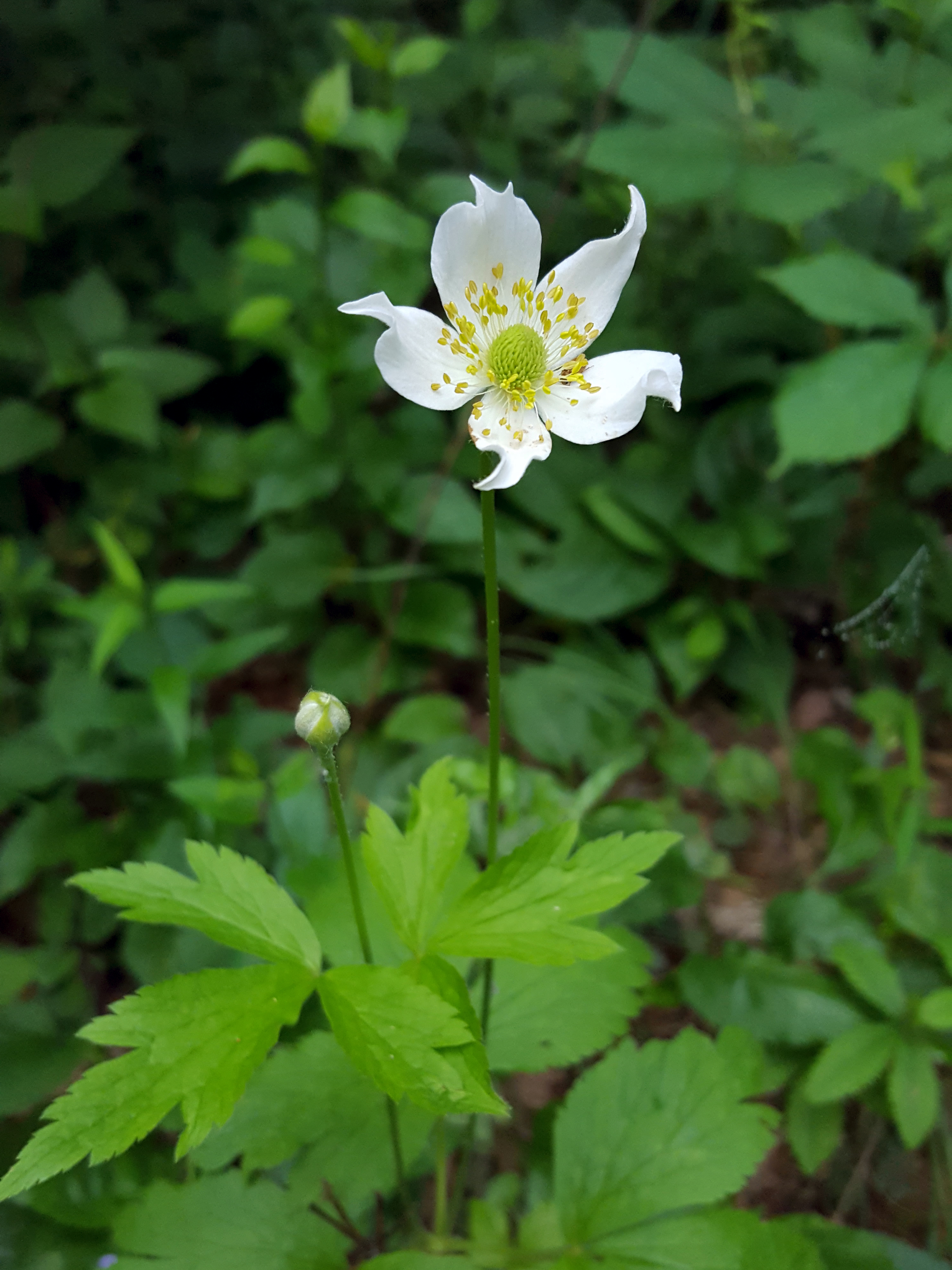
A. virginiana

== Taxonomy ==
Anemone alba, known as White Anemone: botanical print from the Curtis's Botanical Magazine (1820).

In 1753, Carl Linnaeus named the Anemone, which is situated in the tribe Anemoneae, subfamily Ranunculoideae, and the buttercup family Ranunculaceae.

As considered in the broader sense (sensu lato), the genus is sometimes considered to include a number of other genera, such as Anemonoides, Anemonastrum, Hepatica, Pulsatilla, Knowltonia, Barneoudia, and Oreithales.

In 1994, Hoot and colleagues described how early molecular analyses divided the genus into two subgenera (Anemonidium and Anemone), with seven sections, and 12 informal subsections.

In 2008, Ziman and colleagues treated the genus Anemone as 5 subgenera, 23 sections, 4 subsections, 23 series and about 118 species.

In 2009, Wang et al. included several of these as separate genera within Anemoneae, a tribe with six genera in total.

In 2012, a further reclassification by Hoot and colleagues (2012) estimated 200 species. Hoot et al. found many of the previously defined subdivisions, based on morphological characteristics were polyphyletic or paraphyletic. In contrast, two clearly defined monophyletic clades emerged corresponding to the above two subgenera. Anemonidium demonstrated four subclades, corresponding to sections. The larger subgenus Anemone showed a similar pattern.

Hoot et al. proposed the following two subgenera and several sections be retained, with a number of subsections and series:

- Anemone subg. Anemonidium (Spach) Juz.
  - A. subg. Anemonidium sect. Hepatica Spreng.
  - A. subg. Anemonidium sect. Keiskea Tamura
  - A. subg. Anemonidium sect. Anemonidium Spach
  - A. subg. Anemonidium sect. Omalocarpus DC.
- Anemone subg. Anemone L.
  - A. subg. Anemone sect. Pulsatilloides DC.
  - A. subg. Anemone sect. Pulsatilla (Mill.) DC.
  - A. subg. Anemone sect. Rivularidium Jancz.
  - A. subg. Anemone sect. Anemone L.

In 2018, Maarten J. M. Christenhusz and James W. Byng described Eriocapitella hupehensis. Eriocapitella had been proposed as a section of genus Anemone in 1991, but later segregated into genus Eriocapitella. Kew's Plants of the World Online (POWO) accepts six former Anemone species in the genus Eriocapitella: Eriocapitella hupehensis, Eriocapitella japonica, Eriocapitella rivularis, Eriocapitella rupicola, Eriocapitella tomentosa and Eriocapitella vitifolia as well as an artificial hybrid Eriocapitella × hybrida. All of these species except E. rupicola, E. japonica and E. rivularis are called fall-blooming anemones and cultivated plants of E. hupehensis, E. japonica, E. tomentosa and the hybrids are known as Japanese anemones.

=== Species ===
As of April 2020, Kew's Plants of the World Online lists 63 species in the genus.

Species in Genus Anemone
  - Anemone afghanica Podlech
  - Anemone alaschanica (Schipcz.) Borodina
  - Anemone angustiloba H.Eichler
  - Anemone baissunensis Juz. ex M.M.Sharipova
  - Anemone begoniifolia H.Lév. & Vaniot
  - Anemone berlandieri Pritz.
  - Anemone biflora DC.
  - Anemone brachystema W.T.Wang
  - Anemone brevistyla C.C.Chang ex W.T.Wang
  - Anemone bucharica (Regel) Finet & Gagnep.
  - Anemone canadensis L.
  - Anemone caroliniana Walter
  - Anemone cathayensis Kitag. ex Tamura
  - Anemone coronaria L.
  - Anemone crassifolia Hook.
  - Anemone cylindrica A.Gray
  - Anemone debilis Fisch. ex Turcz.
  - Anemone decapetala Ard.
  - Anemone drummondii S.Watson
  - Anemone edwardsiana Tharp
  - Anemone flexuosissima Rech.f.
  - Anemone fulingensis W.T.Wang & Z.Y.Liu
  - Anemone fuscopurpurea H.Hara
  - Anemone glazioviana Urb.
  - Anemone hemsleyi Britton
  - Anemone hokouensis C.Y.Wu ex W.T.Wang
  - Anemone hortensis L.
  - Anemone howellii Jeffrey & W.W.Sm.
  - Anemone imperialis Kadota
  - Anemone koraiensis Nakai
  - Anemone lacerata (Y.L.Xu) Luferov
  - Anemone laceratoincisa W.T.Wang
  - Anemone liangshanica W.T.Wang
  - Anemone lithophila Rydb.
  - Anemone lutienensis W.T.Wang
  - Anemone milinensis W.T.Wang
  - Anemone motuoensis W.T.Wang
  - Anemone multifida Poir.
  - Anemone nutantiflora W.T.Wang & L.Q.Li
  - Anemone ochotensis (Fisch. ex Pritz.) Fisch.
  - Anemone okennonii Keener & B.E.Dutton
  - Anemone orthocarpa Hand.-Mazz.
  - Anemone palmata L.
  - Anemone parviflora Michx.
  - Anemone pavoniana Boiss.
  - Anemone pendulisepala Y.N.Lee
  - Anemone petiolulosa Juz.
  - Anemone poilanei Gagnep.
  - Anemone raui Goel & U.C.Bhattach.
  - Anemone robusta W.T.Wang
  - Anemone robustostylosa R.H.Miao
  - Anemone scabriuscula W.T.Wang
  - Anemone seravschanica Kom.
  - Anemone somaliensis Hepper
  - Anemone sumatrana de Vriese
  - Anemone taipaiensis W.T.Wang
  - Anemone tamarae Kharkev.
  - Anemone thomsonii Oliv.
  - Anemone tibetica W.T.Wang
  - Anemone triternata Vahl
  - Anemone truncata (H.F.Comber) Luferov
  - Anemone tschernaewii Regel
  - Anemone tuberosa Rydb.
  - Anemone virginiana L.
  - Anemone xingyiensis Q.Yuan & Q.E.Yang

== Etymology ==
According to the Oxford English Dictionary, Greek ἀνεμώνη (anemōnē) means 'daughter of the wind', from ἄνεμος (ánemos, 'wind') + feminine patronymic suffix -ώνη (-ṓnē, so 'daughter of'). Nowadays, the common name windflower is used for the entire genus.

Ovid's Metamorphoses says that the plant was created by the goddess Aphrodite when she sprinkled nectar on the blood off the body of her lover Adonis gored to death, and that nectar turning the blood into a flower. According to Ovid, the blood-red color of the anemone comes from Adonis' blood, while the name "anemone" refers to the frailty of the petals that can be easily blown away by the wind. Some versions say the flower came from the mixing with Aphrodite's tears. In other versions, the boar was sent by other jealous Greek Gods to murder Adonis. These origin stories reflect the classical dual meanings of the arrival of spring breezes and the death of a loved one. Alternatively, anemone may be derived from Nea'man, the Phoenician name for Adonis.

== Ecology ==
=== Diseases and pests ===
Anemone species are sometimes targeted by cutworms, the larvae of noctuid moths such as angle shades and heart and dart.

== Cultivation ==
Some of the species are grown in gardens. Their popularity varies by species and region. In addition to certain straight species being available, hybrids and cultivars are available for certain species. Certain species, such as Anemone coronaria, are typically only available in hybrid form while others, such as Anemonoides blanda are nearly always sold in straight species form.

Cultivated anemones are nearly always one of the following colors: bluish violet, white, pink, red, and hues in a range between violet and pink. There are no truly blue anemones, despite the frequent use of the label "blue" in marketing to describe blue-violet flowers (flowers that are more violet than blue). One species of anemone, Anemone ranunculoides, is unusual for its yellow flowers. In horticultural terms there are three main groups:

1. spring-flowering species found in woodland and alpine meadows, often tuberous or rhizomatous; e.g. Anemonoides nemorosa, Anemonoides blanda
2. spring- and summer-flowering species from hot dry areas, with tuberous roots, e.g. Anemone coronaria
3. summer- and autumn-flowering species with fibrous roots, which thrive in moist dappled shade; e.g. Eriocapitella hupehensis

The spring-flowering autumn-planted ephemeral species Anemonoides blanda is grown in large-scale commercial cultivation and can be purchased in bulk quantities. It is most commonly-available with a bluish violet flower (usually erroneously called "Blue Shades" despite its flower being more purple than blue) that varies from intense to pale, depending upon the individual plant and possibly soil conditions. A white-flowered form is the second-most common type. The least common of the commonly-cultivated forms is a pale pink. The violet, and especially pink, forms sometimes possess petals that fade to white near the flower center. The genus contains quite a number of other spring-flowering species. A. hortensis and the hybrid A. fulgens have less-divided leaves than some others and have rose-purple or scarlet flowers.

Among the most well-known anemones is A. coronaria, often called the poppy anemone. It is a tuberous-rooted plant with parsley-like divided leaves and large poppy-like blossoms on stalks of 15–20 cm (5.9–7.9 in) high. It can be planted in the fall in zones 7 or 8 without extra protection or in spring in cooler zones. If planted in fall it will flower in the spring and if planted in the spring it will flower in late summer. The flowers are typically scarlet, crimson, bluish purple, reddish purple, or white. There are also double-flowered varieties, in which the stamens in the centre are replaced by a tuft of narrow petals. It has been used as a garden plant, in hybrid form in particular, for a long time in some parts of the world. Double forms are named varieties. Hybrids of the de Caen and St. Brigid groups are the most prevalent on the market. In Palestine, large numbers of red-flowering non-hybrid A. coronaria can be seen growing in certain natural areas.

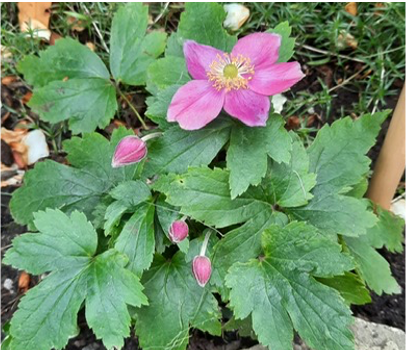
Pink anemone

Eriocapitella hupehensis, and its white cultivar 'Honorine Joubert', the latter especially, are well-known autumn-flowering selections. They often grow well in well-drained but moisture-retentive soil and reach 60–100 cm (24–39 in) in height, blooming continually for several weeks. E. hupehensis, E. vitifolia, and their hybrids and are particularly attractive to honeybees. A number of low-growing species, such as the native British Anemonoides nemorosa and Anemonoides apennina, have woodlands and other shady places as their habitat.

Garden-cultivated anemones generally grow best in a loamy well-drained evenly-moist fertile soil, although the ephemeral A. blanda does not require as much moisture during the summer when it is dormant (unlike the related Eranthis species that can suffer if they become too dry even while dormant). Some prairie species that are rarely cultivated, such as Anemone cylindrica, grow well in drier warmer conditions and poor soil. A. coronaria has been described by some professional sources as preferring acidic soil and by others as preferring alkaline soil. Hardy species may be planted in October in many zones. Unlike a hardier species such as A. blanda, A. coronaria is described as hardy only as low as climate zone 7 by some sources and by others hardy only as low as zone 8. Various strategies, such as the use of protection, can be tried to plant them outdoors in fall in zone 6 but results may vary. As with other plants, some species can be readily raised from seed while some hybrids may be sterile. A. blanda typically blooms in mid spring. The larger anemone species typically grow well in partial shade, or in full sun provided they are shielded from the hottest sun in southern areas. A well-drained soil, enriched with compost, is typically utilized.

If cut flowers are desired, it is best to harvest the flowers early in the morning while it is still cold outside while the bloom is still closed. To open your flowers place in room temperature water out of direct sun. A. coronaria blooms can be purchased from some florists, between November and June depending upon availability.

== Anemones in culture ==
"Anemone" has several different meanings depending on the culture and context in which the flower is being used. In the Victorian language of flowers, the anemone (Anemone Nemorosa) represented forsaken love, brevity, and expectation. European peasants carried them to ward off pests and disease as well as bad luck.

In other cultures, the meanings differ. In Chinese and Egyptian cultures, the flower of anemone was considered a symbol of illness due to its coloring. The anemone can be a symbol of bad luck in Eastern cultures. The Japanese anemone may be associated with ill tidings.

The flowers are featured in Robe violette et Anémones, a 1937 painting by Henri Matisse.

Anemone (2025), a psychological drama directed by Ronan Day-Lewis and starring Daniel Day-Lewis, Sean Bean and Samantha Morton—the title is a reference to the flower.

== See also ==
- Ranunculaceae

== Bibliography ==
- Ehrendorfer, Friedrich; Ziman, Svetlana N.; König, Christiane; Keener, Carl. S.; Dutton, Bryan E.; Tsarenko, Olga N.; Bulakh, Elena V.; Boşcaiu, Monica; Médail, Frédéric; Kästner, Arndt (July 2009). "Taxonomic revision, phylogenetics and transcontinental distribution of Anemone section Anemone (Ranunculaceae)". Botanical Journal of the Linnean Society. 160 (3): 312–354. doi:10.1111/j.1095-8339.2009.00861.x.
- Ziman, SN; Keener, CS; Kadota, Y; Tsarenko, OM (August 2006). "A revision of Anemone L. (Ranunculaceae) from the Southern Hemisphere" (PDF). Journal of Japanese Botany. 81 (4): 193–224. Archived from the original (PDF) on 23 March 2021.
- Ziman, SN; Bulakh, EV; Kadota, Y; Keener, CS (June 2008). "Modern view on the taxonomy of the genus Anemone L. sensu stricto (Ranunculaceae)" (PDF). Journal of Japanese Botany. 83 (3): 127–155. Archived from the original (PDF) on 23 March 2021.
- Ziman, Svetlana; Bulakh, Elena; Tsarenko, Olga (2011). "Anemone L. (Ranunculaceae): comparative morphology and taxonomy of the species from the Balkan flora" (PDF). Botanica Serbica. 35 (2): 87–97.
