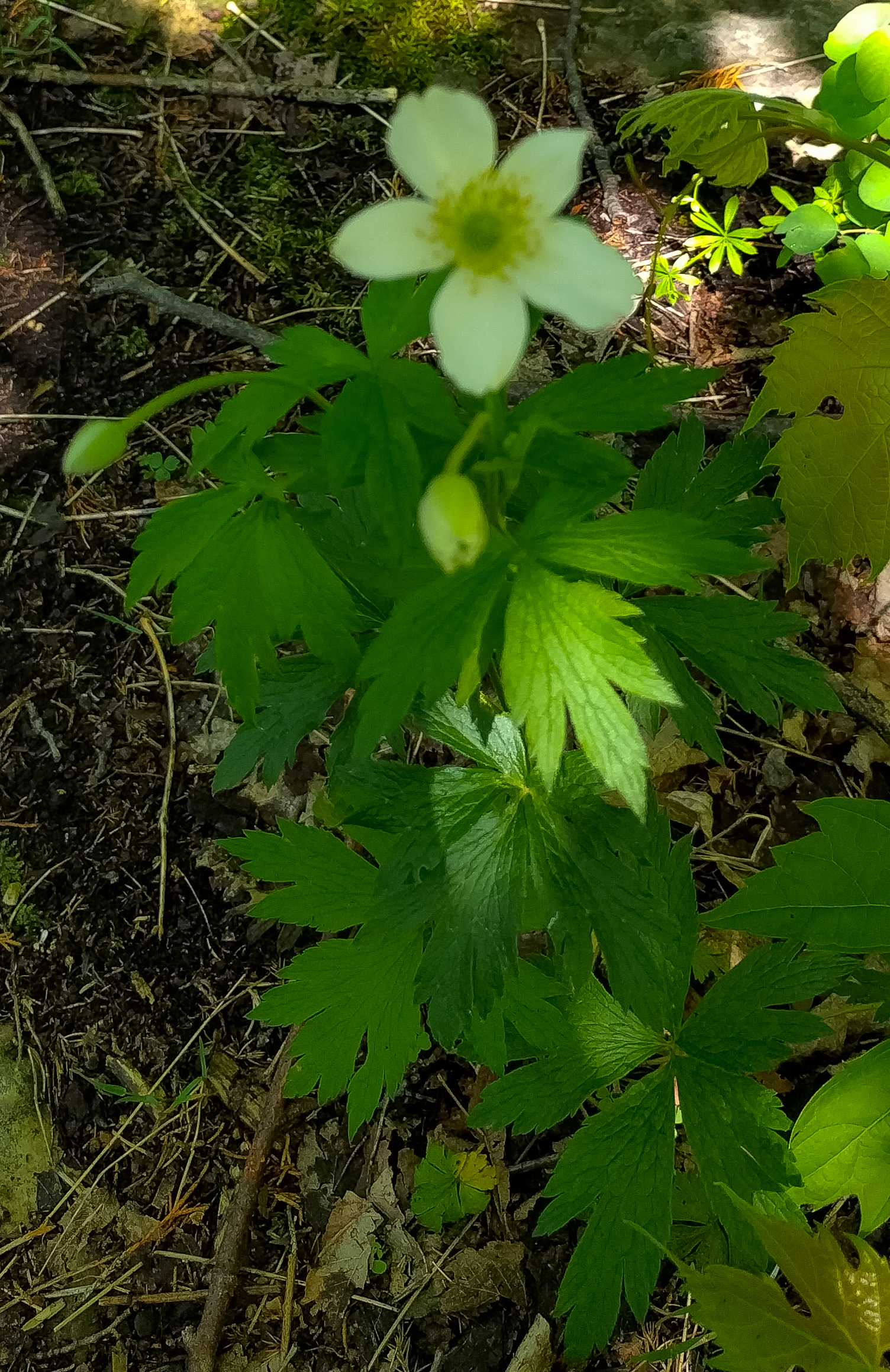

Scientific classification
- Kingdom: Plantae
- Clade: Embryophytes
- Clade: Tracheophytes
- Clade: Spermatophytes
- Clade: Angiosperms
- Clade: Eudicots
- Order: Ranunculales
- Family: Ranunculaceae
- Genus: Anemone
- Species: A. cylindrica

Binomial name
- Anemone cylindrica Gray.

= Anemone cylindrica =

Species of flowering plant in the buttercup family

Anemone cylindrica, also known as thimbleweed, is an upright growing, clump forming herbaceous species of flowering plant in the buttercup family Ranunculaceae. Plants grow 30–100 centimetres (12–39 in) tall, flowering early summer but often found flowering until late summer, the flowers are greenish-white. It is primarily self-pollinated. After flowering, the fruits are produced in a dense rounded columned spikes 20–35 millimetres (0.79–1.38 in) long. When the fruits, called achenes, are ripe they have gray-white colored, densely woolly styles, that allow them to blow away in the wind.

Anemone cylindrica is native to north central North America where it can be found growing in prairies, in dry open woods, along roadsides and in pastures.

Anemone cylindrica is one of several plants known as thimbleweed.
