= List of flora of Indiana =

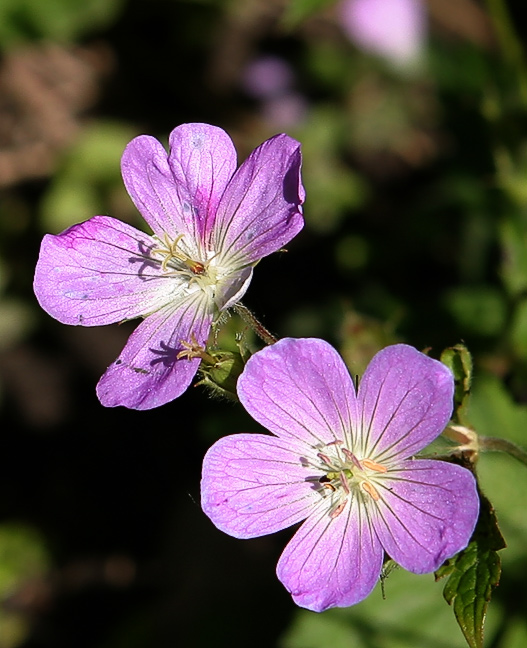
Geranium maculatum, an Indiana native, is a relative of the common bedding geranium (Pelargonium × hortorum).

This list includes plants native and introduced to the state of Indiana, designated (N) and (I), respectively. Varieties and subspecies link to their parent species.

== A ==
- Abies balsamea var. balsamea (I)
- Abutilon theophrasti (I)
- Acalypha deamii (N)
- Acalypha gracilens (N)
- Acalypha ostryifolia (N)
- Acalypha rhomboidea (N)
- Acalypha virginica (N)
- Acer campestre (I) -- field maple
- Acer × freemanii (N) -- Freeman maple
- Acer ginnala (I) -- Amur maple
- Acer negundo var. negundo (N) -- boxelder maple
- Acer negundo var. violaceum (N) --
- Acer nigrum (N) -- black maple
- Acer palmatum (I) --
- Acer pensylvanicum (N) -- striped maple, moosewood
- Acer platanoides (I) --
- Acer rubrum var. rubrum (N) -- red maple
- Acer rubrum var. trilobum (N) --
- Acer saccharinum (N) -- silver mapl
- Acer saccharum var. saccharum (N) -- sugar maple
- Acer spicatum (N) -- mountain maple, dwarf maple
- Acer tataricum (I) --
- Achillea millefolium var. occidentalis (N)
- Achillea millefolium var. millefolium (I)
- Achillea ptarmica (I)
- Achyranthes japonica var. hachijoensis (I)
- Acinos arvensis, synonym of Clinopodium acinos (I)
- Aconitum noveboracense (N)
- Aconitum uncinatum ssp. uncinatum (N)
- Acorus americanus (N)
- Acorus calamus (I)
- Acroptilon repens (I)
- Actaea pachypoda (N)
- Actaea racemosa var. racemosa (N)
- Actaea rubra ssp. rubra (N)
- Actinidia arguta (I)
- Adiantum capillus-veneris (N)
- Adiantum pedatum (N)
- Adlumia fungosa (N)
- Aegilops cylindrica (I)
- Aegopodium podagraria (I)
- Aesculus flava (N)
- Aesculus glabra var. glabra (N)
- Aesculus hippocastanum (I)
- Aesculus × marylandica (N)
- Aethusa cynapium (I)
- Agalinis auriculata (N)
- Agalinis gattingeri (N)
- Agalinis paupercula var. borealis (N)
- Agalinis paupercula var. paupercula (N)
- Agalinis purpurea (N)
- Agalinis skinneriana (N)
- Agalinis tenuifolia var. macrophylla (N)
- Agalinis tenuifolia var. parviflora (N)
- Agalinis tenuifolia var. tenuifolia (N)
- Agastache nepetoides (N)
- Agastache scrophulariifolia (N)
- Ageratina altissima var. altissima (N)
- Ageratina aromatica var. aromatica (N)
- Agrimonia eupatoria (I)
- Agrimonia gryposepala (N) -- common agrimony
- Agrimonia microcarpa (N)
- Agrimonia parviflora (N)
- Agrimonia pubescens (N)
- Agrimonia rostellata (N)
- Agrimonia striata (N)
- Agropyron desertorum (I)
- Agrostemma githago (I)
- Agrostis avenacea (I)
- Agrostis capillaris (I)
- Agrostis elliottiana (N) -- Elliott's bent grass
- Agrostis gigantea (I)
- Agrostis hyemalis (N)
- Agrostis perennans (N)
- Agrostis scabra (N)
- Agrostis stolonifera (I)
- Ailanthus altissima (I)
- Aira caryophyllea var. caryophyllea (I)
- Ajuga genevensis (I)
- Ajuga reptans (I)
- Akebia quinata (I)
- Albizia julibrissin (I)
- Alcea rosea (I)
- Aletris farinosa (N)
- Alisma subcordatum (N)
- Alisma triviale (N)
- Alliaria petiolata (I)
- Allium ampeloprasum (I)
- Allium burdickii (N)
- Allium canadense var. canadense (N)
- Allium cepa (I)
- Allium cernuum var. cernuum (N)
- Allium porrum (I)
- Allium sativum (I)
- Allium schoenoprasum (I)
- Allium schoenoprasum var. sibiricum (N)
- Allium tricoccum (N)
- Allium vineale ssp. vineale (I)
- Alnus × fallacina (N)
- Alnus glutinosa (I)
- Alnus incana ssp. rugosa (N)
- Alnus serrulata (N)
- Alopecurus aequalis var. aequalis (N)
- Alopecurus carolinianus (N)
- Alopecurus geniculatus var. geniculatus (I)
- Alopecurus myosuroides (I)
- Alopecurus myosuroides (N)
- Alopecurus pratensis (I)
- Althaea officinalis (I)
- Alyssum alyssoides (I)
- Amaranthus albus (I) -- common tumbleweed,
- Amaranthus blitoides (I) --
- Amaranthus blitum var. emarginatus (I) --
- Amaranthus cruentus (I) --
- Amaranthus deflexus (I) --
- Amaranthus hybridus (N) -- green amaranth
- Amaranthus palmeri (N) -- Palmer's pigweed
- Amaranthus powellii ssp. powellii (N) --
- Amaranthus retroflexus (N) --
- Amaranthus spinosus (N) --
- Amaranthus tuberculatus (N) --
- Ambrosia artemisiifolia var. elatior (N)
- Ambrosia artemisiifolia var. elatior (I)
- Ambrosia bidentata (N)
- Ambrosia × helenae (N)
- Ambrosia trifida var. trifida (N)
- Amelanchier arborea var. arborea (N)
- Amelanchier interior (N)
- Amelanchier laevis (N)
- Amelanchier sanguinea var. sanguinea (N)
- Amelanchier stolonifera (N)
- Ammannia coccinea (N)
- Ammannia robusta (N)
- Ammophila breviligulata (N)
- Amorpha fruticosa (N)
- Ampelopsis aconitifolia (I)
- Ampelopsis arborea (N)
- Ampelopsis glandulosa var. brevipedunculata (I)
- Ampelopsis cordata (N)
- Amphiachyris dracunculoides (N)
- Amphicarpaea bracteata var. bracteata (N)
- Amphicarpaea bracteata var. comosa (N)
- Amsinckia lycopsoides (N)
- Amsonia tabernaemontana var. salicifolia (N)
- Anagallis arvensis ssp. foemina (N)
- Anagallis arvensis ssp. arvensis (I)
- Anagallis arvensis ssp. foemina (I)
- Anagallis minima (N)
- Anaphalis margaritacea (N)
- Anchusa arvensis (I)
- Anchusa azurea (I)
- Anchusa officinalis (I)
- Andromeda polifolia var. glaucophylla (N)
- Andropogon gerardi (N)
- Andropogon glomeratus var. glomeratus (N)
- Andropogon gyrans var. gyrans (N)
- Andropogon virginicus var. virginicus (N)
- Androsace occidentalis (N)
- Anemone blanda (I)
- Anemone canadensis (N)
- Anemone cylindrica (N)
- Anemone quinquefolia var. bifolia (N)
- Anemone quinquefolia var. quinquefolia (N)
- Anemone virginiana var. virginiana (N)
- Anethum graveolens (I)
- Angelica atropurpurea (N)
- Angelica venenosa (N)
- Anoda cristata (N)
- Antennaria howellii ssp. canadensis (N)
- Antennaria howellii ssp. neodioica (N)
- Antennaria howellii ssp. petaloidea (N)
- Antennaria neglecta (N)
- Antennaria parlinii ssp. fallax (N)
- Antennaria parlinii ssp. parlinii (N)
- Antennaria plantaginifolia (N)
- Antennaria solitaria (N)
- Antennaria virginica (N)
- Anthemis arvensis (I)
- Anthemis cotula (I)
- Anthemis tinctoria (I)
- Anthoxanthum aristatum (I)
- Anthoxanthum odoratum ssp. odoratum (I)
- Anthriscus caucalis (I)
- Anthriscus sylvestris (I)
- Anthyllis vulneraria (I)
- Antirrhinum majus (I)
- Apera interrupta (I)
- Apera spica-venti (I)
- Apios americana (N)
- Apium graveolens var. dulce (N)
- Apium graveolens var. dulce (I)
- Aplectrum hyemale (N)
- Apocynum androsaemifolium (N)
- Apocynum cannabinum (N)
- Apocynum × floribundum (N)
- Aquilegia canadensis (N)
- Aquilegia vulgaris (I)
- Arabidopsis thaliana (I)
- Arabis canadensis (N)
- Arabis × divaricarpa (N)
- Arabis drummondii (N)
- Arabis glabra (N)
- Arabis hirsuta var. pycnocarpa (N)
- Arabis laevigata var. laevigata (N)
- Arabis lyrata (N)
- Arabis missouriensis (N)
- Arabis patens (N)
- Arabis shortii (N)
- Aralia elata (I)
- Aralia hispida (N)
- Aralia nudicaulis (N)
- Aralia racemosa ssp. racemosa (N)
- Aralia spinosa (N)
- Arctium lappa (I)
- Arctium minus (I)
- Arctostaphylos uva-ursi (N)
- Arenaria serpyllifolia (I)
- Arethusa bulbosa (N)
- Argemone albiflora ssp. albiflora (N)
- Argemone mexicana (N)
- Argentina anserina (N)
- Arisaema dracontium (N)
- Arisaema triphyllum ssp. pusillum (N)
- Arisaema triphyllum ssp. stewardsonii (N)
- Arisaema triphyllum ssp. triphyllum (N)
- Aristida dichotoma var. dichotoma (N)
- Aristida longespica var. geniculata (N)
- Aristida longespica var. longespica (N)
- Aristida oligantha (N)
- Aristida purpurascens var. purpurascens (N)
- Aristida ramosissima (N)
- Aristolochia clematitis (I)
- Aristolochia serpentaria (N)
- Aristolochia tomentosa (N)
- Armoracia rusticana (I)
- Arnoglossum atriplicifolium (N)
- Arnoglossum plantagineum (N)
- Arnoglossum reniforme (N)
- Arnoseris minima (I)
- Arrhenatherum elatius var. elatius (I)
- Artemisia absinthium (I)
- Artemisia annua (I)
- Artemisia biennis (N)
- Artemisia biennis var. biennis (I)
- Artemisia campestris ssp. borealis var. borealis (N)
- Artemisia campestris ssp. caudata (N)
- Artemisia gmelinii (I)
- Artemisia ludoviciana ssp. albula (N)
- Artemisia ludoviciana ssp. ludoviciana (N)
- Artemisia pontica (I)
- Artemisia stelleriana (I)
- Artemisia stelleriana (N)
- Artemisia vulgaris (N)
- Artemisia vulgaris var. vulgaris (I)
- Arthraxon hispidus (I)
- Aruncus dioicus (I)
- Aruncus dioicus var. dioicus (N)
- Arundinaria gigantea ssp. gigantea (N)
- Asarum canadense (N)
- Asclepias amplexicaulis (N) -- sand milkweed
- Asclepias exaltata (N) -- poke milkweed
- Asclepias hirtella (N) -- tall green milkweed
- Asclepias incarnata ssp. incarnata (N) -- swamp milkweed
- Asclepias purpurascens (N) -- purple milkweed
- Asclepias quadrifolia (N) -- whorled milkweed
- Asclepias sullivantii (N) -- prairie milkweed
- Asclepias syriaca (N) -- common milkweed
- Asclepias tuberosa ssp. interior (N) -- butterfly weed
- Asclepias tuberosa ssp. tuberosa (N) -- butterfly weed
- Asclepias variegata (N) -- white milkweed
- Asclepias verticillata (N) -- eastern whorled milkweed
- Asclepias viridiflora (N) -- green-flower milkweed
- Asclepias viridis (N) -- green or spider milkweed
- Asimina triloba (N)
- Asparagus officinalis (I)
- Asperugo procumbens (I)
- Asplenium bradleyi (N) -- Bradley's spleenwort or cliff spleenwort
- Asplenium × clermontiae (N)
- Asplenium × ebenoides (N)
- Asplenium × gravesii (N)
- Asplenium × herb-wagneri (N)
- Asplenium × inexpectatum (N)
- Asplenium × kentuckiense (N)
- Asplenium montanum (N)
- Asplenium pinnatifidum (N)
- Asplenium platyneuron var. platyneuron (N)
- Asplenium resiliens (N)
- Asplenium rhizophyllum (N)
- Asplenium ruta-muraria var. cryptolepis (N)
- Asplenium ruta-muraria var. lanceolum (N)
- Asplenium trichomanes ssp. quadrivalens (N)
- Asplenium trichomanes ssp. trichomanes (N)
- Asplenium × trudellii (N)
- Aster tataricus (I)
- Astragalus canadensis var. canadensis (N)
- Astragalus neglectus (N)
- Athyrium filix-femina ssp. angustum (N)
- Athyrium filix-femina ssp. asplenioides (N)
- Atriplex hortensis (I)
- Atriplex patula (I)
- Atriplex prostrata (N)
- Atriplex rosea (I)
- Aureolaria flava var. flava (N)
- Aureolaria flava var. macrantha (N)
- Aureolaria levigata (N)
- Aureolaria pedicularia var. ambigens (N)
- Aureolaria pedicularia var. pedicularia (N)
- Aureolaria virginica (N)
- Aurinia saxatilis (I)
- Avena fatua (I)
- Avena sativa (I)
- Azolla caroliniana (N)

== B ==
- Ballota nigra var. alba (I)
- Baptisia alba var. macrophylla (N)
- Baptisia australis var. australis (N)
- Baptisia tinctoria (N)
- Barbarea verna (I)
- Barbarea vulgaris (I)
- Bartonia virginica (N)
- Bassia hirsuta (I)
- Bassia scoparia (I)
- Beckmannia syzigachne (N)
- Belamcanda chinensis (I)
- Bellis perennis (I)
- Berberis × ottawensis (N)
- Berberis thunbergii (I)
- Berberis vulgaris (I)
- Berteroa incana (I)
- Besseya bullii (N)
- Betula alleghaniensis var. alleghaniensis (N) -- yellow birch
- Betula alleghaniensis var. macrolepis (N) -- yellow birch
- Betula lenta (N) -- Black birch, cherry birch
- Betula nigra (N) -- black birch, river birch or water birch
- Betula papyrifera var. papyrifera (N) -- paper birch, white birch and canoe birch
- Betula pendula (I) --
- Betula populifolia (N) -- gray or grey birch
- Betula pubescens (N) -- downy birch
- Betula pubescens ssp. pubescens (I) --
- Betula pumila var. pumila (N) --
- Betula × purpusii (N) --
- Bidens aristosa (N) -- bearded beggarticks
- Bidens beckii (N)
- Bidens bipinnata (N)
- Bidens cernua (N)
- Bidens connata (N)
- Bidens coronata (N)
- Bidens discoidea (N)
- Bidens frondosa (N)
- Bidens laevis (N)
- Bidens tripartita (N)
- Bidens vulgata (N)
- Bignonia capreolata (N)
- Blephilia ciliata (N)
- Blephilia hirsuta var. hirsuta (N)
- Boehmeria cylindrica (N)
- Boltonia asteroides var. recognita (N)
- Borago officinalis (I)
- Botrychium biternatum (N)
- Botrychium dissectum (N)
- Botrychium lanceolatum var. angustisegmentum (N)
- Botrychium matricariifolium (N)
- Botrychium multifidum (N)
- Botrychium oneidense (N)
- Botrychium simplex (N)
- Botrychium virginianum (N)
- Bouteloua curtipendula var. curtipendula (N)
- Bouteloua gracilis (N)
- Bouteloua hirsuta var. hirsuta (N)
- Brachyelytrum erectum (N)
- Brasenia schreberi (N)
- Brassica juncea (I) -- brown mustard, Chinese mustard, Indian mustard
- Brassica napus (I)
- Brassica nigra (I)
- Brassica oleracea (I)
- Brassica rapa var. amplexicaulis (I)
- Brassica rapa var. rapa (I)
- Brickellia eupatorioides var. corymbulosa (N)
- Brickellia eupatorioides var. eupatorioides (N)
- Bromus arvensis (I)
- Bromus briziformis (I)
- Bromus catharticus (I)
- Bromus ciliatus var. ciliatus (N)
- Bromus erectus (I)
- Bromus hordeaceus ssp. hordeaceus (I)
- Bromus inermis (N)
- Bromus inermis ssp. inermis var. inermis (I)
- Bromus kalmii (N)
- Bromus latiglumis (N)
- Bromus nottowayanus (N)
- Bromus pubescens (N)
- Bromus racemosus (I)
- Bromus secalinus var. secalinus (I)
- Bromus sterilis (I)
- Bromus tectorum (I)
- Broussonetia papyrifera (I)
- Browallia americana (I)
- Brunnera macrophylla (I)
- Buchnera americana (N)
- Buddleja davidii (I)
- Buglossoides arvensis (I)
- Bulbostylis capillaris ssp. capillaris (N)
- Bunias orientalis (I)
- Bupleurum lancifolium (I)
- Bupleurum rotundifolium (I)
- Butomus umbellatus (I)
- Buxus sempervirens (I)

== C ==
- Cabomba caroliniana var. caroliniana (N)
- Cakile edentula ssp. edentula var. lacustris (N)
- Cakile edentula ssp. edentula (N)
- Calamagrostis canadensis var. canadensis (N)
- Calamagrostis canadensis var. macouniana (N)
- Calamagrostis coarctata (N)
- Calamagrostis porteri ssp. insperata (N)
- Calamagrostis stricta ssp. inexpansa (N)
- Calamovilfa longifolia var. magna (N)
- Calendula officinalis (I)
- Calla palustris (N)
- Callitriche heterophylla ssp. heterophylla (N)
- Callitriche palustris (N)
- Callitriche terrestris (N)
- Calluna vulgaris (I)
- Calopogon tuberosus var. tuberosus (N)
- Caltha palustris var. palustris (N)
- Calycanthus floridus var. glaucus (N)
- Calystegia hederacea (I)
- Calystegia sepium ssp. americana (N)
- Calystegia sepium ssp. angulata (N)
- Calystegia sepium ssp. sepium (I)
- Calystegia silvatica (I)
- Calystegia silvatica ssp. fraterniflora (N)
- Calystegia spithamaea ssp. spithamaea (N)
- Camassia scilloides (N)
- Camelina microcarpa (I)
- Camelina sativa ssp. sativa (I)
- Campanula aparinoides (N)
- Campanula rapunculoides (I)
- Campanula rotundifolia (N)
- Campanula trachelium (I)
- Campanulastrum americanum (N)
- Campsis radicans (N)
- Cannabis sativa ssp. sativa var. sativa (I)
- Capsella bursa-pastoris (I)
- Cardamine angustata (N)
- Cardamine bulbifera (I)
- Cardamine bulbosa (N)
- Cardamine concatenata (N)
- Cardamine diphylla (N)
- Cardamine dissecta (N)
- Cardamine douglassii (N)
- Cardamine flexuosa (I)
- Cardamine hirsuta (I)
- Cardamine impatiens (I)
- Cardamine maxima (N)
- Cardamine parviflora var. arenicola (N)
- Cardamine pensylvanica (N)
- Cardamine pratensis var. pratensis (N)
- Cardamine rotundifolia (N)
- Cardaria draba (I)
- Cardiospermum halicacabum (I)
- Carduus acanthoides (I)
- Carduus crispus (I)
- Carduus nutans (I)
- Carex aggregata (N) --
- Carex alata (N) -- broad-winged sedge
- Carex albicans var. albicans (N) -- whitetinge sedge
- Carex albicans var. emmonsii (N) -- whitetinge sedge
- Carex albolutescens (N) -- greenish-white sedge
- Carex albursina (N) -- White Bear sedge
- Carex alopecoidea (N) -- foxtail sedge
- Carex amphibola (N) -- gray sedge
- Carex annectens (N) --
- Carex appalachica (N) --
- Carex aquatilis var. aquatilis (N) --
- Carex arctata (N) --
- Carex argyrantha (N) --
- Carex atherodes (N) --
- Carex atlantica ssp. atlantica (N) --
- Carex atlantica ssp. capillacea (N) --
- Carex aurea (N) --
- Carex bebbii (N) --
- Carex bicknellii (N) --
- Carex blanda (N) --
- Carex brevior (N) --
- Carex bromoides ssp. bromoides (N) --
- Carex brunnescens ssp. sphaerostachya (N) --
- Carex bushii (N) --
- Carex buxbaumii (N) --
- Carex canescens ssp. canescens (N) --
- Carex canescens ssp. disjuncta (N) --
- Carex careyana (N) --
- Carex caroliniana (N) --
- Carex cephaloidea (N) --
- Carex cephalophora (N) --
- Carex communis var. communis (N) --
- Carex comosa (N) --
- Carex conjuncta (N) --
- Carex conoidea (N) --
- Carex crawei (N) --
- Carex crinita var. brevicrinis (N) --
- Carex crinita var. crinita (N) --
- Carex cristatella (N) --
- Carex crus-corvi (N) --
- Carex cryptolepis (N) --
- Carex cumberlandensis (N) --
- Carex davisii (N) --
- Carex debilis var. debilis (N) --
- Carex debilis var. rudgei (N)
- Carex decomposita (N)
- Carex deweyana var. deweyana (N)
- Carex diandra (N)
- Carex digitalis var. digitalis (N)
- Carex disperma (N)
- Carex eburnea (N)
- Carex echinata ssp. echinata (N)
- Carex emoryi (N)
- Carex festucacea (N)
- Carex flava (N)
- Carex folliculata (N)
- Carex formosa (N)
- Carex frankii (N)
- Carex garberi (N)
- Carex glaucodea (N)
- Carex gracilescens (N)
- Carex gracillima (N)
- Carex granularis (N)
- Carex grayi (N)
- Carex grisea (N) --
- Carex gynandra (N) --
- Carex haydenii (N) --
- Carex hirsutella (N) --
- Carex hirtifolia (N) --
- Carex hitchcockiana (N) --
- Carex hyalinolepis (N) --
- Carex hystericina (N) --
- Carex interior (N) --
- Carex intumescens (N) --
- Carex jamesii (N) --
- Carex juniperorum (N) --
- Carex lacustris (N) --
- Carex laevivaginata (N) --
- Carex lasiocarpa var. americana (N) --
- Carex laxiculmis var. copulata (N) --
- Carex laxiculmis var. laxiculmis (N) --
- Carex laxiflora var. laxiflora (N) --
- Carex leavenworthii (N) --
- Carex leptalea ssp. leptalea (N) --
- Carex leptonervia (N) --
- Carex limosa (N) --
- Carex longii (N) --
- Carex louisianica (N) --
- Carex lucorum var. lucorum (N) --
- Carex lupuliformis (N) --
- Carex lupulina (N) --
- Carex lurida (N) --
- Carex magellanica ssp. irrigua (N) --
- Carex meadii (N) --
- Carex merritt-fernaldii (N) --
- Carex mesochorea (N) --
- Carex molesta (N)
- Carex muehlenbergii var. enervis (N)
- Carex muehlenbergii var. muehlenbergii (N)
- Carex muskingumensis (N)
- Carex nigromarginata (N)
- Carex normalis (N)
- Carex oligocarpa (N)
- Carex oligosperma var. oligosperma (N)
- Carex pallescens (N)
- Carex peckii (N)
- Carex pedunculata (N)
- Carex pellita (N)
- Carex pensylvanica (N)
- Carex planispicata (N)
- Carex plantaginea (N)
- Carex platyphylla (N)
- Carex praegracilis (N)
- Carex prairea (N)
- Carex prasina (N)
- Carex projecta (N)
- Carex pseudocyperus (N)
- Carex purpurifera (N)
- Carex radiata (N)
- Carex retroflexa (N)
- Carex retrorsa (N)
- Carex richardsonii (N)
- Carex rosea (N)
- Carex sartwellii var. sartwellii (N)
- Carex scabrata (N)
- Carex scoparia var. scoparia (N)
- Carex seorsa (N)
- Carex shortiana (N)
- Carex siccata (N)
- Carex sparganioides (N)
- Carex spicata (I)
- Carex sprengelii (N)
- Carex squarrosa (N)
- Carex sterilis (N)
- Carex stipata var. maxima (N)
- Carex stipata var. stipata (N)
- Carex straminea (N)
- Carex striatula (N)
- Carex stricta (N)
- Carex styloflexa (N)
- Carex suberecta (N)
- Carex × subimpressa (N)
- Carex × sullivantii (N)
- Carex swanii (N)
- Carex tenera (N)
- Carex tenuiflora (N)
- Carex tetanica (N)
- Carex texensis (N)
- Carex timida (N)
- Carex tonsa var. rugosperma (N)
- Carex torta (N)
- Carex tribuloides var. tribuloides (N)
- Carex trichocarpa (N)
- Carex trisperma var. trisperma (N)
- Carex tuckermanii (N)
- Carex typhina (N)
- Carex umbellata (N)
- Carex utriculata (N)
- Carex vesicaria var. monile (N)
- Carex virescens (N)
- Carex viridula ssp. viridula (N)
- Carex vulpinoidea var. vulpinoidea (N)
- Carex willdenowii (N)
- Carex woodii (N)
- Carpinus caroliniana ssp. virginiana (N)
- Carthamus tinctorius (I)
- Carum carvi (I)
- Carya alba (N)
- Carya × brownii (N)
- Carya cordiformis (N)
- Carya glabra (N)
- Carya illinoinensis (N)
- Carya laciniosa (N)
- Carya ovalis (N)
- Carya ovata (N)
- Castanea dentata (N)
- Castanea pumila var. pumila (N)
- Castilleja coccinea (N)
- Catalpa bignonioides (N)
- Catalpa ovata (I)
- Catalpa speciosa (N)
- Caulophyllum giganteum (N)
- Caulophyllum thalictroides (N)
- Ceanothus americanus (N)
- Ceanothus herbaceus (N)
- Celastrus orbiculatus (I)
- Celastrus scandens (N)
- Celosia argentea (I)
- Celtis occidentalis (N)
- Celtis tenuifolia (N)
- Cenchrus longispinus (N)
- Centaurea cyanus (I)
- Centaurea diffusa (I)
- Centaurea jacea (I)
- Centaurea nigra (I)
- Centaurea nigrescens (I)
- Centaurea phrygia (I)
- Centaurea scabiosa (I)
- Centaurea solstitialis (I)
- Centaurea stoebe ssp. micranthos (I)
- Centaurea transalpina (N)
- Centaurium erythraea (I)
- Centaurium pulchellum (I)
- Centella erecta (N)
- Cephalanthus occidentalis (N)
- Cerastium arvense (I)
- Cerastium arvense ssp. strictum (N)
- Cerastium arvense ssp. velutinum var. velutinum (N)
- Cerastium arvense ssp. velutinum (N)
- Cerastium brachypetalum (I)
- Cerastium dubium (I)
- Cerastium fontanum ssp. vulgare (I)
- Cerastium glomeratum (I)
- Cerastium nutans var. nutans (N)
- Cerastium pumilum (I)
- Cerastium semidecandrum (I)
- Cerastium tomentosum (I)
- Ceratocephala testiculata (I)
- Ceratophyllum demersum (N)
- Ceratophyllum echinatum (N)
- Cercidiphyllum japonicum (I)
- Cercis canadensis var. canadensis (N)
- Chaenomeles speciosa (I)
- Chaenorhinum minus (I)
- Chaerophyllum procumbens var. procumbens (N)
- Chaerophyllum procumbens var. shortii (N)
- Chaerophyllum tainturieri var. tainturieri (N)
- Chaiturus marrubiastrum (I)
- Chamaecrista fasciculata var. fasciculata (N)
- Chamaecrista nictitans ssp. nictitans var. nictitans (N)
- Chamaecrista nictitans ssp. nictitans (N)
- Chamaedaphne calyculata (N)
- Chamaelirium luteum (N)
- Chamaemelum mixtum (I)
- Chamaemelum nobile (I)
- Chamaesyce humistrata (N)
- Chamaesyce maculata (N)
- Chamaesyce nutans (N)
- Chamaesyce polygonifolia (N)
- Chamaesyce prostrata (N)
- Chamaesyce serpens (N)
- Chamaesyce vermiculata (N)
- Chamerion angustifolium ssp. circumvagum (N)
- Chasmanthium latifolium (N)
- Chelidonium majus var. majus (I)
- Chelone glabra (N)
- Chenopodium album var. missouriense (N)
- Chenopodium album var. album (I)
- Chenopodium ambrosioides var. ambrosioides (I)
- Chenopodium berlandieri var. bushianum (N)
- Chenopodium berlandieri var. zschackii (N)
- Chenopodium botrys (I)
- Chenopodium capitatum (N)
- Chenopodium glaucum (I)
- Chenopodium glaucum (N)
- Chenopodium humile (I)
- Chenopodium humile (N)
- Chenopodium incanum var. incanum (N)
- Chenopodium murale (I)
- Chenopodium polyspermum var. acutifolium (I)
- Chenopodium pratericola (N)
- Chenopodium pumilio (I)
- Chenopodium simplex (N)
- Chenopodium standleyanum (N)
- Chenopodium subglabrum (N)
- Chenopodium urbicum (I)
- Chenopodium vulvaria (I)
- Chimaphila maculata (N)
- Chimaphila umbellata ssp. cisatlantica (N)
- Chionanthus virginicus (N)
- Chloris verticillata (N)
- Chloris virgata (N)
- Chorispora tenella (I)
- Chrysanthemum × morifolium (I)
- Chrysogonum virginianum var. virginianum (N)
- Chrysopsis mariana (N)
- Chrysosplenium americanum (N)
- Cichorium intybus (I)
- Cicuta bulbifera (N)
- Cicuta maculata var. maculata (N)
- Cinna arundinacea (N)
- Cinna latifolia (N)
- Circaea alpina ssp. alpina (N)
- Circaea × intermedia (N)
- Circaea lutetiana ssp. canadensis (N)
- Cirsium altissimum (N) -- tall thistle or roadside thistle
- Cirsium arvense (I) -- creeping thistle
- Cirsium canescens (N) -- Platte thistle, prairie thistle
- Cirsium carolinianum (N) -- Carolina thistle, soft thistle
- Cirsium discolor (N) -- field thistle, pasture thistle
- Cirsium muticum (N) -- swamp thistle
- Cirsium pumilum (N) -- pasture thistle
- Cirsium vulgare (I) -- spear thistle, bull thistle, or common thistle
- Citrullus lanatus var. lanatus (I)
- Cladium mariscoides (N)
- Cladrastis kentukea (N)
- Clarkia pulchella (N)
- Claytonia caroliniana var. caroliniana (N)
- Claytonia virginica var. virginica (N)
- Clematis occidentalis var. occidentalis (N)
- Clematis terniflora (I)
- Clematis viorna (N)
- Clematis virginiana (N)
- Cleome hassleriana (I)
- Cleome serrulata (N)
- Clinopodium arkansanum (N)
- Clinopodium vulgare (N)
- Clintonia borealis (N)
- Clintonia umbellulata (N)
- Clitoria mariana (N)
- Coix lacryma-jobi (I)
- Collinsia verna (N)
- Collinsonia canadensis (N)
- Collinsonia verticillata (N)
- Collomia linearis (N)
- Colutea arborescens (I)
- Comandra umbellata ssp. umbellata (N)
- Comarum palustre (N)
- Commelina communis (I)
- Commelina diffusa var. diffusa (N)
- Commelina virginica (N)
- Comptonia peregrina (N)
- Conioselinum chinense (N)
- Conium maculatum (I)
- Conoclinium coelestinum (N)
- Conopholis americana (N)
- Conringia orientalis (I)
- Consolida ajacis (I)
- Consolida regalis (I)
- Convallaria majalis (I)
- Convolvulus arvensis (I)
- Conyza canadensis var. canadensis (N)
- Conyza canadensis var. pusilla (N)
- Conyza ramosissima (N)
- Coptis trifolia (N)
- Corallorhiza maculata var. maculata (N)
- Corallorhiza odontorhiza var. odontorhiza (N)
- Corallorhiza trifida (N)
- Corallorhiza wisteriana (N)
- Coreopsis grandiflora var. harveyana (N) -- large-flowered tickseed
- Coreopsis lanceolata (N) -- lance-leaved tickseed
- Coreopsis major (N) --
- Coreopsis tinctoria var. tinctoria (N) -- golden tickseed
- Coreopsis tripteris (N) -- tall tickseed
- Coreopsis verticillata (N) -- whorled tickseed
- Coriandrum sativum (I)
- Corispermum americanum var. americanum (N)
- Corispermum pallasii (I)
- Corispermum pallasii (N)
- Cornus alternifolia (N)
- Cornus amomum (N)
- Cornus × arnoldiana (N)
- Cornus canadensis (N)
- Cornus drummondii (N)
- Cornus florida (N)
- Cornus obliqua (N)
- Cornus racemosa (N)
- Cornus rugosa (N)
- Cornus sericea ssp. sericea (N)
- Coronilla scorpioides (I)
- Coronopus didymus (I)
- Corydalis aurea (N)
- Corydalis flavula (N)
- Corydalis sempervirens (N)
- Corylus americana (N)
- Corylus cornuta var. cornuta (N)
- Cosmos bipinnatus (I)
- Cotinus coggygria (I)
- Cotoneaster divaricatus (I)
- Cotoneaster simonsii (I)
- Crataegus × anomala (N)
- Crataegus apiomorpha (N)
- Crataegus arborea (N)
- Crataegus ater (N)
- Crataegus beata (N)
- Crataegus brainerdii (N)
- Crataegus calpodendron (N)
- Crataegus chrysocarpa var. chrysocarpa (N)
- Crataegus coleae (N)
- Crataegus compacta (N)
- Crataegus compta (N)
- Crataegus corusca (N)
- Crataegus crus-galli (N)
- Crataegus disperma (N)
- Crataegus dissona (N)
- Crataegus engelmannii (N)
- Crataegus flabellata (N) -- fanleaf hawthorn
- Crataegus holmesiana (N)
- Crataegus × hudsonica (N)
- Crataegus × immanis (N)
- Crataegus indicens (N)
- Crataegus intricata (N)
- Crataegus iracunda (N) -- passionate hawthorn
- Crataegus irrasa (N)
- Crataegus jesupii (N)
- Crataegus lucorum (N)
- Crataegus macrosperma (N) -- bigfruit hawthorn
- Crataegus margarettiae (N)
- Crataegus mollis (N)
- Crataegus monogyna (I)
- Crataegus nitida (N)
- Crataegus pedicellata (N)
- Crataegus pennsylvanica (N)
- Crataegus persimilis (N)
- Crataegus phaenopyrum (N)
- Crataegus pringlei (N)
- Crataegus prona (N)
- Crataegus pruinosa (N)
- Crataegus punctata (N)
- Crataegus scabrida (N)
- Crataegus schuettei (N) -- royal hawthorn
- Crataegus submollis (N)
- Crataegus suborbiculata (N)
- Crataegus succulenta (N)
- Crataegus tanuphylla (N)
- Crataegus uniflora (N)
- Crepis biennis (I)
- Crepis capillaris (I)
- Crepis nicaeensis (I)
- Crepis pulchra (I)
- Crepis setosa (I)
- Crepis tectorum (I)
- Crotalaria sagittalis (N)
- Croton capitatus var. capitatus (N)
- Croton glandulosus var. septentrionalis (N)
- Croton monanthogynus (N)
- Cruciata pedemontana (I)
- Crypsis schoenoides (I)
- Cryptotaenia canadensis (N)
- Cucumis melo (I)
- Cucumis sativus (I)
- Cucurbita foetidissima (N)
- Cucurbita maxima (I)
- Cucurbita pepo (N)
- Cucurbita pepo var. pepo (I)
- Cunila origanoides (N)
- Cuphea viscosissima (N)
- Cuscuta cephalanthi (N)
- Cuscuta compacta var. compacta (N)
- Cuscuta coryli (N)
- Cuscuta epilinum (I)
- Cuscuta epithymum (I)
- Cuscuta glomerata (N)
- Cuscuta gronovii var. gronovii (N)
- Cuscuta pentagona var. pentagona (N)
- Cuscuta polygonorum (N)
- Cuscuta suaveolens (I)
- Cyclachaena xanthifolia (N)
- Cycloloma atriplicifolium (N)
- Cydonia oblonga (I)
- Cymbalaria muralis (I)
- Cynanchum laeve (N)
- Cynanchum louiseae (I)
- Cynodon dactylon (I)
- Cynoglossum officinale (I)
- Cynoglossum virginianum var. boreale (N)
- Cynoglossum virginianum var. virginianum (N)
- Cynosurus cristatus (I)
- Cynosurus echinatus (I)
- Cyperus acuminatus (N) -- tapertip flatsedge
- Cyperus amuricus (I)
- Cyperus bipartitus (N) -- slender flatsedge, river cyperus
- Cyperus compressus (N) -- annual sedge
- Cyperus diandrus (N)
- Cyperus echinatus (N)
- Cyperus erythrorhizos (N) -- redroot flatsedge
- Cyperus esculentus (N) -- tiger nut, atadwe, yellow nutsedge, and earth almond
- Cyperus esculentus var. leptostachyus (I)
- Cyperus flavescens (N)
- Cyperus houghtonii (N)
- Cyperus iria (I) -- rice flat sedge
- Cyperus lancastriensis (N) --
- Cyperus lupulinus ssp. lupulinus (N) -- Great Plains flatsedge
- Cyperus lupulinus ssp. macilentus (N)
- Cyperus odoratus (N) -- fragrant flatsedge
- Cyperus refractus (N)
- Cyperus retrofractus (N)
- Cyperus schweinitzii (N)
- Cyperus squarrosus (N) -- bearded flatsedge
- Cyperus strigosus (N) -- false nutsedge and straw-colored flatsedge
- Cypripedium acaule (N)
- Cypripedium × andrewsii var. andrewsii (N)
- Cypripedium × andrewsii var. landonii (N)
- Cypripedium candidum (N)
- Cypripedium parviflorum var. parviflorum (N)
- Cypripedium parviflorum var. pubescens (N)
- Cypripedium reginae (N)
- Cyrtomium falcatum (I)
- Cystopteris bulbifera (N)
- Cystopteris fragilis (N)
- Cystopteris × illinoensis (N)
- Cystopteris protrusa (N)
- Cystopteris tennesseensis (N)
- Cystopteris tenuis (N)
- Cystopteris × wagneri (N)
- Cytisus scoparius var. scoparius (I)

== D ==
- Dactylis glomerata ssp. glomerata (I)
- Dactyloctenium aegyptium (I)
- Dactylorhiza viridis (N)
- Dalea leporina (N)
- Dalea purpurea var. purpurea (N)
- Dalibarda repens (N)
- Danthonia compressa (N)
- Danthonia spicata (N)
- Daphne mezereum (I)
- Dasiphora fruticosa ssp. floribunda (N)
- Dasistoma macrophylla (N)
- Datura stramonium (I)
- Datura wrightii (N)
- Daucus carota (I)
- Decodon verticillatus (N)
- Delphinium exaltatum (N)
- Delphinium tricorne (N)
- Dennstaedtia punctilobula (N)
- Deparia acrostichoides (N)
- Deschampsia cespitosa (N)
- Deschampsia danthonioides (N)
- Deschampsia flexuosa var. flexuosa (N)
- Descurainia pinnata ssp. brachycarpa (N)
- Descurainia sophia (I)
- Desmanthus illinoensis (N)
- Desmodium canadense (N)
- Desmodium canescens (N)
- Desmodium ciliare var. ciliare (N)
- Desmodium cuspidatum var. cuspidatum (N)
- Desmodium cuspidatum var. longifolium (N)
- Desmodium glutinosum (N)
- Desmodium illinoense (N)
- Desmodium laevigatum (N)
- Desmodium marilandicum (N)
- Desmodium nudiflorum (N)
- Desmodium obtusum (N)
- Desmodium paniculatum var. paniculatum (N)
- Desmodium pauciflorum (N)
- Desmodium perplexum (N)
- Desmodium rotundifolium (N)
- Desmodium sessilifolium (N)
- Desmodium viridiflorum (N)
- Dianthus armeria (I)
- Dianthus barbatus (I)
- Dianthus deltoides (I)
- Dianthus plumarius (I)
- Diarrhena americana (N)
- Diarrhena obovata (N)
- Dicentra canadensis (N)
- Dicentra cucullaria (N)
- Dicentra eximia (N)
- Dichanthelium acuminatum var. acuminatum (N)
- Dichanthelium acuminatum var. fasciculatum (N)
- Dichanthelium acuminatum var. lindheimeri (N)
- Dichanthelium boreale (N)
- Dichanthelium boscii (N)
- Dichanthelium clandestinum (N)
- Dichanthelium commutatum (N)
- Dichanthelium depauperatum (N)
- Dichanthelium dichotomum var. dichotomum (N)
- Dichanthelium latifolium (N)
- Dichanthelium laxiflorum (N)
- Dichanthelium leibergii (N)
- Dichanthelium linearifolium (N)
- Dichanthelium longiligulatum (N)
- Dichanthelium meridionale (N)
- Dichanthelium oligosanthes var. oligosanthes (N)
- Dichanthelium oligosanthes var. scribnerianum (N)
- Dichanthelium ovale var. addisonii (N)
- Dichanthelium sabulorum var. patulum (N)
- Dichanthelium sabulorum var. thinium (N)
- Dichanthelium sphaerocarpon var. isophyllum (N)
- Dichanthelium sphaerocarpon var. sphaerocarpon (N)
- Dichanthelium spretum (N)
- Dichanthelium villosissimum var. praecocius (N)
- Dichondra carolinensis (N)
- Diervilla lonicera (N)
- Digitalis grandiflora (I)
- Digitalis lanata (I)
- Digitalis lutea (I)
- Digitalis purpurea ssp. purpurea (I)
- Digitaria ciliaris (N)
- Digitaria cognata (N)
- Digitaria filiformis (N)
- Digitaria ischaemum (I)
- Digitaria sanguinalis (N)
- Diodia teres var. teres (N)
- Diodia virginiana var. virginiana (N)
- Dioscorea polystachya (I)
- Dioscorea quaternata (N)
- Dioscorea villosa (N)
- Diospyros virginiana (N)
- Diplazium pycnocarpon (N)
- Diplotaxis muralis (I)
- Diplotaxis tenuifolia (I)
- Dipsacus fullonum (I)
- Dipsacus laciniatus (I)
- Dipsacus sativus (I)
- Dirca palustris (N)
- Distichlis spicata (N)
- Dodecatheon meadia ssp. meadia (N)
- Doellingeria infirma (N)
- Doellingeria umbellata var. umbellata (N)
- Draba brachycarpa (N)
- Draba cuneifolia var. cuneifolia (N)
- Draba reptans (N)
- Draba verna (I)
- Dracocephalum parviflorum (N)
- Drosera intermedia (N)
- Drosera rotundifolia var. rotundifolia (N)
- Dryopteris × benedictii (N)
- Dryopteris × boottii (N)
- Dryopteris carthusiana (N)
- Dryopteris clintoniana (N)
- Dryopteris cristata (N)
- Dryopteris goldieana (N)
- Dryopteris intermedia (N)
- Dryopteris marginalis (N)
- Dryopteris × mickelii (N)
- Dryopteris × neowherryi (N)
- Dryopteris × pittsfordensis (N)
- Dryopteris × slossoniae (N)
- Dryopteris × triploidea (N)
- Dryopteris × uliginosa (N)
- Duchesnea indica (I)
- Dulichium arundinaceum var. arundinaceum (N)
- Dyssodia papposa (N)

== E ==
- Echinacea purpurea (N)
- Echinochloa crus-galli (I)
- Echinochloa frumentacea (I)
- Echinochloa muricata var. microstachya (N)
- Echinochloa muricata var. muricata (N)
- Echinochloa walteri (N)
- Echinocystis lobata (N)
- Echinodorus berteroi (N)
- Echium vulgare (I)
- Eclipta prostrata (N)
- Egeria densa (I)
- Elaeagnus angustifolia (I)
- Elaeagnus multiflora (I)
- Elaeagnus umbellata var. parvifolia (I)
- Elatine brachysperma (N)
- Eleocharis acicularis var. acicularis (N)
- Eleocharis compressa var. compressa (N)
- Eleocharis elliptica (N)
- Eleocharis engelmannii (N)
- Eleocharis erythropoda (N)
- Eleocharis geniculata (N)
- Eleocharis intermedia (N)
- Eleocharis obtusa (N)
- Eleocharis olivacea var. olivacea (N)
- Eleocharis ovata (N)
- Eleocharis palustris var. palustris (N)
- Eleocharis parvula (N)
- Eleocharis quadrangulata (N)
- Eleocharis quinqueflora (N)
- Eleocharis rostellata (N)
- Eleocharis tenuis var. tenuis (N)
- Eleocharis tenuis var. verrucosa (N)
- Eleocharis wolfii (N)
- Elephantopus carolinianus (N)
- Eleusine indica (I)
- Ellisia nyctelea (N)
- Elodea canadensis (N)
- Elodea nuttallii (N)
- Elymus canadensis (N)
- Elymus hystrix var. bigeloviana (N)
- Elymus hystrix var. hystrix (N)
- Elymus repens (I)
- Elymus riparius (N)
- Elymus submuticus (N)
- Elymus trachycaulus ssp. subsecundus (N)
- Elymus trachycaulus ssp. trachycaulus (N)
- Elymus villosus (N)
- Elymus virginicus var. virginicus (N)
- Enemion biternatum (N)
- Epifagus virginiana (N)
- Epigaea repens (N)
- Epilobium ciliatum ssp. ciliatum (N)
- Epilobium ciliatum ssp. glandulosum (N)
- Epilobium coloratum (N)
- Epilobium hirsutum (I)
- Epilobium leptophyllum (N)
- Epilobium parviflorum (I)
- Epilobium strictum (N)
- Epilobium × wisconsinense (N)
- Epipactis helleborine (I)
- Equisetum arvense (N)
- Equisetum × ferrissii (N)
- Equisetum fluviatile (N)
- Equisetum hyemale var. affine (N)
- Equisetum laevigatum (N)
- Equisetum × mackaii (N)
- Equisetum × nelsonii (N)
- Equisetum sylvaticum (N)
- Equisetum variegatum var. variegatum (N)
- Eragrostis capillaris (N)
- Eragrostis cilianensis (I)
- Eragrostis curvula (I)
- Eragrostis frankii (N)
- Eragrostis hirsuta (N)
- Eragrostis hypnoides (N)
- Eragrostis minor (I)
- Eragrostis pectinacea var. miserrima (N)
- Eragrostis pectinacea var. pectinacea (N)
- Eragrostis pilosa (N)
- Eragrostis spectabilis (N)
- Eragrostis trichodes (N)
- Eranthis hyemalis (I)
- Erechtites hieraciifolia var. hieraciifolia (N)
- Erica tetralix (I)
- Erigenia bulbosa (N)
- Erigeron annuus (N)
- Erigeron philadelphicus var. philadelphicus (N)
- Erigeron pulchellus var. brauniae (N)
- Erigeron pulchellus var. pulchellus (N)
- Erigeron strigosus var. strigosus (N)
- Eriocaulon aquaticum (N)
- Eriochloa contracta (N)
- Eriophorum gracile var. gracile (N)
- Eriophorum virginicum (N)
- Eriophorum viridicarinatum (N)
- Erodium cicutarium ssp. cicutarium (I)
- Erucastrum gallicum (I)
- Eryngium yuccifolium var. yuccifolium (N)
- Erysimum capitatum var. capitatum (N)
- Erysimum cheiranthoides (I)
- Erysimum inconspicuum var. inconspicuum (N)
- Erysimum repandum (I)
- Erythronium albidum (N)
- Erythronium americanum ssp. americanum (N)
- Erythronium rostratum (N)
- Eschscholzia californica ssp. californica (N)
- Eubotrys recurva (N)
- Euonymus alatus var. alatus (I)
- Euonymus americanus (N)
- Euonymus atropurpureus var. atropurpureus (N)
- Euonymus europaeus (I)
- Euonymus fortunei var. radicans (I)
- Euonymus obovatus (N)
- Eupatoriadelphus fistulosus (N)
- Eupatoriadelphus maculatus var. maculatus (N)
- Eupatorium album var. album (N)
- Eupatorium altissimum (N)
- Eupatorium godfreyanum (N) (a hybrid of Eupatorium rotundifolium and Eupatorium sessilifolium)
- Eupatorium hyssopifolium var. laciniatum (N)
- Eupatorium perfoliatum var. perfoliatum (N)
- Eupatorium purpureum var. purpureum (N)
- Eupatorium rotundifolium var. ovatum (N)
- Eupatorium rotundifolium var. rotundifolium (N)
- Eupatorium serotinum (N)
- Eupatorium sessilifolium var. sessilifolium (N)
- Euphorbia commutata (N)
- Euphorbia corollata (N)
- Euphorbia cyathophora (N)
- Euphorbia cyparissias (I)
- Euphorbia davidii (I)
- Euphorbia dentata (I)
- Euphorbia dentata var. dentata (N)
- Euphorbia esula var. esula (I)
- Euphorbia falcata (I)
- Euphorbia helioscopia (I)
- Euphorbia lathyris (I)
- Euphorbia marginata (N)
- Euphorbia peplus (I)
- Euphorbia platyphyllos (I)
- Euphorbia purpurea (N)
- Euphorbia spathulata (N)
- Eurybia divaricata (N)
- Eurybia macrophylla (N)
- Eurybia schreberi (N)
- Eurybia surculosa (N)
- Euthamia graminifolia var. graminifolia (N)
- Euthamia gymnospermoides (N)

== F ==
- Fagopyrum esculentum (I)
- Fagus grandifolia (N)
- Fagus sylvatica (I)
- Fatoua villosa (I)
- Festuca brevipila (I)
- Festuca filiformis (I)
- Festuca rubra (I)
- Festuca rubra ssp. rubra (N)
- Festuca subverticillata (N)
- Filago vulgaris (I)
- Filipendula rubra (N)
- Filipendula ulmaria ssp. ulmaria (I)
- Fimbristylis autumnalis (N)
- Fleischmannia incarnata (N)
- Floerkea proserpinacoides (N)
- Foeniculum vulgare (I)
- Fontanesia phillyreoides ssp. fortunei (I)
- Forsythia × intermedia (I)
- Forsythia suspensa (I)
- Fragaria vesca ssp. americana (N)
- Fragaria vesca ssp. vesca (N)
- Fragaria virginiana ssp. grayana (N)
- Fragaria virginiana ssp. virginiana (N)
- Frangula alnus (I)
- Frangula alnus (N)
- Frangula caroliniana (N)
- Frasera caroliniensis (N)
- Fraxinus americana (N)
- Fraxinus excelsior (I)
- Fraxinus nigra (N)
- Fraxinus pennsylvanica (N)
- Fraxinus profunda (N)
- Fraxinus quadrangulata (N)
- Froelichia floridana var. campestris (N)
- Froelichia gracilis (N)
- Fumaria officinalis ssp. officinalis (I)

== G ==
- Gaillardia pulchella var. pulchella (N)
- Galactia volubilis (N)
- Galanthus elwesii (I)
- Galanthus nivalis (I)
- Galax urceolata (N)
- Galearis spectabilis (N)
- Galeopsis bifida (I)
- Galeopsis ladanum var. ladanum (I)
- Galeopsis tetrahit var. tetrahit (I)
- Galinsoga parviflora (I)
- Galinsoga quadriradiata (I)
- Galium aparine (N)
- Galium asprellum (N)
- Galium boreale (N)
- Galium circaezans var. hypomalacum (N)
- Galium concinnum (N)
- Galium labradoricum (N)
- Galium lanceolatum (N)
- Galium mollugo (I)
- Galium obtusum ssp. obtusum (N)
- Galium odoratum (I)
- Galium palustre (N)
- Galium pilosum var. pilosum (N)
- Galium tinctorium (N)
- Galium trifidum ssp. trifidum (N)
- Galium triflorum (N)
- Galium verum var. verum (I)
- Gamochaeta purpurea (N)
- Gaultheria hispidula (N)
- Gaultheria procumbens (N)
- Gaura biennis (N)
- Gaura longiflora (N)
- Gaura mollis (N)
- Gaylussacia baccata (N)
- Genista tinctoria (I)
- Gentiana alba (N)
- Gentiana andrewsii var. andrewsii (N)
- Gentiana × billingtonii (N)
- Gentiana clausa (N)
- Gentiana puberulenta (N)
- Gentiana saponaria var. saponaria (N)
- Gentiana villosa (N)
- Gentianella quinquefolia ssp. occidentalis (N)
- Gentianopsis crinita (N)
- Gentianopsis virgata ssp. victorinii (N)
- Gentianopsis virgata ssp. virgata (N)
- Geranium bicknellii (N)
- Geranium carolinianum var. carolinianum (N)
- Geranium columbinum (I)
- Geranium dissectum (I)
- Geranium maculatum (N)
- Geranium molle (I)
- Geranium pusillum (I)
- Geranium robertianum (I)
- Geranium robertianum ssp. robertianum (N)
- Geranium sanguineum (I)
- Geum aleppicum (N)
- Geum canadense var. canadense (N)
- Geum laciniatum var. laciniatum (N)
- Geum rivale (N)
- Geum urbanum (I)
- Geum vernum (N)
- Geum virginianum (N)
- Gilia capitata ssp. capitata (N)
- Gillenia stipulata (N)
- Gillenia trifoliata (N)
- Gladiolus × gandavensis (I)
- Glandularia canadensis (N)
- Glandularia × hybrida (I)
- Glebionis segetum (I)
- Glechoma hederacea (I)
- Gleditsia triacanthos (N)
- Glyceria acutiflora (N)
- Glyceria borealis (N)
- Glyceria canadensis (N)
- Glyceria grandis var. grandis (N)
- Glyceria melicaria (N)
- Glyceria septentrionalis (N)
- Glyceria striata (N)
- Glycine max (I)
- Gnaphalium uliginosum (I)
- Gomphrena globosa (I)
- Goodyera pubescens (N)
- Goodyera repens (N)
- Goodyera tesselata (N)
- Gratiola neglecta (N)
- Gratiola virginiana var. virginiana (N)
- Gratiola viscidula (N)
- Grindelia lanceolata var. lanceolata (N)
- Grindelia squarrosa var. serrulata (N)
- Grindelia squarrosa var. squarrosa (N)
- Guizotia abyssinica (I)
- Gutierrezia texana var. texana (N)
- Gymnocarpium appalachianum (N)
- Gymnocarpium × brittonianum (N)
- Gymnocarpium dryopteris (N)
- Gymnocladus dioicus (N)
- Gymnopogon ambiguus (N)
- Gypsophila paniculata (I)
- Gypsophila scorzonerifolia (I)

== H ==
- Hackelia deflexa var. americana (N)
- Hackelia virginiana (N)
- Halesia tetraptera var. tetraptera (N)
- Hamamelis virginiana (N)
- Hasteola suaveolens (N)
- Hedeoma hispida (N)
- Hedeoma pulegioides (N)
- Hedera helix (I)
- Helenium amarum var. amarum (N)
- Helenium autumnale var. autumnale (N)
- Helenium flexuosum (N)
- Helianthemum bicknellii (N)
- Helianthemum canadense (N)
- Helianthus × ambiguus (N)
- Helianthus angustifolius (N)
- Helianthus annuus (N)
- Helianthus × brevifolius (N)
- Helianthus × cinereus (N)
- Helianthus decapetalus (N)
- Helianthus divaricatus (N)
- Helianthus × divariserratus (N)
- Helianthus × doronicoides (N)
- Helianthus giganteus (N)
- Helianthus × glaucus (N)
- Helianthus grosseserratus (N)
- Helianthus hirsutus (N)
- Helianthus × intermedius (N)
- Helianthus × kellermanii (N)
- Helianthus × laetiflorus (N)
- Helianthus × luxurians (N)
- Helianthus maximiliani (N)
- Helianthus microcephalus (N)
- Helianthus mollis (N)
- Helianthus × multiflorus (N)
- Helianthus occidentalis ssp. occidentalis (N)
- Helianthus petiolaris ssp. petiolaris (N)
- Helianthus salicifolius (N)
- Helianthus strumosus (N)
- Helianthus tuberosus (N)
- Heliopsis helianthoides var. helianthoides (N)
- Heliopsis helianthoides var. occidentalis (N)
- Heliotropium europaeum (I)
- Heliotropium indicum (I)
- Helleborus viridis (I)
- Hemerocallis fulva (I)
- Hemerocallis lilioasphodelus (I)
- Hepatica nobilis var. acuta (N)
- Hepatica nobilis var. obtusa (N)
- Heracleum maximum (N)
- Hesperis matronalis (I)
- Hesperostipa spartea (N)
- Heteranthera dubia (N)
- Heteranthera reniformis (N)
- Heterotheca camporum var. camporum (N)
- Heuchera americana var. americana (N)
- Heuchera americana var. hirsuticaulis (N)
- Heuchera americana var. hispida (N)
- Heuchera longiflora (N)
- Heuchera parviflora var. parviflora (N)
- Heuchera villosa var. villosa (N)
- Hexalectris spicata var. spicata (N)
- Hibiscus laevis (N)
- Hibiscus moscheutos (N)
- Hibiscus syriacus (I)
- Hibiscus trionum (I)
- Hieracium aurantiacum (I)
- Hieracium caespitosum (I)
- Hieracium × flagellare var. flagellare (I)
- Hieracium × floribundum (I)
- Hieracium greenii (N)
- Hieracium gronovii (N)
- Hieracium kalmii var. fasciculatum (N)
- Hieracium kalmii var. kalmii (N)
- Hieracium longipilum (N)
- Hieracium paniculatum (N)
- Hieracium pilosella var. pilosella (I)
- Hieracium piloselloides (I)
- Hieracium scabrum var. scabrum (N)
- Hieracium venosum (N)
- Hierochloe hirta ssp. arctica (N)
- Holcus lanatus (I)
- Holosteum umbellatum (I)
- Hordeum brachyantherum ssp. brachyantherum (N)
- Hordeum jubatum ssp. jubatum (N)
- Hordeum marinum ssp. gussonianum (I)
- Hordeum pusillum (N)
- Hordeum vulgare (I)
- Hosta lancifolia (I)
- Hosta ventricosa (I)
- Hottonia inflata (N)
- Houstonia caerulea (N)
- Houstonia canadensis (N)
- Houstonia longifolia (N)
- Houstonia purpurea var. calycosa (N)
- Houstonia purpurea var. purpurea (N)
- Hudsonia tomentosa var. tomentosa (N)
- Humulus japonicus (I)
- Humulus lupulus var. lupuloides (N)
- Humulus lupulus var. pubescens (N)
- Humulus lupulus var. lupulus (I)
- Huperzia × bartleyi (N)
- Huperzia × buttersii (N)
- Huperzia lucidula (N)
- Huperzia porophila (N)
- Hyacinthoides non-scripta (I)
- Hybanthus concolor (N)
- Hydrangea arborescens (N)
- Hydrastis canadensis (N)
- Hydrocotyle americana (N)
- Hydrocotyle ranunculoides (N)
- Hydrocotyle sibthorpioides (I)
- Hydrocotyle umbellata (N)
- Hydrophyllum appendiculatum (N)
- Hydrophyllum canadense (N)
- Hydrophyllum macrophyllum (N)
- Hydrophyllum virginianum var. virginianum (N)
- Hylotelephium telephioides (N)
- Hylotelephium telephium ssp. telephium (I)
- Hypericum ascyron (N)
- Hypericum boreale (N)
- Hypericum canadense (N)
- Hypericum drummondii (N)
- Hypericum ellipticum (N)
- Hypericum gentianoides (N)
- Hypericum gymnanthum (N)
- Hypericum hypericoides ssp. multicaule (N)
- Hypericum kalmianum (N)
- Hypericum majus (N)
- Hypericum mutilum (N)
- Hypericum perforatum (I)
- Hypericum prolificum (N)
- Hypericum punctatum (N)
- Hypericum sphaerocarpum (N)
- Hypericum virgatum (N)
- Hypochaeris glabra (I)
- Hypochaeris radicata (I)
- Hypoxis hirsuta (N)

== I ==
- Iberis umbellata (I)
- Ilex crenata (I)
- Ilex mucronata (N)
- Ilex opaca var. opaca (N)
- Ilex verticillata (N)
- Impatiens balsamina (I)
- Impatiens capensis (N)
- Impatiens pallida (N)
- Inula helenium (I)
- Iodanthus pinnatifidus (N)
- Ionactis linariifolius (N)
- Ipomoea coccinea (I)
- Ipomoea hederacea (I)
- Ipomoea lacunosa (N)
- Ipomoea pandurata (N)
- Ipomoea purpurea (I)
- Ipomopsis rubra (N)
- Iris brevicaulis (N)
- Iris cristata (N)
- Iris fulva (N)
- Iris germanica (I)
- Iris pseudacorus (I)
- Iris verna var. smalliana (N)
- Iris versicolor (N)
- Iris virginica var. shrevei (N)
- Isoetes appalachiana (N)
- Isoetes engelmannii (N)
- Isoetes tenella (N)
- Isotria medeoloides (N)
- Isotria verticillata (N)
- Iva annua var. annua (N)

== J ==
- Jacquemontia tamnifolia (N)
- Jeffersonia diphylla (N)
- Juglans cinerea (N)
- Juglans nigra (N)
- Juncus acuminatus (N)
- Juncus alpinoarticulatus ssp. nodulosus (N)
- Juncus anthelatus (N)
- Juncus arcticus ssp. littoralis (N)
- Juncus articulatus (N)
- Juncus biflorus (N)
- Juncus brachycarpus (N)
- Juncus brachycephalus (N)
- Juncus bufonius var. bufonius (N)
- Juncus canadensis (N)
- Juncus compressus (I)
- Juncus dichotomus (N)
- Juncus diffusissimus (N)
- Juncus dudleyi (N)
- Juncus effusus var. decipiens (N)
- Juncus effusus var. pylaei (N)
- Juncus effusus var. solutus (N)
- Juncus gerardii var. gerardii (N)
- Juncus greenei (N)
- Juncus interior var. interior (N)
- Juncus marginatus (N)
- Juncus nodosus var. nodosus (N)
- Juncus secundus (N)
- Juncus × stuckeyi (N)
- Juncus subcaudatus var. subcaudatus (N)
- Juncus tenuis (N)
- Juncus torreyi (N)
- Juniperus communis var. depressa (N)
- Juniperus virginiana var. virginiana (N)
- Justicia americana (N)

== K ==
- Kalmia latifolia (N)
- Kerria japonica (I)
- Kickxia elatine (I)
- Kickxia spuria (I)
- Koeleria macrantha (N)
- Koelreuteria paniculata (I)
- Krigia biflora var. biflora (N)
- Krigia dandelion (N)
- Krigia virginica (N)
- Kummerowia stipulacea (I)
- Kummerowia striata (I)
- Kyllinga pumila (N)

== L ==
- Lablab purpureus (I)
- Lactuca biennis (N)
- Lactuca canadensis (N)
- Lactuca floridana var. floridana (N)
- Lactuca floridana var. villosa (N)
- Lactuca hirsuta var. sanguinea (N)
- Lactuca × morssii (N)
- Lactuca saligna (I)
- Lactuca sativa (I)
- Lactuca serriola (I)
- Lactuca tatarica var. pulchella (N)
- Lamium album (I)
- Lamium amplexicaule (I)
- Lamium maculatum (I)
- Lamium purpureum var. purpureum (I)
- Laportea canadensis (N)
- Lappula squarrosa (I)
- Lapsana communis (I)
- Larix laricina (N)
- Lathyrus japonicus var. maritimus (N)
- Lathyrus japonicus var. parviflorus (N)
- Lathyrus latifolius (I)
- Lathyrus ochroleucus (N)
- Lathyrus odoratus (I)
- Lathyrus palustris (N)
- Lathyrus pratensis (I)
- Lathyrus tuberosus (I)
- Lathyrus venosus (N)
- Leavenworthia uniflora (N)
- Lechea intermedia var. intermedia (N)
- Lechea minor (N)
- Lechea mucronata (N)
- Lechea pulchella var. moniliformis (N)
- Lechea pulchella var. pulchella (N)
- Lechea racemulosa (N)
- Lechea tenuifolia (N)
- Ledum groenlandicum (N)
- Leersia lenticularis (N)
- Leersia oryzoides (N)
- Leersia virginica (N)
- Lemna minor (N)
- Lemna minuta (N)
- Lemna obscura (N)
- Lemna perpusilla (N)
- Lemna trisulca (N)
- Lemna turionifera (N)
- Lemna valdiviana (N)
- Leontodon autumnalis ssp. autumnalis (I)
- Leontodon autumnalis ssp. pratensis (I)
- Leontodon hispidus ssp. danubialis (I)
- Leontodon taraxacoides ssp. taraxacoides (I)
- Leonurus cardiaca ssp. cardiaca (I)
- Leonurus sibiricus (I)
- Lepidium campestre (I)
- Lepidium densiflorum var. densiflorum (N)
- Lepidium perfoliatum (I)
- Lepidium ramosissimum var. bourgeauanum (N)
- Lepidium ruderale (I)
- Lepidium sativum (I)
- Lepidium virginicum var. virginicum (N)
- Leptochloa fusca ssp. fascicularis (N)
- Leptochloa panicea ssp. brachiata (N)
- Lespedeza × acuticarpa (N)
- Lespedeza bicolor (I)
- Lespedeza × brittonii (N)
- Lespedeza capitata (N)
- Lespedeza cuneata (I)
- Lespedeza formosa (I)
- Lespedeza frutescens (N)
- Lespedeza hirta ssp. hirta (N)
- Lespedeza × nuttallii (N)
- Lespedeza procumbens (N)
- Lespedeza repens (N)
- Lespedeza thunbergii (I)
- Lespedeza violacea (N)
- Lespedeza virginica (N)
- Lesquerella globosa (N)
- Leucanthemum maximum (I)
- Leucanthemum vulgare (I)
- Leucojum aestivum ssp. aestivum (I)
- Leucospora multifida (N)
- Levisticum officinale (I)
- Liatris aspera var. aspera (N)
- Liatris aspera var. intermedia (N)
- Liatris cylindracea (N)
- Liatris punctata var. punctata (N)
- Liatris pycnostachya var. pycnostachya (N)
- Liatris scariosa var. nieuwlandii (N)
- Liatris spheroidea (N)
- Liatris spicata var. spicata (N)
- Liatris squarrosa var. squarrosa (N)
- Liatris squarrulosa (N)
- Ligusticum canadense (N)
- Ligustrum obtusifolium (I)
- Ligustrum ovalifolium (I)
- Ligustrum vulgare (I)
- Lilium canadense ssp. canadense (N)
- Lilium canadense ssp. editorum (N)
- Lilium lancifolium (I)
- Lilium michiganense (N)
- Lilium philadelphicum var. andinum (N)
- Lilium philadelphicum var. philadelphicum (N)
- Lilium superbum (N)
- Linaria dalmatica ssp. dalmatica (I)
- Linaria genistifolia (I)
- Linaria vulgaris (I)
- Lindera benzoin var. benzoin (N)
- Lindera benzoin var. pubescens (N)
- Lindernia dubia var. anagallidea (N)
- Lindernia dubia var. dubia (N)
- Linnaea borealis ssp. americana (N)
- Linum grandiflorum (I)
- Linum medium var. texanum (N)
- Linum perenne (I)
- Linum perenne (N)
- Linum striatum (N)
- Linum sulcatum var. sulcatum (N)
- Linum usitatissimum (I)
- Linum virginianum (N)
- Liparis liliifolia (N)
- Liparis loeselii (N)
- Lipocarpha drummondii (N)
- Lipocarpha micrantha (N)
- Liquidambar styraciflua (N)
- Liriodendron tulipifera (N)
- Lithospermum canescens (N)
- Lithospermum caroliniense var. croceum (N)
- Lithospermum latifolium (N)
- Lithospermum officinale (I)
- Lobelia cardinalis (N)
- Lobelia inflata (N)
- Lobelia kalmii (N)
- Lobelia puberula var. simulans (N)
- Lobelia siphilitica var. siphilitica (N)
- Lobelia spicata var. campanulata (N)
- Lobelia spicata var. leptostachys (N)
- Lobelia spicata var. spicata (N)
- Lobularia maritima (I)
- Lorinseria areolata (N)
- Lolium perenne ssp. multiflorum (I)
- Lolium perenne ssp. perenne (I)
- Lolium temulentum ssp. temulentum (I)
- Lonicera × bella (I)
- Lonicera canadensis (N)
- Lonicera dioica (N)
- Lonicera flava (N)
- Lonicera fragrantissima (I)
- Lonicera japonica (I)
- Lonicera × minutiflora (I)
- Lonicera morrowii (I)
- Lonicera maackii (I)
- Lonicera oblongifolia (N)
- Lonicera reticulata (N)
- Lonicera ruprechtiana (I)
- Lonicera × salicifolia (I)
- Lonicera sempervirens (N)
- Lonicera tatarica (I)
- Lonicera villosa var. tonsa (N)
- Lonicera × xylosteoides (I)
- Lonicera xylosteum (I)
- Lotus corniculatus var. corniculatus (I)
- Lotus glaber (I)
- Ludwigia alternifolia (N)
- Ludwigia decurrens (N)
- Ludwigia leptocarpa (N)
- Ludwigia palustris (N)
- Ludwigia peploides (I)
- Ludwigia peploides ssp. glabrescens (N)
- Ludwigia polycarpa (N)
- Lunaria annua (I)
- Lupinus perennis ssp. perennis var. occidentalis (N)
- Lupinus perennis ssp. perennis var. perennis (N)
- Lupinus perennis ssp. perennis (N)
- Luzula acuminata ssp. acuminata (N)
- Luzula acuminata ssp. carolinae (N)
- Luzula bulbosa (N)
- Luzula echinata (N)
- Luzula multiflora ssp. multiflora var. multiflora (N)
- Luzula multiflora ssp. multiflora (N)
- Lychnis coronaria (I)
- Lychnis flos-cuculi (I)
- Lychnis viscaria (I)
- Lycium barbarum (I)
- Lycium chinense (I)
- Lycopodiella inundata (N)
- Lycopodiella margueritiae (N)
- Lycopodiella subappressa (N)
- Lycopodium clavatum (N)
- Lycopodium dendroideum (N)
- Lycopodium digitatum (N)
- Lycopodium × habereri (N)
- Lycopodium hickeyi (N)
- Lycopodium lagopus (N)
- Lycopodium obscurum (N)
- Lycopodium tristachyum (N)
- Lycopus americanus (N)
- Lycopus asper (N)
- Lycopus europaeus (I)
- Lycopus rubellus (N)
- Lycopus × sherardii (N)
- Lycopus uniflorus var. uniflorus (N)
- Lycopus virginicus (N)
- Lycoris squamigera (I)
- Lygodium palmatum (N)
- Lyonia ligustrina var. ligustrina (N)
- Lysimachia ciliata (N)
- Lysimachia lanceolata (N)
- Lysimachia nummularia (I)
- Lysimachia × producta (N)
- Lysimachia punctata (I)
- Lysimachia quadriflora (N)
- Lysimachia quadrifolia (N)
- Lysimachia terrestris (N)
- Lysimachia thyrsiflora (N)
- Lysimachia vulgaris (I)
- Lythrum alatum var. alatum (N)
- Lythrum hyssopifolia (I)
- Lythrum portula (I)
- Lythrum salicaria (I)

== M ==
- Macleaya cordata (I)
- Maclura pomifera (N)
- Magnolia acuminata (N)
- Magnolia fraseri (N)
- Magnolia macrophylla (N)
- Magnolia × soulangeana (I)
- Magnolia stellata (I)
- Magnolia tripetala (N)
- Mahonia aquifolium (N)
- Maianthemum canadense (N)
- Maianthemum racemosum ssp. racemosum (N)
- Maianthemum stellatum (N)
- Maianthemum trifolium (N)
- Malaxis unifolia (N)
- Malus angustifolia var. angustifolia (N)
- Malus baccata (I)
- Malus coronaria (N)
- Malus floribunda (I)
- Malus ioensis var. ioensis (N)
- Malus × platycarpa (N)
- Malus pumila (I)
- Malus toringo (I)
- Malus zumi (I)
- Malva alcea (I)
- Malva moschata (I)
- Malva neglecta (I)
- Malva pusilla (I)
- Malva sylvestris (I)
- Malva verticillata (I)
- Manfreda virginica (N)
- Marrubium vulgare (I)
- Marsilea quadrifolia (I)
- Marsilea quadrifolia (N)
- Matelea obliqua (N)
- Matricaria discoidea (I)
- Matricaria recutita (I)
- Matteuccia struthiopteris (N)
- Mazus pumilus (I)
- Medeola virginiana (N)
- Medicago lupulina (I)
- Medicago polymorpha (I)
- Medicago sativa ssp. falcata (I)
- Medicago sativa ssp. sativa (I)
- Meehania cordata (N)
- Melampyrum lineare var. latifolium (N)
- Melampyrum lineare var. lineare (N)
- Melica nitens (N)
- Melilotus altissimus (I)
- Melilotus officinalis (I)
- Melissa officinalis (I)
- Menispermum canadense (N)
- Mentha aquatica (I)
- Mentha arvensis (N)
- Mentha × gracilis (I)
- Mentha × piperita (N)
- Mentha × rotundifolia (I)
- Mentha spicata (I)
- Mentha suaveolens (I)
- Mentha × villosa (I)
- Menyanthes trifoliata (N)
- Mercurialis annua (I)
- Mertensia virginica (N)
- Microstegium vimineum (I)
- Microthlaspi perfoliatum (I)
- Mikania scandens (N)
- Milium effusum var. cisatlanticum (N)
- Mimulus alatus (N)
- Mimulus ringens var. ringens (N)
- Minuartia michauxii var. michauxii (N)
- Minuartia patula (N)
- Mirabilis albida (N)
- Mirabilis hirsuta (N)
- Mirabilis jalapa (I)
- Mirabilis nyctaginea (N)
- Miscanthus sinensis (I)
- Misopates orontium (I)
- Mitchella repens (N)
- Mitella diphylla (N)
- Moehringia lateriflora (N)
- Moehringia trinervia (I)
- Mollugo verticillata (N)
- Monarda clinopodia (N)
- Monarda didyma (N)
- Monarda fistulosa ssp. fistulosa var. fistulosa (N)
- Monarda fistulosa ssp. fistulosa var. mollis (N)
- Monarda fistulosa ssp. fistulosa (N)
- Monarda media (N)
- Monarda punctata ssp. punctata var. villicaulis (N)
- Monarda punctata ssp. punctata (N)
- Moneses uniflora (N)
- Monolepis nuttalliana (N)
- Monotropa hypopithys (N)
- Monotropa uniflora (N)
- Morella pensylvanica (N)
- Morus alba (I)
- Morus nigra (I)
- Morus rubra var. rubra (N)
- Muhlenbergia asperifolia (N)
- Muhlenbergia capillaris (N)
- Muhlenbergia × curtisetosa (N)
- Muhlenbergia cuspidata (N)
- Muhlenbergia frondosa (N)
- Muhlenbergia glomerata (N)
- Muhlenbergia mexicana (N)
- Muhlenbergia schreberi (N)
- Muhlenbergia sobolifera (N)
- Muhlenbergia sylvatica (N)
- Muhlenbergia tenuiflora (N)
- Muscari armeniacum (I)
- Muscari botryoides (I)
- Muscari comosum (I)
- Muscari neglectum (I)
- Myagrum perfoliatum (I)
- Myosotis arvensis (I)
- Myosotis discolor (I)
- Myosotis laxa (N)
- Myosotis macrosperma (N)
- Myosotis scorpioides (I)
- Myosotis stricta (I)
- Myosotis sylvatica (I)
- Myosotis verna (N)
- Myosoton aquaticum (I)
- Myosurus minimus (N)
- Myriophyllum aquaticum (I)
- Myriophyllum heterophyllum (N)
- Myriophyllum humile (N)
- Myriophyllum pinnatum (N)
- Myriophyllum sibiricum (N)
- Myriophyllum spicatum (I)
- Myriophyllum verticillatum (N)

== N ==
- Najas flexilis (N)
- Najas gracillima (N)
- Najas guadalupensis ssp. guadalupensis (N)
- Najas marina (N)
- Najas minor (I)
- Napaea dioica (N)
- Narcissus × incomparabilis (I)
- Narcissus jonquilla (I)
- Narcissus × medioluteus (I)
- Narcissus poeticus (I)
- Narcissus pseudonarcissus (I)
- Nasturtium officinale (I)
- Navarretia intertexta ssp. propinqua (N)
- Nelumbo lutea (N)
- Nelumbo nucifera (I)
- Neobeckia aquatica (N)
- Neottia cordata var. cordata (N)
- Nepeta cataria (I)
- Neslia paniculata (I)
- Nicandra physalodes (I)
- Nicotiana alata (I)
- Nicotiana glauca (I)
- Nicotiana rustica (I)
- Nicotiana tabacum (I)
- Nigella damascena (I)
- Nothoscordum bivalve (N)
- Nuphar lutea ssp. advena (N)
- Nuphar lutea ssp. variegata (N)
- Nuttallanthus canadensis (N)
- Nymphaea odorata ssp. odorata (N)
- Nymphaea odorata ssp. tuberosa (N)
- Nymphoides peltata (I)
- Nyssa sylvatica (N)

== O ==
- Obolaria virginica (N)
- Oclemena acuminata (N)
- Oenanthe aquatica (I)
- Oenothera biennis (N)
- Oenothera clelandii (N)
- Oenothera fruticosa ssp. fruticosa (N)
- Oenothera fruticosa ssp. glauca (N)
- Oenothera laciniata (N)
- Oenothera nutans (N)
- Oenothera oakesiana (N)
- Oenothera parviflora (N)
- Oenothera perennis (N)
- Oenothera pilosella ssp. pilosella (N)
- Oenothera speciosa (N)
- Oenothera triloba (N)
- Oenothera villosa ssp. villosa (N)
- Oligoneuron album (N)
- Oligoneuron ohioense (N)
- Oligoneuron riddellii (N)
- Oligoneuron rigidum var. glabratum (N)
- Oligoneuron rigidum var. rigidum (N)
- Onoclea sensibilis (N)
- Onopordum acanthium (I)
- Onosmodium bejariense var. hispidissimum (N)
- Ophioglossum engelmannii (N)
- Ophioglossum pusillum (N)
- Ophioglossum vulgatum (N)
- Opuntia humifusa (N)
- Opuntia macrorhiza var. macrorhiza (N)
- Orbexilum onobrychis (N)
- Orbexilum pedunculatum var. pedunculatum (N)
- Origanum vulgare (I)
- Ornithogalum nutans (I)
- Ornithogalum umbellatum (I)
- Orobanche ludoviciana ssp. ludoviciana (N)
- Orobanche uniflora (N)
- Orthilia secunda (N)
- Oryzopsis asperifolia (N)
- Osmorhiza claytonii (N)
- Osmorhiza longistylis (N)
- Osmunda cinnamomea var. cinnamomea (N)
- Osmunda claytoniana (N)
- Osmunda regalis var. spectabilis (N)
- Ostrya virginiana var. virginiana (N)
- Oxalis corniculata (N)
- Oxalis dillenii (N)
- Oxalis grandis (N)
- Oxalis montana (N)
- Oxalis stricta (N)
- Oxalis violacea (N)
- Oxydendrum arboreum (N)
- Oxypolis rigidior (N)

== P ==
- Pachysandra terminalis (I)
- Packera anonyma (N)
- Packera aurea (N)
- Packera glabella (N)
- Packera obovata (N)
- Packera paupercula (N)
- Packera plattensis (N)
- Panax quinquefolius (N)
- Panax trifolius (N)
- Panicum anceps (N)
- Panicum capillare (N)
- Panicum dichotomiflorum var. dichotomiflorum (N)
- Panicum flexile (N)
- Panicum gattingeri (N)
- Panicum miliaceum ssp. miliaceum (I)
- Panicum philadelphicum (N)
- Panicum rigidulum var. elongatum (N)
- Panicum rigidulum var. pubescens (N)
- Panicum rigidulum var. rigidulum (N)
- Panicum verrucosum (N)
- Panicum virgatum var. virgatum (N)
- Papaver argemone (I)
- Papaver dubium (I)
- Papaver rhoeas (I)
- Papaver somniferum (I)
- Parietaria pensylvanica (N)
- Parnassia glauca (N)
- Paronychia canadensis (N)
- Paronychia fastigiata var. fastigiata (N)
- Parthenium hysterophorus (I)
- Parthenium integrifolium var. integrifolium (N)
- Parthenocissus quinquefolia (N)
- Parthenocissus tricuspidata (I)
- Parthenocissus vitacea (N)
- Pascopyrum smithii (N)
- Paspalum floridanum (N)
- Paspalum fluitans (N)
- Paspalum laeve (N)
- Paspalum pubiflorum (N)
- Paspalum setaceum (N)
- Passiflora incarnata (N)
- Passiflora lutea (N)
- Pastinaca sativa (I)
- Paulownia tomentosa (I)
- Paxistima canbyi (N)
- Pedicularis canadensis ssp. canadensis (N)
- Pedicularis lanceolata (N)
- Pellaea atropurpurea (N)
- Pellaea glabella ssp. glabella (N)
- Peltandra virginica (N)
- Pennisetum glaucum (I)
- Penstemon alluviorum (N)
- Penstemon calycosus (N)
- Penstemon canescens (N)
- Penstemon cobaea (N)
- Penstemon digitalis (N)
- Penstemon grandiflorus (N)
- Penstemon hirsutus (N)
- Penstemon laevigatus (N)
- Penstemon pallidus (N)
- Penstemon tubiflorus var. tubiflorus (N)
- Penthorum sedoides (N)
- Perideridia americana (N)
- Perilla frutescens var. frutescens (I)
- Persicaria punctata (N)
- Petasites hybridus (I)
- Petrorhagia prolifera (I)
- Petrorhagia saxifraga (I)
- Petroselinum crispum (I)
- Petunia × atkinsiana (I)
- Petunia axillaris (I)
- Phacelia bipinnatifida (N)
- Phacelia dubia var. dubia (N)
- Phacelia purshii (N)
- Phacelia ranunculacea (N)
- Phalaris arundinacea (N)
- Phalaris canariensis (I)
- Phalaris caroliniana (N)
- Phaseolus coccineus (I)
- Phaseolus polystachios var. polystachios (N)
- Phaseolus vulgaris (I)
- Phegopteris connectilis (N)
- Phegopteris hexagonoptera (N)
- Phellodendron amurense (I)
- Philadelphus coronarius (I)
- Philadelphus inodorus (N)
- Philadelphus pubescens var. pubescens (N)
- Philadelphus tomentosus (I)
- Phleum pratense (I)
- Phlox divaricata ssp. divaricata (N)
- Phlox glaberrima ssp. triflora (N)
- Phlox latifolia (N)
- Phlox maculata ssp. maculata (N)
- Phlox maculata ssp. pyramidalis (N)
- Phlox paniculata (N)
- Phlox pilosa ssp. pilosa (N)
- Phlox stolonifera (N)
- Phlox subulata ssp. brittonii (N)
- Phlox subulata ssp. subulata (N)
- Phoradendron leucarpum (N)
- Photinia floribunda (N)
- Photinia melanocarpa (N)
- Phragmites australis (N)
- Phryma leptostachya (N)
- Phyla lanceolata (N)
- Phyllanthus caroliniensis ssp. caroliniensis (N)
- Physalis alkekengi (I)
- Physalis grisea (N)
- Physalis heterophylla var. heterophylla (N)
- Physalis hispida (N)
- Physalis longifolia var. longifolia (N)
- Physalis longifolia var. subglabrata (N)
- Physalis philadelphica var. immaculata (I)
- Physalis pubescens var. integrifolia (N)
- Physalis pubescens var. pubescens (N)
- Physalis virginiana var. virginiana (N)
- Physematium obtusum ssp. obtusa (N)
- Physocarpus opulifolius var. intermedius (N)
- Physocarpus opulifolius var. opulifolius (N)
- Physostegia virginiana ssp. praemorsa (N)
- Physostegia virginiana ssp. virginiana (N)
- Phytolacca americana var. americana (N)
- Picea abies (I)
- Picris echioides (I)
- Picris hieracioides (N)
- Picris hieracioides ssp. hieracioides (I)
- Pilea fontana (N)
- Pilea pumila var. pumila (N)
- Pimpinella saxifraga ssp. saxifraga (I)
- Pinellia ternata (I)
- Pinus banksiana (N)
- Pinus echinata (N)
- Pinus nigra (I)
- Pinus rigida (N)
- Pinus strobus (N)
- Pinus sylvestris (I)
- Pinus virginiana (N)
- Piptatherum racemosum (N)
- Piptochaetium avenaceum (N)
- Pistia stratiotes (N)
- Pityopsis graminifolia var. latifolia (N)
- Plantago aristata (N)
- Plantago cordata (N)
- Plantago lanceolata (I)
- Plantago major (I)
- Plantago patagonica (N)
- Plantago psyllium (I)
- Plantago rugelii var. rugelii (N)
- Plantago virginica (N)
- Platanthera × andrewsii (N)
- Platanthera aquilonis (N)
- Platanthera blephariglottis var. blephariglottis (N)
- Platanthera ciliaris (N)
- Platanthera clavellata (N)
- Platanthera flava var. herbiola (N)
- Platanthera grandiflora (N)
- Platanthera hookeri (N)
- Platanthera lacera (N)
- Platanthera leucophaea (N)
- Platanthera orbiculata (N)
- Platanthera peramoena (N)
- Platanthera psycodes (N)
- Platanus occidentalis (N)
- Pleopeltis polypodioides ssp. michauxiana (N)
- Pluchea camphorata (N)
- Poa alsodes (N)
- Poa annua (I)
- Poa arida (N)
- Poa bulbosa (I)
- Poa chapmaniana (N)
- Poa compressa (I)
- Poa cuspidata (N)
- Poa nemoralis (N)
- Poa nemoralis ssp. nemoralis (I)
- Poa paludigena (N)
- Poa palustris (N)
- Poa pratensis (I)
- Poa pratensis ssp. pratensis (N)
- Poa saltuensis (N)
- Poa sylvestris (N)
- Poa trivialis (I)
- Poa wolfii (N)
- Podophyllum peltatum (N)
- Podostemum ceratophyllum (N)
- Pogonia ophioglossoides (N)
- Polanisia dodecandra ssp. dodecandra (N)
- Polanisia dodecandra ssp. trachysperma (N)
- Polanisia jamesii (N)
- Polemonium caeruleum (I)
- Polemonium reptans var. reptans (N)
- Polemonium reptans var. villosum (N)
- Polygala ambigua (N)
- Polygala cruciata var. aquilonia (N)
- Polygala curtissii (N)
- Polygala incarnata (N)
- Polygala paucifolia (N)
- Polygala polygama (N)
- Polygala sanguinea (N)
- Polygala senega (N)
- Polygala verticillata var. isocycla (N)
- Polygala verticillata var. verticillata (N)
- Polygonatum biflorum var. commutatum (N)
- Polygonatum pubescens (N)
- Polygonum achoreum (N)
- Polygonum amphibium var. emersum (N)
- Polygonum amphibium var. stipulaceum (N)
- Polygonum arenastrum (I)
- Polygonum arifolium (N)
- Polygonum aviculare (I)
- Polygonum buxiforme (N)
- Polygonum careyi (N)
- Polygonum cespitosum var. longisetum (I)
- Polygonum ciliinode (N)
- Polygonum convolvulus var. convolvulus (I)
- Polygonum erectum (N)
- Polygonum fowleri ssp. fowleri (N)
- Polygonum hydropiper (I)
- Polygonum hydropiperoides (N)
- Polygonum lapathifolium (N)
- Polygonum orientale (I)
- Polygonum pensylvanicum (N)
- Polygonum perfoliatum (I)
- Polygonum persicaria (I)
- Polygonum ramosissimum var. ramosissimum (N)
- Polygonum robustius (N)
- Polygonum sachalinense (I)
- Polygonum sagittatum (N)
- Polygonum scandens var. cristatum (N)
- Polygonum scandens var. dumetorum (N)
- Polygonum scandens var. scandens (N)
- Polygonum scandens var. dumetorum (I)
- Polygonum setaceum (N)
- Polygonum tenue (N)
- Polygonum virginianum (N)
- Polymnia canadensis (N)
- Polypodium appalachianum (N)
- Polypodium virginianum (N)
- Polystichum acrostichoides var. acrostichoides (N)
- Pontederia cordata (N)
- Populus alba (I)
- Populus balsamifera ssp. balsamifera (N)
- Populus × canadensis (N)
- Populus × canescens (I)
- Populus deltoides ssp. deltoides (N)
- Populus deltoides ssp. monilifera (N)
- Populus grandidentata (N)
- Populus heterophylla (N)
- Populus × jackii (N)
- Populus nigra (I)
- Populus × smithii (N)
- Populus tremuloides (N)
- Portulaca grandiflora (I)
- Portulaca oleracea (I)
- Portulaca oleracea (N)
- Potamogeton amplifolius (N)
- Potamogeton compressus (N)
- Potamogeton crispus (I)
- Potamogeton diversifolius (N)
- Potamogeton epihydrus (N)
- Potamogeton foliosus ssp. foliosus (N)
- Potamogeton friesii (N)
- Potamogeton gramineus (N)
- Potamogeton × hagstroemii (N)
- Potamogeton hillii (N)
- Potamogeton illinoensis (N)
- Potamogeton natans (N)
- Potamogeton nodosus (N)
- Potamogeton perfoliatus (N)
- Potamogeton praelongus (N)
- Potamogeton pulcher (N)
- Potamogeton pusillus ssp. pusillus (N)
- Potamogeton pusillus ssp. tenuissimus (N)
- Potamogeton × rectifolius (N)
- Potamogeton richardsonii (N)
- Potamogeton robbinsii (N)
- Potamogeton spirillus (N)
- Potamogeton strictifolius (N)
- Potamogeton tennesseensis (N)
- Potamogeton vaseyi (N)
- Potentilla argentea var. argentea (I)
- Potentilla arguta ssp. arguta (N)
- Potentilla canadensis var. canadensis (N)
- Potentilla canadensis var. villosissima (N)
- Potentilla inclinata (I)
- Potentilla intermedia (I)
- Potentilla norvegica ssp. monspeliensis (N)
- Potentilla paradoxa (N)
- Potentilla pensylvanica var. pensylvanica (N)
- Potentilla recta (I)
- Potentilla reptans (I)
- Potentilla simplex (N)
- Prenanthes alba (N)
- Prenanthes altissima (N)
- Prenanthes aspera (N)
- Prenanthes crepidinea (N)
- Prenanthes racemosa var. racemosa (N)
- Prenanthes serpentaria (N)
- Prenanthes trifoliolata (N)
- Proboscidea louisianica ssp. louisianica (N)
- Prosartes lanuginosa (N)
- Prosartes maculata (N)
- Proserpinaca palustris var. amblyogona (N)
- Proserpinaca palustris var. crebra (N)
- Prunella laciniata (I)
- Prunella vulgaris ssp. lanceolata (N)
- Prunus americana (N)
- Prunus avium (I)
- Prunus cerasifera (I)
- Prunus cerasus (I)
- Prunus domestica var. domestica (I)
- Prunus hortulana (N)
- Prunus mahaleb (I)
- Prunus mexicana (N)
- Prunus munsoniana (N)
- Prunus nigra (N)
- Prunus pensylvanica var. pensylvanica (N)
- Prunus persica var. persica (I)
- Prunus pumila var. pumila (N)
- Prunus serotina var. serotina (N)
- Prunus subhirtella (I)
- Prunus susquehanae (N) (here considered a synonym of P. pumila)
- Prunus tomentosa (I)
- Prunus virginiana var. virginiana (N)
- Psammophiliella muralis (syn. Gypsophila muralis) (I)
- Pseudognaphalium macounii (N)
- Pseudognaphalium obtusifolium ssp. obtusifolium (N)
- Pseudolysimachion longifolium (I)
- Ptelea trifoliata ssp. trifoliata var. trifoliata (N)
- Ptelea trifoliata ssp. trifoliata (N)
- Pteridium aquilinum var. latiusculum (N)
- Pteridium aquilinum var. pseudocaudatum (N)
- Puccinellia distans (N)
- Puccinellia distans ssp. distans (I)
- Pueraria montana var. lobata (I)
- Pycnanthemum incanum var. incanum (N)
- Pycnanthemum incanum var. puberulum (N)
- Pycnanthemum muticum (N)
- Pycnanthemum pycnanthemoides var. pycnanthemoides (N)
- Pycnanthemum tenuifolium (N)
- Pycnanthemum verticillatum var. pilosum (N)
- Pycnanthemum verticillatum var. verticillatum (N)
- Pycnanthemum virginianum (N)
- Pyracantha coccinea (I)
- Pyracantha coccinea (N)
- Pyrola americana (N)
- Pyrola asarifolia ssp. asarifolia (N)
- Pyrola chlorantha (N)
- Pyrola elliptica (N)
- Pyrus calleryana (I)
- Pyrus communis (I)

== Q ==
- Quercus alba (N)
- Quercus × bebbiana (N)
- Quercus bicolor (N)
- Quercus × bushii (N)
- Quercus coccinea var. coccinea (N)
- Quercus coccinea var. tuberculata (N)
- Quercus × deamii (N)
- Quercus ellipsoidalis (N)
- Quercus × exacta (N)
- Quercus falcata (N)
- Quercus × fontana (N)
- Quercus × hawkinsiae (N)
- Quercus imbricaria (N)
- Quercus × jackiana (N)
- Quercus × leana (N)
- Quercus macrocarpa var. macrocarpa (N)
- Quercus marilandica var. marilandica (N)
- Quercus muehlenbergii (N)
- Quercus × mutabilis (N)
- Quercus × palaeolithicola (N)
- Quercus palustris (N)
- Quercus prinus (N)
- Quercus robur (I)
- Quercus rubra var. ambigua (N)
- Quercus rubra var. rubra (N)
- Quercus × runcinata (N)
- Quercus × saulii (N)
- Quercus × schuettei (N)
- Quercus shumardii var. schneckii (N)
- Quercus shumardii var. shumardii (N)
- Quercus stellata (N)
- Quercus × tridentata (N)
- Quercus velutina (N)

== R ==
- Ranunculus abortivus (N)
- Ranunculus acris var. acris (N)
- Ranunculus acris var. acris (I)
- Ranunculus allegheniensis (N)
- Ranunculus ambigens (N)
- Ranunculus arvensis (I)
- Ranunculus bulbosus (I)
- Ranunculus fascicularis (N)
- Ranunculus ficaria var. bulbifera (I)
- Ranunculus flabellaris (N)
- Ranunculus hispidus var. caricetorum (N)
- Ranunculus hispidus var. hispidus (N)
- Ranunculus hispidus var. nitidus (N)
- Ranunculus longirostris (N)
- Ranunculus micranthus (N)
- Ranunculus parviflorus (I)
- Ranunculus pensylvanicus (N)
- Ranunculus pusillus var. pusillus (N)
- Ranunculus recurvatus var. recurvatus (N)
- Ranunculus repens (I)
- Ranunculus sceleratus var. sceleratus (N)
- Raphanus raphanistrum (I)
- Raphanus sativus (I)
- Ratibida columnifera (N)
- Ratibida pinnata (N)
- Reseda alba (I)
- Reseda lutea (I)
- Reseda luteola (I)
- Reynoutria japonica (syn. Polygonum cuspidatum) (I)
- Rhamnus alnifolia (N)
- Rhamnus cathartica (I)
- Rhamnus davurica ssp. davurica (I)
- Rhamnus lanceolata ssp. glabrata (N)
- Rhamnus lanceolata ssp. lanceolata (N)
- Rhamnus utilis (I)
- Rheum rhabarbarum (I)
- Rhexia virginica (N)
- Rhododendron calendulaceum (N)
- Rhododendron maximum (N)
- Rhododendron periclymenoides (N)
- Rhododendron prinophyllum (N)
- Rhodotypos scandens (I)
- Rhus aromatica var. arenaria (N)
- Rhus aromatica var. aromatica (N)
- Rhus copallinum var. latifolia (N)
- Rhus glabra (N)
- Rhus pulvinata (N)
- Rhus typhina (N)
- Rhynchospora alba (N)
- Rhynchospora capillacea (N)
- Rhynchospora capitellata (N)
- Rhynchospora recognita (N)
- Ribes americanum (N)
- Ribes aureum var. villosum (N)
- Ribes cynosbati (N)
- Ribes glandulosum (N)
- Ribes hirtellum (N)
- Ribes missouriense (N)
- Ribes nigrum (I)
- Ribes oxyacanthoides ssp. oxyacanthoides (N)
- Ribes rotundifolium (N)
- Ribes rubrum (I)
- Ribes triste (N)
- Ribes uva-crispa var. sativum (I)
- Ricinus communis (I)
- Robinia × ambigua (N)
- Robinia hispida var. fertilis (N)
- Robinia hispida var. hispida (N)
- Robinia pseudoacacia (N)
- Robinia viscosa var. viscosa (N)
- Rorippa palustris ssp. fernaldiana (N)
- Rorippa palustris ssp. hispida (N)
- Rorippa sessiliflora (N)
- Rorippa sylvestris (I)
- Rosa arkansana var. suffulta (N)
- Rosa blanda var. blanda (N)
- Rosa canina (I)
- Rosa carolina var. carolina (N)
- Rosa centifolia (I)
- Rosa cinnamomea (I)
- Rosa eglanteria (I)
- Rosa gallica (I)
- Rosa majalis (I)
- Rosa micrantha (I)
- Rosa multiflora (I)
- Rosa nitida (N)
- Rosa × palustriformis (N)
- Rosa palustris (N)
- Rosa pimpinellifolia (I)
- Rosa × rudiuscula (N)
- Rosa rugosa (I)
- Rosa setigera var. setigera (N)
- Rosa setigera var. tomentosa (N)
- Rosa wichuraiana (I)
- Rotala ramosior (N)
- Rubus aboriginum (N)
- Rubus allegheniensis var. allegheniensis (N)
- Rubus allegheniensis var. gravesii (N)
- Rubus alumnus (N)
- Rubus argutus (N)
- Rubus armeniacus (I)
- Rubus baileyanus (N)
- Rubus bellobatus (N)
- Rubus canadensis (N)
- Rubus deamii (N)
- Rubus depavitus (N)
- Rubus fecundus (N)
- Rubus flagellaris (N)
- Rubus frondosus (N)
- Rubus hispidus (N)
- Rubus idaeus ssp. strigosus (N)
- Rubus idaeus ssp. idaeus (I)
- Rubus invisus (N)
- Rubus laciniatus (I)
- Rubus laudatus (N)
- Rubus meracus (N)
- Rubus michiganensis (N)
- Rubus multifer (N)
- Rubus occidentalis (N)
- Rubus odoratus var. odoratus (N)
- Rubus pensilvanicus (N)
- Rubus pergratus (N)
- Rubus philadelphicus (N)
- Rubus phoenicolasius (I)
- Rubus plicatifolius (N)
- Rubus prestonensis (N)
- Rubus pubescens var. pubescens (N)
- Rubus recurvans (N)
- Rubus recurvicaulis (N)
- Rubus roribaccus (N)
- Rubus rosa (N)
- Rubus setosus (N)
- Rubus suus (N)
- Rubus trivialis (N)
- Rubus uvidus (N)
- Rubus vagus (N)
- Rudbeckia fulgida var. deamii (N)
- Rudbeckia fulgida var. fulgida (N)
- Rudbeckia fulgida var. speciosa (N)
- Rudbeckia fulgida var. umbrosa (N)
- Rudbeckia grandiflora var. grandiflora (N)
- Rudbeckia hirta var. hirta (N)
- Rudbeckia hirta var. pulcherrima (N)
- Rudbeckia laciniata var. laciniata (N)
- Rudbeckia triloba var. triloba (N)
- Ruellia caroliniensis ssp. caroliniensis var. caroliniensis (N)
- Ruellia caroliniensis ssp. caroliniensis (N)
- Ruellia humilis (N)
- Ruellia strepens (N)
- Rumex acetosa (N)
- Rumex acetosa ssp. acetosa (I)
- Rumex acetosella (I)
- Rumex × acutus (I)
- Rumex × acutus (N)
- Rumex altissimus (N)
- Rumex conglomeratus (I)
- Rumex crispus ssp. crispus (I)
- Rumex maritimus (N)
- Rumex obtusifolius (I)
- Rumex orbiculatus var. borealis (N)
- Rumex orbiculatus var. orbiculatus (N)
- Rumex patientia (I)
- Rumex salicifolius var. mexicanus (N)
- Rumex verticillatus (N)
- Ruppia cirrhosa (N)

== S ==
- Sabatia angularis (N)
- Saccharum alopecuroides (N)
- Saccharum ravennae (I)
- Sagina decumbens ssp. decumbens (N)
- Sagina japonica (I)
- Sagina procumbens (I)
- Sagina procumbens (N)
- Sagittaria australis (N)
- Sagittaria brevirostra (N)
- Sagittaria calycina var. calycina (N)
- Sagittaria cuneata (N)
- Sagittaria graminea var. graminea (N)
- Sagittaria latifolia (N)
- Sagittaria platyphylla (N)
- Sagittaria rigida (N)
- Salicornia depressa (N)
- Salix alba (I)
- Salix amygdaloides (N)
- Salix bebbiana (N)
- Salix candida (N)
- Salix caprea (I)
- Salix caroliniana (N)
- Salix cinerea (I)
- Salix discolor (N)
- Salix × ehrhartiana (I)
- Salix × ehrhartiana (N)
- Salix eriocephala (N)
- Salix fragilis (I)
- Salix × glatfelteri (N)
- Salix humilis var. humilis (N)
- Salix humilis var. tristis (N)
- Salix interior (N)
- Salix lucida ssp. lucida (N)
- Salix matsudana (I)
- Salix myricoides var. albovestita (N)
- Salix myricoides var. myricoides (N)
- Salix nigra (N)
- Salix pedicellaris (N)
- Salix × pendulina (I)
- Salix pentandra (I)
- Salix petiolaris (N)
- Salix purpurea (I)
- Salix × rubens (I)
- Salix sericea (N)
- Salix serissima (N)
- Salix viminalis (I)
- Salsola collina (I)
- Salsola tragus (I)
- Salvia azurea var. grandiflora (N)
- Salvia coccinea (N)
- Salvia farinacea (N)
- Salvia lyrata (N)
- Salvia officinalis (I)
- Salvia pratensis (I)
- Salvia reflexa (N)
- Salvia splendens (I)
- Salvia × superba (I)
- Salvia × sylvestris (I)
- Sambucus nigra (I)
- Sambucus nigra ssp. canadensis (N)
- Sambucus racemosa var. racemosa (N)
- Samolus valerandi (I)
- Samolus valerandi ssp. parviflorus (N)
- Sanguinaria canadensis (N)
- Sanguisorba canadensis (N)
- Sanguisorba minor ssp. balearica (I)
- Sanicula canadensis var. canadensis (N)
- Sanicula canadensis var. grandis (N)
- Sanicula marilandica (N)
- Sanicula odorata (N)
- Sanicula smallii (N)
- Sanicula trifoliata (N)
- Saponaria officinalis (I)
- Sarracenia purpurea ssp. purpurea (N)
- Sassafras albidum (N)
- Satureja hortensis (I)
- Saururus cernuus (N)
- Saxifraga pensylvanica (N)
- Saxifraga virginiensis var. virginiensis (N)
- Scabiosa columbaria (I)
- Scandix pecten-veneris (I)
- Schedonorus phoenix (I)
- Schedonorus pratensis (I)
- Scheuchzeria palustris ssp. americana (N)
- Schizachne purpurascens (N)
- Schizachyrium littorale (N)
- Schizachyrium scoparium var. scoparium (N)
- Schoenoplectus acutus var. acutus (N)
- Schoenoplectus fluviatilis (N)
- Schoenoplectus pungens var. pungens (N)
- Schoenoplectus purshianus (N)
- Schoenoplectus saximontanus (N)
- Schoenoplectus smithii (N)
- Schoenoplectus subterminalis (N)
- Schoenoplectus tabernaemontani (N)
- Schoenoplectus torreyi (N)
- Scilla siberica (I)
- Scirpus atrovirens (N)
- Scirpus cyperinus (N)
- Scirpus expansus (N)
- Scirpus georgianus (N)
- Scirpus hattorianus (N)
- Scirpus pedicellatus (N)
- Scirpus pendulus (N)
- Scirpus polyphyllus (N)
- Scleranthus annuus (I)
- Scleria oligantha (N)
- Scleria pauciflora var. caroliniana (N)
- Scleria pauciflora var. pauciflora (N)
- Scleria triglomerata (N)
- Scleria verticillata (N)
- Sclerochloa dura (I)
- Sclerochloa dura (N)
- Scrophularia lanceolata (N)
- Scrophularia marilandica (N)
- Scutellaria elliptica var. elliptica (N)
- Scutellaria elliptica var. hirsuta (N)
- Scutellaria galericulata (N)
- Scutellaria incana var. incana (N)
- Scutellaria integrifolia (N)
- Scutellaria lateriflora var. lateriflora (N)
- Scutellaria nervosa (N)
- Scutellaria ovata ssp. ovata (N)
- Scutellaria parvula var. missouriensis (N)
- Scutellaria parvula var. parvula (N)
- Scutellaria saxatilis (N)
- Scutellaria serrata (N)
- Secale cereale (I)
- Securigera varia (I)
- Sedum acre (I)
- Sedum album (I)
- Sedum dendroideum (I)
- Sedum pulchellum (N)
- Sedum reflexum (I)
- Sedum sarmentosum (I)
- Sedum sexangulare (I)
- Sedum ternatum (N)
- Selaginella apoda (N)
- Selaginella eclipes (N)
- Selaginella rupestris (N)
- Senecio sylvaticus (I)
- Senecio vulgaris (I)
- Senna hebecarpa (N)
- Senna marilandica (N)
- Sericocarpus asteroides (N)
- Sericocarpus linifolius (N)
- Sesamum orientale (I)
- Setaria faberi (I)
- Setaria italica (I)
- Setaria parviflora (N)
- Setaria pumila ssp. pumila (I)
- Setaria verticillata (I)
- Setaria viridis var. viridis (I)
- Shepherdia canadensis (N)
- Sherardia arvensis (I)
- Sibara virginica (N)
- Sicyos angulatus (N)
- Sida hermaphrodita (N)
- Sida spinosa (N)
- Silene antirrhina (N)
- Silene armeria (I)
- Silene caroliniana ssp. pensylvanica (N)
- Silene caroliniana ssp. wherryi (N)
- Silene conica (I)
- Silene csereii (I)
- Silene dichotoma (I)
- Silene dioica (I)
- Silene latifolia ssp. alba (I)
- Silene nivea (N)
- Silene noctiflora (I)
- Silene nutans (I)
- Silene regia (N)
- Silene rotundifolia (N)
- Silene stellata (N)
- Silene virginica var. virginica (N)
- Silene vulgaris (I)
- Silphium laciniatum var. laciniatum (N)
- Silphium perfoliatum var. perfoliatum (N)
- Silphium terebinthinaceum var. luciae-brauniae (N)
- Silphium terebinthinaceum var. terebinthinaceum (N)
- Silphium trifoliatum var. latifolium (N)
- Silphium trifoliatum var. trifoliatum (N)
- Silybum marianum (I)
- Sinapis alba (I)
- Sinapis arvensis ssp. arvensis (I)
- Sisymbrium altissimum (I)
- Sisymbrium irio (I)
- Sisymbrium loeselii (I)
- Sisymbrium officinale (I)
- Sisyrinchium albidum (N)
- Sisyrinchium angustifolium (N)
- Sisyrinchium atlanticum (N)
- Sisyrinchium montanum var. crebrum (N)
- Sisyrinchium mucronatum (N)
- Sium suave (N)
- Smallanthus uvedalia (N)
- Smilax ecirrhata (N)
- Smilax glauca (N)
- Smilax herbacea (N)
- Smilax illinoensis (N)
- Smilax lasioneura (N)
- Smilax pulverulenta (N)
- Smilax rotundifolia (N)
- Smilax tamnoides (N)
- Solanum carolinense var. carolinense (N)
- Solanum dulcamara var. dulcamara (I)
- Solanum lycopersicum var. lycopersicum (I)
- Solanum physalifolium (I)
- Solanum ptychanthum (N)
- Solanum rostratum (N)
- Solanum triflorum (N)
- Solanum tuberosum (I)
- Solidago altissima (N)
- Solidago arguta var. arguta (N)
- Solidago bicolor (N)
- Solidago caesia (N)
- Solidago canadensis var. canadensis (N)
- Solidago canadensis var. gilvocanescens (N)
- Solidago canadensis var. hargeri (N)
- Solidago erecta (N)
- Solidago flexicaulis (N)
- Solidago gigantea (N)
- Solidago hispida var. hispida (N)
- Solidago juncea (N)
- Solidago nemoralis var. nemoralis (N)
- Solidago odora var. odora (N)
- Solidago patula var. patula (N)
- Solidago puberula var. puberula (N)
- Solidago rugosa ssp. aspera (N)
- Solidago rugosa ssp. rugosa var. rugosa (N)
- Solidago rugosa ssp. rugosa var. villosa (N)
- Solidago rugosa ssp. rugosa (N)
- Solidago rupestris (N)
- Solidago sempervirens var. sempervirens (N)
- Solidago speciosa var. rigidiuscula (N)
- Solidago speciosa var. speciosa (N)
- Solidago sphacelata (N)
- Solidago squarrosa (N)
- Solidago uliginosa var. linoides (N)
- Solidago uliginosa var. uliginosa (N)
- Solidago ulmifolia var. ulmifolia (N)
- Sonchus arvensis ssp. arvensis (I)
- Sonchus arvensis ssp. uliginosus (I)
- Sonchus asper (I)
- Sonchus oleraceus (I)
- Sorbaria sorbifolia (I)
- Sorbus aucuparia (I)
- Sorbus decora (N)
- Sorghastrum nutans (N)
- Sorghum bicolor ssp. bicolor (I)
- Sorghum halepense (I)
- Sparganium americanum (N)
- Sparganium androcladum (N)
- Sparganium emersum (I)
- Sparganium emersum (N)
- Sparganium eurycarpum (N)
- Spartina pectinata (N)
- Spergula arvensis (I)
- Spergularia maritima (I)
- Spergularia rubra (I)
- Spergularia salina (N)
- Spermacoce glabra (N)
- Sphenopholis intermedia (N)
- Sphenopholis nitida (N)
- Sphenopholis obtusata (N)
- Sphenopholis × pallens (N)
- Sphenopholis pensylvanica (N)
- Spinacia oleracea (I)
- Spiraea alba var. alba (N)
- Spiraea alba var. latifolia (N)
- Spiraea japonica var. fortunei (I)
- Spiraea prunifolia (I)
- Spiraea tomentosa (N)
- Spiraea × vanhouttei (I)
- Spiraea virginiana (N)
- Spiranthes cernua (N)
- Spiranthes lacera var. gracilis (N)
- Spiranthes lacera var. lacera (N)
- Spiranthes lucida (N)
- Spiranthes magnicamporum (N)
- Spiranthes ochroleuca (N)
- Spiranthes ovalis var. erostellata (N)
- Spiranthes romanzoffiana (N)
- Spiranthes tuberosa (N)
- Spiranthes vernalis (N)
- Spirodela polyrrhiza (N)
- Sporobolus compositus var. compositus (N)
- Sporobolus cryptandrus (N)
- Sporobolus heterolepis (N)
- Sporobolus neglectus (N)
- Sporobolus vaginiflorus var. ozarkanus (N)
- Sporobolus vaginiflorus var. vaginiflorus (N)
- Stachys aspera (N)
- Stachys cordata (N)
- Stachys germanica (I)
- Stachys palustris (N)
- Stachys pilosa var. arenicola (N)
- Stachys sylvatica (I)
- Stachys tenuifolia (N)
- Staphylea trifolia (N)
- Stellaria alsine (N)
- Stellaria corei (N)
- Stellaria graminea (I)
- Stellaria holostea (I)
- Stellaria longifolia var. longifolia (N)
- Stellaria media ssp. media (I)
- Stellaria media ssp. pallida (I)
- Stellaria pubera (N)
- Stenanthium gramineum var. gramineum (N)
- Stenanthium gramineum var. robustum (N)
- Stenaria nigricans var. nigricans (N)
- Stenosiphon linifolius (N)
- Streptopus lanceolatus var. lanceolatus (N)
- Streptopus lanceolatus var. roseus (N)
- Strophostyles helvola (N)
- Strophostyles leiosperma (N)
- Strophostyles umbellata (N)
- Stuckenia filiformis ssp. alpina (N)
- Stuckenia pectinata (N)
- Stuckenia vaginata (N)
- Stylophorum diphyllum (N)
- Stylosanthes biflora (N)
- Styphnolobium japonicum (I)
- Styrax americanus (N)
- Styrax grandifolius (N)
- Suaeda calceoliformis (N)
- Sullivantia sullivantii (N)
- Symphoricarpos albus var. albus (N)
- Symphoricarpos albus var. laevigatus (N)
- Symphoricarpos occidentalis (N)
- Symphoricarpos orbiculatus (N)
- Symphyotrichum boreale (N)
- Symphyotrichum ciliatum (N)
- Symphyotrichum cordifolium (N)
- Symphyotrichum drummondii var. drummondii (N)
- Symphyotrichum dumosum var. strictior (N)
- Symphyotrichum ericoides var. ericoides (N)
- Symphyotrichum laeve var. laeve (N)
- Symphyotrichum lanceolatum ssp. lanceolatum var. hirsuticaule (N)
- Symphyotrichum lanceolatum ssp. lanceolatum var. interior (N)
- Symphyotrichum lanceolatum ssp. lanceolatum var. lanceolatum (N)
- Symphyotrichum lanceolatum ssp. lanceolatum var. latifolium (N)
- Symphyotrichum lanceolatum ssp. lanceolatum (N)
- Symphyotrichum lateriflorum var. lateriflorum (N)
- Symphyotrichum lowrieanum (N)
- Symphyotrichum novae-angliae (N)
- Symphyotrichum oblongifolium (N)
- Symphyotrichum ontarionis (N)
- Symphyotrichum oolentangiense var. oolentangiense (N)
- Symphyotrichum patens var. patens (N)
- Symphyotrichum phlogifolium (N)
- Symphyotrichum pilosum var. pilosum (N)
- Symphyotrichum pilosum var. pringlei (N)
- Symphyotrichum praealtum var. praealtum (N)
- Symphyotrichum prenanthoides (N)
- Symphyotrichum puniceum var. puniceum (N)
- Symphyotrichum racemosum (N)
- Symphyotrichum sericeum (N)
- Symphyotrichum shortii (N)
- Symphyotrichum subulatum (N)
- Symphyotrichum undulatum (N)
- Symphyotrichum urophyllum (N)
- Symphytum asperum (I)
- Symphytum officinale (I)
- Symplocarpus foetidus (N)
- Synandra hispidula (N)
- Syringa vulgaris (I)

== T ==
- Taenidia integerrima (N)
- Tagetes erecta (I)
- Tagetes patula (I)
- Tamarix chinensis (I)
- Tanacetum balsamita (I)
- Tanacetum coccineum (I)
- Tanacetum parthenium (I)
- Tanacetum vulgare (I)
- Taraxacum laevigatum (I)
- Taraxacum officinale (N)
- Taraxacum officinale ssp. officinale (I)
- Taxodium distichum (N)
- Taxus canadensis (N)
- Taxus cuspidata (I)
- Tephrosia virginiana (N)
- Tetradium daniellii (I)
- Tetragonia tetragonioides (I)
- Tetraneuris herbacea (N)
- Teucrium canadense var. canadense (N)
- Teucrium canadense var. occidentale (N)
- Thalictrum dasycarpum (N)
- Thalictrum dioicum (N)
- Thalictrum pubescens (N)
- Thalictrum revolutum (N)
- Thalictrum thalictroides (N)
- Thaspium barbinode (N)
- Thaspium trifoliatum var. aureum (N)
- Thaspium trifoliatum var. trifoliatum (N)
- Thelypteris noveboracensis (N)
- Thelypteris palustris var. pubescens (N)
- Thlaspi alliaceum (I)
- Thlaspi arvense (I)
- Thuja occidentalis (N)
- Thymelaea passerina (I)
- Thymelaea passerina (N)
- Thymus praecox ssp. arcticus (I)
- Tiarella cordifolia var. cordifolia (N)
- Tilia americana var. americana (N)
- Tilia americana var. heterophylla (N)
- Tilia × europaea (I)
- Tipularia discolor (N)
- Torilis arvensis ssp. arvensis (N)
- Torilis arvensis ssp. arvensis (I)
- Torilis japonica (I)
- Torreyochloa pallida var. pallida (N)
- Toxicodendron radicans ssp. negundo (N)
- Toxicodendron rydbergii (N)
- Toxicodendron vernix (N)
- Tradescantia ohiensis (N)
- Tradescantia subaspera var. subaspera (N)
- Tradescantia virginiana (N)
- Tragopogon dubius (I)
- Tragopogon lamottei (I)
- Tragopogon porrifolius (I)
- Triadenum fraseri (N)
- Triadenum tubulosum (N)
- Triadenum virginicum (N)
- Triadenum walteri (N)
- Triantha glutinosa (N)
- Tribulus terrestris (I)
- Trichomanes boschianum (N)
- Trichomanes intricatum (N)
- Trichophorum planifolium (N)
- Trichostema brachiatum (N)
- Trichostema dichotomum (N)
- Trichostema setaceum (N)
- Tridens flavus var. flavus (N)
- Trientalis borealis ssp. borealis (N)
- Trifolium ambiguum (I)
- Trifolium arvense (I)
- Trifolium aureum (I)
- Trifolium campestre (I)
- Trifolium dubium (I)
- Trifolium hybridum (I)
- Trifolium incarnatum (I)
- Trifolium pratense (I)
- Trifolium reflexum (N)
- Trifolium repens (I)
- Trifolium resupinatum (I)
- Trifolium stoloniferum (N)
- Triglochin maritima (N)
- Triglochin palustris (N)
- Trillium cernuum (N)
- Trillium erectum (N)
- Trillium flexipes (N)
- Trillium grandiflorum (N)
- Trillium nivale (N)
- Trillium recurvatum (N)
- Trillium sessile (N)
- Trillium undulatum (N)
- Triodanis perfoliata (N)
- Triosteum angustifolium (N)
- Triosteum aurantiacum var. aurantiacum (N)
- Triosteum aurantiacum var. glaucescens (N)
- Triosteum aurantiacum var. illinoense (N)
- Triosteum perfoliatum (N)
- Triphora trianthophora (N)
- Triplasis purpurea (N)
- Tripleurospermum maritimum (N)
- Tripleurospermum maritimum ssp. maritimum (I)
- Tripsacum dactyloides (N)
- Triticum aestivum (I)
- Trollius laxus ssp. laxus (N)
- Tsuga canadensis (N)
- Tulipa gesneriana (I)
- Tussilago farfara (I)
- Typha angustifolia (I)
- Typha angustifolia (N)
- Typha × glauca (N)
- Typha latifolia (N)

== U ==
- Ulmus americana (N)
- Ulmus procera (I)
- Ulmus pumila (I)
- Ulmus rubra (N)
- Ulmus thomasii (N)
- Urtica chamaedryoides (N)
- Urtica dioica ssp. gracilis (N)
- Urtica dioica ssp. dioica (I)
- Utricularia cornuta (N)
- Utricularia geminiscapa (N)
- Utricularia gibba (N)
- Utricularia intermedia (N)
- Utricularia macrorhiza (N)
- Utricularia minor (N)
- Uvularia grandiflora (N)
- Uvularia perfoliata (N)
- Uvularia sessilifolia (N)

== V ==
- Vaccaria hispanica (I)
- Vaccinium angustifolium (N)
- Vaccinium corymbosum (N)
- Vaccinium fuscatum (N)
- Vaccinium macrocarpon (N)
- Vaccinium myrtilloides (N)
- Vaccinium oxycoccos (N)
- Vaccinium pallidum (N)
- Vaccinium simulatum (N)
- Vaccinium stamineum (N)
- Valeriana edulis var. ciliata (N)
- Valeriana officinalis (I)
- Valeriana pauciflora (N)
- Valeriana uliginosa (N)
- Valerianella chenopodiifolia (N)
- Valerianella locusta (I)
- Valerianella radiata (N)
- Valerianella umbilicata (N)
- Vallisneria americana (N)
- Veratrum virginicum (N)
- Veratrum viride (N)
- Veratrum woodii (N)
- Verbascum blattaria (I)
- Verbascum phlomoides (I)
- Verbascum phoeniceum (I)
- Verbascum thapsus (I)
- Verbascum virgatum (I)
- Verbena bracteata (N)
- Verbena × engelmannii (N)
- Verbena hastata var. hastata (N)
- Verbena × moechina (N)
- Verbena simplex (N)
- Verbena stricta (N)
- Verbena urticifolia var. leiocarpa (N)
- Verbena urticifolia var. urticifolia (N)
- Verbesina alternifolia (N)
- Verbesina helianthoides (N)
- Verbesina occidentalis (N)
- Verbesina virginica var. virginica (N)
- Vernonia arkansana (N)
- Vernonia fasciculata ssp. fasciculata (N)
- Vernonia gigantea ssp. gigantea (N)
- Vernonia × illinoensis (N)
- Vernonia missurica (N)
- Vernonia noveboracensis (N)
- Veronica agrestis (I)
- Veronica americana (N)
- Veronica anagallis-aquatica (N)
- Veronica arvensis (I)
- Veronica austriaca ssp. teucrium (I)
- Veronica beccabunga (I)
- Veronica chamaedrys (I)
- Veronica filiformis (I)
- Veronica hederifolia (I)
- Veronica officinalis var. officinalis (I)
- Veronica peregrina ssp. peregrina (N)
- Veronica peregrina ssp. xalapensis (N)
- Veronica persica (I)
- Veronica polita (I)
- Veronica scutellata (N)
- Veronica serpyllifolia (N)
- Veronica serpyllifolia ssp. serpyllifolia (I)
- Veronica verna (I)
- Veronicastrum virginicum (N)
- Viburnum acerifolium (N)
- Viburnum buddleifolium (I)
- Viburnum dentatum var. dentatum (N)
- Viburnum dentatum var. venosum (N)
- Viburnum lantana (I)
- Viburnum lantanoides (N)
- Viburnum lentago (N)
- Viburnum molle (N)
- Viburnum nudum var. cassinoides (N)
- Viburnum opulus var. americanum (N)
- Viburnum opulus var. opulus (I)
- Viburnum plicatum (I)
- Viburnum prunifolium (N)
- Viburnum rafinesqueanum (N)
- Viburnum recognitum (N)
- Viburnum × rhytidophylloides (I)
- Viburnum rufidulum (N)
- Vicia americana ssp. americana (N)
- Vicia caroliniana (N)
- Vicia cracca ssp. cracca (I)
- Vicia hirsuta (I)
- Vicia sativa ssp. nigra (I)
- Vicia sativa ssp. sativa (I)
- Vicia tetrasperma (I)
- Vicia villosa ssp. varia (I)
- Vicia villosa ssp. villosa (I)
- Vigna unguiculata (I)
- Vinca major (I)
- Vinca minor (I)
- Viola affinis (N)
- Viola arvensis (I)
- Viola × bernardii (N)
- Viola bicolor (N)
- Viola × bissellii (N)
- Viola blanda var. blanda (N)
- Viola blanda var. palustriformis (N)
- Viola × brauniae (N)
- Viola canadensis var. canadensis (N)
- Viola × conjugens (N)
- Viola × consobrina (N)
- Viola × cooperrideri (N)
- Viola × cordifolia (N)
- Viola cucullata (N)
- Viola × eclipes (N)
- Viola × filicetorum (N)
- Viola hastata (N)
- Viola hirsutula (N)
- Viola labradorica (N)
- Viola lanceolata ssp. lanceolata (N)
- Viola macloskeyi ssp. pallens (N)
- Viola × malteana (N)
- Viola missouriensis (N)
- Viola nephrophylla (N)
- Viola odorata (I)
- Viola × palmata (N)
- Viola pedata (N)
- Viola pedatifida (N)
- Viola × populifolia (N)
- Viola × primulifolia (N)
- Viola pubescens var. pubescens (N)
- Viola pubescens var. scabriuscula (N)
- Viola × ravida (N)
- Viola rostrata (N)
- Viola rotundifolia (N)
- Viola sagittata var. ovata (N)
- Viola sagittata var. sagittata (N)
- Viola selkirkii (N)
- Viola × slavinii (N)
- Viola sororia (N)
- Viola striata (N)
- Viola tricolor (I)
- Viola triloba var. dilatata (N)
- Viola triloba var. triloba (N)
- Viola tripartita (N)
- Viola walteri (N)
- Viola × wittrockiana (I)
- Vitex negundo var. heterophylla (I)
- Vitis aestivalis var. aestivalis (N)
- Vitis aestivalis var. bicolor (N)
- Vitis cinerea var. baileyana (N)
- Vitis labrusca (N)
- Vitis riparia (N)
- Vitis vulpina (N)
- Vittaria appalachiana (N)
- Vulpia bromoides (I)
- Vulpia myuros (I)
- Vulpia octoflora var. glauca (N)

== W ==
- Waldsteinia fragarioides ssp. fragarioides (N)
- Wisteria floribunda (I)
- Wisteria frutescens (N)
- Wolffia borealis (N)
- Wolffia brasiliensis (N)
- Wolffia columbiana (N)
- Wolffiella gladiata (N)
- Woodsia ilvensis (N)
- Woodwardia virginica (N)

== X ==
- Xanthium spinosum (I)
- Xanthium strumarium var. canadense (N)
- Xanthium strumarium var. glabratum (N)
- Xanthorhiza simplicissima (N)
- Xyris difformis var. difformis (N)
- Xyris torta (N)

== Y ==
- Yucca filamentosa (N)

== Z ==
- Zannichellia palustris (N)
- Zanthoxylum americanum (N)
- Zea mays ssp. mays (I)
- Zelkova serrata (I)
- Zigadenus elegans ssp. glaucus (N)
- Zizania aquatica var. aquatica (N)
- Zizania palustris var. interior (N)
- Zizia aptera (N)
- Zizia aurea (N)

== See also ==
- Flora
- Flora of the United States
