= Helianthus × brevifolius =

Scientific classification
- Kingdom: Plantae
- Clade: Tracheophytes
- Clade: Angiosperms
- Clade: Eudicots
- Clade: Asterids
- Order: Asterales
- Family: Asteraceae
- Tribe: Heliantheae
- Genus: Helianthus
- Species: H. × brevifolius

Binomial name
- Helianthus × brevifolius (E.Watson) R.C.Jacks. & Guard

Synonyms
- Helianthus brevifolius

Species of daisy

Helianthus × brevifolius is a hybrid perennial species of sunflower in the family Asteraceae. It is native to N. Central & NE. U.S.A., including Ohio.

The hybrid formula is H. grosseserratus × H. mollis.
