= Cyperus amuricus =

Scientific classification
- Kingdom: Plantae
- Clade: Tracheophytes
- Clade: Angiosperms
- Clade: Monocots
- Clade: Commelinids
- Order: Poales
- Family: Cyperaceae
- Genus: Cyperus
- Species: C. amuricus

Binomial name
- Cyperus amuricus Maxim.

Species of sedge

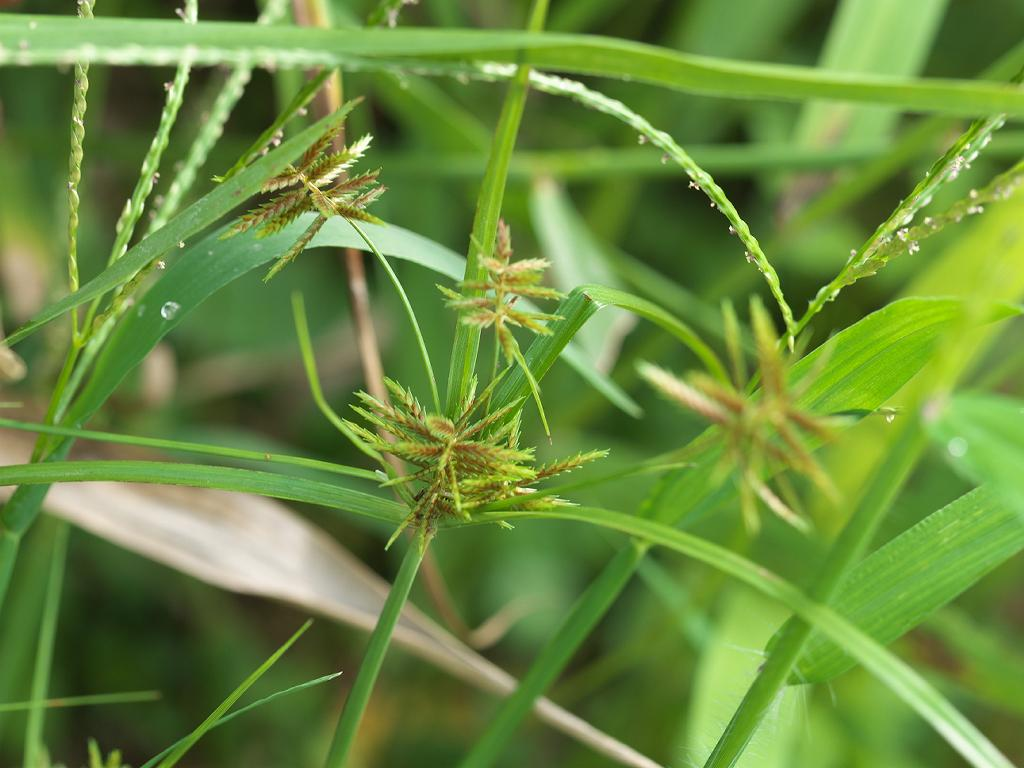

Cyperus amuricus, commonly known as the Asian flatsedge, is a species of sedge that is native to parts of Asia.

== See also ==
- List of Cyperus species
