= Cyperus retrofractus =

Scientific classification
- Kingdom: Plantae
- Clade: Tracheophytes
- Clade: Angiosperms
- Clade: Monocots
- Clade: Commelinids
- Order: Poales
- Family: Cyperaceae
- Genus: Cyperus
- Species: C. retrofractus

Binomial name
- Cyperus retrofractus (L.) Torr.

Species of sedge

Cyperus retrofractus is a species of sedge that is native to eastern parts of the United States.

== Taxonomy ==
Cyperus retrofractus was first described as Scirpus retrofractus by the Swedish botanist Carl Linnaeus in 1753. The American botanist John Torrey moved the species to genus Cyperus in 1843. Torrey referred to the species as the bent-flowered galingale. As of February 2026, the botanical name Cyperus retrofractus (L.) Torr. is widely accepted.

== See also ==
- List of Cyperus species

== Bibliography ==
- Torrey, John (1843). Flora of the State of New York. Vol. 2. Albany: Carroll and Cook.
