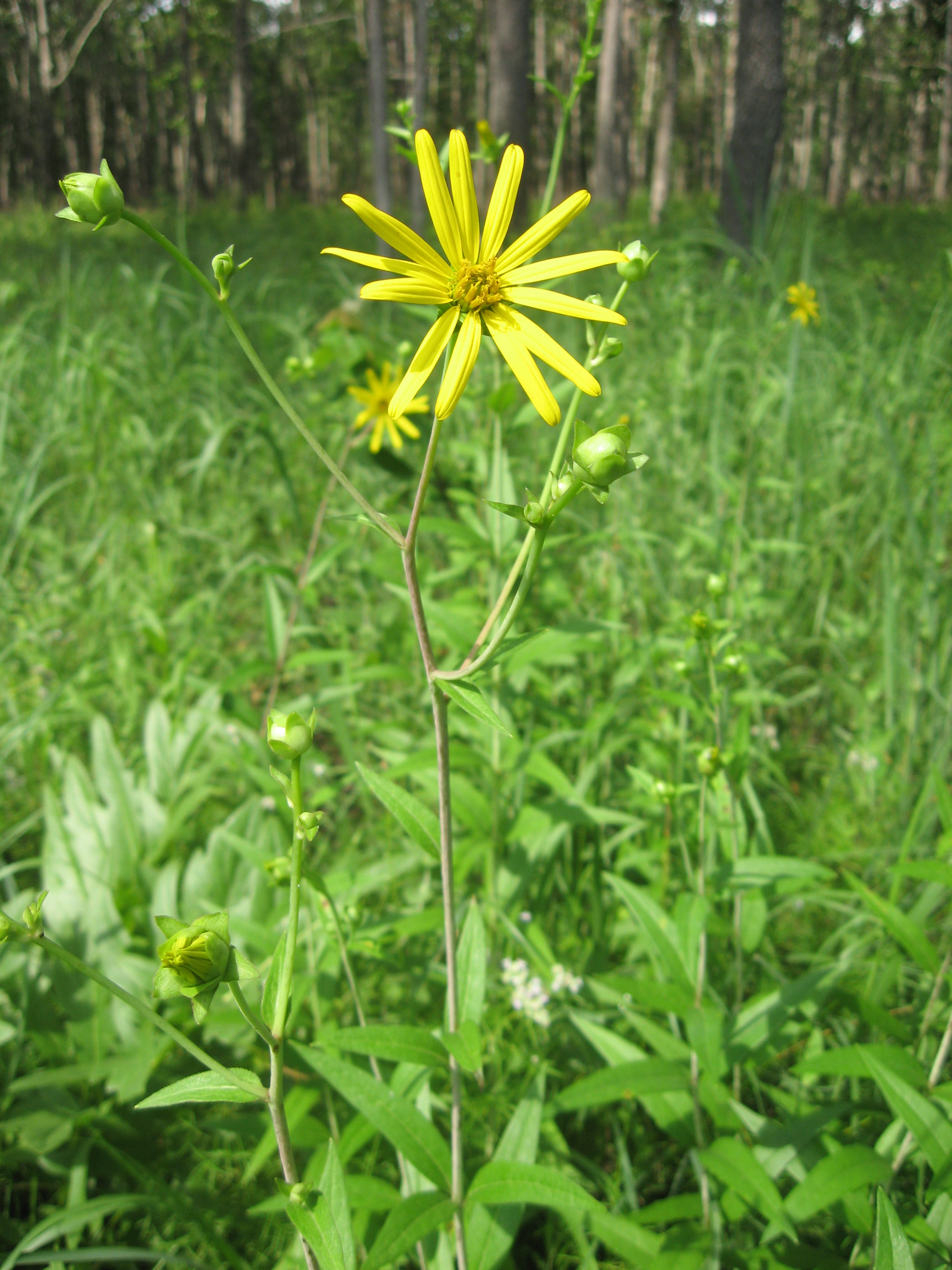

Scientific classification
- Kingdom: Plantae
- Clade: Tracheophytes
- Clade: Angiosperms
- Clade: Eudicots
- Clade: Asterids
- Order: Asterales
- Family: Asteraceae
- Tribe: Heliantheae
- Genus: Silphium
- Species: S. asteriscus

Binomial name
- Silphium asteriscus L. Clevenger

= Silphium trifoliatum =

Species of flowering plant

Silphium asteriscus var. trifoliatum (L.) Clevinger , commonly known as whorled rosinweed, is a species of flowering plant in the family Asteraceae. It is native to the eastern United States, where it is found east of the Mississippi River. Its natural habitat is open, grassy areas such as prairies, river cobble bars, and roadsides. It is a tall perennial that produces heads of yellow flowers in mid-summer through fall.

It can be distinguished by its smooth stems and leaves that are often in whorls of three. In contrast, S. asteriscus has scabrous to hispid stems and leaves, which are opposite or alternate. In addition, S. astericus has eglandular pales (the bracts in the flower heads), while the pales of S. asteriscus are often glandular. There remains much disagreement about the best taxonomic treatment of the S. asteriscus complex.
