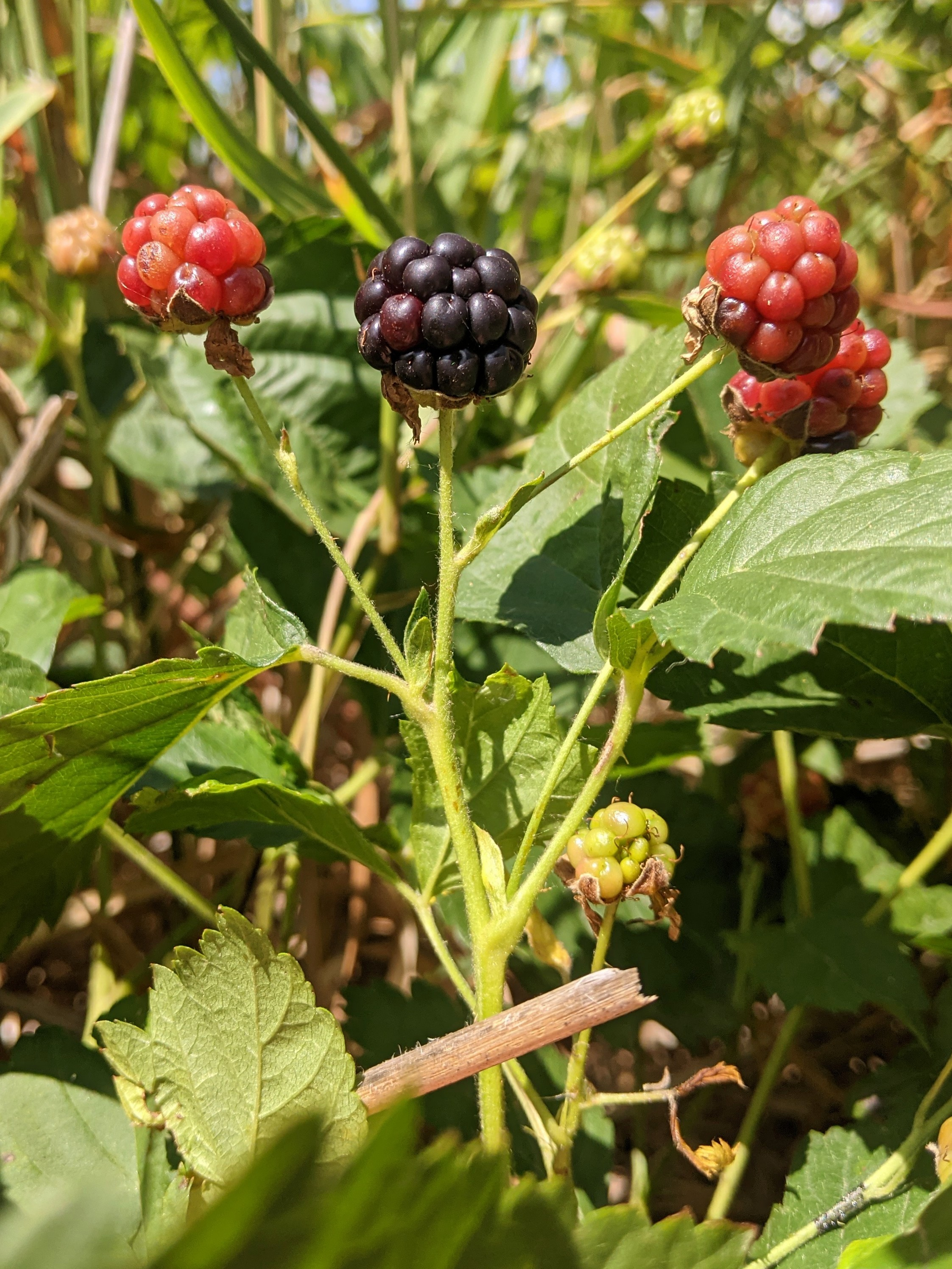
- The floricane and flowers of Rubus multifer

Scientific classification
- Kingdom: Plantae
- Clade: Tracheophytes
- Clade: Angiosperms
- Clade: Eudicots
- Clade: Rosids
- Order: Rosales
- Family: Rosaceae
- Genus: Rubus
- Species: R. multifer

Binomial name
- Rubus multifer L.H.Bailey 1943

Synonyms
- Rubus polybotrys L.H.Bailey

= Rubus multifer =

Berry and plant

Rubus multifer is a North American species of dewberry in the genus Rubus, a member of the rose family. It is commonly known as Kinnikinnick dewberry and fruitful dewberry. It has a limited global distribution with its population center in east-central Minnesota and western Wisconsin.
