= Carex cumberlandensis =

Scientific classification
- Kingdom: Plantae
- Clade: Tracheophytes
- Clade: Angiosperms
- Clade: Monocots
- Clade: Commelinids
- Order: Poales
- Family: Cyperaceae
- Genus: Carex
- Species: C. cumberlandensis

Binomial name
- Carex cumberlandensis Naczi, Kral & Bryson

Species of plant

Carex cumberlandensis is a tussock-forming species of perennial sedge in the family Cyperaceae. It is native to eastern parts of the United States. It is referred to in common usage as cumberland sedge.

Carex cumberlandensis was first identified at Mt. Cuba Center. When it was identified, it was initially named Carex digitalis.

It is most common in the Cumberland Mountains and Plateau in KY, TN, and AL.

== See also ==
- List of Carex species
