= Rubus meracus =

Scientific classification
- Kingdom: Plantae
- Clade: Tracheophytes
- Clade: Angiosperms
- Clade: Eudicots
- Clade: Rosids
- Order: Rosales
- Family: Rosaceae
- Genus: Rubus
- Species: R. meracus

Binomial name
- Rubus meracus L.H.Bailey 1943

Synonyms
- Rubus tantulus L.H.Bailey

Species of fruit and plant

Rubus meracus is a North American species of dewberry in the genus Rubus, a member of the rose family. It grows throughout the central United States.
