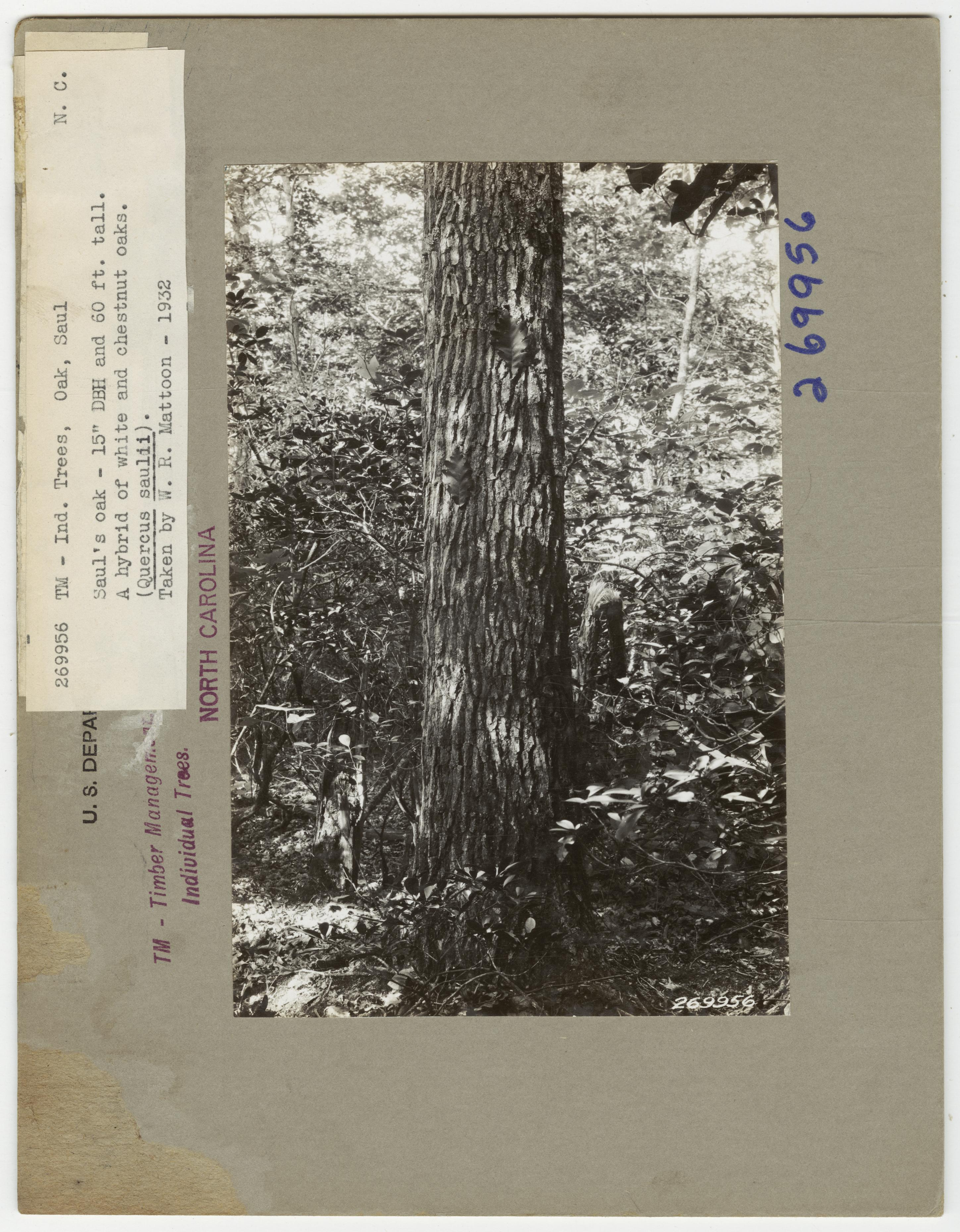

Scientific classification
- Kingdom: Plantae
- Clade: Tracheophytes
- Clade: Angiosperms
- Clade: Eudicots
- Clade: Rosids
- Order: Fagales
- Family: Fagaceae
- Genus: Quercus
- Subgenus: Quercus subg. Quercus
- Section: Quercus sect. Quercus
- Species: Q. × saulii

Binomial name
- Quercus × saulii C.K.Schneid.

= Quercus × saulii =

Quercus × saulii is a hybrid oak tree in the genus Quercus. The tree is a hybrid of Quercus montana (chestnut oak) and Quercus alba (white oak).
