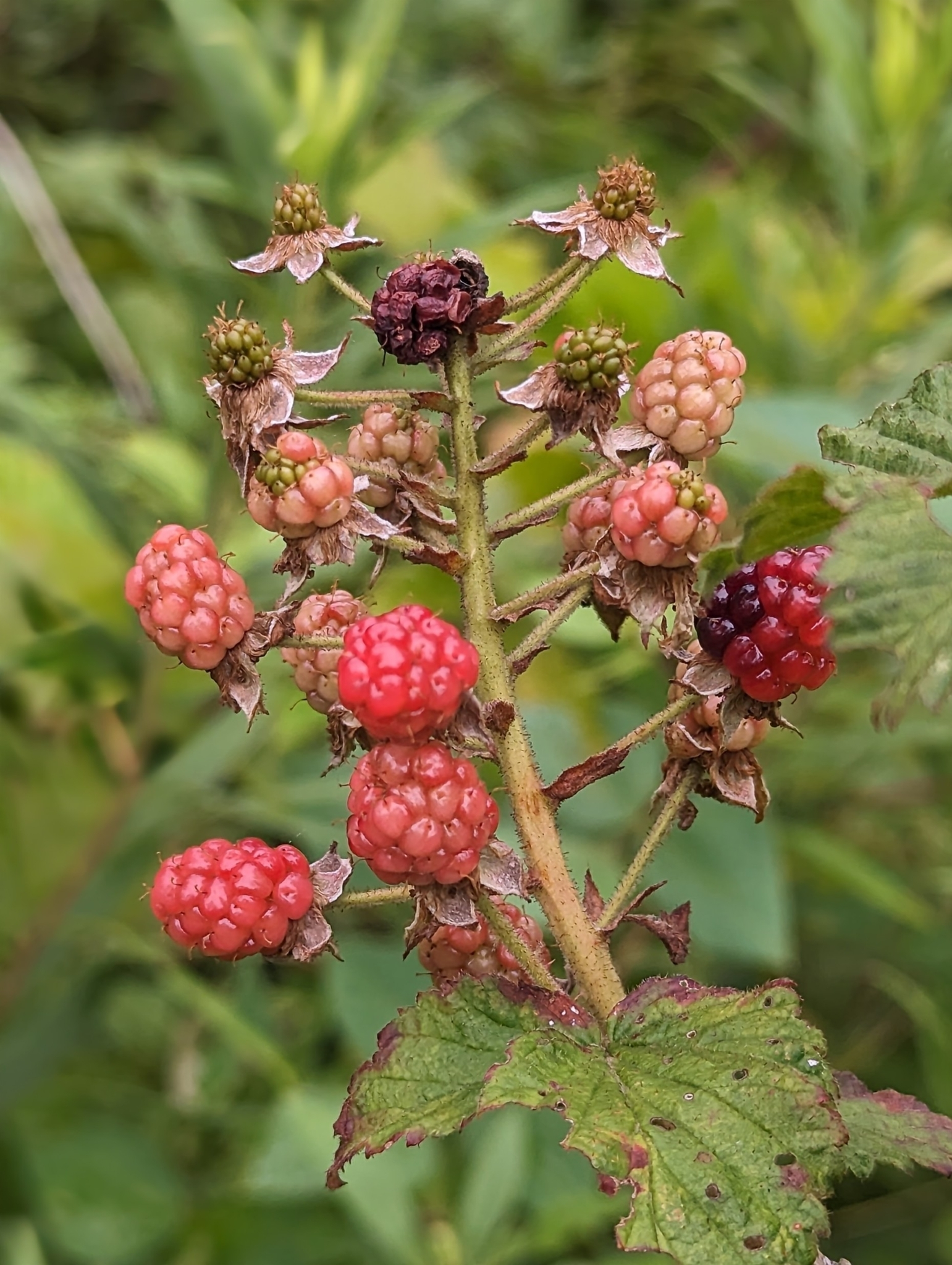

Scientific classification
- Kingdom: Plantae
- Clade: Tracheophytes
- Clade: Angiosperms
- Clade: Eudicots
- Clade: Rosids
- Order: Rosales
- Family: Rosaceae
- Genus: Rubus
- Species: R. rosa

Binomial name
- Rubus rosa L.H.Bailey

= Rubus rosa =

Species of fruit and plant

Rubus rosa, commonly known as rose blackberry, is a North American species of highbush blackberry in Section Alleghenienses of the genus Rubus, a member of the rose family. It grows in the eastern and central United States (from Maine south to North Carolina and west as far as Minnesota and Nebraska), as well as eastern Canada (Québec).
