= Rubus philadelphicus =

Scientific classification
- Kingdom: Plantae
- Clade: Tracheophytes
- Clade: Angiosperms
- Clade: Eudicots
- Clade: Rosids
- Order: Rosales
- Family: Rosaceae
- Genus: Rubus
- Species: R. philadelphicus

Binomial name
- Rubus philadelphicus Blanch. 1907

Species of fruit and plant

Rubus philadelphicus is an uncommon North American species of brambles in the rose family. It has been found in the eastern United States, primarily in the Appalachian Mountains of Pennsylvania and West Virginia.

Rubus philadelphicus is a prickly shrub with arching canes, slightly prickly. Fruit is fleshy and by all accounts good-tasting.

The genetics of Rubus is extremely complex, so that it is difficult to decide on which groups should be recognized as species. There are many rare species with limited ranges such as this. Further study is suggested to clarify the taxonomy.
