= Rubus suus =

Scientific classification
- Kingdom: Plantae
- Clade: Embryophytes
- Clade: Tracheophytes
- Clade: Angiosperms
- Clade: Eudicots
- Clade: Rosids
- Order: Rosales
- Family: Rosaceae
- Genus: Rubus
- Species: R. suus

Binomial name
- Rubus suus L.H.Bailey

Synonyms
- Rubus demareanus L.H.Bailey; Rubus jennisonii L.H.Bailey; Rubus monongaliensis L.H.Bailey; Rubus ramifer L.H.Bailey; Rubus texanus L.H.Bailey; Rubus vixargutus L.H.Bailey

Species of fruit and plant

Rubus suus is an uncommon North American species of brambles in the rose family. It grows in the eastern and south-central United States from Georgia north to Pennsylvania and Ohio, west to eastern Texas.

The genetics of Rubus is extremely complex, so that it is difficult to decide on which groups should be recognized as species. There are many rare species with limited ranges such as this. Further study is suggested to clarify the taxonomy.
