= D. spicata =

D. spicata may refer to:

- Danthonia spicata, a grass species in the genus Danthonia found in Ohio
- Distichlis spicata, the seashore saltgrass or inland saltgrass, a plant species

== See also ==
- The dictionary definition of Spicata at Wiktionary
