= L. spicata =

L. spicata may refer to:

- Liatris spicata, the dense blazing star or prairie gay feather, an herbaceous perennial plant species.
- Liriope spicata, a flowering plant species native East Asia.
- Lobelia spicata, a flowering plant species in the genus Lobelia.
  - Lobelia spicata var. spicata, a subspecies found in Ohio.
- Luzula spicata, the spiked woodrush, a flowering plant species.

== See also ==
- The dictionary definition of Spicata at Wiktionary
