= Slender glasswort =

Slender glasswort is a common name for several plants in the genus Salicornia, and may refer to:

- Salicornia depressa, native to coastal North America, for example List of flora of Ohio § S
- Salicornia europaea, native to Europe
- Salicornia maritima, native to eastern Canada
