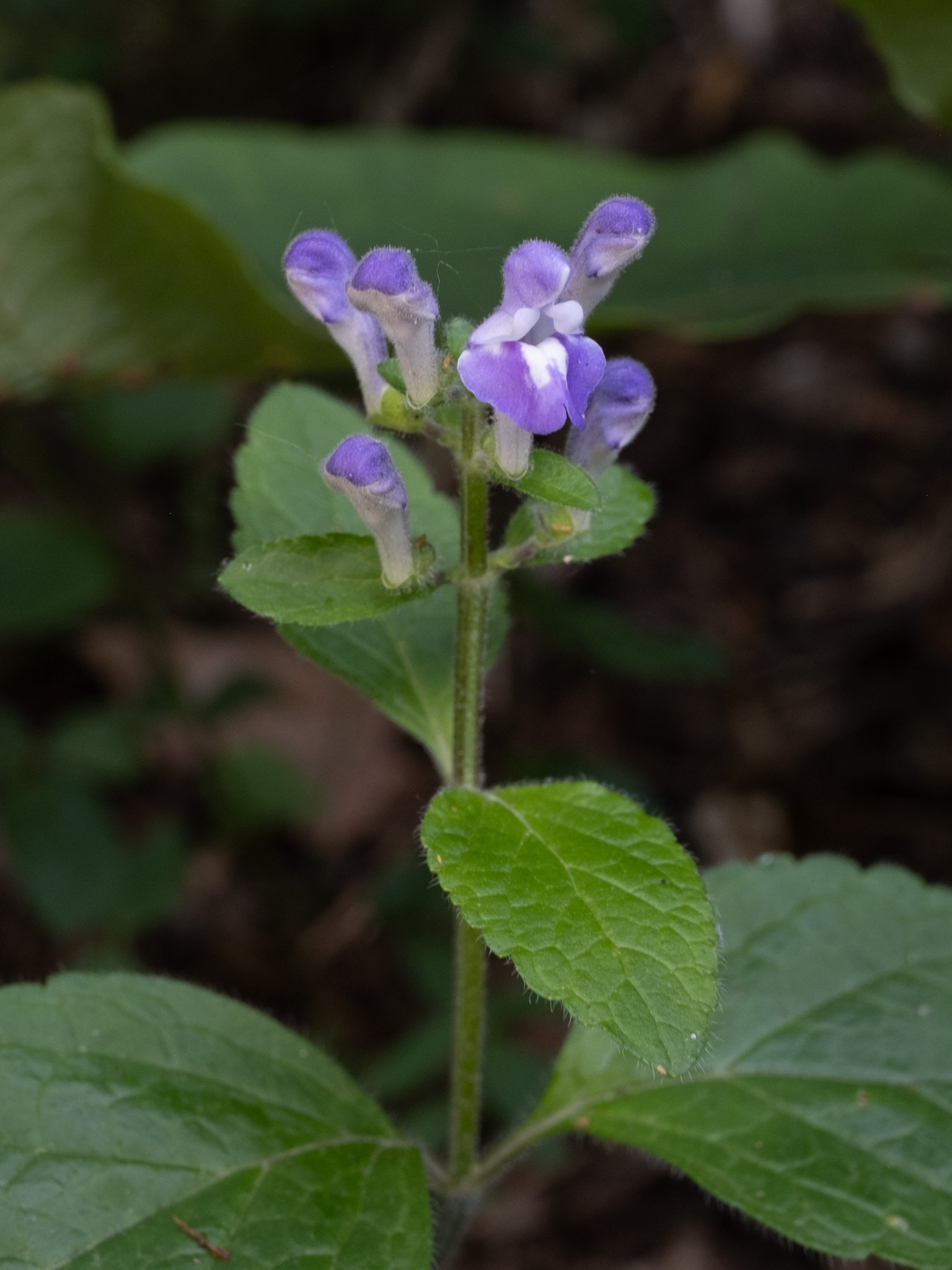

Conservation status
- Secure (NatureServe)

Scientific classification
- Kingdom: Plantae
- Clade: Tracheophytes
- Clade: Angiosperms
- Clade: Eudicots
- Clade: Asterids
- Order: Lamiales
- Family: Lamiaceae
- Genus: Scutellaria
- Species: S. elliptica

Binomial name
- Scutellaria elliptica Muhl.

= Scutellaria elliptica =

Species of flowering plant

Scutellaria elliptica, commonly called hairy skullcap, is a species of flowering plant in the mint family (Lamiaceae). It is a perennial forb found in the southeastern and mid-eastern states of the United States.

== Description ==
The stems of S. elliptica may reach a height between 1.5 and 8 decimeters (6 to 31.5 inches). The leaves are elliptic to rhombic-ovate in shape, and are 3 to 8 centimeters (approximately 1.18 to 3.15 inches) in length with a width of 1.5 to 4 centimeters (approximately 0.6 to 1.6 inches). It has blue flowers.

== Distribution and habitat ==
Scutellaria elliptica is found in several of the United States ranging from Texas on the west to New York on the east and Michigan on the north to Florida on the south. Its global conservation status is secure according to Natureserve.

Within the United States' Coastal Plain region, this species has been observed in habitat types such as upland pine communities.
