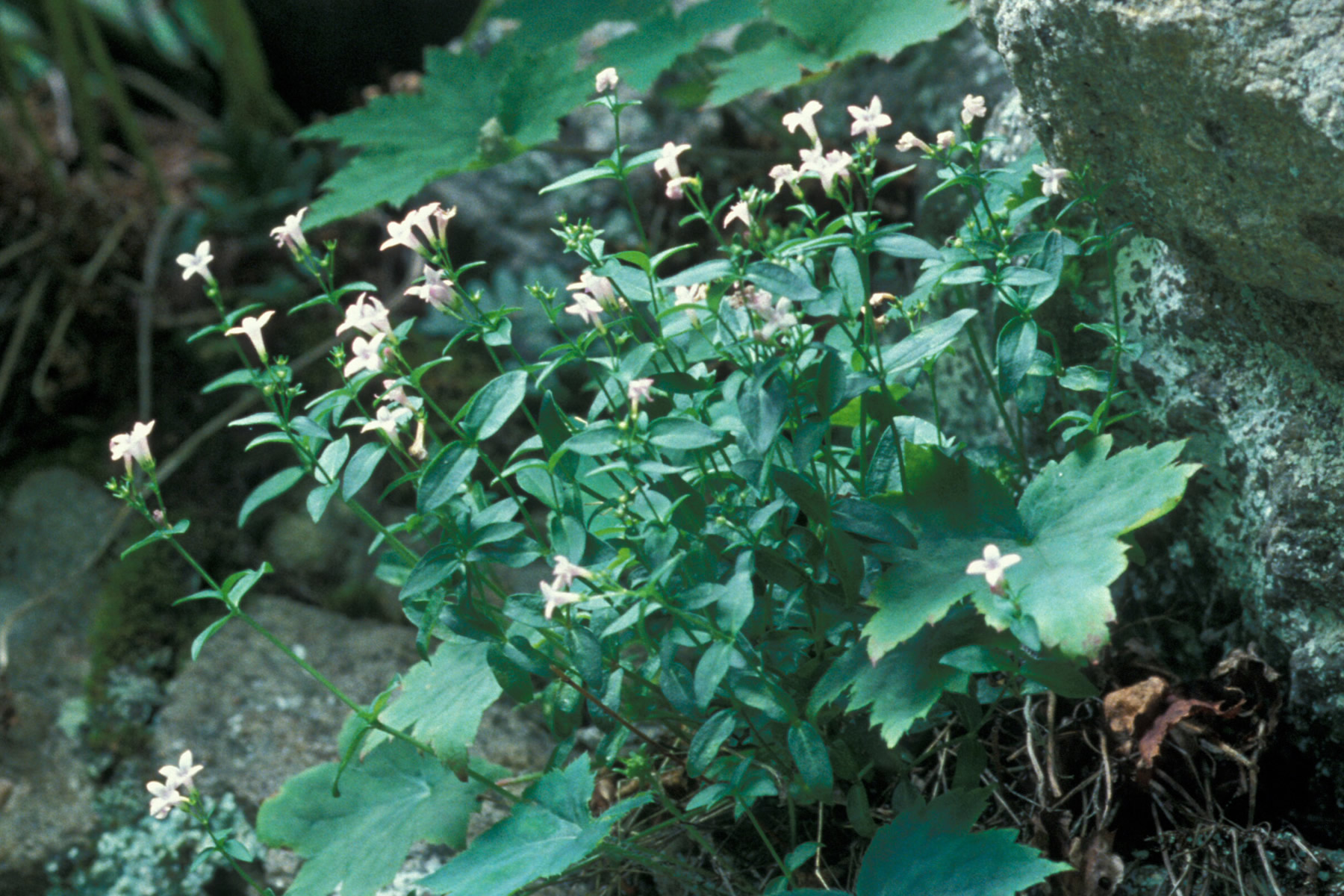
- Houstonia purpurea var. montana

Conservation status
- Secure (NatureServe)

Scientific classification
- Kingdom: Plantae
- Clade: Tracheophytes
- Clade: Angiosperms
- Clade: Eudicots
- Clade: Asterids
- Order: Gentianales
- Family: Rubiaceae
- Genus: Houstonia
- Species: H. purpurea

Binomial name
- Houstonia purpurea L.

Synonyms
- Hedyotis purpurea

= Houstonia purpurea =

Species of plant

Houstonia purpurea (formerly Hedyotis purpurea) is a species of flowering plant in the coffee family known by the common names Venus's pride, woodland bluet, and purple bluet. It is native to the eastern United States from eastern Texas and Oklahoma east to Florida and Pennsylvania, with scattered populations in Nebraska, Iowa, Michigan, New York State and New England.

There are three varieties of this species. The rarest, var. montana (Roan Mountain bluet) is a federally listed endangered species of the United States. It occurs only in the southern Appalachians along the border between Tennessee and North Carolina. It is named for Roan Mountain, one of a very few mountain peaks where it grows.

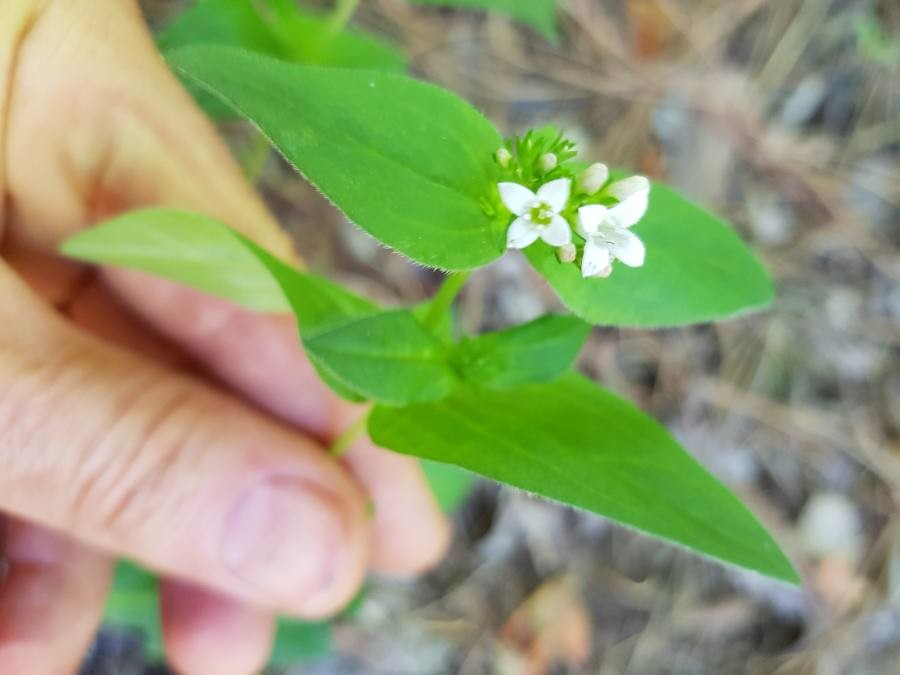
Flower

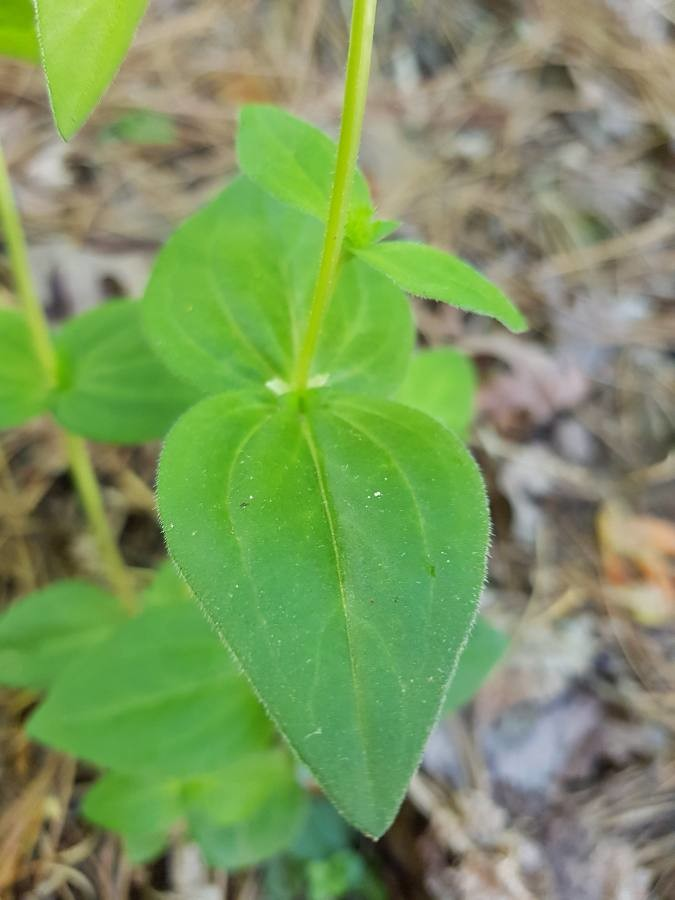
Leaf
