= Helianthus × cinereus =

Scientific classification
- Kingdom: Plantae
- Clade: Tracheophytes
- Clade: Angiosperms
- Clade: Eudicots
- Clade: Asterids
- Order: Asterales
- Family: Asteraceae
- Tribe: Heliantheae
- Genus: Helianthus
- Species: H. × cinereus

Binomial name
- Helianthus × cinereus Torr. & A.Gray

Species of sunflower

Helianthus × cinereus is a species of sunflower native to the United States, in Missouri, Kentucky, Indiana, and Ohio. H. cinereus was proposed as a new species by Torrey and Gray in 1842. It is a natural hybrid with similar features to artificial hybrids between Helianthus mollis and Helianthus occidentalis.
