= Rhamnus lanceolata =

Conservation status
- Least Concern (IUCN 3.1)

Scientific classification
- Kingdom: Plantae
- Clade: Tracheophytes
- Clade: Angiosperms
- Clade: Eudicots
- Clade: Rosids
- Order: Rosales
- Family: Rhamnaceae
- Genus: Rhamnus
- Species: R. lanceolata

Binomial name
- Rhamnus lanceolata Pursh

Synonyms
- Cardiolepis nigra Raf.; Cardiolepis rubra Raf.; Endotropis lanceolata (Pursh) Hauenschild; Endotropis lanceolata subsp. glabrata (Gleason) Hauenschild; Rhamnus lanceolata var. glabrata Gleason; Rhamnus lanceolata subsp. glabrata (Gleason) J.T.Kartesz & Gandhi; Rhamnus lanceolata var. lanceolata Gleason, not validly publ.; Rhamnus parvifolia Torr. & A.Gray, nom. illeg. homonym. post.; Rhamnus shortii Nutt.; Sageretia lanceolata (Pursh) G.Don; Sarcomphalus shortianus Raf.; Ventia lanceolata (Pursh) Hauenschild; Ventia lanceolata subsp. glabrata (Gleason) Hauenschild

Species of shrub

Rhamnus lanceolata, the lanceleaf buckthorn, is a shrub species in the Rhamnaceae (buckthorn family), native to about 20 states in the south-central and midwestern US.

== Taxonomy ==
The species was described by Frederick Traugott Pursh in 1813.
