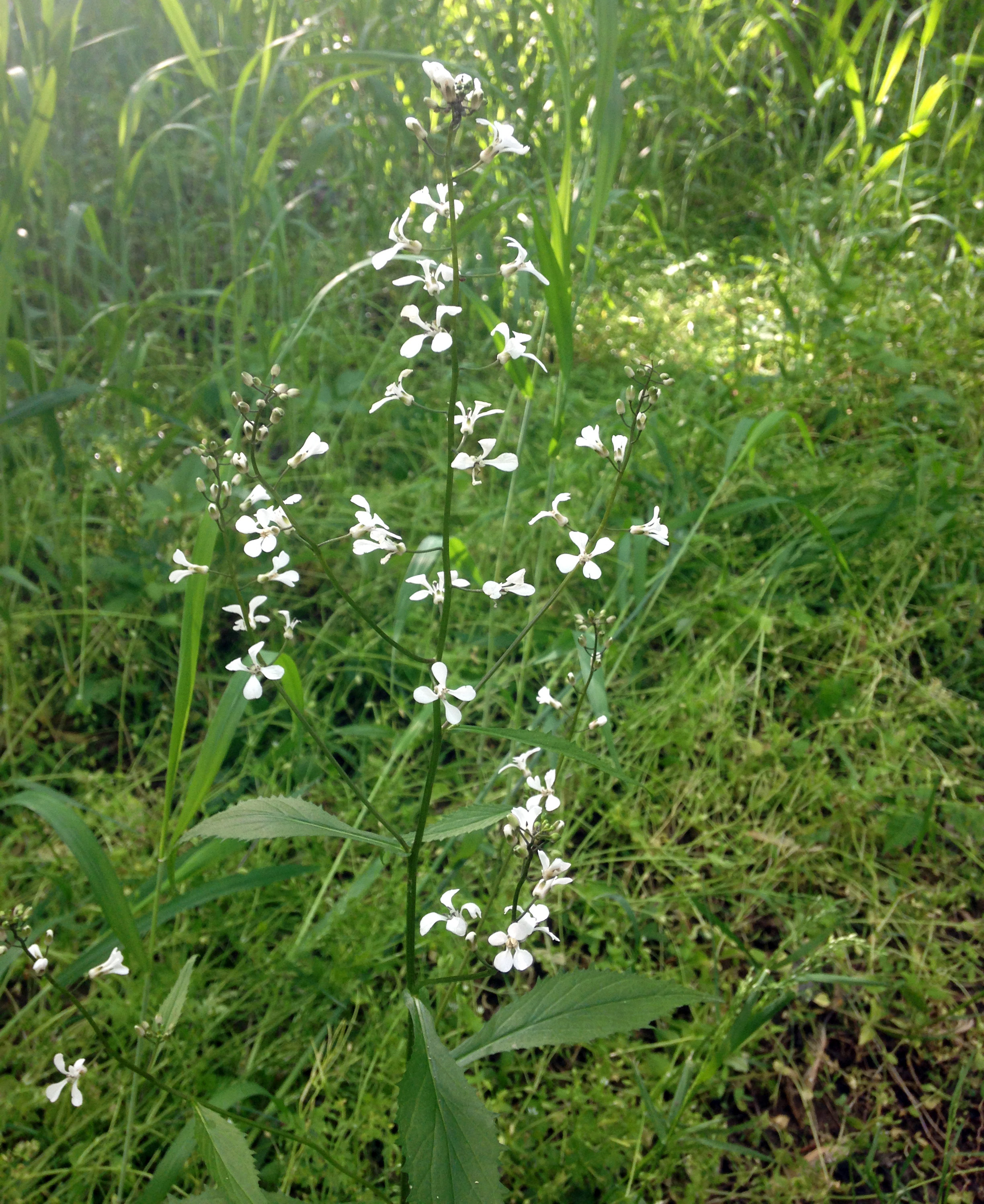

Scientific classification
- Kingdom: Plantae
- Clade: Tracheophytes
- Clade: Angiosperms
- Clade: Eudicots
- Clade: Rosids
- Order: Brassicales
- Family: Brassicaceae
- Genus: Iodanthus; Torr. & A.Gray
- Species: I. pinnatifidus

Binomial name
- Iodanthus pinnatifidus (Michx.) Steud.

Synonyms
- Oclorosis Raf.; Arabis hesperidoides A.Gray; Cheiranthus hesperidioides Torr. & A.Gray; Hesperis pinnatifida Michx. (1803) (basionym); Iodanthus hesperidoides Torr. & A.Gray; Sisymbrium nasturtium Muhl.; Thelypodium pinnatifidum S.Watson

= Iodanthus =

Genus of flowering plants

Iodanthus pinnatifidus, commonly known as purplerocket, is a species of flowering plant in the mustard family. It is monotypic, with no other species in the genus Iodanthus.

It is native to eastern North America, where its range is centered in the Midwest and Upper South regions of the United States. Its typical natural habitat is in wet to mesic forests, in bottomlands and lower slopes. It can also occur in more open wet thickets and meadows. It is a conservative species that typically occurs in intact natural areas, and is not found in ecologically degraded sites.

Iodanthus pinnatifidus is an erect perennial herb. It produces a raceme of light purple flowers which fade to white. It blooms from late April to early July.
