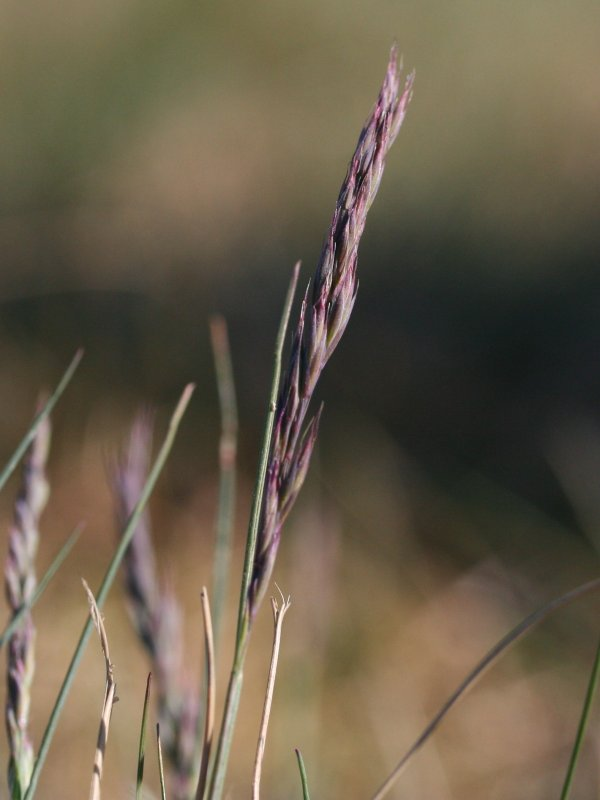
- Festuca brevipila

Scientific classification
- Kingdom: Plantae
- Clade: Tracheophytes
- Clade: Angiosperms
- Clade: Monocots
- Clade: Commelinids
- Order: Poales
- Family: Poaceae
- Subfamily: Pooideae
- Genus: Festuca
- Species: F. brevipila

Binomial name
- Festuca brevipila Tracey

= Festuca brevipila =

Species of grass

Festuca brevipila, also known as hard fescue, is a species of grass which can be found everywhere in Canada and in both the Eastern and Central United States (except for Arkansas, Kansas, Nebraska, Oklahoma, and South Dakota).

The species derives its common name from its reputation as the "hardiest" of the fescue family. It does well in poor soils and is "very drought tolerant", growing better with deep and infrequent watering.

This grass is commonly used for residential lawns, sports turf, and erosion control.
