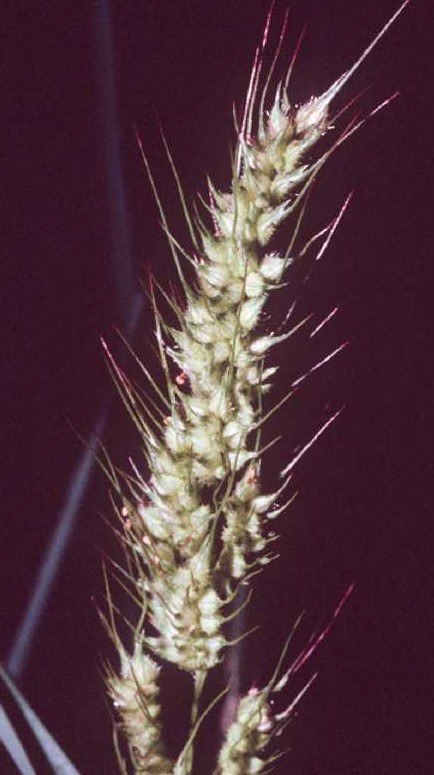

Scientific classification
- Kingdom: Plantae
- Clade: Tracheophytes
- Clade: Angiosperms
- Clade: Monocots
- Clade: Commelinids
- Order: Poales
- Family: Poaceae
- Subfamily: Panicoideae
- Genus: Echinochloa
- Species: E. muricata

Binomial name
- Echinochloa muricata (P.Beauv.) Fernald

= Echinochloa muricata =

Species of flowering plant

Echinochloa muricata is a species of grass known by the common names rough barnyard grass and American barnyard grass. It is native to Eurasia and much of North America.

It is an annual grass growing one half to one meter in height.

It is considered an agricultural weed, due to its propensity to use up nitrogen and phosphorus in soil needed for crops and long seed persistence.
