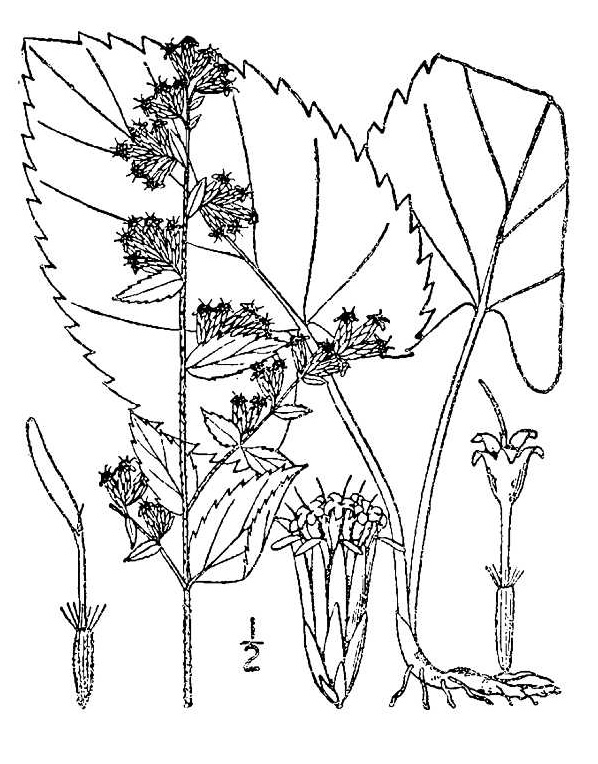
- 1913 illustration

Scientific classification
- Kingdom: Plantae
- Clade: Tracheophytes
- Clade: Angiosperms
- Clade: Eudicots
- Clade: Asterids
- Order: Asterales
- Family: Asteraceae
- Genus: Solidago
- Species: S. sphacelata

Binomial name
- Solidago sphacelata Raf. 1820

Synonyms
- Brachychaeta cordata (Short & R.Peter) Torr. & A.Gray; Brachychaeta sphacelata (Raf.) Britton ex Kearney; Brachyris ovatifolia DC.; Solidago cordata Short & R. Peter

= Solidago sphacelata =

Species of flowering plant

Solidago sphacelata, commonly known as false goldenrod or autumn goldenrod, is a North American species of goldenrod in the family Asteraceae. It is native to the eastern United States from Virginia and the Carolinas west as far as Illinois and Mississippi.

Solidago sphacelata is a drought-tolerant, perennial herb up to 120 cm (4 feet) tall, with an underground caudex and rhizomes. One plant can produce as many as 250 small yellow flower heads in a large branching array at the top of the plant. The bright yellow color of the flowers primarily attracts butterfly pollinators.
