= List of Canadian plants by family R =

Main page: List of Canadian plants by family

The following families of vascular plants are listed as occurring in Canada:

For mosses of Canada, see:

== Radulaceae ==
- Radula auriculata
- Radula complanata
- Radula obconica
- Radula obtusiloba
- Radula prolifera
- Radula tenax

== Ranunculaceae ==
- Aconitum columbianum — Columbia monkshood
- Aconitum delphiniifolium — larkspur-leaf monkshood
- Aconitum x bicolor
- Actaea elata — tall bugbane
- Actaea pachypoda — white baneberry
- Actaea racemosa — black bugbane
- Actaea rubra — red baneberry
- Actaea x ludovici
- Anemone canadensis — Canada anemone
- Anemone cylindrica — long-fruited anemone
- Anemone drummondii — Drummond's anemone
- Anemone lithophila — Little Belt Mountain thimbleweed
- Anemone lyallii — little mountain thimbleweed
- Anemone multiceps — Porcupine River thimbleweed
- Anemone multifida — Hudson Bay anemone
- Anemone narcissiflora — narcissus thimbleweed
- Anemone parviflora — smallflower anemone
- Anemone piperi — Piper's anemone
- Anemone quinquefolia — wood anemone
- Anemone richardsonii — yellow anemone
- Anemone virginiana — Virginia anemone
- Aquilegia brevistyla — smallflower columbine
- Aquilegia canadensis — wild columbine
- Aquilegia flavescens — yellow columbine
- Aquilegia formosa — crimson columbine
- Aquilegia jonesii — Jones' columbine
- Caltha leptosepala — slender-sepal marsh-marigold
- Caltha natans — floating marsh-marigold
- Caltha palustris — marsh-marigold
- Clematis columbiana — Columbian virgin's-bower
- Clematis hirsutissima — clustered leather-flower
- Clematis ligusticifolia — western virgin's-bower
- Clematis occidentalis — purple clematis
- Clematis virginiana — Virginia virgin's-bower
- Coptis aspleniifolia — spleenwort-leaf goldthread
- Coptis trifolia — goldthread
- Delphinium bicolor — flathead larkspur
- Delphinium brachycentrum — northern larkspur
- Delphinium burkei — meadow larkspur
- Delphinium carolinianum — Carolina larkspur
- Delphinium distichum — two-spike larkspur
- Delphinium glareosum — rockslide larkspur
- Delphinium glaucum — pale larkspur
- Delphinium menziesii — Puget Sound larkspur
- Delphinium nuttallianum — Nuttall's larkspur
- Delphinium sutherlandii — Sutherland's larkspur
- Delphinium x occidentale — duncecap larkspur
- Enemion biternatum — false rue-anemone
- Enemion savilei — Queen Charlotte Island false rue-anemone
- Anemone hepatica — roundlobe hepatica
- Hydrastis canadensis — goldenseal
- Kumlienia cooleyae — Cooley's buttercup
- Myosurus apetalus — bristly mousetail
- Myosurus minimus — eastern mousetail
- Pulsatilla occidentalis — western pasqueflower
- Pulsatilla nuttalliana — American pasqueflower
- Ranunculus abortivus — kidneyleaf buttercup
- Ranunculus acris — tall buttercup
- Ranunculus alismifolius — water-plantain buttercup
- Ranunculus allenii — Allen's buttercup
- Ranunculus ambigens — water-plantain spearwort
- Ranunculus aquatilis — white water buttercup
- Ranunculus californicus — California buttercup
- Ranunculus cardiophyllus — heartleaf buttercup
- Ranunculus cymbalaria — seaside crowfoot
- Ranunculus eschscholtzii — Eschscholtz' buttercup
- Ranunculus eximius — tundra buttercup
- Ranunculus fascicularis — early buttercup
- Ranunculus ficaria — figroot buttercup
- Ranunculus flabellaris — yellow water-crowfoot
- Ranunculus flammula — lesser spearwort
- Ranunculus glaberrimus — sagebrush buttercup
- Ranunculus gmelinii — small yellow water-crowfoot
- Ranunculus hexasepalus — Queen Charlotte Island buttercup
- Ranunculus hispidus — hispid buttercup
- Ranunculus hyperboreus — arctic buttercup
- Ranunculus inamoenus — graceful buttercup
- Ranunculus karelinii — Karelin's arctic buttercup
- Ranunculus lapponicus — Lapland buttercup
- Ranunculus longirostris — eastern white water-crowfoot
- Ranunculus macounii — Macoun's buttercup
- Ranunculus nivalis — snowy buttercup
- Ranunculus occidentalis — western buttercup
- Ranunculus orthorhynchus — bird's-food buttercup
- Ranunculus pallasii — Pallas' buttercup
- Ranunculus pedatifidus — northern buttercup
- Ranunculus pensylvanicus — bristly crowfoot
- Ranunculus pygmaeus — dwarf buttercup
- Ranunculus recurvatus — hooked crowfoot
- Ranunculus rhomboideus — prairie buttercup
- Ranunculus sabinei — Sardinian buttercup
- Ranunculus sceleratus — cursed crowfoot
- Ranunculus suksdorfii — Suksdorf's buttercup
- Ranunculus sulphureus — sulphur buttercup
- Ranunculus trichophyllus — northeastern white water-crowfoot
- Ranunculus turneri — Turner's buttercup
- Ranunculus uncinatus — woodland buttercup
- Ranunculus verecundus — timberline buttercup
- Ranunculus x spitzbergensis
- Thalictrum alpinum — alpine meadowrue
- Thalictrum dasycarpum — purple meadowrue
- Thalictrum dioicum — early meadowrue
- Thalictrum occidentale — western meadowrue
- Thalictrum pubescens — tall meadowrue
- Thalictrum revolutum — waxleaf meadowrue
- Thalictrum sparsiflorum — few-flower meadowrue
- Thalictrum thalictroides — windflower
- Thalictrum venulosum — veined meadowrue
- Trautvetteria caroliniensis — Carolina tassel-rue
- Trollius laxus — spreading globeflower

== Rhamnaceae ==
- Ceanothus americanus — New Jersey tea
- Ceanothus herbaceus — prairie redroot
- Ceanothus sanguineus — Oregon-tea
- Ceanothus velutinus — tobacco ceanothus
- Frangula purshiana — Cascara false buckthorn
- Rhamnus alnifolia — alderleaf buckthorn

== Rhytidiaceae ==
- Rhytidium rugosum — golden glade-moss

== Ricciaceae ==
- Riccia beyrichiana
- Riccia bifurca
- Riccia cavernosa
- Riccia fluitans
- Riccia frostii
- Riccia sorocarpa
- Riccia sullivantii
- Ricciocarpos natans

== Rosaceae ==
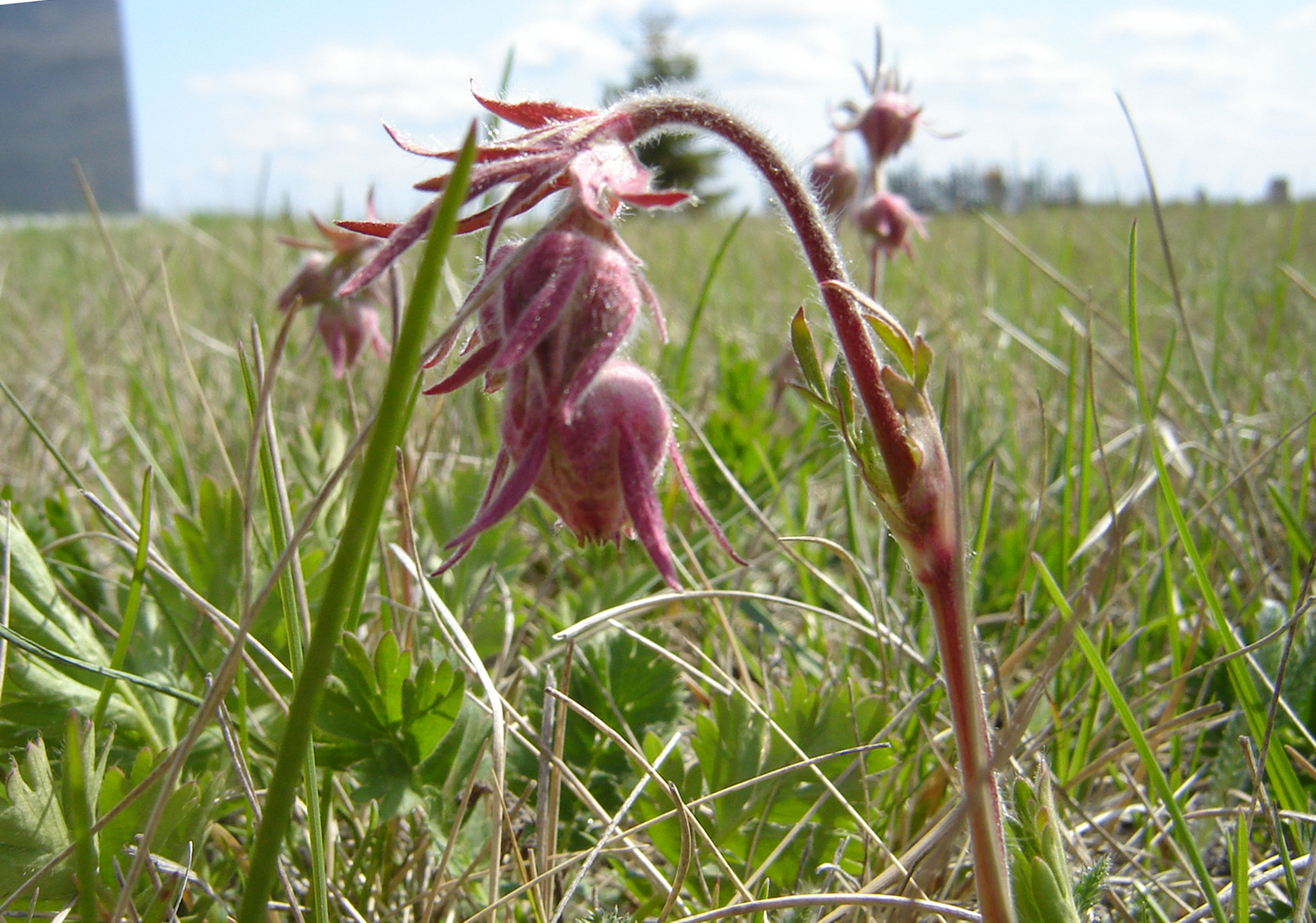
Geum triflorum, Three-Flowered Avens, Old Man's Whisker's, or Prairie Smoke

- Agrimonia gryposepala — tall hairy groovebur
- Agrimonia parviflora — swamp agrimony
- Agrimonia pubescens — soft groovebur
- Agrimonia striata — woodland agrimony
- Alchemilla alpina — mountain lady's-mantle
- Alchemilla filicaulis — thinstem lady's-mantle
- Alchemilla glomerulans — clustered lady's-mantle
- Amelanchier alnifolia — saskatoonberry
- Amelanchier arborea — downy serviceberry
- Amelanchier bartramiana — Bartram's shadbush
- Amelanchier canadensis — oblongleaf serviceberry
- Amelanchier fernaldii — Fernald's serviceberry
- Amelanchier humilis — running serviceberry
- Amelanchier interior — shadbush
- Amelanchier laevis — Allegheny serviceberry
- Amelanchier sanguinea — roundleaf shadbush
- Amelanchier stolonifera — running serviceberry
- Amelanchier × intermedia
- Amelanchier × neglecta
- Amelanchier × quinti-martii
- Argentina anserina — silverweed
- Argentina egedei — Eged's cinquefoil
- Aronia floribunda — purple chokeberry
- Aronia melanocarpa — black chokeberry
- Aronia pyrifolia — red chokeberry
- Aruncus dioicus — common goat's-beard
- Chamaerhodos erecta — rose chamærhodos
- Comarum palustre — marsh cinquefoil
- Crataegus beata — Dunbar's hawthorn
- Crataegus brainerdii — Brainerd's hawthorn
- Crataegus calpodendron — pear hawthorn
- Crataegus chrysocarpa — fineberry hawthorn
- Crataegus compacta — clustered hawthorn
- Crataegus compta — adorned hawthorn
- Crataegus crus-galli — cockspur hawthorn
- Crataegus dilatata — broadleaf hawthorn
- Crataegus dissona — northern hawthorn
- Crataegus dodgei — Dodge's hawthorn
- Crataegus douglasii — Douglas' hawthorn
- Crataegus flabellata — fanleaf hawthorn
- Crataegus fluviatilis
- Crataegus fulleriana — Fuller's hawthorn
- Crataegus holmesiana — Holmes' hawthorn
- Crataegus intricata — Copenhagen hawthorn
- Crataegus iracunda — stolon-bearing hawthorn
- Crataegus irrasa — Blanchard's hawthorn
- Crataegus jonesae — Miss Jones' hawthorn
- Crataegus knieskerniana — Knieskern's hawthorn
- Crataegus lemingtonensis — Lemington hawthorn
- Crataegus lumaria — roundleaf hawthorn
- Crataegus macrosperma — bigstem hawthorn
- Crataegus margarettiae — Margarett's hawthorn
- Crataegus mollis — downy hawthorn
- Crataegus nitida — glossy hawthorn
- Crataegus nitidula — Ontario hawthorn
- Crataegus okennonii — O'Kennon's hawthorn
- Crataegus pedicellata — scarlet hawthorn
- Crataegus pennsylvanica — Pennsylvania hawthorn
- Crataegus perjucunda — pearthorn
- Crataegus persimilis — plumleaf hawthorn
- Crataegus phippsii — Phipps' hawthorn
- Crataegus pringlei — Pringle's hawthorn
- Crataegus prona — Illinois hawthorn
- Crataegus pruinosa — waxy-fruit hawthorn
- Crataegus punctata — dotted hawthorn
- Crataegus robinsonii — Robinson's hawthorn
- Crataegus scabrida — rough hawthorn
- Crataegus schuettei — Schuette's hawthorn
- Crataegus submollis — Québec hawthorn
- Crataegus suborbiculata — Caughuawaga hawthorn
- Crataegus succulenta — fleshy hawthorn
- Crataegus suksdorfii — Suksdorf's hawthorn
- Crataegus x anomala
- Crataegus x kingstonensis
- Dalibarda repens — robin-run-away
- Dasiphora fruticosa — shrubby cinquefoil
- Dryas drummondii — yellow mountain-avens
- Dryas integrifolia — entire-leaved mountain-avens
- Dryas octopetala — eight-petal mountain-avens
- Dryas x sundermannii
- Dryas x wyssiana
- Drymocallis fissa — bigflower cinquefoil
- Filipendula rubra — queen-of-the-prairie
- Fragaria chiloensis — Chilean strawberry
- Fragaria crinita — Pacific strawberry
- Fragaria vesca — woodland strawberry
- Fragaria virginiana — Virginia strawberry
- Fragaria x ananassa
- Geum aleppicum — yellow avens
- Geum calthifolium — caltha-leaf avens
- Geum canadense — white avens
- Geum glaciale — glacier avens
- Geum laciniatum — rough avens
- Geum macrophyllum — largeleaf avens
- Geum peckii — mountain avens
- Geum rivale — purple avens
- Geum rossii — Ross' avens
- Geum triflorum — prairie-smoke
- Geum vernum — spring avens
- Geum virginianum — pale avens
- Geum x aurantiacum
- Geum x macranthum
- Geum x pulchrum
- Holodiscus discolor — creambush oceanspray
- Luetkea pectinata — segmented lütkea
- Malus coronaria — sweet crabapple
- Malus fusca — Pacific crabapple
- Malus glaucescens — sweet crabapple
- Oemleria cerasiformis — osoberry
- Physocarpus capitatus — Pacific ninebark
- Physocarpus malvaceus — mallowleaf ninebark
- Physocarpus opulifolius — eastern ninebark
- Potentilla arguta — tall cinquefoil
- Potentilla biennis — biennial cinquefoil
- Potentilla biflora — two-flower cinquefoil
- Potentilla bipinnatifida — tansy cinquefoil
- Potentilla canadensis — Canada cinquefoil
- Potentilla concinna — red cinquefoil
- Potentilla diversifolia — mountain meadow cinquefoil
- Potentilla drummondii — Drummond's cinquefoil
- Potentilla effusa — branched cinquefoil
- Potentilla elegans — elegant cinquefoil
- Potentilla flabellifolia — fanleaf cinquefoil
- Potentilla flabelliformis
- Potentilla glandulosa — sticky cinquefoil
- Potentilla gracilis — fanleaf cinquefoil
- Potentilla hippiana — horse cinquefoil
- Potentilla hookeriana — Hooker's cinquefoil
- Potentilla macounii — Macoun's cinquefoil
- Potentilla multifida — divided cinquefoil
- Potentilla nana — arctic cinquefoil
- Potentilla neumanniana — spring cinquefoil
- Potentilla nivea — snow cinquefoil
- Potentilla norvegica — Norwegian cinquefoil
- Potentilla ovina — sheep cinquefoil
- Potentilla paradoxa — bushy cinquefoil
- Potentilla pectinisecta — combleaf cinquefoil
- Potentilla pensylvanica — Pennsylvania cinquefoil
- Potentilla plattensis — Platte River cinquefoil
- Potentilla pulchella — pretty cinquefoil
- Potentilla pulcherrima — soft cinquefoil
- Potentilla rivalis — brook cinquefoil
- Potentilla rubricaulis — Rocky Mountain cinquefoil
- Potentilla simplex — common cinquefoil
- Potentilla subjuga — Colorado cinquefoil
- Potentilla tabernaemontani — spotted cinquefoil
- Potentilla uniflora — one-flower cinquefoil
- Potentilla vahliana — Vahl's cinquefoil
- Potentilla villosa — northern cinquefoil
- Prunus americana — American plum
- Prunus emarginata — bitter cherry
- Prunus nigra — Canada plum
- Prunus pensylvanica — fire cherry
- Prunus pumila — sand cherry
- Prunus serotina — wild black cherry
- Prunus virginiana — choke cherry
- Purshia tridentata — antelope bitterbrush
- Rosa acicularis — prickly rose
- Rosa arkansana — prairie rose
- Rosa blanda — smooth rose
- Rosa carolina — Carolina rose
- Rosa gymnocarpa — wood rose
- Rosa nitida — shining rose
- Rosa nutkana — Nootka rose
- Rosa palustris — swamp rose
- Rosa pisocarpa — clustered rose
- Rosa setigera — prairie rose
- Rosa virginiana — Virginia rose
- Rosa woodsii — Woods' rose
- Rosa x dulcissima
- Rubus adenocaulis — glandstem dewberry
- Rubus adjacens — peaty dewberry
- Rubus alaskensis — Alaska blackberry
- Rubus allegheniensis — Allegheny blackberry
- Rubus alumnus — blackberry
- Rubus arcticus — nagoonberry
- Rubus arcuans — wand dewberry
- Rubus arenicola — sand-dwelling dewberry
- Rubus baileyanus — Bailey's dewberry
- Rubus bellobatus — Kittatinny blackberry
- Rubus biformispinus — pasture dewberry
- Rubus canadensis — smooth blackberry
- Rubus chamaemorus — cloudberry
- Rubus elegantulus — showy blackberry
- Rubus flagellaris — northern dewberry
- Rubus fraternalis — northeastern dewberry
- Rubus frondisentis — leafy blackberry
- Rubus frondosus — Yankee blackberry
- Rubus glandicaulis — glandstem blackberry
- Rubus heterophyllus — ecotone blackberry
- Rubus hispidus — bristly dewberry
- Rubus idaeus — American red raspberry
- Rubus jacens — spreading dewberry
- Rubus junceus — herbaceous blackberry
- Rubus kennedyanus — Kennedy's blackberry
- Rubus lasiococcus — hairy-fruit smooth dewberry
- Rubus leucodermis — white-stemmed raspberry
- Rubus mananensis — Grand Manan dewberry
- Rubus michiganensis — Michigan dewberry
- Rubus multiformis — variable blackberry
- Rubus navus — grand lake blackberry
- Rubus nivalis — snow dwarf bramble
- Rubus novocaesarius — Tuckahoe dewberry
- Rubus occidentalis — black raspberry
- Rubus odoratus — purple-flowering raspberry
- Rubus ortivus — Mt. Desert Island blackberry
- Rubus paganus — St. Lawrence dewberry
- Rubus particeps — Kingston dewberry
- Rubus parviflorus — thimbleberry
- Rubus pedatus — five-leaf dwarf bramble
- Rubus pensilvanicus — Pennsylvania blackberry
- Rubus pergratus — upland blackberry
- Rubus pervarius — Westminster dewberry
- Rubus plicatifolius — plaitleaf dewberry
- Rubus provincialis — groundberry
- Rubus pubescens — dwarf red raspberry
- Rubus pugnax — pugnacious blackberry
- Rubus recurvans — recurved blackberry
- Rubus recurvicaulis — arching dewberry
- Rubus regionalis — Wisconsin dewberry
- Rubus roribaccus — velvet-leaved dewberry
- Rubus russeus — Halifax blackberry
- Rubus segnis — Nova Scotia dewberry
- Rubus semisetosus — New England blackberry
- Rubus setosus — small bristleberry
- Rubus severus — harsh dewberry
- Rubus signatus — sphagnum dewberry
- Rubus spectabilis — salmonberry
- Rubus suppar — New Glasgow dewberry
- Rubus tardatus — wet-thicket dewberry
- Rubus trifrons — dewberry
- Rubus ursinus — California blackberry
- Rubus uvidus — Kalamazoo dewberry
- Rubus vermontanus — Green Mountain blackberry
- Rubus weatherbyi — Weatherby's dewberry
- Rubus wheeleri — Wheeler's blackberry
- Rubus x fraseri
- Rubus x paracaulis
- Sanguisorba annua — prairie burnet
- Sanguisorba canadensis — Canada burnet
- Sanguisorba menziesii — Menzies' burnet
- Sanguisorba occidentalis — annual burnet
- Sanguisorba officinalis — great burnet
- Sibbaldia procumbens — Arizona cinquefoil
- Sibbaldiopsis tridentata — three-toothed cinquefoil
- Sorbus americana — American mountain-ash
- Sorbus decora — northern mountain-ash
- Sorbus groenlandica — Greenland mountain-ash
- Sorbus scopulina — Greene's mountain-ash
- Sorbus sitchensis — Sitka mountain-ash
- Spiraea alba — narrowleaf white meadowsweet
- Spiraea betulifolia — white meadowsweet
- Spiraea douglasii — Douglas' spiræa
- Spiraea septentrionalis — northern meadowsweet
- Spiraea splendens — rose meadowsweet
- Spiraea stevenii — Steven's spiræa
- Spiraea tomentosa — hardhack spiræa
- Spiraea x pyramidata — pyramidal spiræa
- x Sorbaronia arsenii
- x Sorbaronia jackii
- Waldsteinia fragarioides — barren strawberry

== Rubiaceae ==
- Cephalanthus occidentalis — common buttonbush
- Galium aparine — catchweed bedstraw
- Galium asprellum — rough bedstraw
- Galium bifolium — low mountain bedstraw
- Galium boreale — northern bedstraw
- Galium brevipes — limestone swamp bedstraw
- Galium circaezans — licorice bedstraw
- Galium concinnum — shining bedstraw
- Galium kamtschaticum — boreal bedstraw
- Galium labradoricum — bog bedstraw
- Galium lanceolatum — Torrey's wild licorice
- Galium mexicanum — Mexican bedstraw
- Galium multiflorum — many-flower bedstraw
- Galium obtusum — bluntleaf bedstraw
- Galium palustre — marsh bedstraw
- Galium pilosum — hairy bedstraw
- Galium tinctorium — stiff marsh bedstraw
- Galium trifidum — small bedstraw
- Galium triflorum — sweetscent bedstraw
- Houstonia caerulea — Quaker-ladies
- Houstonia canadensis — Canada bluets
- Houstonia longifolia — longleaf bluets
- Mitchella repens — partridge-berry

== Ruppiaceae ==
- Ruppia cirrhosa — widgeon-grass
- Ruppia maritima — ditch-grass

== Rutaceae ==
- Ptelea trifoliata — common hoptree
- Zanthoxylum americanum — northern prickly-ash
