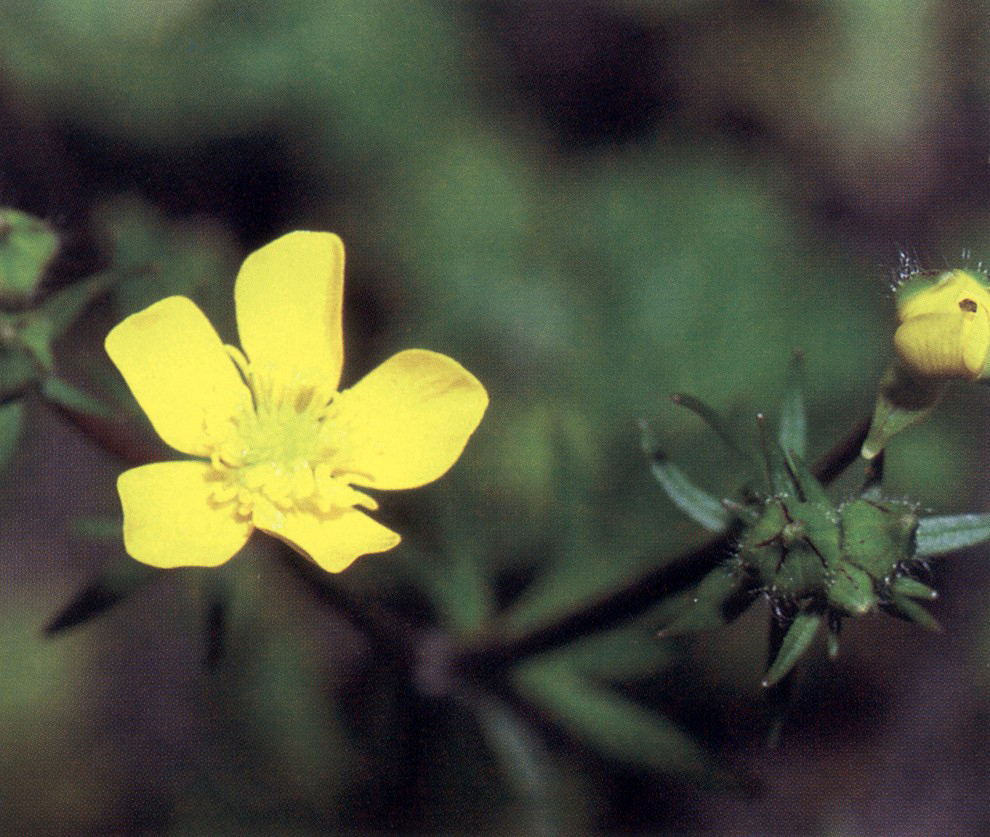

Scientific classification
- Kingdom: Plantae
- Clade: Tracheophytes
- Clade: Angiosperms
- Clade: Eudicots
- Order: Ranunculales
- Family: Ranunculaceae
- Genus: Ranunculus
- Species: R. recurvatus

Binomial name
- Ranunculus recurvatus Poir.

= Ranunculus recurvatus =

Species of flowering plant

Ranunculus recurvatus, the blisterwort or hooked crowfoot, is a plant species of the genus Ranunculus in the family Ranunculaceae native to eastern North America. It is an early-flowering plant of moist deciduous woods from central Quebec south to Florida.

This herbaceous perennial plant is about 1-2' tall, consisting of some basal leaves, branched stems with alternate leaves, and flowers. The basal leaves are up to 5" long and 5" across; they have long hairy petioles. Each basal leaf is palmately cleft into 3-5 lobes; these lobes are often divided again into smaller lobes. The alternate leaves are similar to the basal leaves, except they become smaller as they ascend the stems and their petioles are shorter. The upper leaves are more slender and divided into fewer lobes. The margins of the leaves are crenate or dentate. The upper surface of each leaf is medium to dark green and glabrous. The stems are light green, terete, and covered with long hairs; they are erect to ascending, rather than sprawling across the ground.
