= Rubus signatus =

Scientific classification
- Kingdom: Plantae
- Clade: Tracheophytes
- Clade: Angiosperms
- Clade: Eudicots
- Clade: Rosids
- Order: Rosales
- Family: Rosaceae
- Genus: Rubus
- Species: R. signatus

Binomial name
- Rubus signatus L.H.Bailey

Species of fruit and plant

Rubus signatus a North American species of brambles in the rose family. It grows in eastern and central Canada (Québec and Ontario) and the northern United States (New York, Michigan, and Indiana).

The genetics of Rubus is extremely complex, so that it is difficult to decide on which groups should be recognized as species. There are many rare species with limited ranges such as this. Further study is suggested to clarify the taxonomy.
