= Rubus segnis =

Scientific classification
- Kingdom: Plantae
- Clade: Tracheophytes
- Clade: Angiosperms
- Clade: Eudicots
- Clade: Rosids
- Order: Rosales
- Family: Rosaceae
- Genus: Rubus
- Species: R. segnis

Binomial name
- Rubus segnis L.H.Bailey

Synonyms
- Rubus pudens L.H.Bailey; Rubus trifrons var. pudens (L.H.Bailey) Fernald

Species of fruit and plant

Rubus segnis is an uncommon North American species of flowering plant in the rose family. It grows in eastern Canada (all 3 Maritime Provinces) and the northeastern United States (Maine, New Hampshire, Vermont, Massachusetts). Nowhere is it very common.

The genetics of Rubus is extremely complex, so that it is difficult to decide on which groups should be recognized as species. There are many rare species with limited ranges such as this. Further study is suggested to clarify the taxonomy. Some studies have suggested that R. segnis may have originated as a hybrid between R. flagellaris and R. hispidus.
