= Rubus recurvans =

Scientific classification
- Kingdom: Plantae
- Clade: Tracheophytes
- Clade: Angiosperms
- Clade: Eudicots
- Clade: Rosids
- Order: Rosales
- Family: Rosaceae
- Genus: Rubus
- Species: R. recurvans

Binomial name
- Rubus recurvans Blanch. 1904

Synonyms
- Rubus cauliflorus L.H.Bailey; Rubus limulus L.H.Bailey; Rubus perfoliosus L.H.Bailey; Rubus pityophilus S.J.Sm. ex L.H.Bailey; Rubus recurvans var. subrecurvans Blanch.; Rubus wiegandii L.H.Bailey

Species of fruit and plant

Rubus recurvans is a North American species of blackberry in the genus Rubus, a member of the rose family. It is found in eastern and central Canada (Québec, Ontario, Nova Scotia) and in the eastern and north-central United States (from Maine west to Minnesota, as far south as Missouri, the Ohio River, and Virginia).
