= Rubus severus =

Scientific classification
- Kingdom: Plantae
- Clade: Tracheophytes
- Clade: Angiosperms
- Clade: Eudicots
- Clade: Rosids
- Order: Rosales
- Family: Rosaceae
- Genus: Rubus
- Species: R. severus

Binomial name
- Rubus severus Brainerd ex Fernald

Synonyms
- Rubus jacens var. specialis L.H.Bailey; Rubus mainensis L.H.Bailey; Rubus rixosus L.H.Bailey

Species of fruit and plant

Rubus severus is an uncommon North American species of flowering plant in the rose family. It is found in eastern Canada (Nova Scotia) and the northeastern and north-central United States (Maine, Vermont, New Hampshire, Rhode Island).

The genetics of Rubus is extremely complex, so that it is difficult to decide on which groups should be recognized as species. There are many rare species with limited ranges such as this. Further study is suggested to clarify the taxonomy. Some studies have suggested that R. severus may have originated as a hybrid between R. setosus and R. flagellaris.
