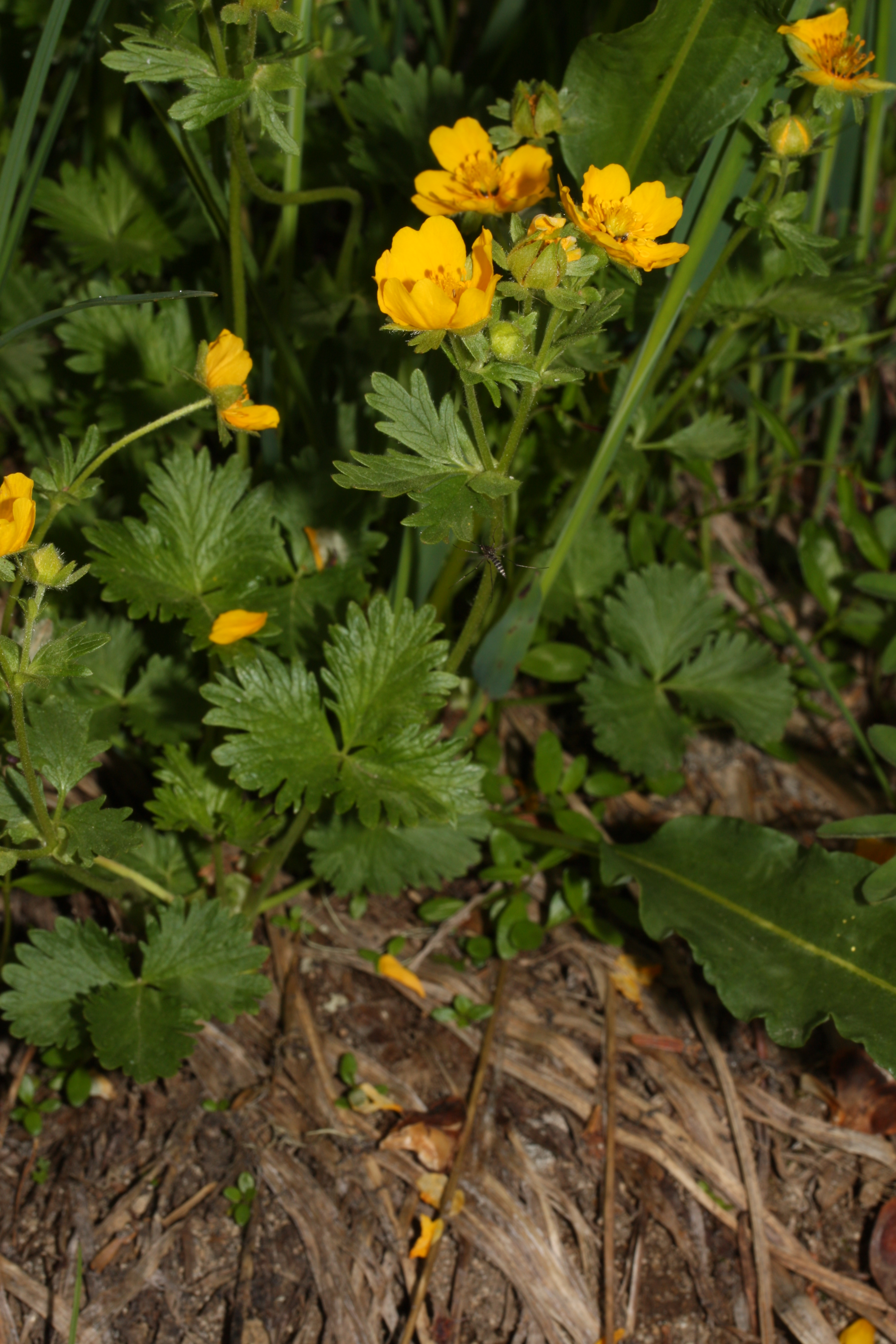

Scientific classification
- Kingdom: Plantae
- Clade: Tracheophytes
- Clade: Angiosperms
- Clade: Eudicots
- Clade: Rosids
- Order: Rosales
- Family: Rosaceae
- Genus: Potentilla
- Species: P. flabellifolia

Binomial name
- Potentilla flabellifolia Hook.

= Potentilla flabellifolia =

Species of flowering plant

Potentilla flabellifolia is a species of cinquefoil known by the common names high mountain cinquefoil, fanleaf cinquefoil and fan-foil.

== Description ==
Potentilla flabellifolia grows 10 to 30 centimeters tall, and is slightly hairy to nearly hairless. The leaves are ternate, divided into three leaflets. The basal leaves are largest, borne on long petioles. Each has oval leaflets up to 3 centimeters long which are deeply cut into blunt teeth. Smaller leaves occur higher on the stem. The inflorescence is a cyme of one or more flowers. The flower has usually five yellow petals up to a centimeter long on a calyx of pointed sepals and narrower pointed bractlets.

== Distribution and habitat ==
The plant is native to western North America from British Columbia to California and to Wyoming. It grows in higher elevation mountainous habitat, such as summertime meadows. It produces one or more erect stems from a branching caudex and system of rhizomes.
