= Rubus multiformis =

Scientific classification
- Kingdom: Plantae
- Clade: Embryophytes
- Clade: Tracheophytes
- Clade: Spermatophytes
- Clade: Angiosperms
- Clade: Eudicots
- Clade: Rosids
- Order: Rosales
- Family: Rosaceae
- Genus: Rubus
- Species: R. multiformis

Binomial name
- Rubus multiformis Blanch. 1906

Synonyms
- Rubus peracer L.H.Bailey

Species of plant

Rubus multiformis is an uncommon North American species of flowering plant in the rose family. It is found in eastern Canada (New Brunswick, Nova Scotia) and the northeastern and north-central United States (Maine, Vermont, New York, Michigan, Wisconsin).

The genetics of Rubus is extremely complex, so that it is difficult to decide on which groups should be recognized as species. There are many rare species with limited ranges such as this. Further study is suggested to clarify the taxonomy. Some studies have suggested that R. multiformis may have originated as a hybrid between R. setosus and R. flagellaris.
