= Rubus elegantulus =

Scientific classification
- Kingdom: Plantae
- Clade: Embryophytes
- Clade: Tracheophytes
- Clade: Spermatophytes
- Clade: Angiosperms
- Clade: Eudicots
- Clade: Rosids
- Order: Rosales
- Family: Rosaceae
- Genus: Rubus
- Species: R. elegantulus

Binomial name
- Rubus elegantulus Blanch. 1906

Synonyms
- Rubus adirondackensis L.H.Bailey; Rubus amabilis Blanch.; Rubus amicalis Blanch.; Rubus canadensis var. elegantulus (Blanch.) Farw.; Rubus proprius L.H.Bailey

Berry and plant

Rubus elegantulus, the showy blackberry, is an uncommon North American species of flowering plant in the rose family.

== Description ==
Rubus elegantulus is an erect perennial with stems growing to 60–120 centimetres (2–4 ft) tall, with prickles on the angles. The leaves are palmately compound with five leaflets, slightly darker on the upper surface than on the lower. The fruits are black, nearly spherical.

== Taxonomy ==
The genetics of Rubus is extremely complex, so that it is difficult to decide on which groups should be recognized as species. There are many rare species with limited ranges such as this. Further study is suggested to clarify the taxonomy. Some studies have suggested that R. elegantulus may have originated as a hybrid between R. allegheniensis and R. pensilvanicus.

== Distribution and habitat ==
The species grows in the northeastern and north-central United States (from Maine to West Virginia, plus Wisconsin and Minnesota) and eastern Canada (Québec, Newfoundland, and all three Maritime Provinces).
