= Rubus navus =

Scientific classification
- Kingdom: Plantae
- Clade: Tracheophytes
- Clade: Angiosperms
- Clade: Eudicots
- Clade: Rosids
- Order: Rosales
- Family: Rosaceae
- Genus: Rubus
- Species: R. navus

Binomial name
- Rubus navus L.H.Bailey 1941

Species of fruit and plant

Rubus navus is a rare North American species of flowering plants in the rose family. It is found in eastern Canada (Québec and New Brunswick) and in the northeastern United States (Maine).

The genetics of Rubus is extremely complex, so that it is difficult to decide on which groups should be recognized as species. There are many rare species with limited ranges such as this. Further study is suggested to clarify the taxonomy.
