= Rubus michiganensis =

Scientific classification
- Kingdom: Plantae
- Clade: Tracheophytes
- Clade: Angiosperms
- Clade: Eudicots
- Clade: Rosids
- Order: Rosales
- Family: Rosaceae
- Genus: Rubus
- Species: R. michiganensis

Binomial name
- Rubus michiganensis (F.W. Card ex L.H. Bailey) L.H.Bailey 1925

Synonyms
- Synonymy: Rubus villosus var. michiganensis F.W. Card ex L.H. Bailey 1898; Rubus flagellaris var. michiganensis (F.W. Card ex L.H. Bailey) L.H. Bailey; Rubus complex L.H.Bailey; Rubus cordifrons (L.H.Bailey) L.H.Bailey; Rubus florenceae L.H.Bailey; Rubus inobvius L.H.Bailey; Rubus prosper var. cordifrons L.H.Bailey

Species of plant

Rubus michiganensis, known as Michigan dewberry a North American species of dewberry in section Flagellares of the genus Rubus, a member of the rose family. It has been found in the Province of Ontario in central Canada, as well as in the Great Lakes region and in the Appalachian Mountains of the United States (Michigan, Wisconsin, Indiana, Ohio, Pennsylvania, West Virginia, Virginia, Maryland, and New Jersey).

Rubus michiganensis has trailing stems that grow horizontally across the surface of sandy soil or slightly below the surface. These produce herbaceous vertical stems that rise upwards, bearing compound leaves with 3, 5, or 7 leaflets.
