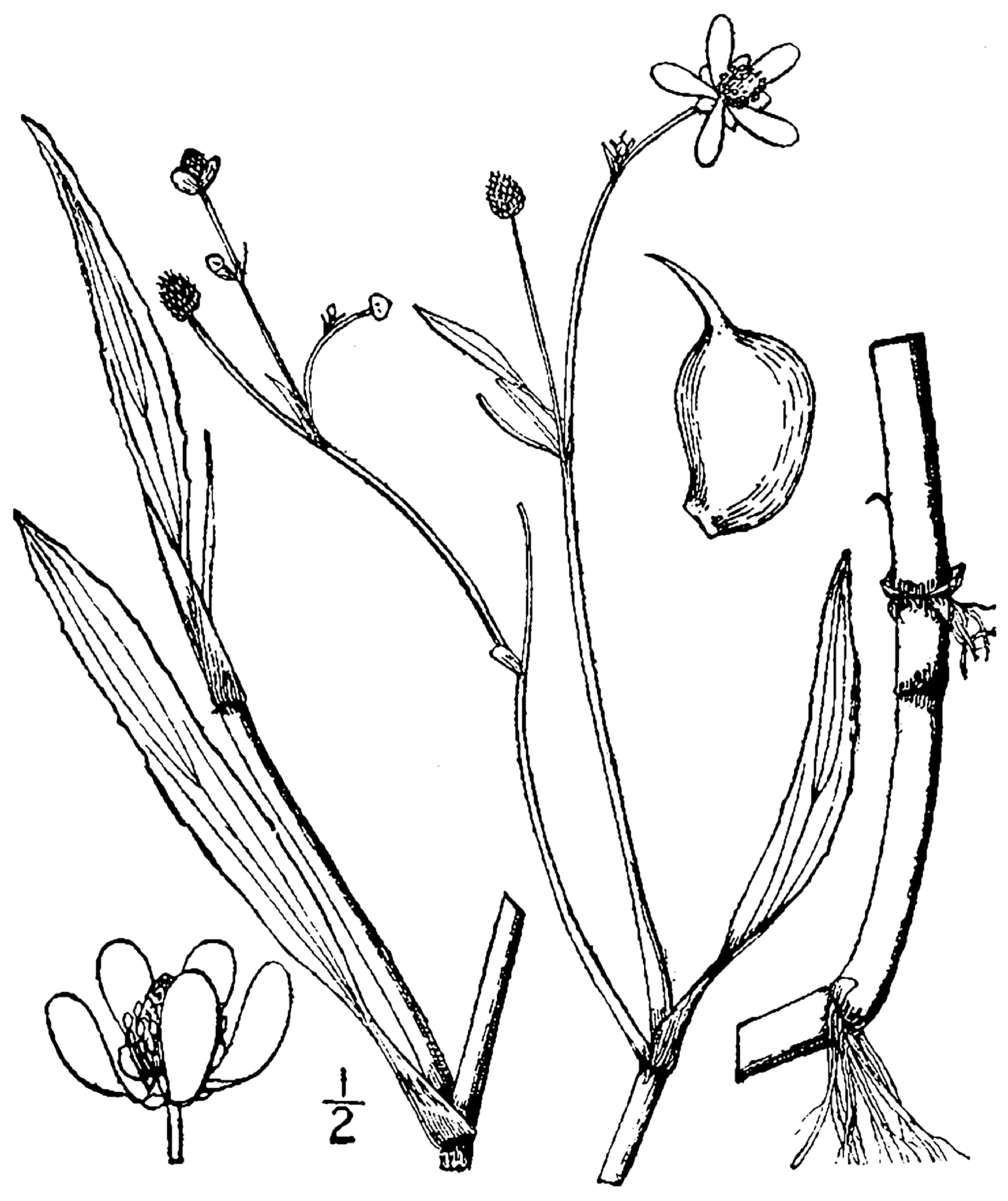

Scientific classification
- Kingdom: Plantae
- Clade: Tracheophytes
- Clade: Angiosperms
- Clade: Eudicots
- Order: Ranunculales
- Family: Ranunculaceae
- Genus: Ranunculus
- Species: R. ambigens

Binomial name
- Ranunculus ambigens S. Watson

= Ranunculus ambigens =

Species of buttercup

Ranunculus ambigens, common names water-plantain spearwort, water plantain, and spearwort, is a plant found in the eastern part of North America. It is listed as endangered in Connecticut, and New Hampshire; as endangered and extirpated in Maryland; as a special concern in Kentucky; as possibly extirpated in Maine; as threatened in Michigan; and as a special concern in Rhode Island.
