= Ranunculus orthorhynchus =

Scientific classification
- Kingdom: Plantae
- Clade: Embryophytes
- Clade: Tracheophytes
- Clade: Spermatophytes
- Clade: Angiosperms
- Clade: Eudicots
- Order: Ranunculales
- Family: Ranunculaceae
- Genus: Ranunculus
- Species: R. orthorhynchus

Binomial name
- Ranunculus orthorhynchus Hook.

Species of buttercup

Ranunculus orthorhynchus is a species of buttercup known by the common name straightbeak buttercup. It is native to western North America from Alaska to California to Utah, where it grows in moist areas in many types of habitat, including meadows and marshes.

== Description ==
It is a perennial herb, producing a stem sometimes exceeding half a meter long, which may take an erect or decumbent form. It may be hairy to hairless in texture. Leaf blades are each divided into several toothed leaflets and are borne on long petioles. The flower has five to eight shiny yellow petals each 1 to 2 centimeters long with many stamens and pistils at the center. The fruit is an achene borne in a spherical cluster.
