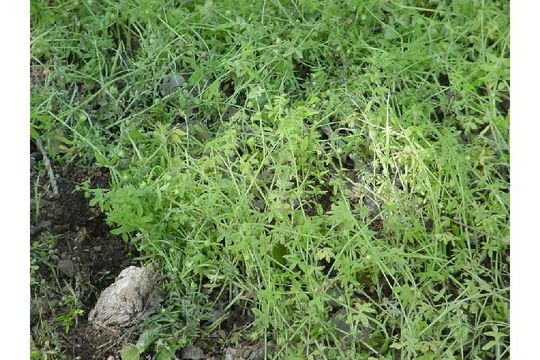

Scientific classification
- Kingdom: Plantae
- Clade: Tracheophytes
- Clade: Angiosperms
- Clade: Eudicots
- Clade: Asterids
- Order: Gentianales
- Family: Rubiaceae
- Genus: Galium
- Species: G. mexicanum

Binomial name
- Galium mexicanum Kunth

= Galium mexicanum =

Species of plant

Galium mexicanum, the Mexican bedstraw, is a species of plant in the family Rubiaceae. It has a widespread distribution from British Columbia south to Ecuador.

== Subspecies ==
Four subspecies are currently recognized (May 2014):

- Galium mexicanum subsp. asperrimum (A.Gray) Dempster - from Washington state to northern Mexico
- Galium mexicanum subsp. asperulum (A.Gray) Dempster - British Columbia, Montana, Washington, Oregon, California, Nevada
- Galium mexicanum subsp. flexicum Dempster - Texas and Coahuila
- Galium mexicanum subsp. mexicanum - from Texas to Ecuador
