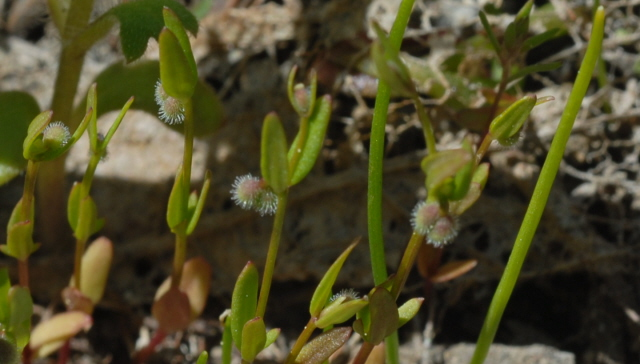

Conservation status
- Secure (NatureServe)

Scientific classification
- Kingdom: Plantae
- Clade: Tracheophytes
- Clade: Angiosperms
- Clade: Eudicots
- Clade: Asterids
- Order: Gentianales
- Family: Rubiaceae
- Genus: Galium
- Species: G. bifolium

Binomial name
- Galium bifolium S.Wats.

= Galium bifolium =

Low mountain bedstraw

Species of plant

Galium bifolium is a species of flowering plant in the coffee family known by the common names twinleaf bedstraw and low mountain bedstraw. It is native to western North America from British Columbia south to California and east to New Mexico, Colorado, South Dakota and Alberta. It grows in mountain forests and high-elevation plateaus.

Galium bifolium is an annual herb standing erect to a maximum height of about 15 centimeters. Leaves grow in whorls of four divided into two pairs. The foliage is hairless and sometimes slightly fleshy. The solitary flowers have three white tepals and the fruit is a round nutlet covered in shiny white hairs.
