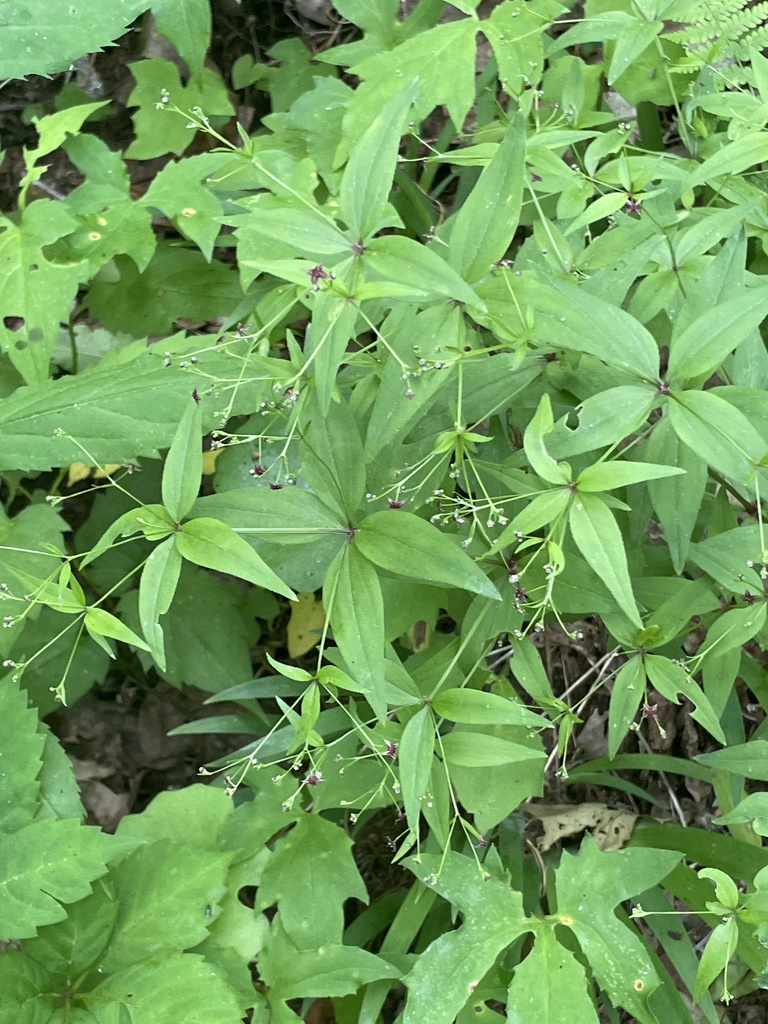
- In situ at Blood Mountain, Georgia

Conservation status
- Secure (NatureServe)

Scientific classification
- Kingdom: Plantae
- Clade: Tracheophytes
- Clade: Angiosperms
- Clade: Eudicots
- Clade: Asterids
- Order: Gentianales
- Family: Rubiaceae
- Genus: Galium
- Species: G. lanceolatum

Binomial name
- Galium lanceolatum (Torr. & A.Gray) Torr.

Synonyms
- Galium circaezans var. lanceolatum Torr. & A.Gray; Galium rotundifolium var. lanceolatum (Torr.) Kuntze; Galium torreyi Bigelow

= Galium lanceolatum =

Lanceleaf wild licorice

Species of plant

Galium lanceolatum, commonly known as lanceleaf wild licorice or Torrey's wild licorice, is a species of flowering plant native to the eastern temperate regions of North America. The name 'wild licorice' comes from the species' taste, similar to that of true licorice (genus Glycyrrhiza).

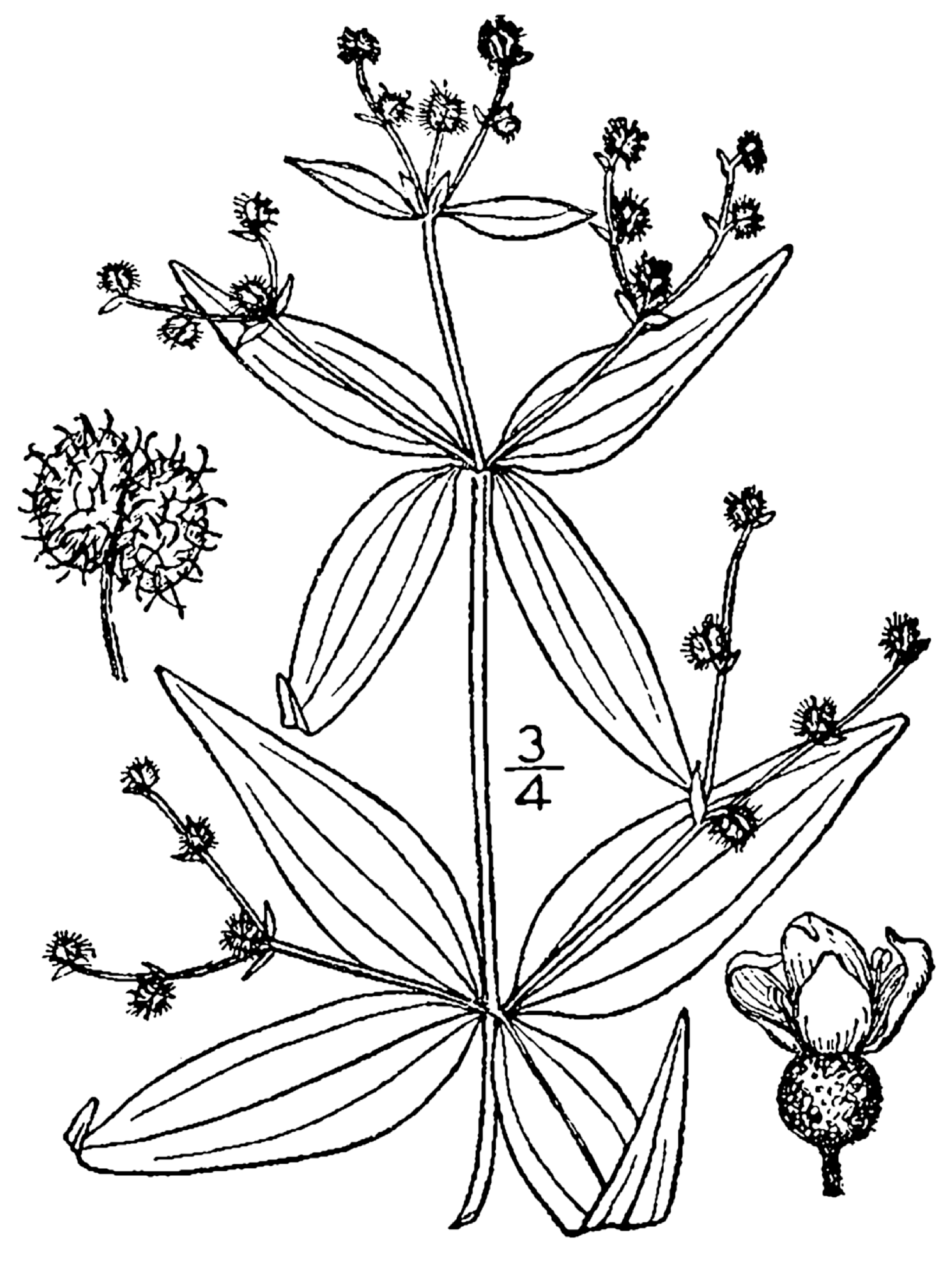
A 1913 folio from an Illustrated flora

== Description ==
A herbaceous perennial, this species bears lanceolate leaves with prominent veins in whorls of four. The sessile flowers are borne in branching terminal clusters; they are cream colored when they first open but quickly turn purple as they age. The fruits consist of bristly bi-lobed capsules.

== Distribution ==
Galium lanceolatum is native to the eastern United States as well as southeastern Canada, primarily the Great Lakes region and Appalachian Mountains. In Canada, they are only found in Southern Quebec and Ontario. In the United States, they are found north from New England down south along the Appalachians. They range as far south as north Georgia, northeastern Alabama, and northwestern South Carolina where they are primarily known from the Ridge and Valley ecoregion as well as the Blue Ridge ecoregion.

== Ecology ==
Almost strictly a forest species, they are known primarily from mesic forests and wooded slopes. In the Appalachian portions of their range where they are often found in rich cove forests. This species typically flowers in June and July, but further south in their range they can begin flowering in late May.
