= Rubus alumnus =

- In flower at Great River Bluffs State Park, Minnesota

Scientific classification
- Kingdom: Plantae
- Clade: Tracheophytes
- Clade: Angiosperms
- Clade: Eudicots
- Clade: Rosids
- Order: Rosales
- Family: Rosaceae
- Genus: Rubus
- Species: R. alumnus

Binomial name
- Rubus alumnus L.H.Bailey 1923

Synonyms
- Synonymy: Rubus apianus L.H.Bailey; Rubus barbarus L.H.Bailey; Rubus bellobatus L.H.Bailey; Rubus campester L.H.Bailey; Rubus corei L.H.Bailey; Rubus facetus L.H.Bailey; Rubus fernaldianus L.H.Bailey; Rubus impos L.H.Bailey; Rubus independens L.H.Bailey; Rubus licitus L.H.Bailey; Rubus miriflorus L.H.Bailey; Rubus ostryifolius Rydb.; Rubus parcifrondifer L.H.Bailey; Rubus pubifolius L.H.Bailey; Rubus tennesseanus L.H.Bailey

Berry and plant

Rubus alumnus is a North American species of highbush blackberry in section Alleghenienses of the genus Rubus, a member of the rose family.

It is native to eastern and central Canada (Ontario, Québec, Nova Scotia) and the eastern and central United States (from Maine south to North Carolina and west as far as Oklahoma, Kansas, and Minnesota).
