= Rubus kennedyanus =

Scientific classification
- Kingdom: Plantae
- Clade: Tracheophytes
- Clade: Angiosperms
- Clade: Eudicots
- Clade: Rosids
- Order: Rosales
- Family: Rosaceae
- Genus: Rubus
- Species: R. kennedyanus

Binomial name
- Rubus kennedyanus Fernald 1931

Synonyms
- Rubus acridens L.H.Bailey; Rubus darlingtonii L.H.Bailey; Rubus lepagei L.H.Bailey; Rubus ulterior L.H.Bailey

Species of fruit and plant

Rubus kennedyanus is a rare North American species of brambles in the rose family. It is found in eastern Canada (Québec and Newfoundland) and in the north-central United States (Minnesota, Michigan, Wisconsin).

Rubus kennedyanus is a bristly shrub. Leaves are compound with 3 or 5 egg-shaped leaflets, each leaflet with a distinctive long, narrow tip at the end. Flowers are in small groups of 1–3.

The genetics of Rubus is extremely complex, so that it is difficult to decide on which groups should be recognized as species. There are many rare species with limited ranges such as this. Further study is suggested to clarify the taxonomy.
