= Rubus fraternalis =

Scientific classification
- Kingdom: Plantae
- Clade: Tracheophytes
- Clade: Angiosperms
- Clade: Eudicots
- Clade: Rosids
- Order: Rosales
- Family: Rosaceae
- Genus: Rubus
- Species: R. fraternalis

Binomial name
- Rubus fraternalis L.H.Bailey 1925

Synonyms
- Rubus fraternus Brainerd & Peitersen 1920, illegitimate homonym not Gremli 1870; Rubus alius L.H.Bailey

Species of fruit and plant

Rubus fraternalis is an uncommon North American species of flowering plant in the rose family. It has been found in Québec and in the northeastern United States (Maine, New Hampshire, Vermont, Massachusetts, and Connecticut).

The genetics of Rubus is extremely complex, so that it is difficult to decide on which groups should be recognized as species. There are many rare species with limited ranges such as this. Further study is suggested to clarify the taxonomy. Some studies have suggested that R. fraternalis may have originated as a hybrid between R. allegheniensis and R. flagellaris.
