= Rubus russeus =

Scientific classification
- Kingdom: Plantae
- Clade: Tracheophytes
- Clade: Angiosperms
- Clade: Eudicots
- Clade: Rosids
- Order: Rosales
- Family: Rosaceae
- Genus: Rubus
- Species: R. russeus

Binomial name
- Rubus russeus L.H.Bailey

Synonyms
- Rubus canaanensis H.A.Davis & T.Davis

Species of fruit and plant

Rubus russeus is a rare North American species of brambles in the rose family. It has been found in eastern Canada (New Brunswick and Nova Scotia) and in the northeastern United States (Pennsylvania and West Virginia).

The genetics of Rubus is extremely complex, so that it is difficult to decide on which groups should be recognized as species. There are many rare species with limited ranges such as this. Further study is suggested to clarify the taxonomy.
