= Rubus suppar =

Scientific classification
- Kingdom: Plantae
- Clade: Tracheophytes
- Clade: Angiosperms
- Clade: Eudicots
- Clade: Rosids
- Order: Rosales
- Family: Rosaceae
- Genus: Rubus
- Species: R. suppar

Binomial name
- Rubus suppar L.H.Bailey

Species of fruit and plant

Rubus suppar is an uncommon North American species of brambles in the rose family. It has been found only in the Provinces of New Brunswick and Nova Scotia in eastern Canada.

The genetics of Rubus is extremely complex, so that it is difficult to decide on which groups should be recognized as species. There are many rare species with limited ranges such as this. Further study is suggested to clarify the taxonomy.
