= Rubus particeps =

Scientific classification
- Kingdom: Plantae
- Clade: Tracheophytes
- Clade: Angiosperms
- Clade: Eudicots
- Clade: Rosids
- Order: Rosales
- Family: Rosaceae
- Genus: Rubus
- Species: R. particeps

Binomial name
- Rubus particeps L.H.Bailey

Synonyms
- Rubus eflagellaris L.H.Bailey

Species of fruit and plant

Rubus particeps is rare North American species of brambles in the rose family. It has been found only in the State of Connecticut in the northeastern United States, and the Province of Nova Scotia in eastern Canada.

The genetics of Rubus is extremely complex, so that it is difficult to decide on which groups should be recognized as species. There are many rare species with limited ranges such as this. Further study is suggested to clarify the taxonomy.
