= Rubus arcuans =

Scientific classification
- Kingdom: Plantae
- Clade: Embryophytes
- Clade: Tracheophytes
- Clade: Spermatophytes
- Clade: Angiosperms
- Clade: Eudicots
- Clade: Rosids
- Order: Rosales
- Family: Rosaceae
- Genus: Rubus
- Species: R. arcuans

Binomial name
- Rubus arcuans Fernald & H.St.John 1921

Species of fruit and plant

Rubus arcuans, the wand dewberry, is a rare North American species of flowering plant in the rose family. It is found in eastern Canada (Québec, Nova Scotia, Prince Edward Island) the northeastern United States (Massachusetts, Maine).

The genetics of Rubus is extremely complex, so that it is difficult to decide on which groups should be recognized as species. There are many rare species with limited ranges such as this. Further study is suggested to clarify the taxonomy. Some studies have suggested that R. arcuans may have originated as a hybrid between R. setosus and R. flagellaris.
