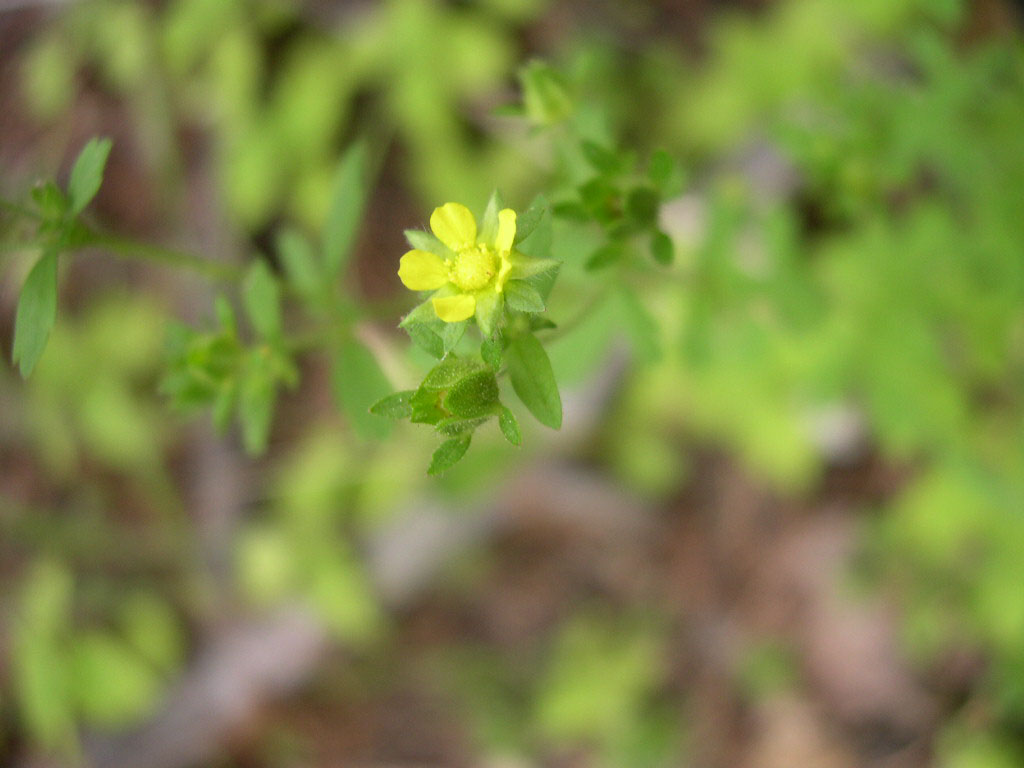

Scientific classification
- Kingdom: Plantae
- Clade: Tracheophytes
- Clade: Angiosperms
- Clade: Eudicots
- Clade: Rosids
- Order: Rosales
- Family: Rosaceae
- Genus: Potentilla
- Species: P. biennis

Binomial name
- Potentilla biennis Greene

= Potentilla biennis =

Species of flowering plant

Potentilla biennis is a species of cinquefoil known by the common names biennial cinquefoil and Greene's cinquefoil. It is native to western North America from northwestern Canada to the southwestern United States, where it grows in moist habitat. This is an annual or biennial herb producing an erect stem up to 70 centimeters tall from a taproot. It is hairy and glandular in texture. The hairy leaves are each divided into three toothed, oval leaflets each up to 3 centimeters long. The inflorescence is a cyme of several flowers. Each flower has five oval yellow petals 1 or 2 millimeters long and five triangular sepals which are slightly longer. The fruit is a minute whitish achene.
