= Rubus roribaccus =

Scientific classification
- Kingdom: Plantae
- Clade: Tracheophytes
- Clade: Angiosperms
- Clade: Eudicots
- Clade: Rosids
- Order: Rosales
- Family: Rosaceae
- Genus: Rubus
- Species: R. roribaccus

Binomial name
- Rubus roribaccus (L.H.Bailey) Rydb.

Synonyms
- Synonymy: Rubus canadensis var. roribaccus L.H.Bailey 1890; Rubus flagellaris var. roribaccus (L.H.Bailey) L.H.Bailey; Rubus procumbens var. roribaccus (L.H.Bailey) L.H.Bailey; Rubus villosus var. roribaccus (L.H.Bailey) L.H.Bailey; Rubus flagellaris var. occidualis L.H.Bailey; Rubus imperiorum Fernald; Rubus injunctus L.H.Bailey; Rubus occidualis (L.H.Bailey) L.H.Bailey; Rubus pauperrimus L.H.Bailey; Rubus pluralis (L.H.Bailey) L.H.Bailey; Rubus temerarius L.H.Bailey

Berry and plant

Rubus roribaccus is a North American species of dewberry in the genus Rubus, a member of the rose family. It is commonly known as Lucretia dewberry and velvet-leaf dewberry. It grows in eastern Canada (Québec) and the eastern and central United States (from New York and Massachusetts south to the Carolinas and west as far as Oklahoma, Kansas, and Nebraska).
