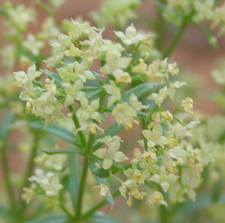

Scientific classification
- Kingdom: Plantae
- Clade: Tracheophytes
- Clade: Angiosperms
- Clade: Eudicots
- Clade: Asterids
- Order: Gentianales
- Family: Rubiaceae
- Genus: Galium
- Species: G. multiflorum

Binomial name
- Galium multiflorum Kellogg

= Galium multiflorum =

Species of plant

Galium multiflorum is a species of flowering plant in the coffee family known by the common names Kellogg's bedstraw, shrubby bedstraw, and many-flowered bedstraw. It is a perennial herb that grows on rocky soils, mountains, and desert slopes.

== Description ==
Galium multiflorum is a tough perennial herb growing from a woody base and forming thin, erect stems to about 35 centimeters in height. Leaves are arranged in whorls of four, in two pairs, about the stem at intervals. They are small, oval-shaped, and pointed. The plant is dioecious, and male and female flowers are similar, appearing in clusters of white to pinkish corollas at the ends of the stems. The fruit is a nutlet covered in very long, straight white hairs.

== Distribution and habitat ==
Galium multiflorum is native to the mountains, desert slopes, and plateaus of the Great Basin region and other drier areas of the West, where it grows in rocky soils in dry sagebrush country. The plant's range includes much of California, Nevada and Utah, as well as northern Arizona.
