= Rubus biformispinus =

Scientific classification
- Kingdom: Plantae
- Clade: Embryophytes
- Clade: Tracheophytes
- Clade: Spermatophytes
- Clade: Angiosperms
- Clade: Eudicots
- Clade: Rosids
- Order: Rosales
- Family: Rosaceae
- Genus: Rubus
- Species: R. biformispinus

Binomial name
- Rubus biformispinus Blanch. 1906

Species of flowering plant

Rubus biformispinus, the pasture dewberry, is an uncommon North American species of flowering plant in the rose family. It is found in eastern and central Canada (from Ontario to Nova Scotia) and the northeastern United States (Maine, New York, Pennsylvania).

The epithet biformispinus means "with spines of two shapes", referring to the two distinct sizes of prickles on the stems.

The genetics of Rubus is extremely complex, so that it is difficult to decide on which groups should be recognized as species. There are many rare species with limited ranges such as this. Further study is suggested to clarify the taxonomy. Some studies have suggested that R. biformispinus may have originated as a hybrid between R. setosus and R. flagellaris.
