= Rubus glandicaulis =

Scientific classification
- Kingdom: Plantae
- Clade: Tracheophytes
- Clade: Angiosperms
- Clade: Eudicots
- Clade: Rosids
- Order: Rosales
- Family: Rosaceae
- Genus: Rubus
- Species: R. glandicaulis

Binomial name
- Rubus glandicaulis Blanch. 1906

Synonyms
- Rubus acadiensis L.H.Bailey; Rubus atwoodii L.H.Bailey; Rubus blakei L.H.Bailey; Rubus bracteoliferus Fernald; Rubus grandidens L.H.Bailey; Rubus montpelierensis Blanch. ex L.H.Bailey

Species of fruit and plant

Rubus glandicaulis is a North American species of flowering plant in the rose family. It is native to eastern and central Canada (Québec, Ontario, and the 3 Maritime Provinces) and the northeastern and north-central United States (Wisconsin, Michigan, New York, Massachusetts, Vermont, New Hampshire, Maine).

Rubus glandicaulis is an erect shrub with perennial roots and hairy and prickly biennial shoots up to 6 feet (180 cm) tall. Leaves have 3 or 5 leaflets.

The genetics of Rubus is extremely complex, so that it is difficult to decide on which groups should be recognized as species. There are many rare species with limited ranges such as this. Further study is suggested to clarify the taxonomy.
