= Rubus arenicola =

Scientific classification
- Kingdom: Plantae
- Clade: Tracheophytes
- Clade: Angiosperms
- Clade: Eudicots
- Clade: Rosids
- Order: Rosales
- Family: Rosaceae
- Genus: Rubus
- Species: R. arenicola

Binomial name
- Rubus arenicola Blanch. 1906

Synonyms
- Rubus arenicolus Blanch.

Berry and plant

Rubus arenicola, the sanddwelling dewberry, is an uncommon North American species of flowering plant in the rose family. It is found in eastern Canada (Nova Scotia) and the northeastern United States (New York, Massachusetts, Maine, New Hampshire, Rhode Island).

The genetics of Rubus is extremely complex, so that it is difficult to decide on which groups should be recognized as species. There are many rare species with limited ranges such as this. Further study is suggested to clarify the taxonomy.
