= Rubus frondisentis =

Scientific classification
- Kingdom: Plantae
- Clade: Tracheophytes
- Clade: Angiosperms
- Clade: Eudicots
- Clade: Rosids
- Order: Rosales
- Family: Rosaceae
- Genus: Rubus
- Species: R. frondisentis

Binomial name
- Rubus frondisentis [Blanch. 1906

Synonyms
- Rubus ravus L.H.Bailey

Species of fruit and plant

Rubus frondisentis is an uncommon North American species of flowering plant in the rose family. It has been found in Québec and in the northeastern United States (Maine, New Hampshire, Vermont, New York).

The genetics of Rubus is extremely complex, so that it is difficult to decide on which groups should be recognized as species. There are many rare species with limited ranges such as this. Further study is suggested to clarify the taxonomy. Some studies have suggested that R. frondisentis may have originated as a hybrid between R. allegheniensis and R. setosus.
