= Rubus paganus =

Scientific classification
- Kingdom: Plantae
- Clade: Tracheophytes
- Clade: Angiosperms
- Clade: Eudicots
- Clade: Rosids
- Order: Rosales
- Family: Rosaceae
- Genus: Rubus
- Species: R. paganus

Binomial name
- Rubus paganus L.H.Bailey 1941

Synonyms
- Rubus vagulus L.H.Bailey; Rubus zaplutus L.H.Bailey

Species of fruit and plant

Rubus paganus is an uncommon North American species of brambles in the rose family. It grows in the Province of Québec in eastern Canada and also in the northeastern United States (New York, Maryland, Pennsylvania, West Virginia). Nowhere is it very common.

The genetics of Rubus is extremely complex, so that it is difficult to decide on which groups should be recognized as species. There are many rare species with limited ranges such as this. Further study is suggested to clarify the taxonomy.
