= Rubus baileyanus =

Scientific classification
- Kingdom: Plantae
- Clade: Tracheophytes
- Clade: Angiosperms
- Clade: Eudicots
- Clade: Rosids
- Order: Rosales
- Family: Rosaceae
- Genus: Rubus
- Species: R. baileyanus

Binomial name
- Rubus baileyanus Britton 1894

Synonyms
- Rubus villosus var. humifusus Torr. & A. Gray 1840 not Rubus humifusus Weihe & Nees 1821; Rubus flagellaris var. humifusus (Torr. & A.Gray) B.Boivin; Rubus housei L.H.Bailey; Rubus tenuicaulis L.H.Bailey; Rubus unifloriferL.H.Bailey

Berry and plant

Rubus baileyanus, common name Bailey's dewberry, is a North American species of dewberry in section Flagellares of the genus Rubus, a member of the rose family. It is found in scattered locations in central Canada and in the eastern and north-central United States, primarily in the Appalachian Mountains. Its range extends from Massachusetts, Ontario, and Wisconsin south as far as Missouri, Tennessee, and North Carolina, though it is not common in any of those places.
