= Rubus tardatus =

Scientific classification
- Kingdom: Plantae
- Clade: Tracheophytes
- Clade: Angiosperms
- Clade: Eudicots
- Clade: Rosids
- Order: Rosales
- Family: Rosaceae
- Genus: Rubus
- Species: R. tardatus

Binomial name
- Rubus tardatus Blanch.

Species of fruit and plant

Rubus tardatus is a rare North American species of flowering plant in the rose family. It is native to eastern and central Canada (Québec, Ontario, Nova Scotia) and the northeastern and north-central United States (Maine, Vermont, Michigan, Pennsylvania).

The genetics of Rubus is extremely complex, so that it is difficult to decide on which groups should be recognized as species. There are many rare species with limited ranges such as this. Further study is suggested to clarify the taxonomy. Some studies have suggested that R. tardatus may have originated as a hybrid between R. setosus and R. hispidus.
