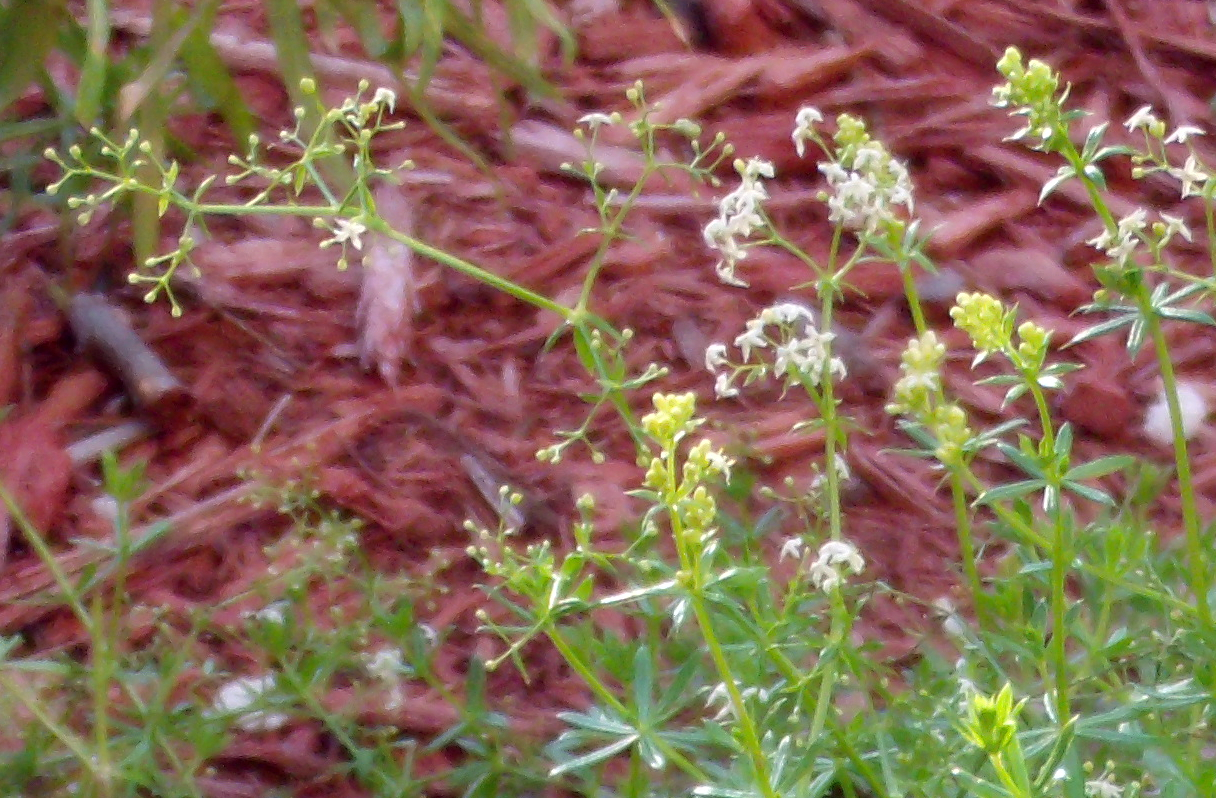
- Buds, flowers and seed capsules of Galium asprellum

Scientific classification
- Kingdom: Plantae
- Clade: Tracheophytes
- Clade: Angiosperms
- Clade: Eudicots
- Clade: Asterids
- Order: Gentianales
- Family: Rubiaceae
- Genus: Galium
- Species: G. asprellum

Binomial name
- Galium asprellum Michx.

= Galium asprellum =

Rough bedstraw

Species of plant

Galium asprellum, the rough bedstraw, is a plant species in the family Rubiaceae. It is native to eastern Canada and northeastern United States, from North Carolina and Tennessee north to Minnesota, Ontario and Newfoundland. It is considered a noxious weed in New York, Pennsylvania and Vermont, and is abundantly common in the other New England states and in sections of the Great Lakes region. It is a perennial herb. Leaves are simple with three or more leaves per node. Flowers have four petals and are white in color.
