= Rubus heterophyllus =

Scientific classification
- Kingdom: Plantae
- Clade: Embryophytes
- Clade: Tracheophytes
- Clade: Spermatophytes
- Clade: Angiosperms
- Clade: Eudicots
- Clade: Rosids
- Order: Rosales
- Family: Rosaceae
- Genus: Rubus
- Species: R. heterophyllus

Binomial name
- Rubus heterophyllus Willd. 1814 not Hegetschw. 1839 nor Host 1831

Synonyms
- Synonymy: Rubus armatus (Fernald) L.H.Bailey; Rubus botruosus L.H.Bailey; Rubus bretonis L.H.Bailey; Rubus coloniatus L.H.Bailey; Rubus exutus L.H.Bailey; Rubus obsessus var. unilaris L.H.Bailey; Rubus pauper L.H.Bailey; Rubus plicatifolius Blanch.; Rubus polulus L.H.Bailey; Rubus prior L.H.Bailey; Rubus problematicus L.H.Bailey; Rubus procumbens Rydb.; Rubus pronus L.H.Bailey; Rubus recurvicaulis var. armatus Fernald; Rubus rhodinsulanus L.H.Bailey; Rubus rosendahlii L.H.Bailey; Rubus semierectus Blanch.; Rubus usus L.H.Bailey; Rubus varus L.H.Bailey; Rubus victorinii L.H.Bailey

Species of fruit and plant

Rubus heterophyllus is a North American species of dewberry in the genus Rubus, a member of the rose family. It was formerly known as Rubus plicatifolius Blanch. until R. heterophyllus Willd. was determined to be an earlier name for the species.

It grows throughout the Midwest and northeastern United States, ranging from parts of Minnesota, Iowa, and Illinois east to Nova Scotia (Canada), Maine, and Virginia.
