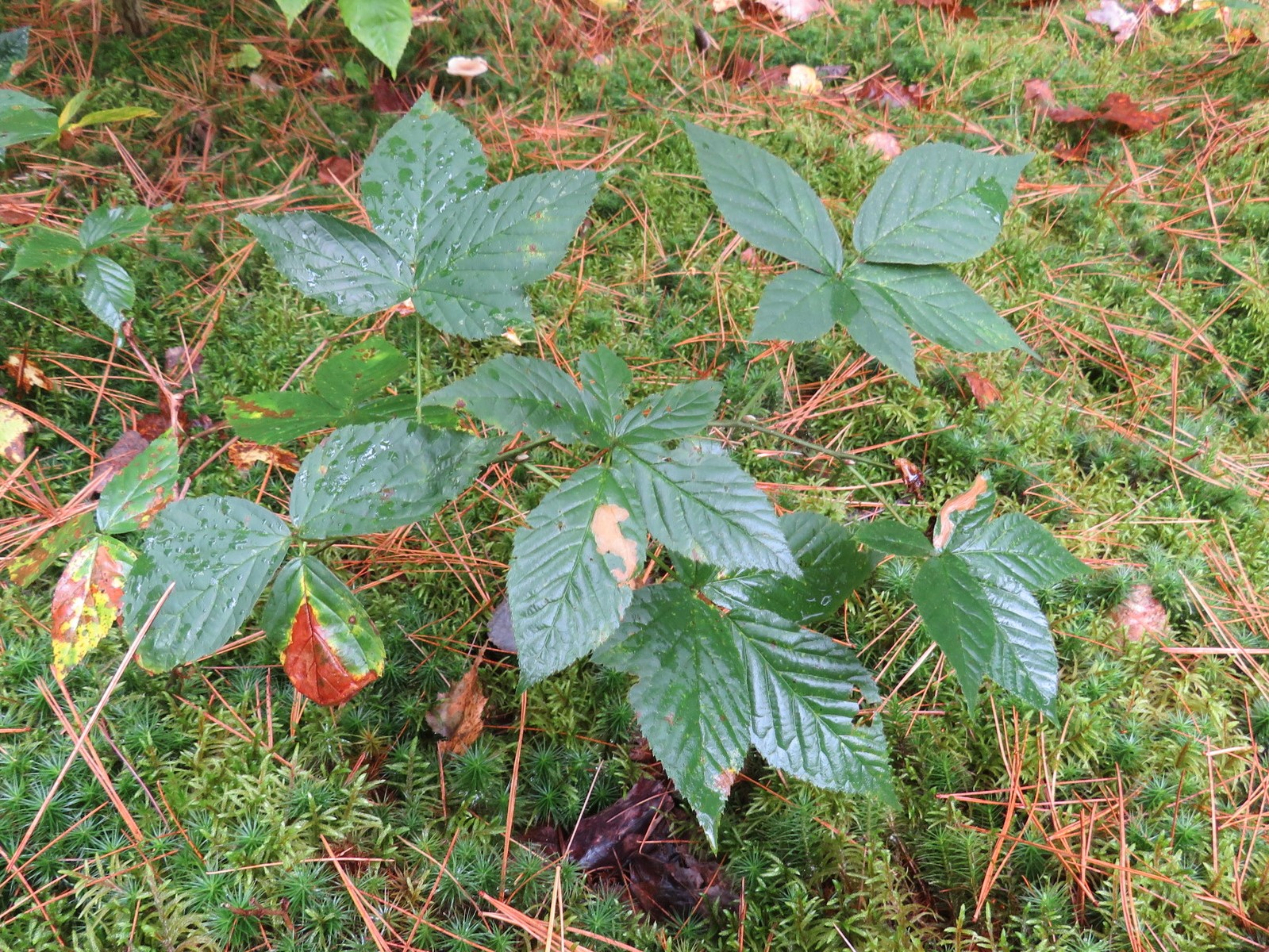

Scientific classification
- Kingdom: Plantae
- Clade: Tracheophytes
- Clade: Angiosperms
- Clade: Eudicots
- Clade: Rosids
- Order: Rosales
- Family: Rosaceae
- Genus: Rubus
- Species: R. jacens

Binomial name
- Rubus jacens Blanch. 1906

= Rubus jacens =

Species of fruit and plant

Rubus jacens is a rare species of flowering plant in the rose family. It is native to eastern Canada (Ontario, Québec, Nova Scotia) and the north-eastern United States (New Hampshire, Vermont, New York, Pennsylvania).

The genetics of Rubus is extremely complex, so that it is difficult to decide on which groups should be recognized as species. There are many rare species with limited ranges such as this. Further study is suggested to clarify the taxonomy. Some studies have suggested that R. jacens may have originated as a hybrid between R. setosus and R. hispidus.
