= Rubus junceus =

Scientific classification
- Kingdom: Plantae
- Clade: Tracheophytes
- Clade: Angiosperms
- Clade: Eudicots
- Clade: Rosids
- Order: Rosales
- Family: Rosaceae
- Genus: Rubus
- Species: R. junceus

Binomial name
- Rubus junceus Blanch. 1906

Species of fruit and plant

Rubus junceus is a North American species of flowering plants in the rose family. It has been found in Nova Scotia and also in the northeastern and north-central United States (Minnesota, Wisconsin, Michigan, Maine, New Hampshire, and Vermont).

The genetics of Rubus is extremely complex, so that it is difficult to decide on which groups should be recognized as species. There are many rare species with limited ranges such as this. Further study is suggested to clarify the taxonomy.
