= Rubus adenocaulis =

Scientific classification
- Kingdom: Plantae
- Clade: Tracheophytes
- Clade: Angiosperms
- Clade: Eudicots
- Clade: Rosids
- Order: Rosales
- Family: Rosaceae
- Genus: Rubus
- Species: R. adenocaulis

Binomial name
- Rubus adenocaulis Fernald 1940

Species of fruit and plant

Rubus adenocaulis is a rare North American species of flowering plant in the rose family. It has been found only in the Province of Nova Scotia in the eastern Canada.

The genetics of Rubus is extremely complex, so that it is difficult to decide on which groups should be recognized as species. There are many rare species with limited ranges such as this. Further study is suggested to clarify the taxonomy. Some studies have suggested that R. adenocaulis may have originated as a hybrid between R. allegheniensis and R. setosus.
