= Rubus adjacens =

Scientific classification
- Kingdom: Plantae
- Clade: Tracheophytes
- Clade: Angiosperms
- Clade: Eudicots
- Clade: Rosids
- Order: Rosales
- Family: Rosaceae
- Genus: Rubus
- Species: R. adjacens

Binomial name
- Rubus adjacens Fernald 1940

Berry and plant

Rubus adjacens, the peaty dewberry, is a rare North American species of flowering plant in the rose family. It is native to eastern Canada (Quebec, New Brunswick, Nova Scotia) and the northeastern and east-central United States (Maine, New Hampshire, Vermont, Massachusetts, New York, Pennsylvania, Maryland.

The genetics of Rubus is extremely complex, so that it is difficult to decide on which groups should be recognized as species. There are many rare species with limited ranges such as this. Further study is suggested to clarify the taxonomy. Some studies have suggested that R. adjacens may have originated as a hybrid between R. setosus and R. hispidus.
