= Rubus weatherbyi =

Scientific classification
- Kingdom: Plantae
- Clade: Tracheophytes
- Clade: Angiosperms
- Clade: Eudicots
- Clade: Rosids
- Order: Rosales
- Family: Rosaceae
- Genus: Rubus
- Species: R. weatherbyi

Binomial name
- Rubus weatherbyi L.H.Bailey

Species of fruit and plant

Rubus weatherbyi is a rare North American species of flowering plants in the rose family. It is found only in eastern Canada in the Provinces of New Brunswick and Nova Scotia.

The genetics of Rubus is extremely complex, so that it is difficult to decide on which groups should be recognized as species. There are many rare species with limited ranges such as this. Further study is suggested to clarify the taxonomy.
