= Rubus recurvicaulis =

Scientific classification
- Kingdom: Plantae
- Clade: Tracheophytes
- Clade: Angiosperms
- Clade: Eudicots
- Clade: Rosids
- Order: Rosales
- Family: Rosaceae
- Genus: Rubus
- Species: R. recurvicaulis

Binomial name
- Rubus recurvicaulis Blanch. 1906

Synonyms
- Rubus onustus L.H.Bailey; Rubus recurvicaulis var. inarmatus Blanch.

Species of fruit and plant

Rubus recurvicaulis is an uncommon North American species of flowering plant in the rose family. It grows in eastern and central Canada (Ontario, Québec, New Brunswick, Nova Scotia, Newfoundland) and the north-central and northeastern United States (Minnesota, Ohio, Pennsylvania, New Jersey, New York, and the 6 New England states).

The genetics of Rubus is extremely complex, so that it is difficult to decide on which groups should be recognized as species. There are many rare species with limited ranges such as this. Further study is suggested to clarify the taxonomy. Some studies have suggested that R. recurvicaulis may have originated as a hybrid between R. flagellaris and R. pensilvanicus.
