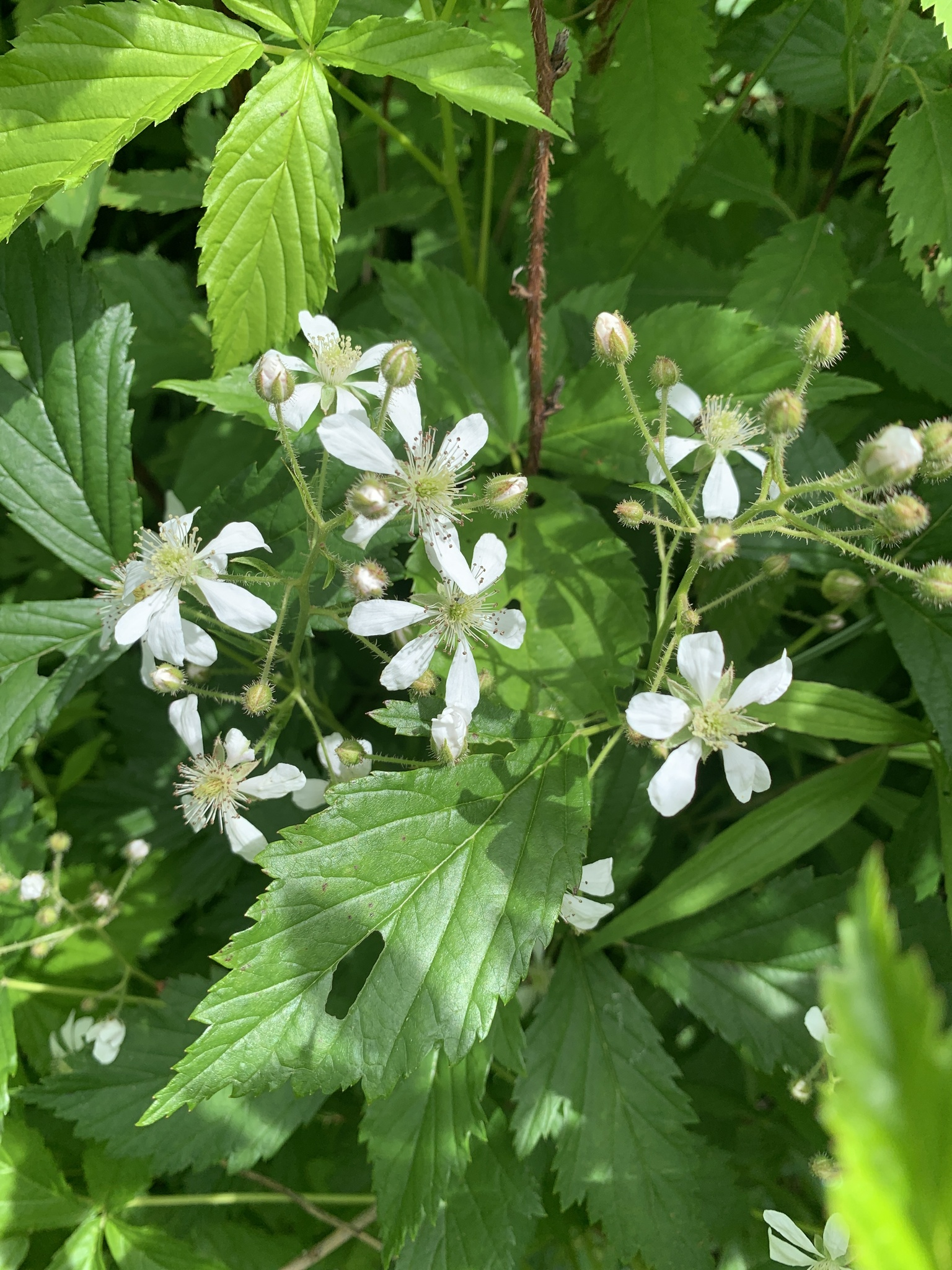

Scientific classification
- Kingdom: Plantae
- Clade: Tracheophytes
- Clade: Angiosperms
- Clade: Eudicots
- Clade: Rosids
- Order: Rosales
- Family: Rosaceae
- Genus: Rubus
- Species: R. vermontanus

Binomial name
- Rubus vermontanus Blanch. 1904

Synonyms
- List: Rubus abbrevians Blanch.; Rubus deaneanus L.H.Bailey; Rubus malus L.H.Bailey; Rubus miscix L.H.Bailey; Rubus multilicius L.H.Bailey; Rubus peculiaris Blanch.; Rubus perdebilis L.H.Bailey; Rubus quebecensis L.H.Bailey; Rubus singulus L.H.Bailey; Rubus superioris L.H.Bailey; Rubus unanimus L.H.Bailey

= Rubus vermontanus =

Species of plant

Rubus vermontanus is a North American species of bristleberry in section Setosi of the genus Rubus, a member of the rose family. It is found in eastern and central Canada (Québec, Ontario, Newfoundland, and all 3 Maritime Provinces) and the northeastern and north-central United States (Minnesota, Wisconsin, Michigan, Pennsylvania, New York, and all 6 New England States).
