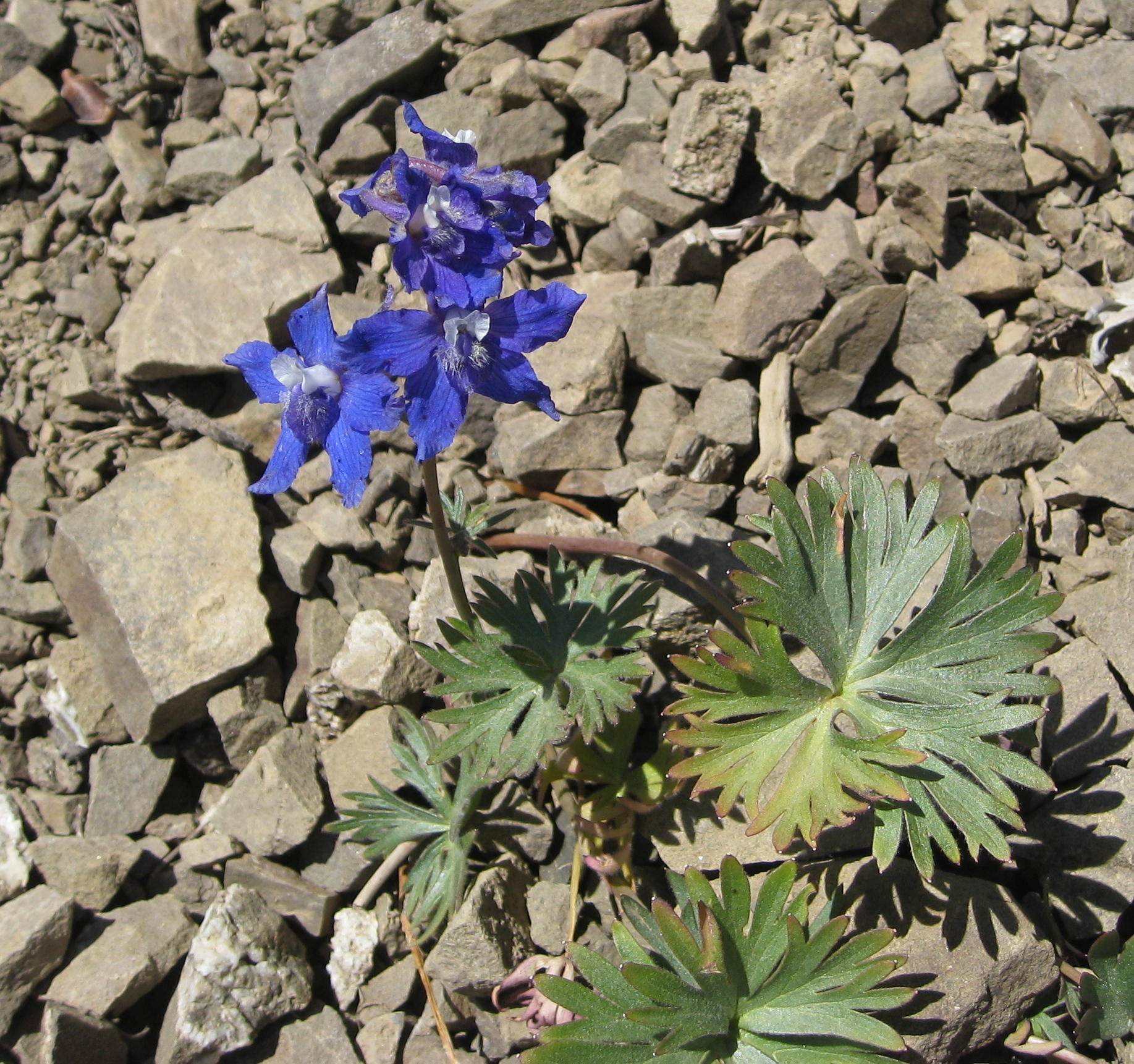

Scientific classification
- Kingdom: Plantae
- Clade: Tracheophytes
- Clade: Angiosperms
- Clade: Eudicots
- Order: Ranunculales
- Family: Ranunculaceae
- Genus: Delphinium
- Species: D. glareosum

Binomial name
- Delphinium glareosum Greene

Subspecies
- Delphinium glareosum subsp. caprorum (Ewan) Ewan; Delphinium glareosum subsp. glareosum

Synonyms
- Delphinium bicolor var. glareosum (Greene)

= Delphinium glareosum =

Species of larkspur

Delphinium glareosum (common names include Olympic Mountain larkspur and rockslide larkspur) is a species of larkspur which grows in Oregon, Washington, and British Columbia. It is in the Ranunculaceae (buttercup family). These plants favor rocky slopes. They flower in summer. Like all members of the genus Delphinium, rockslide larkspur is poisonous.

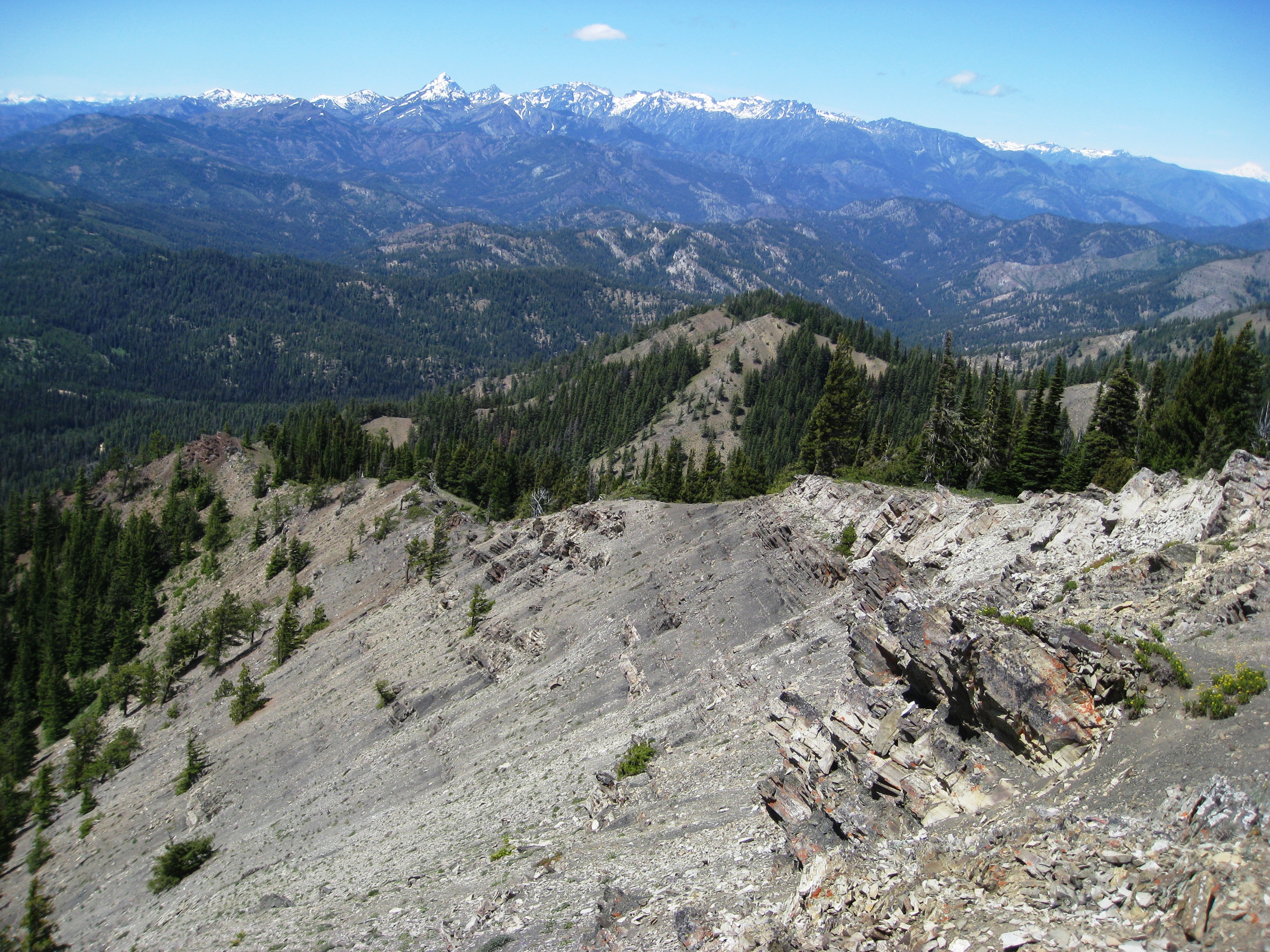
Typical habitat of rockslide larkspur, in Wenatchee National Forest.
