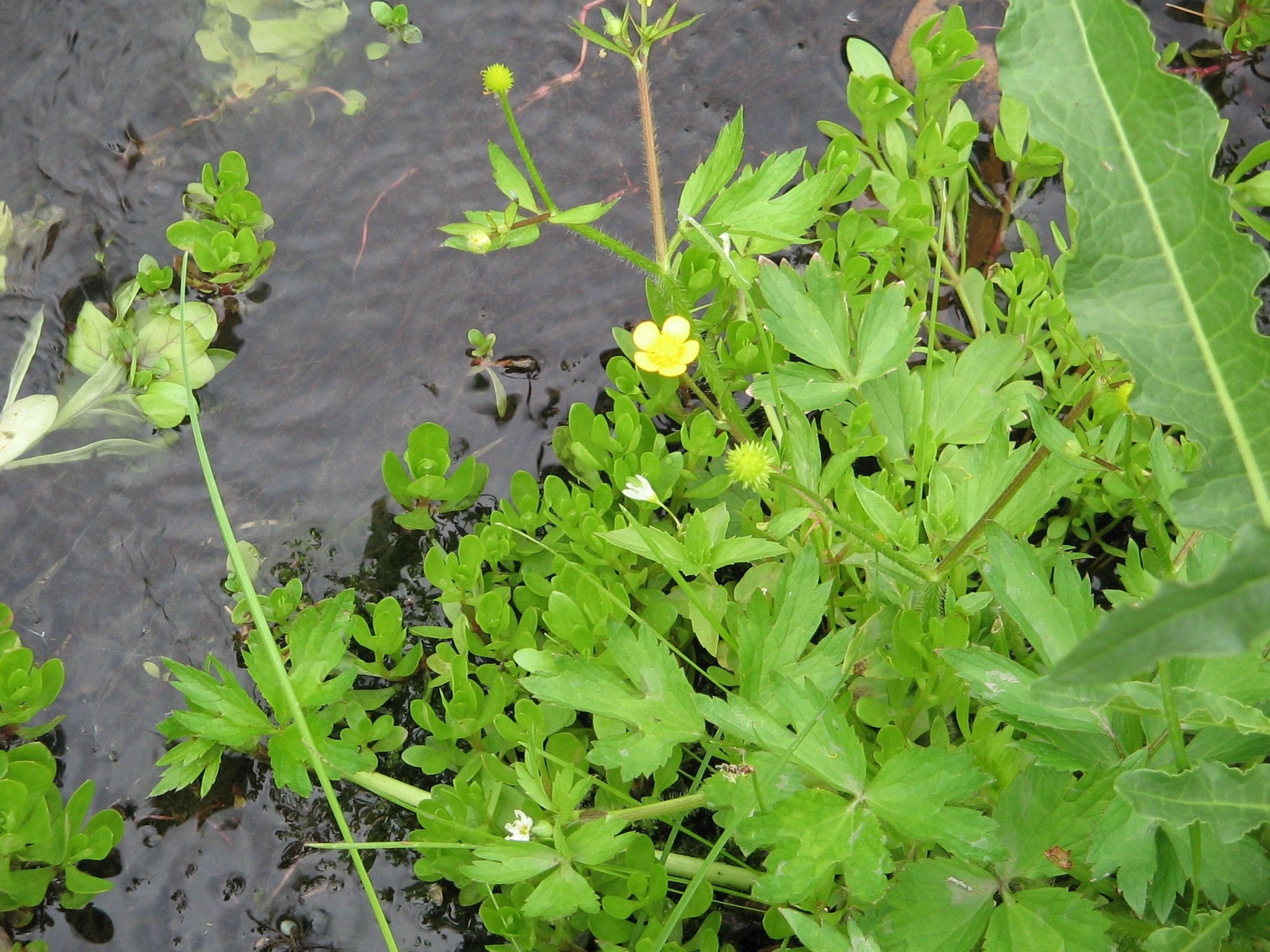

Scientific classification
- Kingdom: Plantae
- Clade: Tracheophytes
- Clade: Angiosperms
- Clade: Eudicots
- Order: Ranunculales
- Family: Ranunculaceae
- Genus: Ranunculus
- Species: R. macounii

Binomial name
- Ranunculus macounii Britton

= Ranunculus macounii =

Species of buttercup

Ranunculus macounii is a species of buttercup known by the common name Macoun's buttercup. It is native to much of North America, from Alaska and northwestern Canada to Newfoundland and Labrador, and the contiguous United States except for the northeast and southeastern areas. It grows in many types of moist habitat, including marshes and wet areas woodlands and scrub. It is generally semi-aquatic, growing in or next to shallow water, or in muddy places. It is a perennial herb producing prostrate, spreading stems that root at nodes that come in contact with moist substrate, or growing erect and branching. The stems are generally hairy, but populations of hairless specimens are known. The leaves are mostly divided into three lobed, toothed leaflets which are borne on long, hairy petioles. The flowers each have five shiny yellow petals under a centimeter long around a center of many stamens and pistils. The fruit is an achene borne in a spherical cluster of 20 or more.
