= Rubus provincialis =

Scientific classification
- Kingdom: Plantae
- Clade: Tracheophytes
- Clade: Angiosperms
- Clade: Eudicots
- Clade: Rosids
- Order: Rosales
- Family: Rosaceae
- Genus: Rubus
- Species: R. provincialis

Binomial name
- Rubus provincialis L.H.Bailey

Synonyms
- Rubus orbicularis H.A.Davis & T.Davis

Species of fruit and plant

Rubus provincialis is an uncommon North American species of brambles in the rose family. It is found in eastern Canada (Quebec, New Brunswick, Nova Scotia) and in the northeastern and east-central United States (Maine, Pennsylvania, Maryland, West Virginia).

The genetics of Rubus is extremely complex, so that it is difficult to decide on which groups should be recognized as species. There are many rare species with limited ranges such as this. Further study is suggested to clarify the taxonomy.
