= Rubus wheeleri =

Scientific classification
- Kingdom: Plantae
- Clade: Tracheophytes
- Clade: Angiosperms
- Clade: Eudicots
- Clade: Rosids
- Order: Rosales
- Family: Rosaceae
- Genus: Rubus
- Species: R. wheeleri

Binomial name
- Rubus wheeleri (L.H.Bailey) L.H.Bailey

Synonyms
- Rubus semisetosus var. wheeleri L.H.Bailey 1932; Rubus compos L.H.Bailey; Rubus fassettii L.H.Bailey; Rubus potis L.H.Bailey; Rubus rowleei L.H.Bailey; Rubus univocus L.H.Bailey

Species of fruit and plant

Rubus wheeleri is a North American species of bristleberry in the genus Rubus, a member of the rose family. It is commonly known as Wheeler's blackberry or Wheeler's bristleberry.
