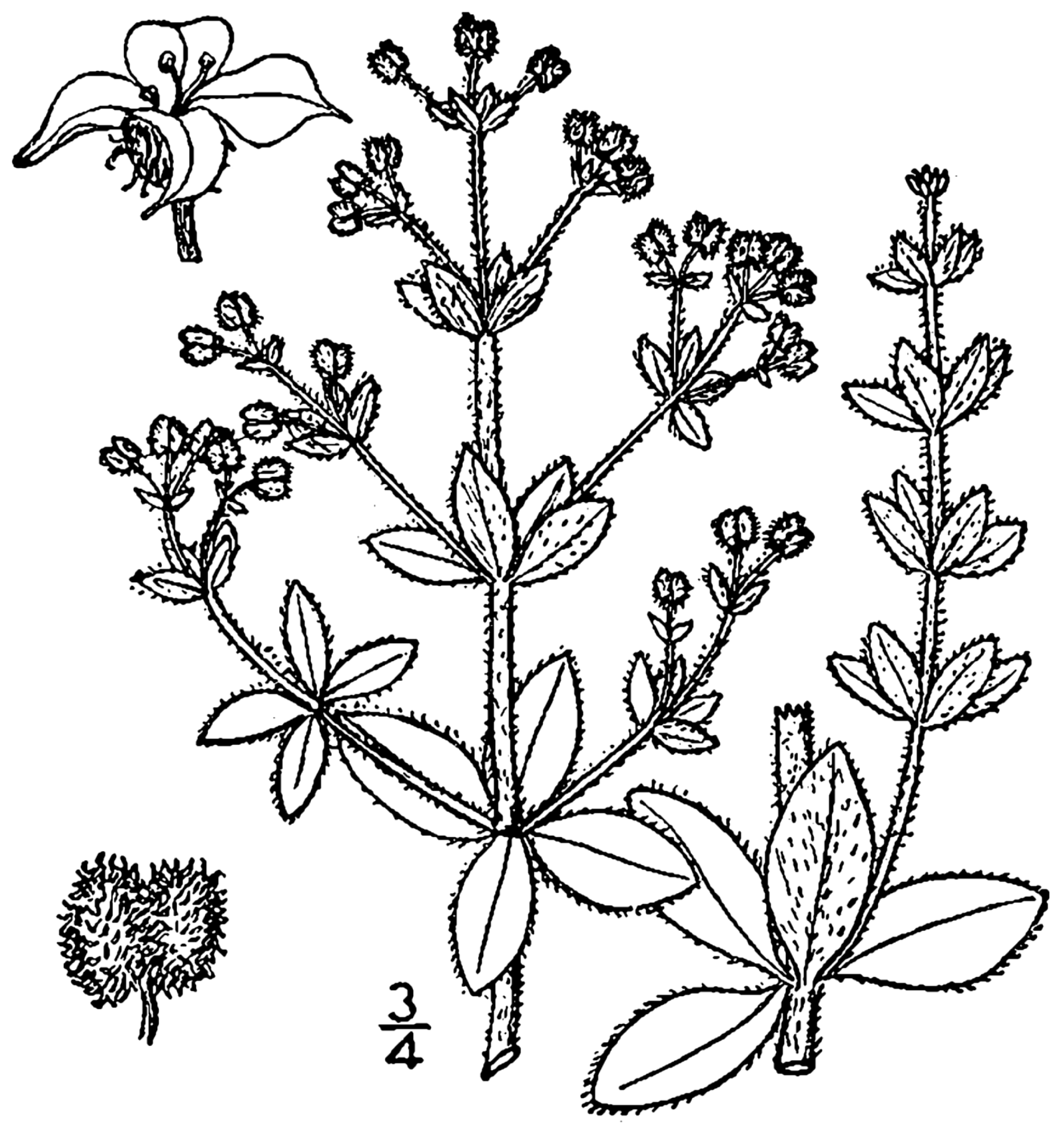

Scientific classification
- Kingdom: Plantae
- Clade: Tracheophytes
- Clade: Angiosperms
- Clade: Eudicots
- Clade: Asterids
- Order: Gentianales
- Family: Rubiaceae
- Genus: Galium
- Species: G. pilosum

Binomial name
- Galium pilosum Aiton

= Galium pilosum =

Hairy bedstraw

Species of plant

Galium pilosum, the hairy bedstraw, is a species of plants in the Rubiaceae. It is native to the southern and eastern United States and Canada from Texas to Florida north to Kansas, Michigan, Ontario, Quebec and New Hampshire. There are also isolated populations in Arizona, New Mexico, Colorado and Hispaniola. The plant is classified as a noxious weed in New York, Pennsylvania, Massachusetts and Connecticut.

G. pilosum may reach between 3 and 8 decimeters (approximately 11.8 to 31.5 inches) in height. Leaves have a whorled arrangement and range in length between 1 and 2.5 centimeters long and 6 to 12 millimeters wide. Flowers are greenish, white, or maroon.

It has been observed in habitats such as longleaf pine savannas, wet flatwoods, and in cabbage palm hammocks.
