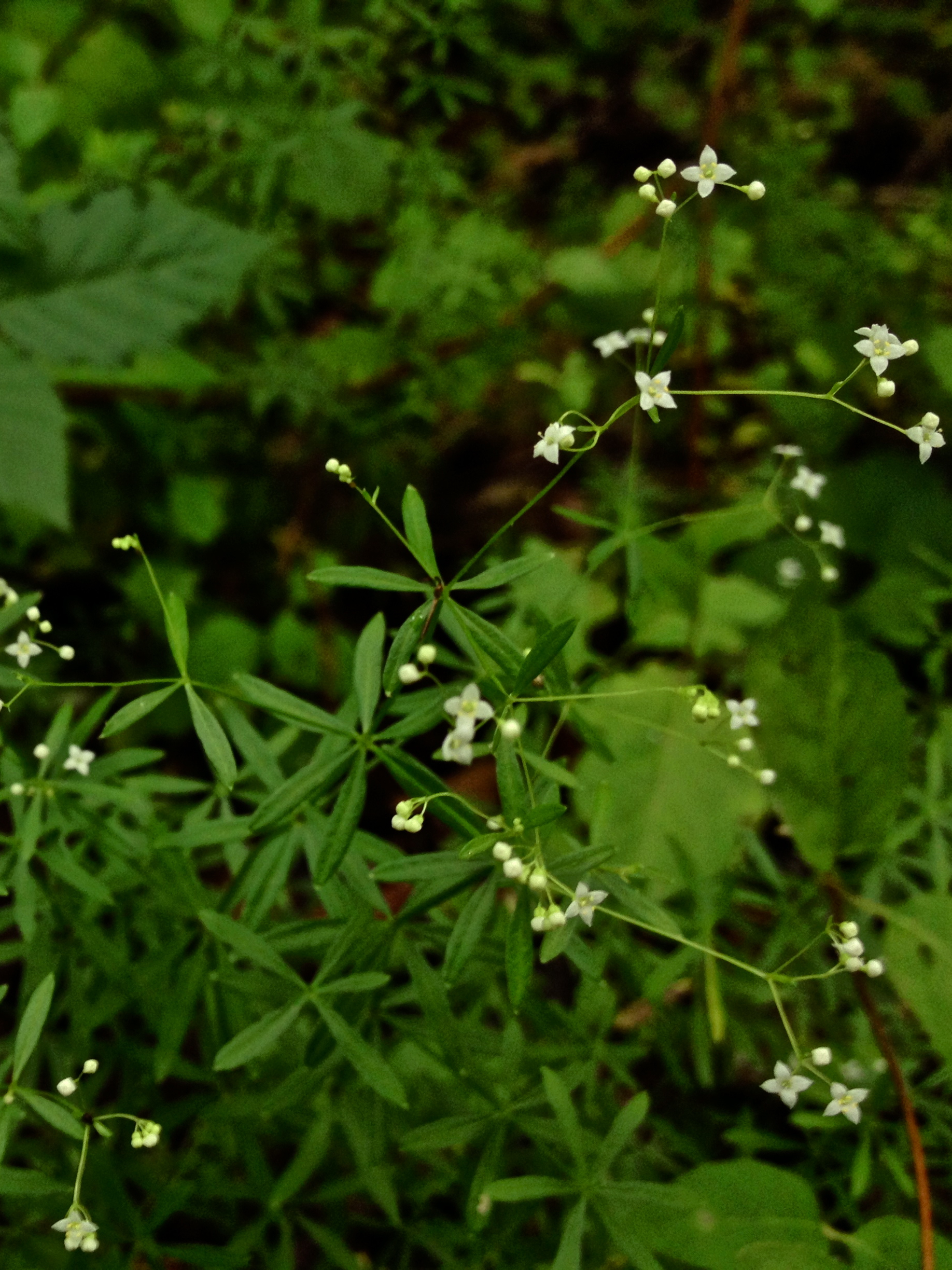

Scientific classification
- Kingdom: Plantae
- Clade: Tracheophytes
- Clade: Angiosperms
- Clade: Eudicots
- Clade: Asterids
- Order: Gentianales
- Family: Rubiaceae
- Genus: Galium
- Species: G. concinnum

Binomial name
- Galium concinnum Torr. & A. Gray

= Galium concinnum =

Species of plant

Galium concinnum, known as the shining bedstraw, is a herbaceous perennial plant species in the Rubiaceae family. It is native to the Midwestern United States and central Canada, especially the Great Lakes Region and the Valleys of the Ohio, lower Missouri, and upper Mississippi Rivers. It is commonly found in deciduous forests and forest edges. It grows low to the ground in natural habitats. Although it is not an invasive species, it can be very weedy. It is typically not cultivated.

== Description ==
Galium concinnum is a herbaceous perennial plant that trails low to the ground and has a delicate appearance. The plant is short, ranging from 15 to 63 cm in height.The stems are thin and fragile, have nearly microscopic (0.05–0.1mm) hairs, and typically branch once at a node. The leaves are small, long, and slender typically 2-3mm wide and ~1–2 cm long. The leaves appear in groups of 6 as whorls surrounding each stem node. At some branching nodes there are only 4 leaves to a node. The inflorescences are compound cyme, branching 2–3 times. Flowers are usually at the terminal ends of the inflorescence branches and are small (2-3mm wide), white, and have 4 petals. The fruits are smooth, round, small (1-5-2.3mm) and come in pairs.

== Habitat ==
Galium concinnum is native to the Midwestern United States and the Canadian province of Ontario. It is found in a wide range of habitats including mesic soils near lakes, rivers, and woodland edges. It can also be found in deciduous upland forests, bluffs, and even sandy or rocky woodlands.

== Etymology ==
Galium means milk; it is Dioscorides’ name. Concinnum means 'well proportioned' or 'symmetrical'.

== History ==
There are not many short-term trends connected to Gallium concinnum because there have not been enough populations researched to have good findings. There are three historical locations where it can be found, but one of these locations has been destroyed completely. There are also some long-term trends. For example, it has been common to New York for four decades, but there is little information on its condition, size, and threats.

== Uses ==
Galium concinnum (shinning bedstraw) was mostly used for stuffing beds. It was also a treatment for skin conditions. It was ground up into a powder to help inflammation and speed up the healing process of skin wounds. It also helps urinary tract problems. It does this by helping clean out the urinary tract.
