= Rubus ortivus =

Scientific classification
- Kingdom: Plantae
- Clade: Tracheophytes
- Clade: Angiosperms
- Clade: Eudicots
- Clade: Rosids
- Order: Rosales
- Family: Rosaceae
- Genus: Rubus
- Species: R. ortivus

Binomial name
- Rubus ortivus (L.H.Bailey) L.H.Bailey 1944

Synonyms
- Rubus semisetosus var. ortivus L.H. Bailey 1934; Rubus perinvisus L.H.Bailey; Rubus vermontanus var. ortivus (L.H.Bailey) B.Boivin

Species of fruit and plant

Rubus ortivus is uncommon North American species of brambles in the rose family. It grows in the northeastern United States (Maine) and eastern Canada (Nova Scotia, New Brunswick).

The genetics of Rubus is extremely complex, so that it is difficult to decide on which groups should be recognized as species. There are many rare species with limited ranges such as this. Further study is suggested to clarify the taxonomy.
