= Rubus uvidus =

Scientific classification
- Kingdom: Plantae
- Clade: Tracheophytes
- Clade: Angiosperms
- Clade: Eudicots
- Clade: Rosids
- Order: Rosales
- Family: Rosaceae
- Genus: Rubus
- Species: R. uvidus

Binomial name
- Rubus uvidus L.H.Bailey

Synonyms
- Rubus associus Hanes ex L.H.Bailey; Rubus humilior L.H.Bailey; Rubus licens L.H.Bailey; Rubus localis L.H.Bailey

Species of fruit and plant

Rubus uvidus is a North American species of brambles in the rose family. It grows in the province of Québec in eastern Canada, as well as in the northeastern and north-central United States (New York, Michigan, Pennsylvania, Ohio, and Wisconsin).

The genetics of Rubus is extremely complex, so that it is difficult to decide on which groups should be recognized as species. There are many rare species with limited ranges such as this. Further study is suggested to clarify the taxonomy.
