= Rubus pugnax =

Scientific classification
- Kingdom: Plantae
- Clade: Tracheophytes
- Clade: Angiosperms
- Clade: Eudicots
- Clade: Rosids
- Order: Rosales
- Family: Rosaceae
- Genus: Rubus
- Species: R. pugnax

Binomial name
- Rubus pugnax L.H.Bailey

Synonyms
- Rubus allegheniensis var. neoscoticus (Fernald) L.H.Bailey; Rubus glandicaulis var. neoscoticus Fernald

Species of fruit and plant

Rubus pugnax is a North American species of highbush blackberry in section Alleghenienses of the genus Rubus, a member of the rose family. It is found in eastern and central Canada (Québec, Ontario, New Brunswick, Nova Scotia) and in the eastern United States (Maine, Vermont, Massachusetts, New York, Pennsylvania, North Carolina, West Virginia).
