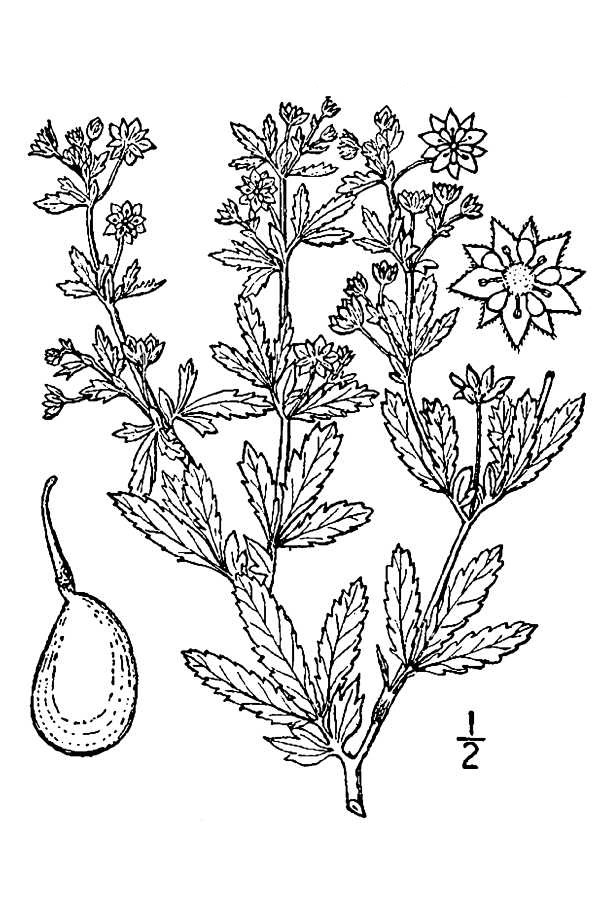

Scientific classification
- Kingdom: Plantae
- Clade: Tracheophytes
- Clade: Angiosperms
- Clade: Eudicots
- Clade: Rosids
- Order: Rosales
- Family: Rosaceae
- Genus: Potentilla
- Species: P. rivalis

Binomial name
- Potentilla rivalis Nutt.

Synonyms
- Potentilla leucocarpa Potentilla millegrana Potentilla pentandra

= Potentilla rivalis =

Species of aquatic plant

Potentilla rivalis is a species of cinquefoil known by the common names brook cinquefoil and river cinquefoil. It is native to much of North America, including the southern half of Canada and the western and central United States. It grows in moist habitat, sometimes in disturbed areas. It is an annual or biennial herb producing upright stems up to half a meter tall from a taproot. The hairy leaves are divided into three to five leaflets which are lance-shaped to oval and lined with teeth. The inflorescence is a cluster of several flowers with tiny yellow petals no more than 2 millimeters long on a calyx of pointed sepals and bractlets which are slightly longer.
