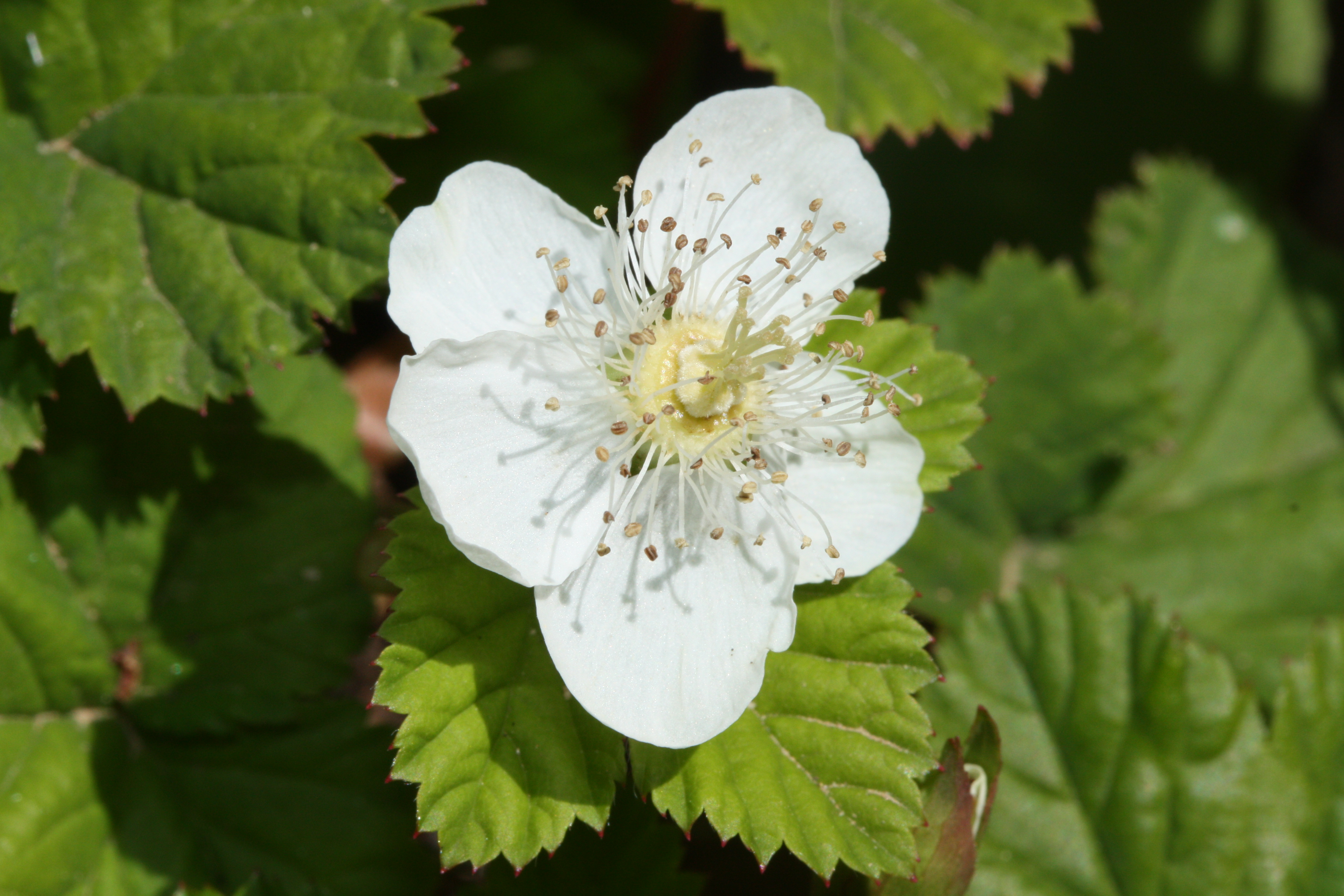

Scientific classification
- Kingdom: Plantae
- Clade: Embryophytes
- Clade: Tracheophytes
- Clade: Spermatophytes
- Clade: Angiosperms
- Clade: Eudicots
- Clade: Rosids
- Order: Rosales
- Family: Rosaceae
- Genus: Rubus
- Species: R. lasiococcus

Binomial name
- Rubus lasiococcus A.Gray 1882

Synonyms
- Comarobatia lasiococca (A.Gray) Greene

= Rubus lasiococcus =

Species of flowering plant

Rubus lasiococcus is a North American species of wild blackberry known by the common names roughfruit berry and dwarf bramble.

== Description ==
Rubus lasiococcus is a tangling, prostrate shrub with very slender stolons spreading along the ground and rooting where their nodes come in contact with moist substrate, forming a mat. Some stems grow erect to bear flowers. The leaves are 2.5–6.5 centimetres (1–2 1/2 in) wide, each deeply divided into three lobes, or compound into three toothed leaflets, borne on a petiole a few centimetres long.

The inflorescence is a solitary flower or a pair of flowers with five reflexed sepals and five white petals each up to 1 cm (3/8 in) long. The fruit is a densely hairy red aggregate about 1.3 cm (1/2 in) across.

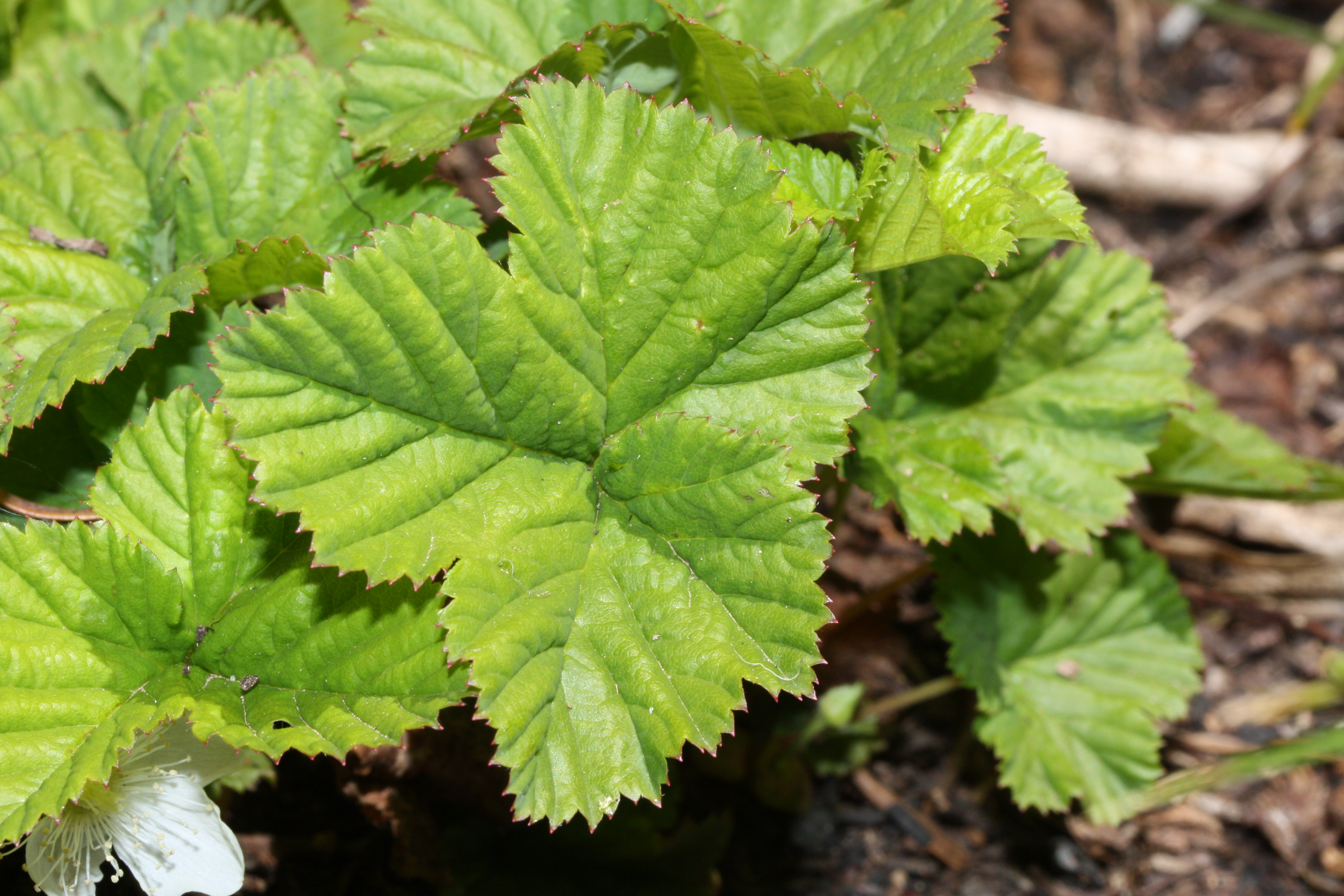
Leaves

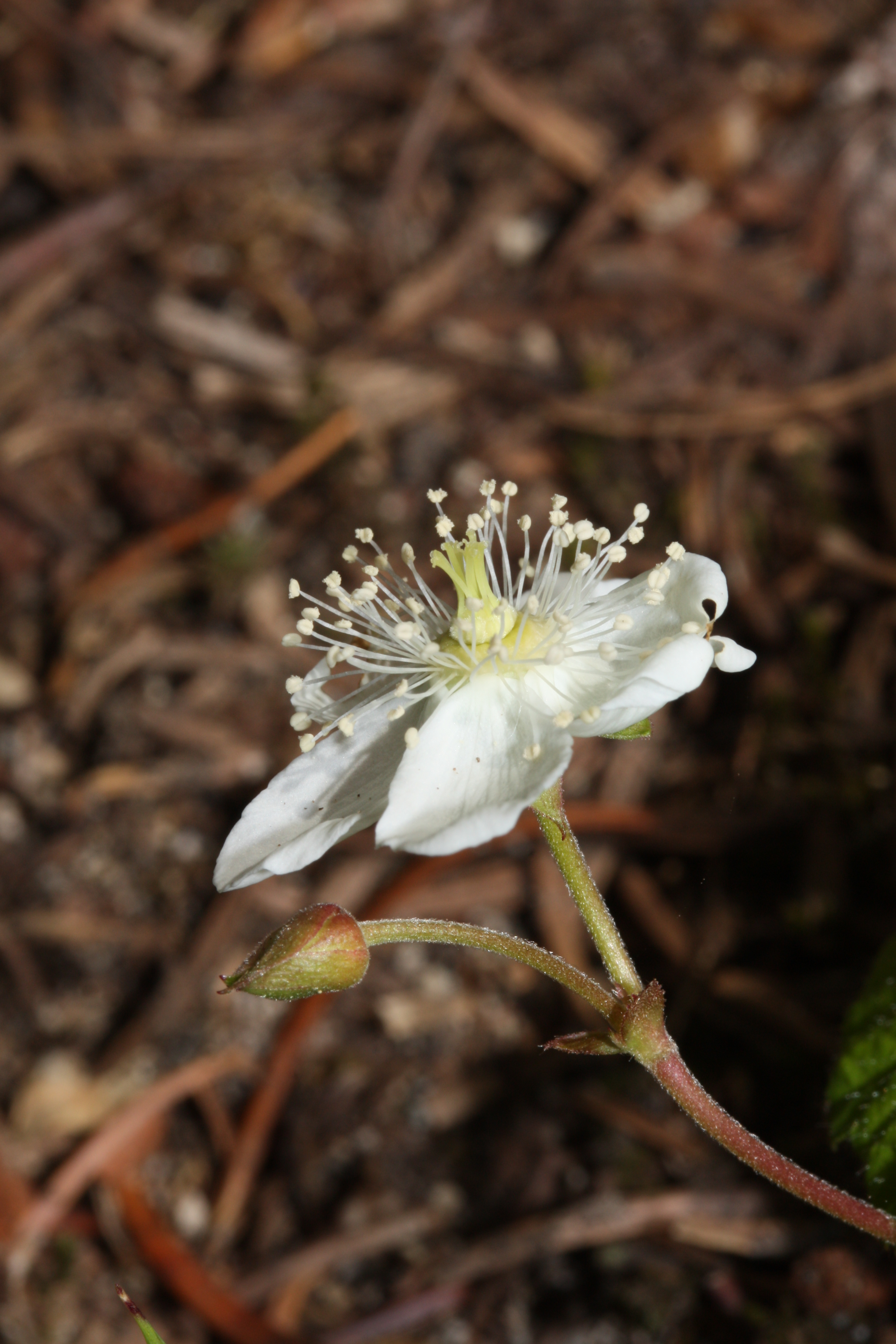
Flower side view

== Distribution and habitat ==
It is native to western North America from British Columbia to northern California, where it grows in mountain forests. In the southern half of its range the plant is commonly found in a plant community in the understory of mountain hemlock (Tsuga mertensiana) and Shasta red fir (Abies magnifica var. shastensis).

== Uses ==
The berry is edible.
