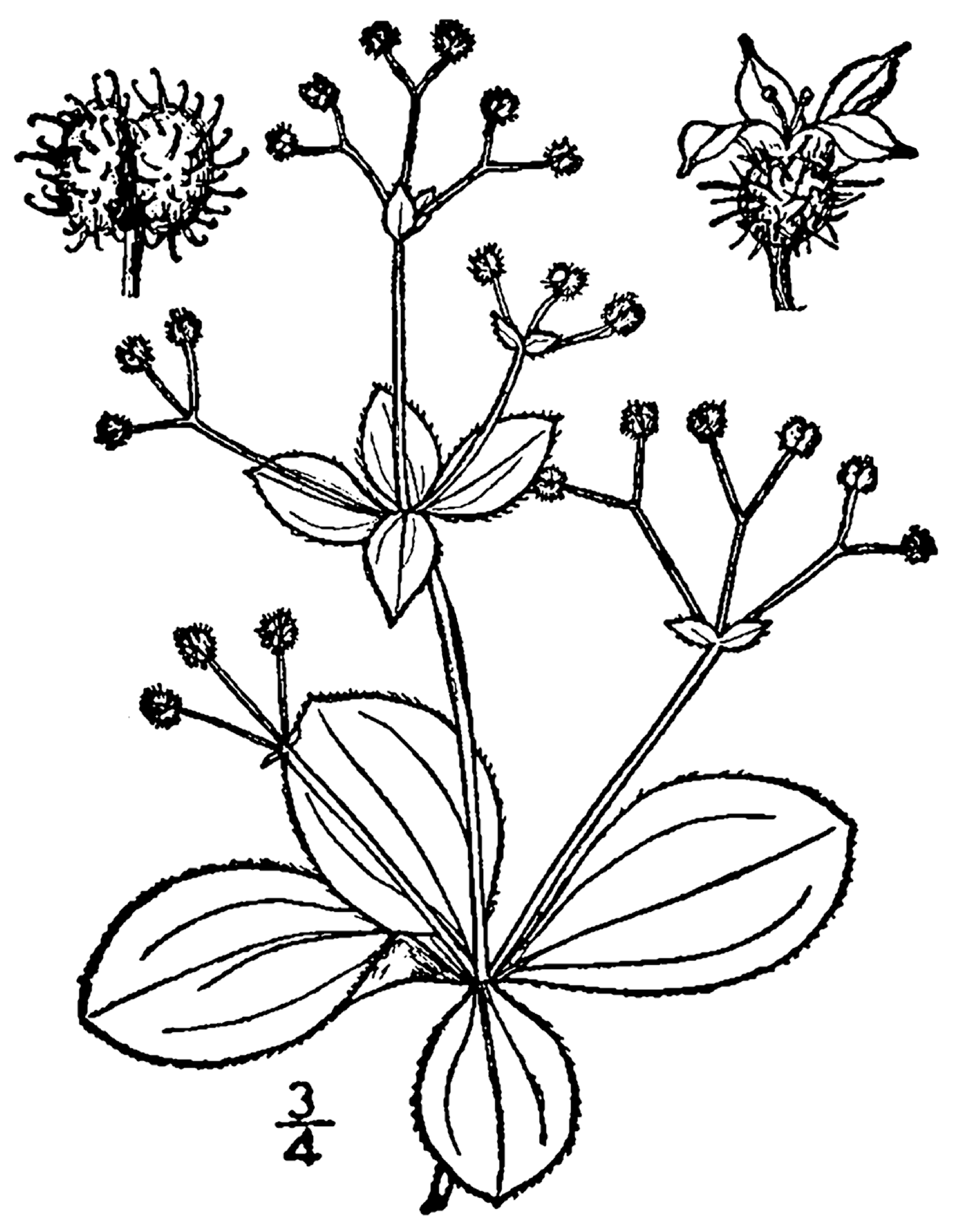

Scientific classification
- Kingdom: Plantae
- Clade: Tracheophytes
- Clade: Angiosperms
- Clade: Eudicots
- Clade: Asterids
- Order: Gentianales
- Family: Rubiaceae
- Genus: Galium
- Species: G. kamtschaticum

Binomial name
- Galium kamtschaticum Steller ex Schult. & Schult.f.,

= Galium kamtschaticum =

Species of plant

Galium kamtschaticum, known as Kamchatka bedstraw or boreal bedstraw, is a plant species in the Rubiaceae, named for the Kamchatka Peninsula on the Pacific Coast of Russia. The species is native to northeastern Asia and northern North America: Russia (Kamchatka, Sakhalin Island, and Kuril Islands), northeastern China (Heilongjiang, Jilin), Korea, Japan, Alaska (including the Aleutians), Canada (Yukon, Northwest Territories, British Columbia, Quebec, Ontario, Newfoundland, Nova Scotia, New Brunswick), and the northern part of the contiguous United States (Maine, New Hampshire, Vermont, New York, Michigan, Washington).

== Varieties ==
Two varieties are recognized:

- Galium kamtschaticum var. kamtschaticum - most of species range
- Galium kamtschaticum var. yakusimense (Masam.) T.Yamaz - indigenous to Yakushima Island in southern Japan
