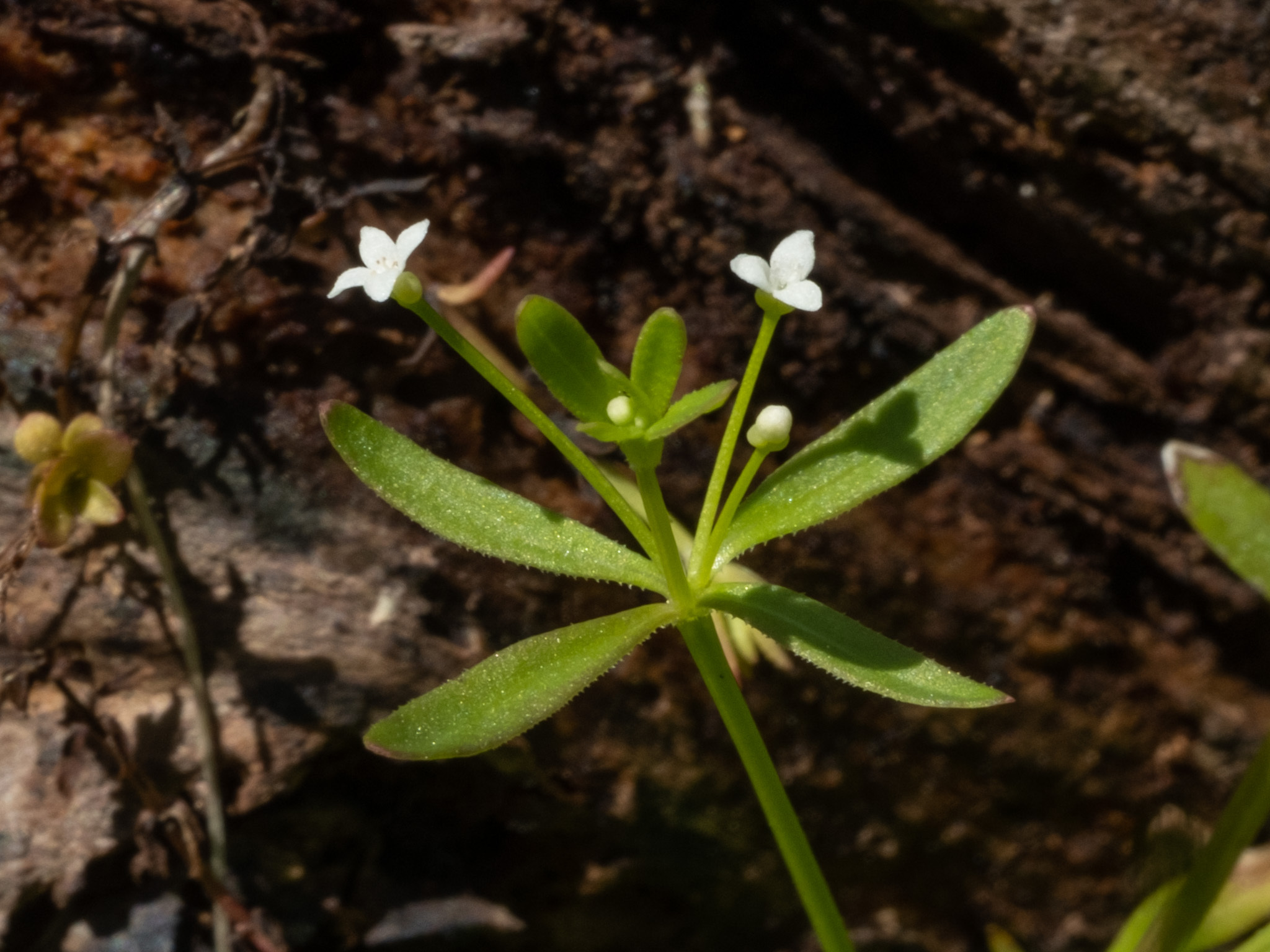

Scientific classification
- Kingdom: Plantae
- Clade: Tracheophytes
- Clade: Angiosperms
- Clade: Eudicots
- Clade: Asterids
- Order: Gentianales
- Family: Rubiaceae
- Genus: Galium
- Species: G. tinctorium

Binomial name
- Galium tinctorium L.

= Galium tinctorium =

Species of plant

Galium tinctorium, the stiff marsh bedstraw, is a species of plants in the Rubiaceae. It is widespread and common across the eastern part of North America, from Texas to Labrador and from Minnesota to Florida, plus eastern and central Mexico and the Dominican Republic. It is classed as a noxious weed in some parts of the northeastern United States.

Galium tinctorium is a reclining herb with whorls of narrowly lanceolate leaves. Flowers have 3 petals each instead of the usual 4 more common in the genus. Petals are white in color with tips that are pointed or blunt. It grows in woods, wet ditches, and along shores.
