= Rubus novocaesarius =

Scientific classification
- Kingdom: Plantae
- Clade: Tracheophytes
- Clade: Angiosperms
- Clade: Eudicots
- Clade: Rosids
- Order: Rosales
- Family: Rosaceae
- Genus: Rubus
- Species: R. novocaesarius

Binomial name
- Rubus novocaesarius L.H.Bailey 1941

Species of fruit and plant

Rubus novocaesarius is a rare North American species of brambles in the rose family. It has been found in the State of New Jersey in the northeastern United States.

The genetics of Rubus is extremely complex, so that it is difficult to decide on which groups should be recognized as species. There are many rare species with limited ranges such as this. Further study is suggested to clarify the taxonomy.
