= Rubus semisetosus =

Scientific classification
- Kingdom: Plantae
- Clade: Tracheophytes
- Clade: Angiosperms
- Clade: Eudicots
- Clade: Rosids
- Order: Rosales
- Family: Rosaceae
- Genus: Rubus
- Species: R. semisetosus

Binomial name
- Rubus semisetosus Blanch. 1907

Synonyms
- Rubus benneri L.H.Bailey

Species of fruit and plant

Rubus semisetosus is a North American species of bristleberry in section Setosi of the genus Rubus, a member of the rose family. It grows in the Canadian Province of Nova Scotia as well as in the northeastern and north-central United States from New England to Minnesota.
