= Rubus regionalis =

Scientific classification
- Kingdom: Plantae
- Clade: Tracheophytes
- Clade: Angiosperms
- Clade: Eudicots
- Clade: Rosids
- Order: Rosales
- Family: Rosaceae
- Genus: Rubus
- Species: R. regionalis

Binomial name
- Rubus regionalis (L.H.Bailey) L.H.Bailey

Synonyms
- Rubus junceus var. regionalis L.H. Bailey 1932; Rubus viridifrons L.H.Bailey 1947

Species of fruit and plant

Rubus regionalis is a North American species of bristleberry in the genus Rubus, a member of the rose family. It is native to the Upper Great Lakes region of the United States and adjacent Canada.
