= Rubus aculifer =

Scientific classification
- Kingdom: Plantae
- Clade: Tracheophytes
- Clade: Angiosperms
- Clade: Eudicots
- Clade: Rosids
- Order: Rosales
- Family: Rosaceae
- Genus: Rubus
- Species: R. aculifer

Binomial name
- Rubus aculifer Fernald 1940

Synonyms
- Rubus aculiferus Fernald, alternate spelling

Species of flowering plant

Rubus aculifer, the thorny dewberry, is a rare North American species of flowering plant in the rose family.

It has been found only in the state of New Hampshire in the northeastern United States.

The genetics of Rubus is extremely complex, so that it is difficult to decide on which groups should be recognized as species. There are many rare species with limited ranges such as this. Further study is suggested to clarify the taxonomy. Some studies have suggested that R. aculifer may have originated as a hybrid between R. allegheniensis and R. setosus.
