= Rubus harmonicus =

Scientific classification
- Kingdom: Plantae
- Clade: Tracheophytes
- Clade: Angiosperms
- Clade: Eudicots
- Clade: Rosids
- Order: Rosales
- Family: Rosaceae
- Genus: Rubus
- Species: R. harmonicus

Binomial name
- Rubus harmonicus Fernald 1940

Species of fruit and plant

Rubus harmonicus is a rare North American species of flowering plant in the rose family. It is native to the eastern United States (Maine, West Virginia).

The genetics of Rubus is extremely complex, so that it is difficult to decide on which groups should be recognized as species. There are many rare species with limited ranges such as this. Further study is suggested to clarify the taxonomy. Some studies have suggested that R. harmonicus may have originated as a hybrid between R. setosus and R. hispidus.
