= Rubus tholiformis =

Scientific classification
- Kingdom: Plantae
- Clade: Tracheophytes
- Clade: Angiosperms
- Clade: Eudicots
- Clade: Rosids
- Order: Rosales
- Family: Rosaceae
- Genus: Rubus
- Species: R. tholiformis

Binomial name
- Rubus tholiformis Fernald

Synonyms
- Rubus spiculosus Fernald

Species of fruit and plant

Rubus tholiformis is a rare North American species of flowering plant in the rose family. It has been found only in eastern Canada (Québec and Nova Scotia) and the northeastern United States (Maine, New Hampshire, Vermont).

The genetics of Rubus is extremely complex, so that it is difficult to decide on which groups should be recognized as species. There are many rare species with limited ranges such as this. Further study is suggested to clarify the taxonomy. Some studies have suggested that R. tholiformis may have originated as a hybrid between R. setosus and R. hispidus.
