= Rubus hypolasius =

Scientific classification
- Kingdom: Plantae
- Clade: Tracheophytes
- Clade: Angiosperms
- Clade: Eudicots
- Clade: Rosids
- Order: Rosales
- Family: Rosaceae
- Genus: Rubus
- Species: R. hypolasius

Binomial name
- Rubus hypolasius Fernald 1947

Species of fruit and plant

Rubus hypolasius is an uncommon North American species of flowering plant in the rose family. It grows in the east-central United States (New Jersey, Virginia).

The genetics of Rubus is extremely complex, so that it is difficult to decide on which groups should be recognized as species. There are many rare species with limited ranges such as this. Further study is suggested to clarify the taxonomy. Some studies have suggested that R. hypolasius may have originated as a hybrid between R. flagellaris and R. pensilvanicus.
