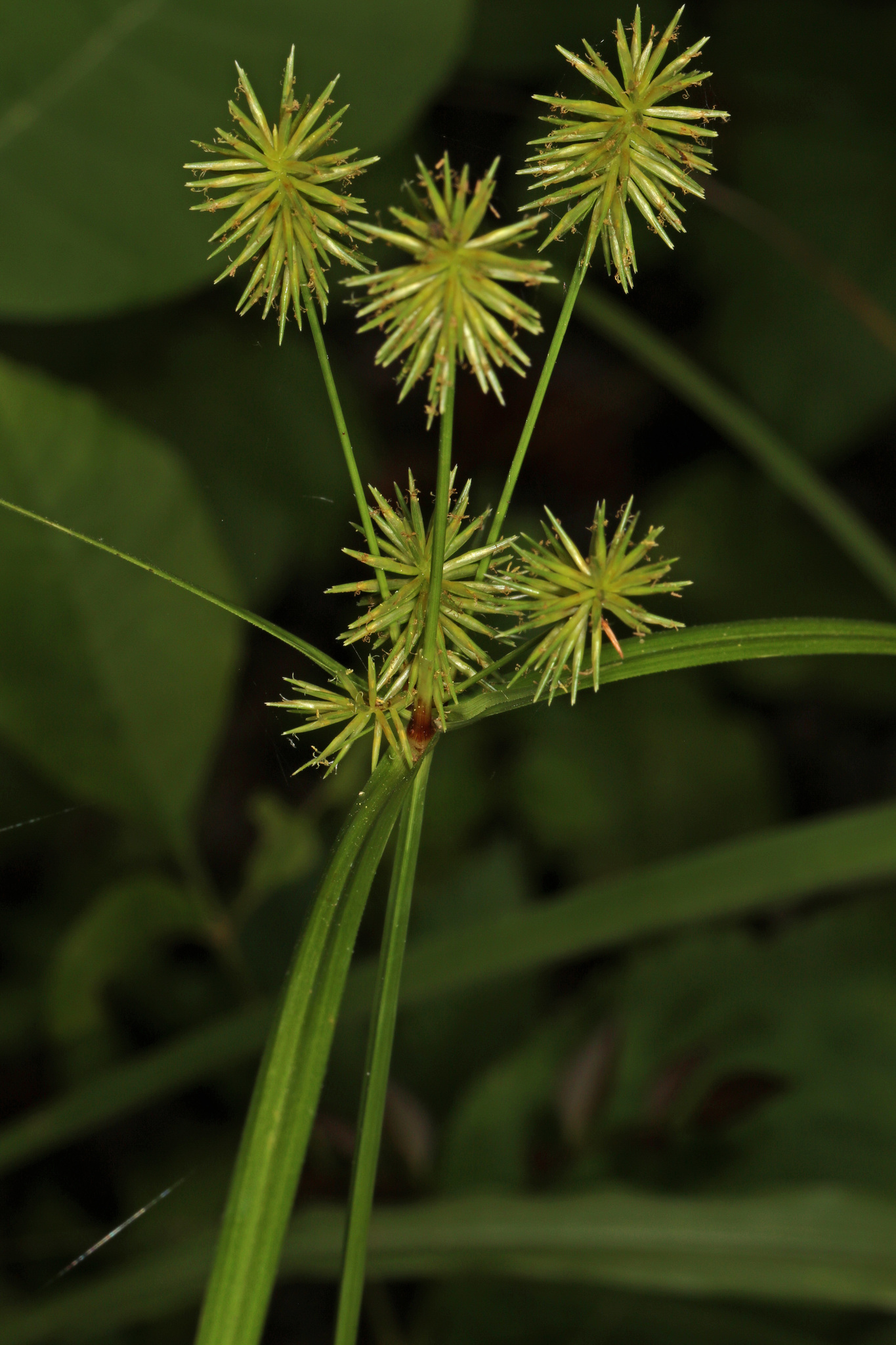

Conservation status
- Secure (NatureServe)

Scientific classification
- Kingdom: Plantae
- Clade: Embryophytes
- Clade: Tracheophytes
- Clade: Spermatophytes
- Clade: Angiosperms
- Clade: Monocots
- Clade: Commelinids
- Order: Poales
- Family: Cyperaceae
- Genus: Cyperus
- Species: C. lancastriensis

Binomial name
- Cyperus lancastriensis Porter, 1867

= Cyperus lancastriensis =

Species of sedge

Cyperus lancastriensis, commonly known as manyflower flatsedge is a species of sedge that is native to eastern parts of the United States, primarily in the coastal plain and Piedmont. Cyperus lancastriensis has a tall growth form with a radiating cluster of spreading flower stalks at the apex of its stem. It inhabits dry to mesic woodlands, clearings, fields, roadsides, mafic and granitic outcrops, and riverside prairies. It is similar to Cyperus hystricinus and Cyperus refractus, with Cyperus hystricinus having more broadly elliptical spikes and Cyperus refractus having denser spikes and shorter scales compared to Cyperus lancastriensis.

== See also ==
- List of Cyperus species
