= Rubus rossbergianus =

Scientific classification
- Kingdom: Plantae
- Clade: Tracheophytes
- Clade: Angiosperms
- Clade: Eudicots
- Clade: Rosids
- Order: Rosales
- Family: Rosaceae
- Genus: Rubus
- Species: R. rossbergianus

Binomial name
- Rubus rossbergianus Blanch. 1907

Species of fruit and plant

Rubus rossbergianus is an uncommon North American species of flowering plant in the rose family. It grows in the northeastern United States (Connecticut, Rhode Island, Massachusetts, and Vermont).

The genetics of Rubus are extremely complex, so it is difficult to decide which groups should be recognized as species. There are many rare species with limited ranges such as this. Further study is suggested to clarify the taxonomy. Some studies have suggested that R. rossbergianus may have originated as a hybrid between R. flagellaris and R. pensilvanicus.
