= Rubus immanis =

Scientific classification
- Kingdom: Plantae
- Clade: Tracheophytes
- Clade: Angiosperms
- Clade: Eudicots
- Clade: Rosids
- Order: Rosales
- Family: Rosaceae
- Genus: Rubus
- Species: R. immanis

Binomial name
- Rubus immanis Ashe 1903

Species of fruit and plant

Rubus immanis is a rare North American species of flowering plant in the rose family. It has been found only in the state of North Carolina in the eastern United States.

The genetics of Rubus is extremely complex, so that it is difficult to decide on which groups should be recognized as species. There are many rare species with limited ranges such as this. Further study is suggested to clarify the taxonomy. Some studies have suggested that R. immanis may have originated as a hybrid between R. allegheniensis and R. canadensis.
