= Rubus furtivus =

Scientific classification
- Kingdom: Plantae
- Clade: Tracheophytes
- Clade: Angiosperms
- Clade: Eudicots
- Clade: Rosids
- Order: Rosales
- Family: Rosaceae
- Genus: Rubus
- Species: R. furtivus

Binomial name
- Rubus furtivus L.H.Bailey 1947

Species of fruit and plant

Rubus furtivus is an uncommon North American species of flowering plant in the rose family. It grows in northeastern United States, having been found only in the state of New York.

The genetics of Rubus is extremely complex, so that it is difficult to decide on which groups should be recognized as species. There are many rare species with limited ranges such as this. Further study is suggested to clarify the taxonomy. Some studies have suggested that R. furtivus may have originated as a hybrid between R. flagellaris and R. hispidus.
