= Rubus noveboracus =

Scientific classification
- Kingdom: Plantae
- Clade: Tracheophytes
- Clade: Angiosperms
- Clade: Eudicots
- Clade: Rosids
- Order: Rosales
- Family: Rosaceae
- Genus: Rubus
- Species: R. noveboracus

Binomial name
- Rubus noveboracus L.H.Bailey 1947

Species of fruit and plant

Rubus noveboracus is an uncommon North American species of flowering plant in the rose family. It grows in the northeastern and north-central United States (New York, Pennsylvania) and eastern Canada (Québec).

The genetics of Rubus is extremely complex, so that it is difficult to decide on which groups should be recognized as species. There are many rare species with limited ranges such as this. Further study is suggested to clarify the taxonomy. Some studies have suggested that R. noveboracus may have originated as a hybrid between R. allegheniensis and R. pensilvanicus.
