= Rubus parlinii =

Scientific classification
- Kingdom: Plantae
- Clade: Tracheophytes
- Clade: Angiosperms
- Clade: Eudicots
- Clade: Rosids
- Order: Rosales
- Family: Rosaceae
- Genus: Rubus
- Species: R. parlinii

Binomial name
- Rubus parlinii L.H.Bailey

Species of fruit and plant

Rubus parlinii is a rare North American species of flowering plant in the rose family. It is native to the northeastern United States (Maine, Vermont, Connecticut).

The genetics of Rubus is extremely complex, so that it is difficult to decide on which groups should be recognized as species. There are many rare species with limited ranges such as this. Further study is suggested to clarify the taxonomy. Some studies have suggested that R. parlinii may have originated as a hybrid between R. setosus and R. hispidus.
