= Rubus novanglicus =

Scientific classification
- Kingdom: Plantae
- Clade: Tracheophytes
- Clade: Angiosperms
- Clade: Eudicots
- Clade: Rosids
- Order: Rosales
- Family: Rosaceae
- Genus: Rubus
- Species: R. novanglicus

Binomial name
- Rubus novanglicus L.H.Bailey 1932

Species of fruit and plant

Rubus novanglicus is an uncommon North American species of flowering plant in the rose family. It grows in northeastern United States, having been found only in the State of Connecticut.

The name "novanglicus" means "New England", referring to the six-state region of which Connecticut is a part.

The genetics of Rubus is extremely complex, so that it is difficult to decide on which groups should be recognized as species. There are many rare species with limited ranges such as this. Further study is suggested to clarify the taxonomy. Some studies have suggested that R. novanglicus may have originated as a hybrid between R. hispidus and R. canadensis.
