= Rubus vigoratus =

Scientific classification
- Kingdom: Plantae
- Clade: Tracheophytes
- Clade: Angiosperms
- Clade: Eudicots
- Clade: Rosids
- Order: Rosales
- Family: Rosaceae
- Genus: Rubus
- Species: R. vigoratus

Binomial name
- Rubus vigoratus L.H.Bailey

Species of fruit and plant

Rubus vigoratus is an uncommon North American species of flowering plant in the rose family. It grows in Nova Scotia and Massachusetts. Nowhere is it very common.

The genetics of Rubus is extremely complex, so that it is difficult to decide on which groups should be recognized as species. There are many rare species with limited ranges such as this. Further study is suggested to clarify the taxonomy. Some studies have suggested that R. vigoratus may have originated as a hybrid between R. flagellaris and R. hispidus.
