= Rubus bigelovianus =

Scientific classification
- Kingdom: Plantae
- Clade: Tracheophytes
- Clade: Angiosperms
- Clade: Eudicots
- Clade: Rosids
- Order: Rosales
- Family: Rosaceae
- Genus: Rubus
- Species: R. bigelovianus

Binomial name
- Rubus bigelovianus L.H.Bailey 1934

Berry and plant

Rubus bigelovianus, the lowland blackberry, is a North American species of flowering plant in the rose family. It is native to the States of Massachusetts, Rhode Island, Connecticut, and New York in the northeastern United States.

The genetics of Rubus is extremely complex, so that it is difficult to decide on which groups should be recognized as species. There are many rare species with limited ranges such as this. Further study is suggested to clarify the taxonomy. Some studies have suggested that R. bigelovianus may have originated as a hybrid between R. setosus and R. flagellaris.
