= Rubus perspicuus =

Scientific classification
- Kingdom: Plantae
- Clade: Tracheophytes
- Clade: Angiosperms
- Clade: Eudicots
- Clade: Rosids
- Order: Rosales
- Family: Rosaceae
- Genus: Rubus
- Species: R. perspicuus

Binomial name
- Rubus perspicuus L.H.Bailey

Species of fruit and plant

Rubus perspicuus is a rare North American species of flowering plant in the rose family. It has been found only in Michigan and Wisconsin in the north-central United States.

The genetics of Rubus is extremely complex, so that it is difficult to decide on which groups should be recognized as species. There are many rare species with limited ranges such as this. Further study is suggested to clarify the taxonomy. Some studies have suggested that R. perspicuus may have originated as a hybrid between R. allegheniensis and R. setosus.
