= Rubus flavinanus =

Scientific classification
- Kingdom: Plantae
- Clade: Tracheophytes
- Clade: Angiosperms
- Clade: Eudicots
- Clade: Rosids
- Order: Rosales
- Family: Rosaceae
- Genus: Rubus
- Species: R. flavinanus

Binomial name
- Rubus flavinanus Blanch. 1906

Synonyms
- Rubus angustifoliatus L.H.Bailey

Species of fruit and plant

Rubus flavinanus is a rare North American species of flowering plant in the rose family. It has been found only in the eastern United States primarily in the Appalachian Mountains of eastern West Virginia and western Maryland, but with a few populations in southern Vermont.

The genetics of Rubus is extremely complex, so that it is difficult to decide on which groups should be recognized as species. There are many rare species with limited ranges such as this. Further study is suggested to clarify the taxonomy. Some studies have suggested that R. flavinanus may have originated as a hybrid between R. allegheniensis and R. setosus.
