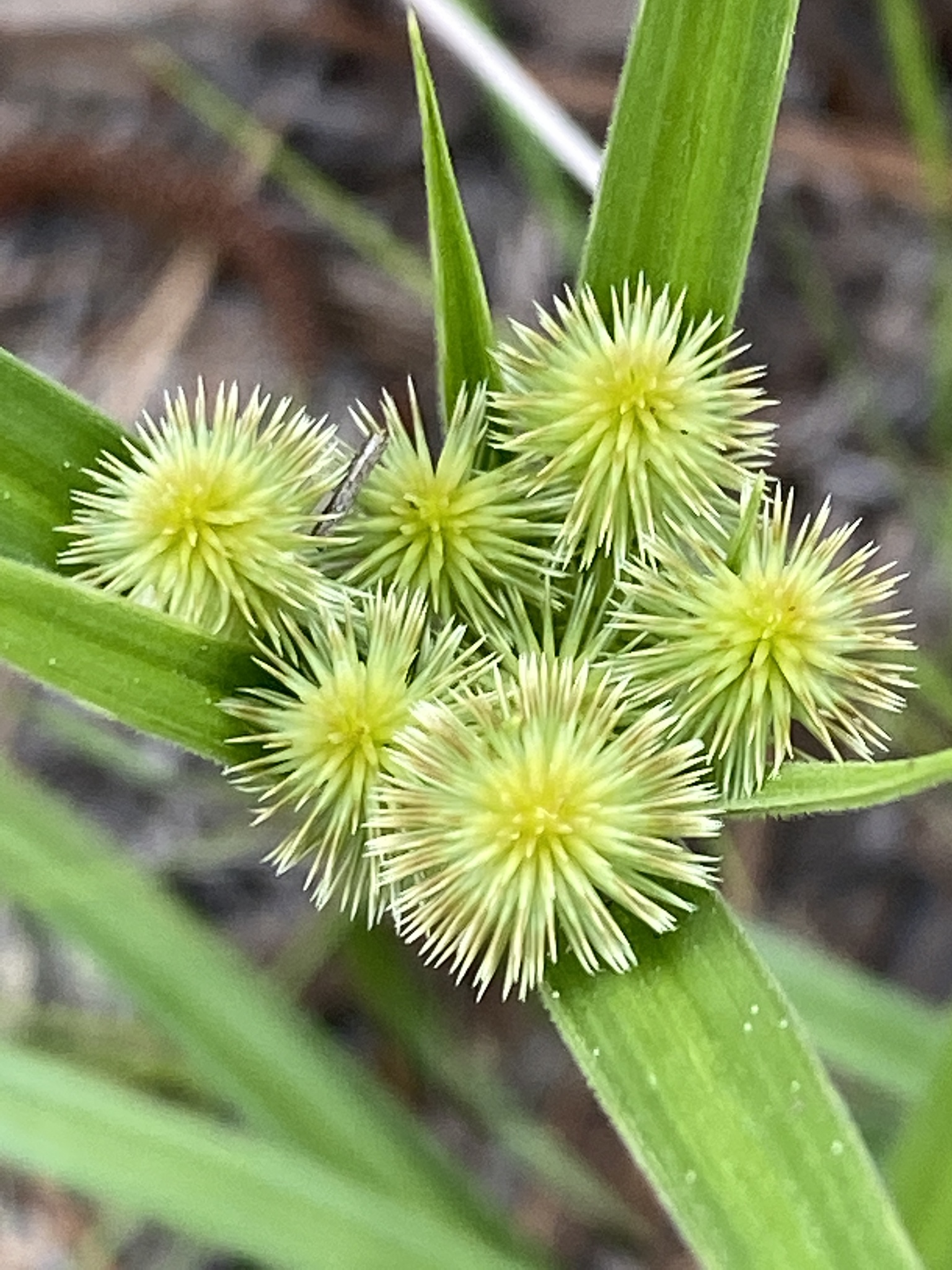
- In North Carolina

Conservation status
- Secure (NatureServe)

Scientific classification
- Kingdom: Plantae
- Clade: Embryophytes
- Clade: Tracheophytes
- Clade: Spermatophytes
- Clade: Angiosperms
- Clade: Monocots
- Clade: Commelinids
- Order: Poales
- Family: Cyperaceae
- Genus: Cyperus
- Species: C. plukenetii

Binomial name
- Cyperus plukenetii Fernald

= Cyperus plukenetii =

Species of sedge

Cyperus plukenetii is a species of perennial sedge that is native to south central and south eastern parts of United States.

This species requires sandy soil. It has been observed growing in habitats such as hardwood stands, upland pine communities, and scrub oak sandhills.

== See also ==
- List of Cyperus species
