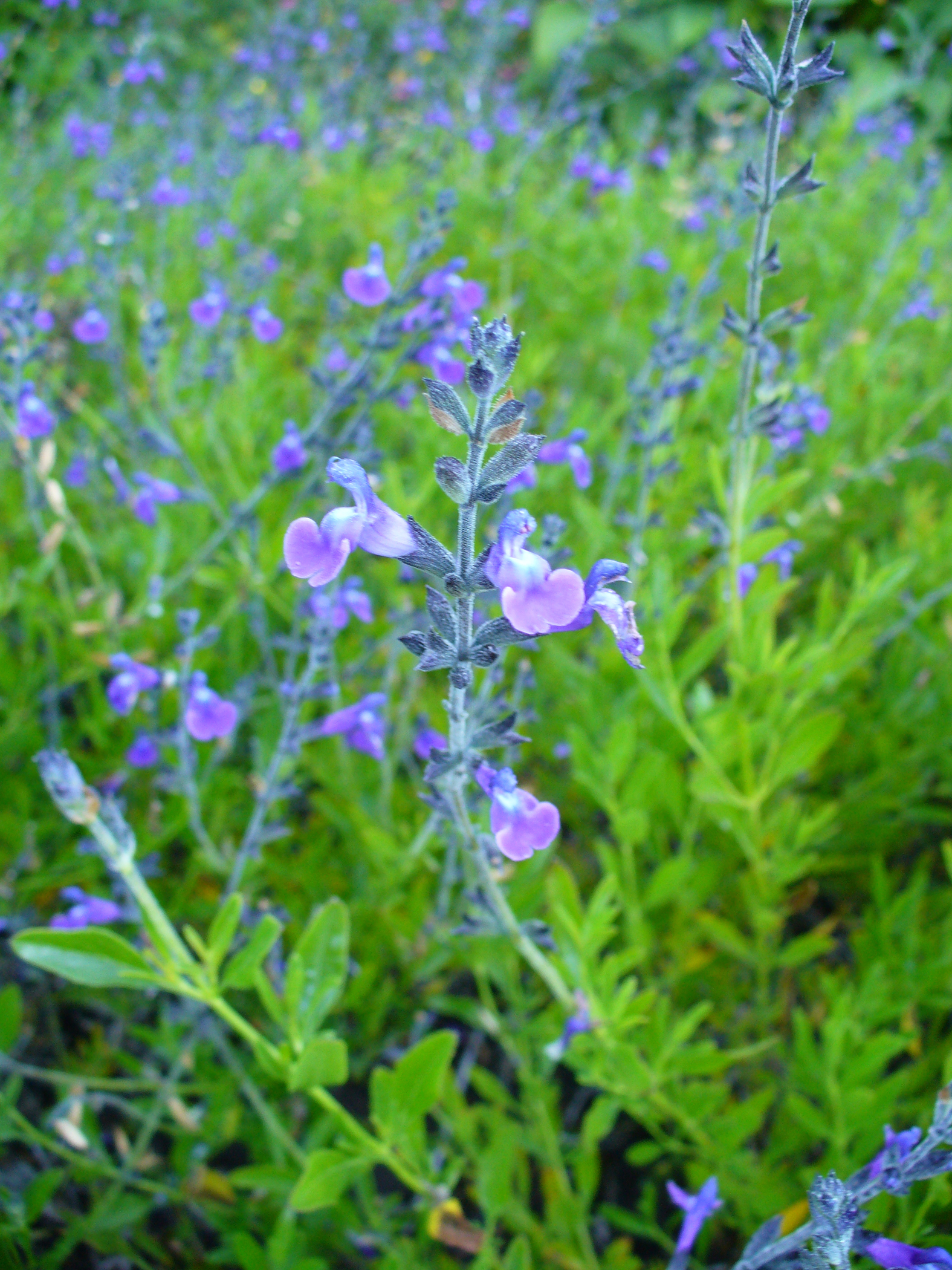

Scientific classification
- Kingdom: Plantae
- Clade: Tracheophytes
- Clade: Angiosperms
- Clade: Eudicots
- Clade: Asterids
- Order: Lamiales
- Family: Lamiaceae
- Genus: Salvia
- Species: S. coahuilensis

Binomial name
- Salvia coahuilensis Fernald

= Salvia coahuilensis =

Species of shrub

Salvia coahuilensis is a perennial shrub native to the Sierra Madre Oriental in the Mexican state of Coahuila. It is a low-growing evergreen, under 2.5 ft in height and width, with many woody branches growing from the base. It has 1 in long beet-purple flowers, and 1 in long widely spaced, linear olive-green leaves.
