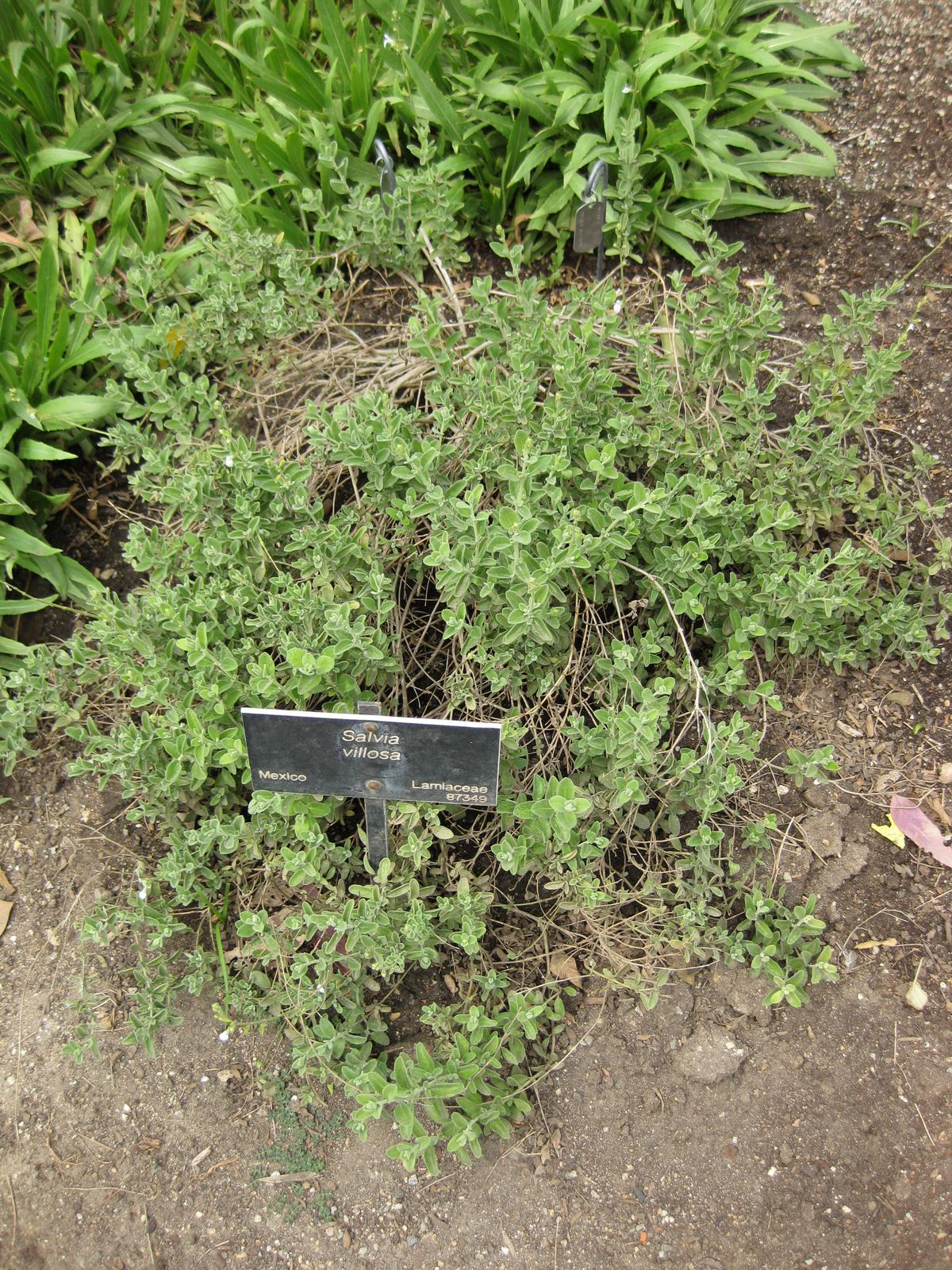

Scientific classification
- Kingdom: Plantae
- Clade: Tracheophytes
- Clade: Angiosperms
- Clade: Eudicots
- Clade: Asterids
- Order: Lamiales
- Family: Lamiaceae
- Genus: Salvia
- Species: S. villosa

Binomial name
- Salvia villosa Fernald

= Salvia villosa =

Species of flowering plant

Salvia villosa is a herbaceous perennial that is native to the Mexican states of San Luis Potosi and Coahuila, growing at approximately 4,000 feet (1,200 m) elevation in dry areas that have little or no frost.

Salvia villosa is a low mounding plant with a dainty appearance that eventually reaches 1 to 1.5 feet (0.30 to 0.46 m) tall and wide. Blue-green leaves grow up to 1 inch (2.5 cm) long, growing upright on the stems and covering the plant. The leaves and their margins are covered with short hairs, giving the plant its specific epithet, villosa, or "hairy". The inflorescences are 8 inches (20 cm) long, thin and wiry, with verticils that have two to six bright violet-blue flowers. The flowers are very small, less than 0.5 inches (1.3 cm) long, with a white beeline on the lower lip that leads into the throat. It never blooms profusely, but consistently puts out a few flowers from spring to autumn.
