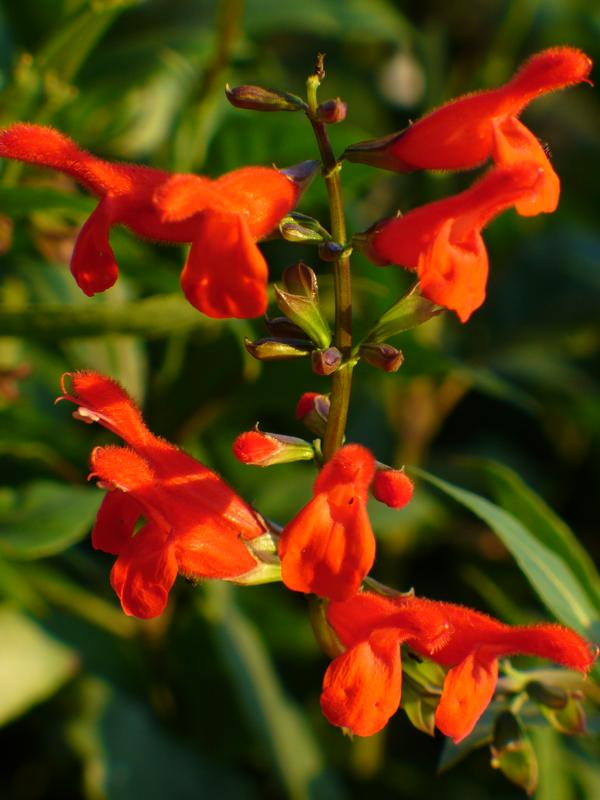

Scientific classification
- Kingdom: Plantae
- Clade: Tracheophytes
- Clade: Angiosperms
- Clade: Eudicots
- Clade: Asterids
- Order: Lamiales
- Family: Lamiaceae
- Genus: Salvia
- Species: S. miniata

Binomial name
- Salvia miniata Fernald

= Salvia miniata =

Species of shrub

Salvia miniata, the Belize sage, is a woody-based herbaceous perennial plant from Belize and the Mexican state of Chiapas. It typically grows on shaded mountain hillsides at 600 m (2,000 ft) elevation. The single flowers are clear red, with an orange undertone, about 2.5 cm long. The flowers grow in whorls on inflorescences up to 30 cm long. Salvia miniata reaches about 1 m (3.3 ft) in height and width during the summer growing season, with many branches from the base, and myrtle-green glossy leaves measuring about 13 cm long and 5 cm wide.
