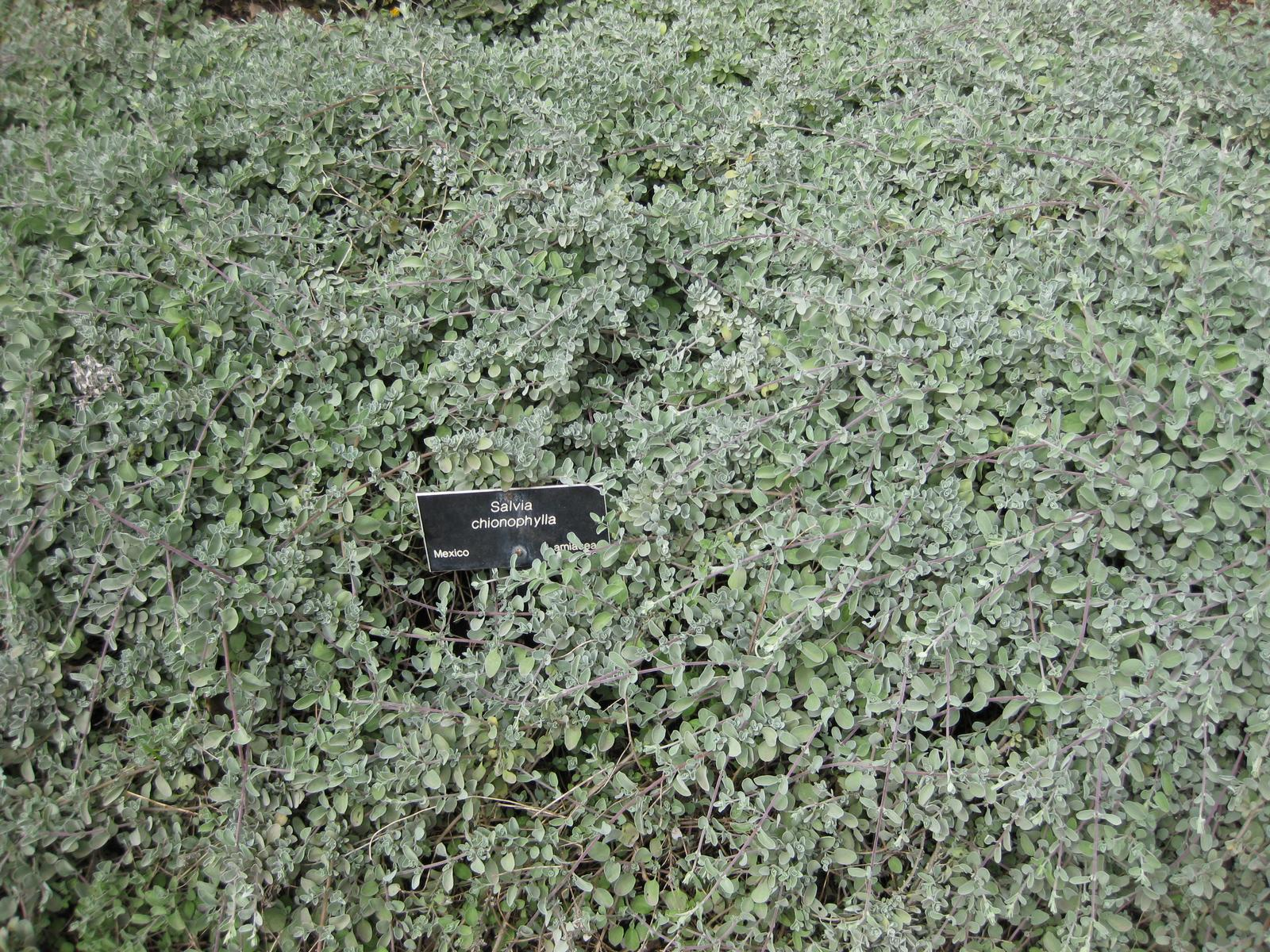

Scientific classification
- Kingdom: Plantae
- Clade: Tracheophytes
- Clade: Angiosperms
- Clade: Eudicots
- Clade: Asterids
- Order: Lamiales
- Family: Lamiaceae
- Genus: Salvia
- Species: S. chionophylla

Binomial name
- Salvia chionophylla Fernald

= Salvia chionophylla =

Species of flowering plant

Salvia chionophylla is a low-growing evergreen perennial plant native to a small area in the state of Coahuila, Mexico. First described in 1907 by Merritt Lyndon Fernald, it was only seen in horticulture beginning around 1996. It is a trailing plant that spreads by rooting at its nodes, producing more trailing stems, with small rounded dove-gray leaves about 0.5 inches (13 mm) long, evenly spaced along the stem. The small blue flowers are less than .25 inches (6.4 mm) long on short inflorescences with whorls of 2–6 flowers.
