= Rubus paludivagus =

Scientific classification
- Kingdom: Plantae
- Clade: Tracheophytes
- Clade: Angiosperms
- Clade: Eudicots
- Clade: Rosids
- Order: Rosales
- Family: Rosaceae
- Genus: Rubus
- Species: R. paludivagus

Binomial name
- Rubus paludivagus Fernald 1940

Berry and plant

Rubus paludivagus is a rare North American species of flowering plant in the rose family. It has been found only on the edges of cranberry bogs on Cape Cod. This is in the Commonwealth (State) of Massachusetts, in the northeastern United States.

The genetics of Rubus is extremely complex, so that it is difficult to decide on which groups should be recognized as species. There are many rare species with limited ranges such as this. Further study is suggested to clarify the taxonomy.
