= Rubus plexus =

Scientific classification
- Kingdom: Plantae
- Clade: Tracheophytes
- Clade: Angiosperms
- Clade: Eudicots
- Clade: Rosids
- Order: Rosales
- Family: Rosaceae
- Genus: Rubus
- Species: R. plexus

Binomial name
- Rubus plexus Fernald

Species of fruit and plant

Rubus plexus is rare North American species of brambles in the rose family. It has been found only in the Commonwealth (state) of Virginia in the eastern United States.

The genetics of Rubus is extremely complex, so that it is difficult to decide on which groups should be recognized as species. There are many rare species with limited ranges such as this. Further study is suggested to clarify the taxonomy.
