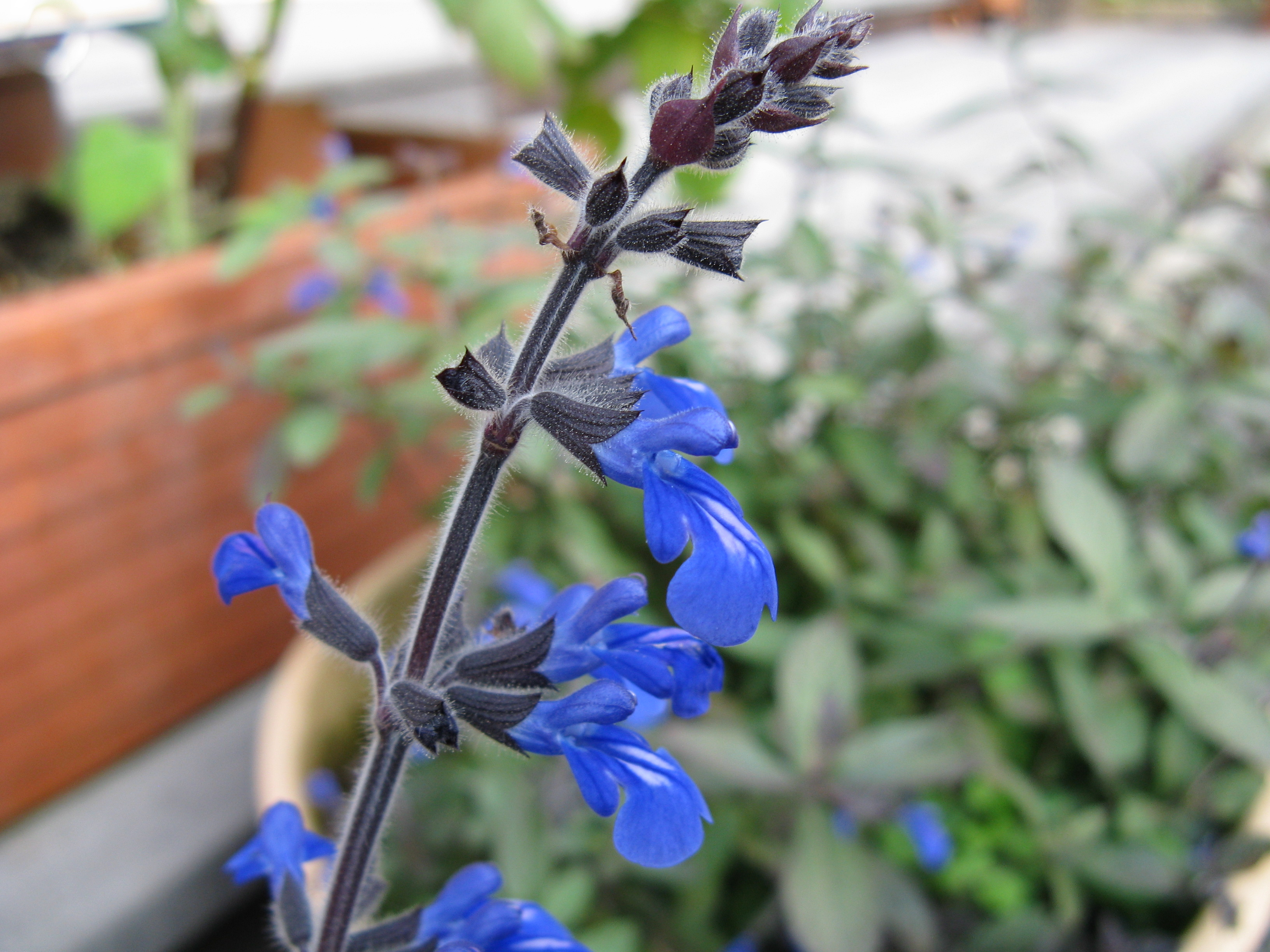

Scientific classification
- Kingdom: Plantae
- Clade: Tracheophytes
- Clade: Angiosperms
- Clade: Eudicots
- Clade: Asterids
- Order: Lamiales
- Family: Lamiaceae
- Genus: Salvia
- Species: S. sinaloensis

Binomial name
- Salvia sinaloensis Fernald

= Salvia sinaloensis =

Species of flowering plant

Salvia sinaloensis (Sinaloa sage) is a perennial native only to the Mexican state of Sinaloa, most often in the foothills of the Sierra Madre Occidental range. It has been available to gardeners since the 1980s. It has many graceful 1 ft. long stems, grows rapidly, and spreads on underground runners into a clump about 1 ft. wide. The flowers are an intense true blue, with the slightest hint of violet, a spot of white on the lower lip, and less than 1 inch long. The wine colored calyx remains long after the flower has dropped its petals.
