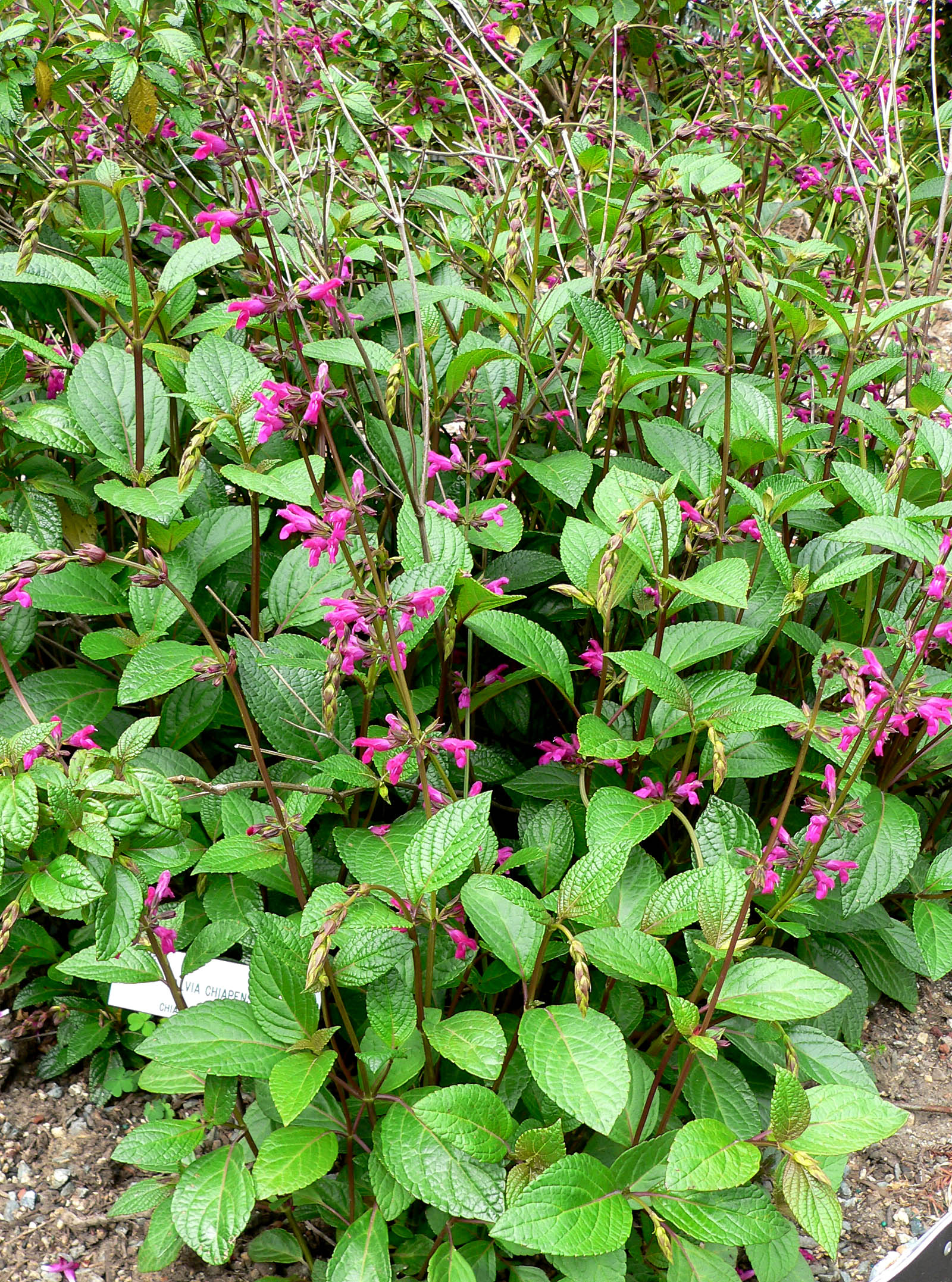

Scientific classification
- Kingdom: Plantae
- Clade: Tracheophytes
- Clade: Angiosperms
- Clade: Eudicots
- Clade: Asterids
- Order: Lamiales
- Family: Lamiaceae
- Genus: Salvia
- Species: S. chiapensis

Binomial name
- Salvia chiapensis Fernald

= Salvia chiapensis =

Species of flowering plant

Salvia chiapensis (Chiapas sage) is a herbaceous perennial native to the province of Chiapas, Mexico, growing between 7000 and 9500 feet elevation in cloud forests. It was introduced to horticulture in the 1980s, probably as a result of a collecting trip by the University of California Botanical Garden, Berkeley.

Chiapas sage grows about 1.5–2 feet (0.46–0.61 m) tall and wide, with several stems growing out of the rootstock. The 3-inch-long (76 mm) and 1.5-inch-wide (38 mm) elliptic-shaped leaves are ivy-green, glossy, and deeply veined, growing widely spaced along the stem. The flowers are bright fuchsia, with 3–6 flowers growing in whorls, widely spaced along the inflorescence. The flower is 0.75 inches (19 mm) long and covered in hairs, with a 0.5-inch-long (13 mm) pea-green calyx.
