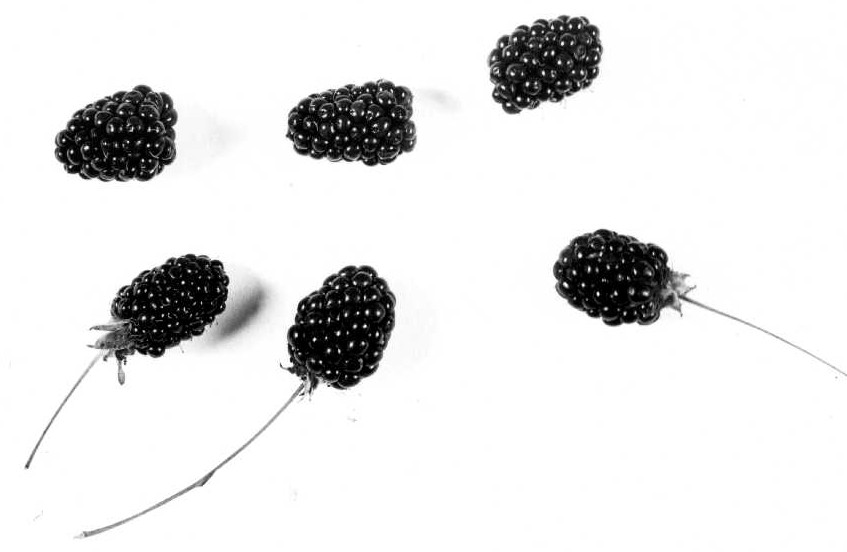

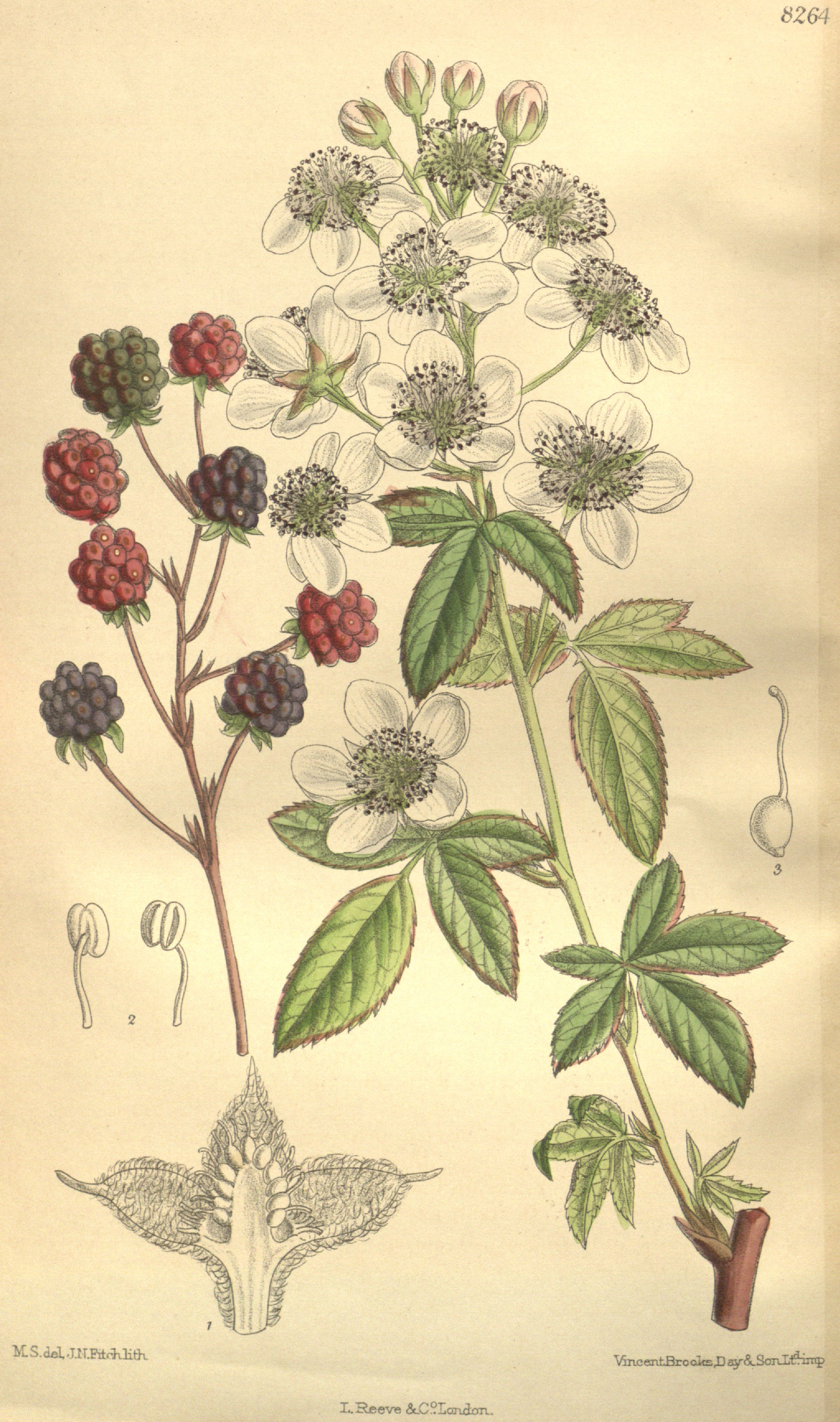
- 1909 Fitch illustration

Conservation status
- Secure (NatureServe)

Scientific classification
- Kingdom: Plantae
- Clade: Tracheophytes
- Clade: Angiosperms
- Clade: Eudicots
- Clade: Rosids
- Order: Rosales
- Family: Rosaceae
- Genus: Rubus
- Species: R. canadensis

Binomial name
- Rubus canadensis L. 1753 not Torr. 1824

Synonyms
- Synonymy: Rubus amnicola Blanch.; Rubus argutus var. randii (L.H.Bailey) L.H.Bailey; Rubus besseyi L.H.Bailey; Rubus canadensis var. imus L.H.Bailey; Rubus canadensis var. millspaughii (Britton) Blanch.; Rubus forestalis L.H.Bailey; Rubus illustris L.H.Bailey; Rubus irregularis L.H.Bailey; Rubus laetabilis L.H.Bailey; Rubus millspaughii Britton; Rubus orariu] Blanch.; Rubus pergratus Blanch.; Rubus pergratus Edees & A.Newton; Rubus pergratus var. terrae-novae Fernald; Rubus randii (L.H.Bailey) Rydb.; Rubus suberectus Hook.; Rubus villosus var. randii L.H.Bailey; Selnorition canadensis (L.) Raf. ex B.D.Jacks.; Rubus invisus (L.H.Bailey) L.H.Bailey; Rubus jactus L.H.Bailey; Rubus macdanielsii L.H.Bailey; Rubus masseyi L.H.Bailey; Rubus redundans L.H.Bailey; Rubus sanfordii L.H.Bailey; Rubus terraltanus L.H.Bailey

= Rubus canadensis =

Species of flowering plant

Rubus canadensis is a North American species of flowering plant in the rose family known by the common names smooth blackberry, Canadian blackberry, thornless blackberry and smooth highbush blackberry.

== Description ==
This rhizomatous shrub forms thickets up to 2 to 3 meters (6 1/2 to 10 ft) tall. The plant reproduces by seed, by sprouting up from the rhizome, and by layering. The stems can grow 1 m (3 1/2 ft) in height in under two months. The leaves are deciduous and alternately arranged, each measuring 10 to 20 centimeters (4 to 8 inches) long.

The inflorescence is a cluster of up to 25 flowers. The fruit is an aggregate of many small drupes, each of which contains a tiny nutlet.

== Distribution and habitat ==
It is native to central and eastern Canada (from Newfoundland to Ontario) and the eastern United States (New England, the Great Lakes region, and the Appalachian Mountains). It has also been sparingly recorded in Great Britain, in which it is often confused for the many other native blackberry species. Rubus canadensis grows in many types of forested habitat, as well as on disturbed sites.

== Ecology ==
Associated plants may include Acer spicatum (mountain maple), Amelanchier spp. (serviceberry), Viburnum alnifolium (hobblebush), Sambucus pubens (scarlet elder), Rubus allegheniensis (common blackberry), Corylus cornuta (beaked hazel), Vaccinium erythrocarpum (southern mountain cranberry), Menziesia pilosa (minnie-bush), and Rhododendron catawbiense (rosebay).

Many types of animals feed on the fruits and foliage of this shrub. The thickets provide cover and nesting sites.

== Uses ==
The fruits of this plant provided food for Native American groups, who also used parts of the plant medicinally at times.
