= Shirley Gale Cross =

American botanist, botanical illustrator

- Born: Shirley Gale; August 27, 1915; Oklahoma, US
- Died: July 14, 2008 (aged 92); East Sandwich, Massachusetts, US
- Education: Massachusetts State College; Radcliffe College
- Known for: Founding member of the Thornton W. Burgess Society
- Spouse: Chester "Chet" Ellsworth Cross
- Children: 3
- Scientific career
- Fields: Botany
- Doctoral advisor: Merritt Lyndon Fernald
- Author abbrev. (botany): Gale

Shirley Gale Cross (August 27, 1915, Oklahoma – July 14, 2008, East Sandwich, Massachusetts) was an American botanist, botanical illustrator, and conservationist.

== Biography ==
Shirley Gale grew up in Gloucester and Marblehead and graduated from Massachusetts State College (renamed in 1947 the University of Massachusetts Amherst). At Radcliffe College, she received her Ph.D. in 1939 with M. L. Fernald as her thesis supervisor.

Born Shirley Gale in 1915, she ... received her doctorate in systematic botany from Radcliffe, now Harvard University, at a time when women were separated from men in class by use of a curtain, according to her daughter-in-law, Susan Cross. During this time, she drew many meticulously accurate botanicals as part of her studies.

In 1941, she married Chester "Chet" E. Cross (1913–1988), her classmate who received a Ph.D. in paleobotany from Harvard. The couple moved to the Spring Hill Historic District of Sandwich, Massachusetts, where they owned and cultivated three cranberry bogs to supply cranberries for the fresh fruit market. They continued growing cranberries until shortly before Chet Cross's death. She and Gordon Dillon drew the illustrations for Edith Scamman's 1947 book Ferns and Fern Allies of New Hampshire. Shirley Gale Cross drew the Rhynchospora illustrations and many of the fern illustrations for the 8th edition of Gray's Manual of Botany.

She and Chet had a long-abiding interest in alpine flowers, stimulated first on family climbs in New Hampshire’s White Mountains in the 1930s and continuing with a family celebration near the summit of Mount Washington in June 2005. In between, they viewed and photographed the alpine flora on the volcanic slopes of central Hokkaido, Japan; on a climb through the rhododendron forests to over 12,000 feet in the Langtang Valley north of Kathmandu, Nepal; on the precipitous Andean slopes of Bolivia and Peru; and in Switzerland’s picturesque Alps. Later, in 1997, Shirley journeyed to Namaqualand in western South Africa to see the desert bloom.

Cross was a founding member of the Thornton W. Burgess Society and conceived, designed, cultivated, and organized the Society's wildflower garden named in her honor.

Upon her death, she was survived by three sons, six grandchildren, and one great-grandchild.
