= Cyperus hystricinus =

Scientific classification
- Kingdom: Plantae
- Clade: Tracheophytes
- Clade: Angiosperms
- Clade: Monocots
- Clade: Commelinids
- Order: Poales
- Family: Cyperaceae
- Genus: Cyperus
- Species: C. hystricinus

Binomial name
- Cyperus hystricinus Fernald, 1906

Species of sedge

Cyperus hystricinus is a species of sedge that is native to southern parts of North America.

This species has been observed growing in sandhill communities and pine communities. It has displayed preference for sandy soils and sunny conditions.

== See also ==
- List of Cyperus species
