= Minna Fernald =

American artist and botanical illustrator

- Born: Minna Rose Simon; 1860; Baltimore, US
- Died: 1954 (aged 93–94); Florida, US
- Known for: Watercolor paintings of Florida plants.
- Spouse: Henry Torsey Fernald (m. 1890)

Minna Rose Fernald (1860–1954) was an American botanical artist. Her subjects were mainly landscapes and wildflowers. She received awards for her art and also a medal for work with the Red Cross during World War I.

She was born Minna Rose Simon in Baltimore in 1860 and was a relative of the botanist Merritt Fernald. She lived initially in Maryland and then briefly in Pennsylvania but spent most of her life in Massachusetts. After education in Germany she trained at the Maryland Institute under Hugh Newell of the American Watercolor Society. Fernald's work was exhibited in Amherst, Massachusetts. She accompanied her husband (Henry Torsey Fernald, married on 9 June 1890) in moving from Massachusetts to Winter Park, Florida in 1924 when he retired. She won many awards in the Central Florida Exposition and in exhibitions of the Florida Federation of Art. They had three children.

She donated her watercolors to the University of Florida Herbarium in 1942 and they are now curated at the Florida Museum of Natural History.

There are around 320 watercolors in the collection. As well as the botanical accuracy of the paintings, that required her to study in the field, they are important as a record of the native flora of Florida prior to substantial urbanization and agricultural land-use.

Fernald died in 1954.
