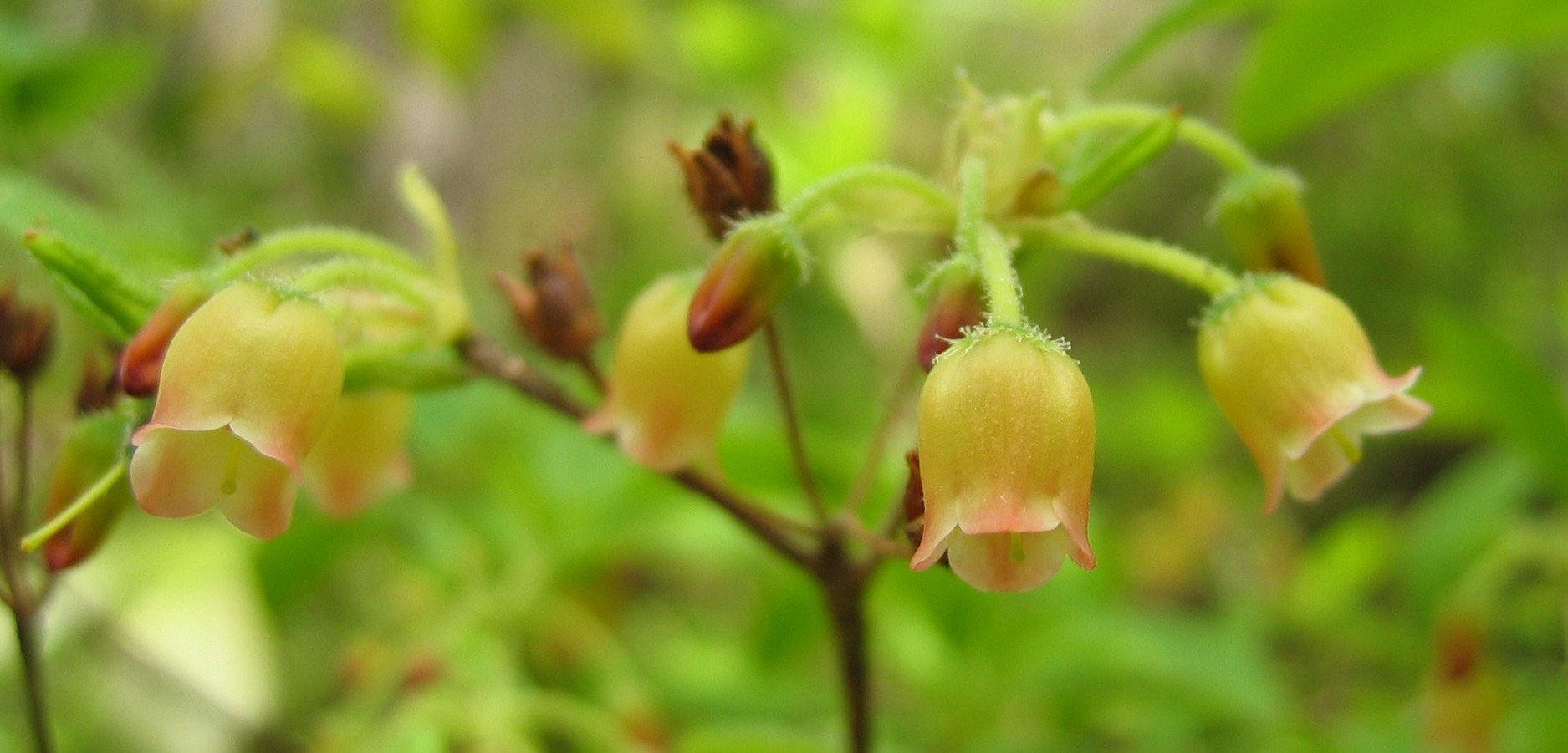

Scientific classification
- Kingdom: Plantae
- Clade: Tracheophytes
- Clade: Angiosperms
- Clade: Eudicots
- Clade: Asterids
- Order: Ericales
- Family: Ericaceae
- Genus: Rhododendron
- Species: R. pilosum

Binomial name
- Rhododendron pilosum (Michx. ex Lam.) Craven

Synonyms
- Azalea pilosa Michx. ex Lam.; Candollea azaleoides Baumg.; Menziesia ferruginea var. globularis A.Gray; Menziesia globularis Salisb.; Menziesia pilosa (Michx. ex Lam.) Juss.; Menziesia smithii Michx.

= Rhododendron pilosum =

Species of plant

Rhododendron pilosum (syn. Menziesia pilosa), the minniebush, is a species of flowering plant in the family Ericaceae. A shrub reaching 6 ft (1.8 m), it is typically found growing in the Appalachian Mountains from southern Pennsylvania to Georgia.
