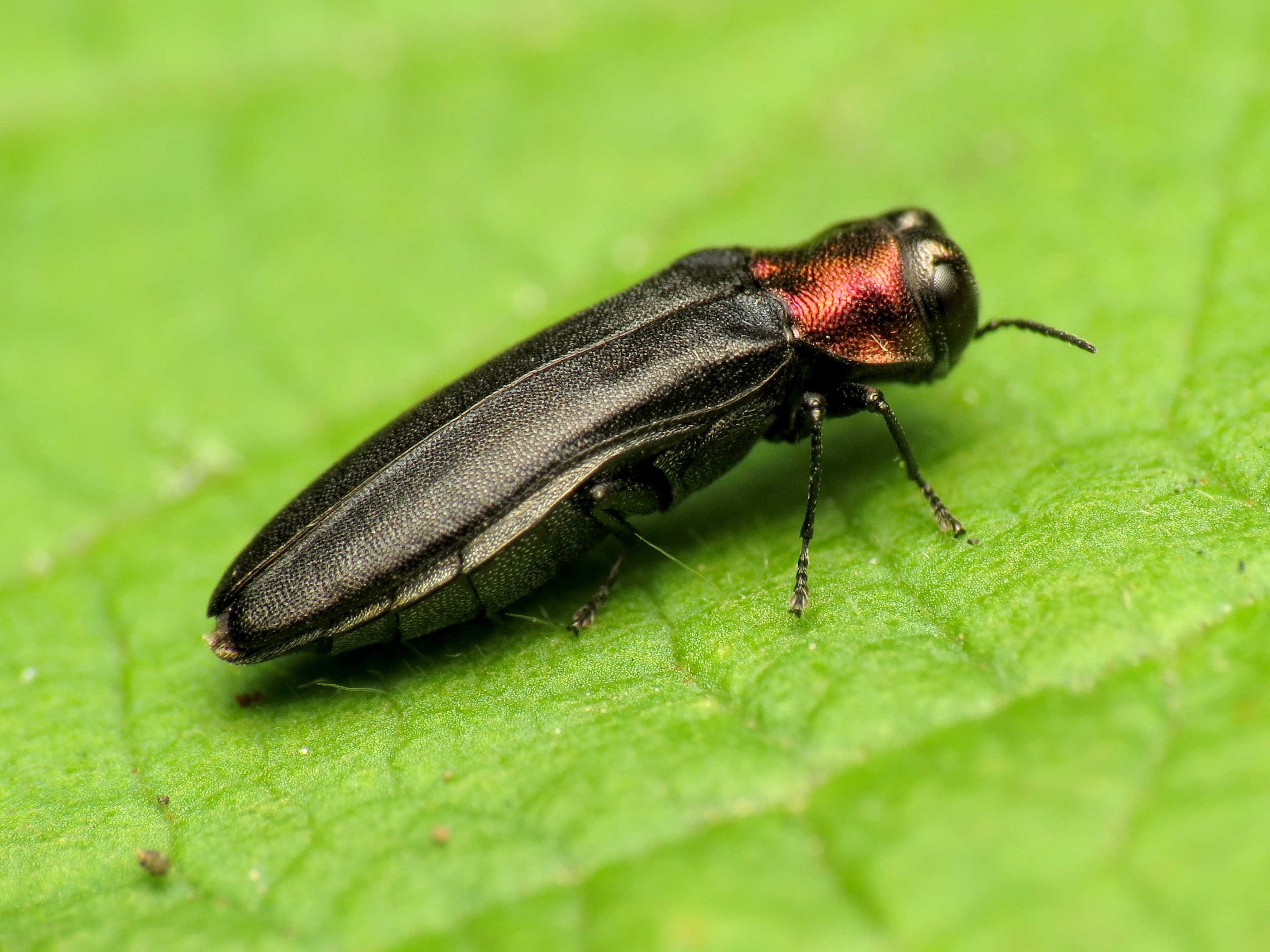

Scientific classification
- Kingdom: Animalia
- Phylum: Arthropoda
- Clade: Pancrustacea
- Class: Insecta
- Order: Coleoptera
- Suborder: Polyphaga
- Infraorder: Elateriformia
- Family: Buprestidae
- Genus: Agrilus
- Species: A. ruficollis

Binomial name
- Agrilus ruficollis (Fabricius, 1787)

Synonyms
- Agrilus cupricollis Gory, 1841; Agrilus impressiceps Pic, 1918

= Agrilus ruficollis =

Species of beetle

Agrilus ruficollis, the red-necked cane borer, is a species of metallic wood-boring beetle in the family Buprestidae. It is found in Europe and Northern Asia (excluding China) and North America.

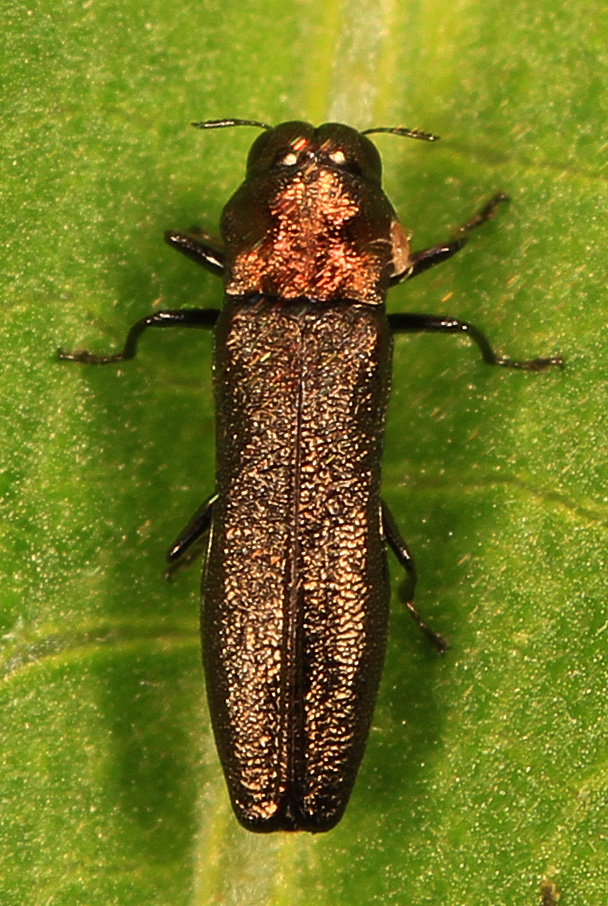
Red-necked cane borer, Agrilus ruficollis
