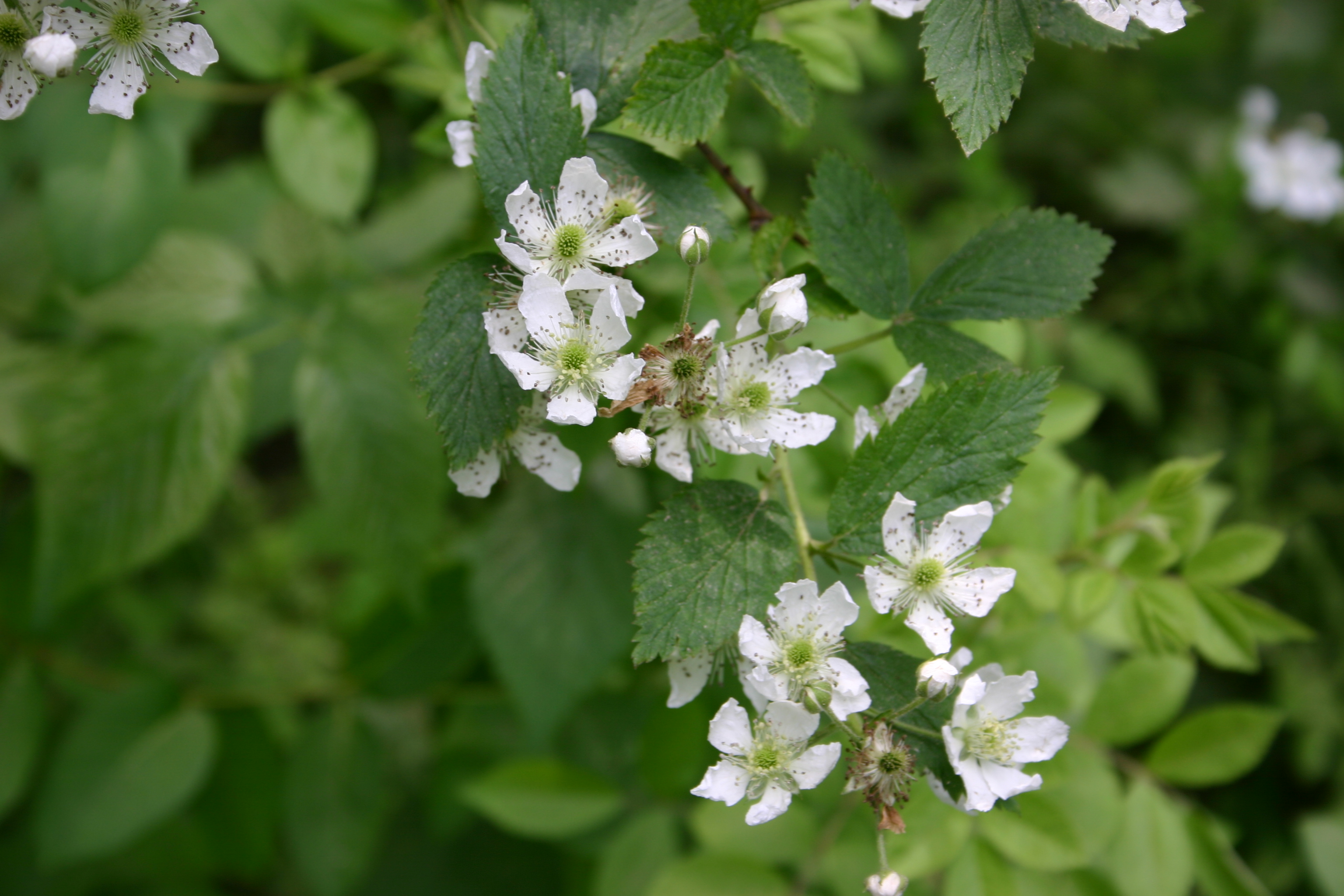

Scientific classification
- Kingdom: Plantae
- Clade: Embryophytes
- Clade: Tracheophytes
- Clade: Spermatophytes
- Clade: Angiosperms
- Clade: Eudicots
- Clade: Rosids
- Order: Rosales
- Family: Rosaceae
- Genus: Rubus
- Species: R. pensilvanicus

Binomial name
- Rubus pensilvanicus Poir. 1804

Synonyms
- List: Rubus abactus L.H.Bailey; Rubus ablatus L.H.Bailey; Rubus amnicola Blanch.; Rubus andrewsianus Blanch.; Rubus angustus L.H.Bailey; Rubus argutus var. scissus L.H.Bailey; Rubus arrectus L.H.Bailey; Rubus arvensis L.H.Bailey; Rubus associus Hanes ex L.H.Bailey; Rubus barbarus L.H.Bailey; Rubus bellobatus L.H.Bailey; Rubus blakei L.H.Bailey; Rubus bractealis L.H.Bailey; Rubus brainerdii Fernald; Rubus brainerdii Rydb.; Rubus burnhamii L.H.Bailey; Rubus cardianus L.H.Bailey; Rubus cauliflorus L.H.Bailey; Rubus condensiflorus L.H.Bailey; Rubus congruus L.H.Bailey; Rubus cupressorum Fernald; Rubus defectionis Fernald; Rubus demareanus L.H.Bailey; Rubus densipubens L.H.Bailey; Rubus densissimus H.A.Davis & T.Davis; Rubus difformis L.H.Bailey; Rubus eriensis L.H.Bailey; Rubus facetus L.H.Bailey; Rubus fatuus L.H.Bailey; Rubus frondosus (Torr.) Bigelow; Rubus fructifer L.H.Bailey; Rubus gattingeri L.H.Bailey; Rubus gnarus L.H.Bailey; Rubus harperi L.H.Bailey; Rubus heterogeneus L.H.Bailey; Rubus honorus L.H.Bailey; Rubus humilior L.H.Bailey; Rubus impar L.H.Bailey; Rubus independens L.H.Bailey; Rubus insons L.H.Bailey; Rubus insulanus L.H.Bailey; Rubus interioris L.H.Bailey; Rubus jennisonii L.H.Bailey; Rubus jugosus L.H.Bailey; Rubus kansanus L.H.Bailey; Rubus kelloggii L.H.Bailey; Rubus latifoliolus L.H.Bailey; Rubus leggii H.A.Davis & T.Davis; Rubus libratus L.H.Bailey; Rubus limulus L.H.Bailey; Rubus litoreus L.H.Bailey; Rubus missouricus L.H.Bailey; Rubus mollior L.H.Bailey; Rubus monongaliensis L.H.Bailey; Rubus multispinus Blanch.; Rubus nescius L.H.Bailey; Rubus offectus L.H.Bailey; Rubus oklahomus L.H.Bailey; Rubus oppositus L.H.Bailey; Rubus ozarkensis L.H.Bailey; Rubus paludivagus Fernald; Rubus pauxillus L.H.Bailey; Rubus pensilvanicus f. albinus E.J.Palmer & Steyerm.; Rubus pensilvanicus var. frondosus (Bigelow ex Torr.) B.Boivin; Rubus pensilvanicus f. phyllophorus Fernald; Rubus perfoliosus L.H.Bailey; Rubus perpauper L.H.Bailey; Rubus persistens Rydb.; Rubus philadelphicus Blanch.; Rubus praepes L.H.Bailey; Rubus pratensis L.H.Bailey; Rubus prestonensis H.A.Davis & T.Davis; Rubus pubifolius L.H.Bailey; Rubus pulchriflorus L.H.Bailey; Rubus putus L.H.Bailey; Rubus ramifer L.H.Bailey; Rubus recurvans Blanch.; Rubus recurvans var. subrecurvans Blanch.; Rubus rosarius L.H.Bailey; Rubus rydbergianus L.H.Bailey; Rubus saepescandens L.H.Bailey; Rubus schneckii L.H.Bailey; Rubus scibilis L.H.Bailey; Rubus senilis L.H.Bailey; Rubus subsolanus L.H.Bailey; Rubus subtentus L.H.Bailey; Rubus subtractus L.H.Bailey; Rubus summotus L.H.Bailey; Rubus suus L.H.Bailey; Rubus texanus L.H.Bailey; Rubus tygartensis H.A.Davis & T.Davis; Rubus ucetanus L.H.Bailey; Rubus uniquus L.H.Bailey; Rubus villosus var. frondosus Bigelow ex Torr.; Rubus vixargutus L.H.Bailey; Rubus wahlii L.H.Bailey; Rubus wiegandii L.H.Bailey; Rubus zoae L.H.Bailey

= Rubus pensilvanicus =

Berry and plant

Rubus pensilvanicus, known commonly as Pennsylvania blackberry, is a species of prickly bramble. The perennial shrub grows up to 2.4 metres (8 ft) tall. The leaves have up to seven leaflets. The flowers are white with large petals, borne in mid-spring to summer.

The species is native to eastern and central North America. The fruits are edible and can be made into jams and jellies.

== Description ==
Rubus pensilvanicus is a perennial bramble growing up to 2.4 metres (8 ft) tall. The canes are green at first but then turn dark red, usually ridged, with copious sharp prickles. The bark of the mature plant is thin and smooth, while the twigs exhibit a winter coloration in shades of brown or gray. The winter buds are characterized by three or more scales, overlapping like shingles, with one edge covered and the other exposed.

The leaves are palmately compound and usually composed of two to seven discrete leaflets. Along the stem, there is a single leaf per node. The leaf blade edges are serrated, featuring distinct teeth. In terms of leaf duration, the leaves either drop off during winter or wither but persist on the plant. Notably, the plant is armed with spines, prickles, or thorns. The dimensions of the leaf blade range from 11 to 22 centimetres (4 1/2 to 8 1/2 in) in both length and width. Each leaf possesses a leaf stalk.

The flowers are white with large petals, borne in mid-spring to summer. This particular species is hermaphroditic, possessing both male and female reproductive organs, with pollination primarily facilitated by insects. The fruits are large aggregates of 10–100 black drupelets that are black to purple in color and fleshy in texture.

== Taxonomy ==
Rubus pensilvanicus is also known as Rubus abactus a synonym. In 1804 R. pensilvanicus was described by Jean Louis Marie Poiret in Encyclopedie Methodique: Botanique. Some common names include: Blackberry, Dewberry, Pennsylvania Blackberry.

The genetics of Rubus are extremely complex, making it difficult to separate the group into species. What some authors lump together as R. pensilvanicus, other authors split into as many as 50 or 60 species.

=== Etymology ===
The name "pensilvanicus" alludes to a strong presence in the Keystone State, Pennsylvania.

== Distribution and habitat ==
Rubus pensilvanicus is native to eastern and central North America, stretching from Newfoundland south to Georgia and reaching westward to Ontario, Minnesota, Nebraska, Missouri, and Arkansas. It is concentraterd in Pennsylvania and New York, with a few patches of distribution in the Midwest.

The preferred environmental conditions for the species encompass a range of light exposures, thriving in full sun conditions with a requirement of 6 or more hours of direct sunlight per day. Alternatively, it can adapt to partial shade, where direct sunlight is available only part of the day, totaling 2–6 hours. Regarding soil texture, this species demonstrates versatility, showing affinity for clay, high organic matter, loam (silt), and shallow rocky substrates. Its adaptability extends to varying soil pH levels, with a preference for acidic conditions (<6.0), tolerance for alkaline environments (>8.0), and an ability to flourish in neutral pH ranges (6.0-8.0). Moreover, the plant exhibits adaptability to different soil drainage patterns, thriving in settings with good drainage, as well as in moist conditions and occasionally dry soils. This flexibility in light, soil texture, pH, and drainage underscores the resilience and adaptability of Rubus pensilvanicus across diverse environmental settings.

Rubus pensilvanicus is an early successional plant that is often found in clear-cuts. Frequent disturbance is necessary for Rubus pensilvanicus to grow and thrive.

Classified as facultative (FAC) by the US National Wetlands Plant list, this plant species is equally likely to thrive in both wetland and non-wetland environments, with an estimated probability ranging from 34% to 66%.

== Ecology ==
Phragmidium violaceum is a rust fungus that can infect Rubus pensilvanicus. This fungus is from France and was first reported to infect R. pensilvanicus in 2005.

Thorny canes deter humans and some animals from trampling through it. The leaves serve as a browse for white-tailed deer. This bramble is year-round exceptional cover for wildlife. The fruits are an important resource for songbirds, small mammals, foxes, raccoons, and even black bears. As winter arrives, birds and small mammals eat the seeds left behind from decomposed fruit. The flowers attract butterflies and various other pollinators.

== Conservation ==
Rubus pensilvanicus is apparently secure in Nova Scotia. While other parts of Canada like New Brunswick and Québec it is listed as S3 vulnerable.

== Uses ==
The edible fruits are somewhat sweet and often used for jams and jellies.

These blackberries can be used for inks or for dyeing cloths, which is not a new practice. Blackberries are also a good source of nutrients and are eaten dried by Native Americans.

The roots of R. pensilvanicus have historically been used to create a tea used to treat cold symptoms and cure dysentery.
