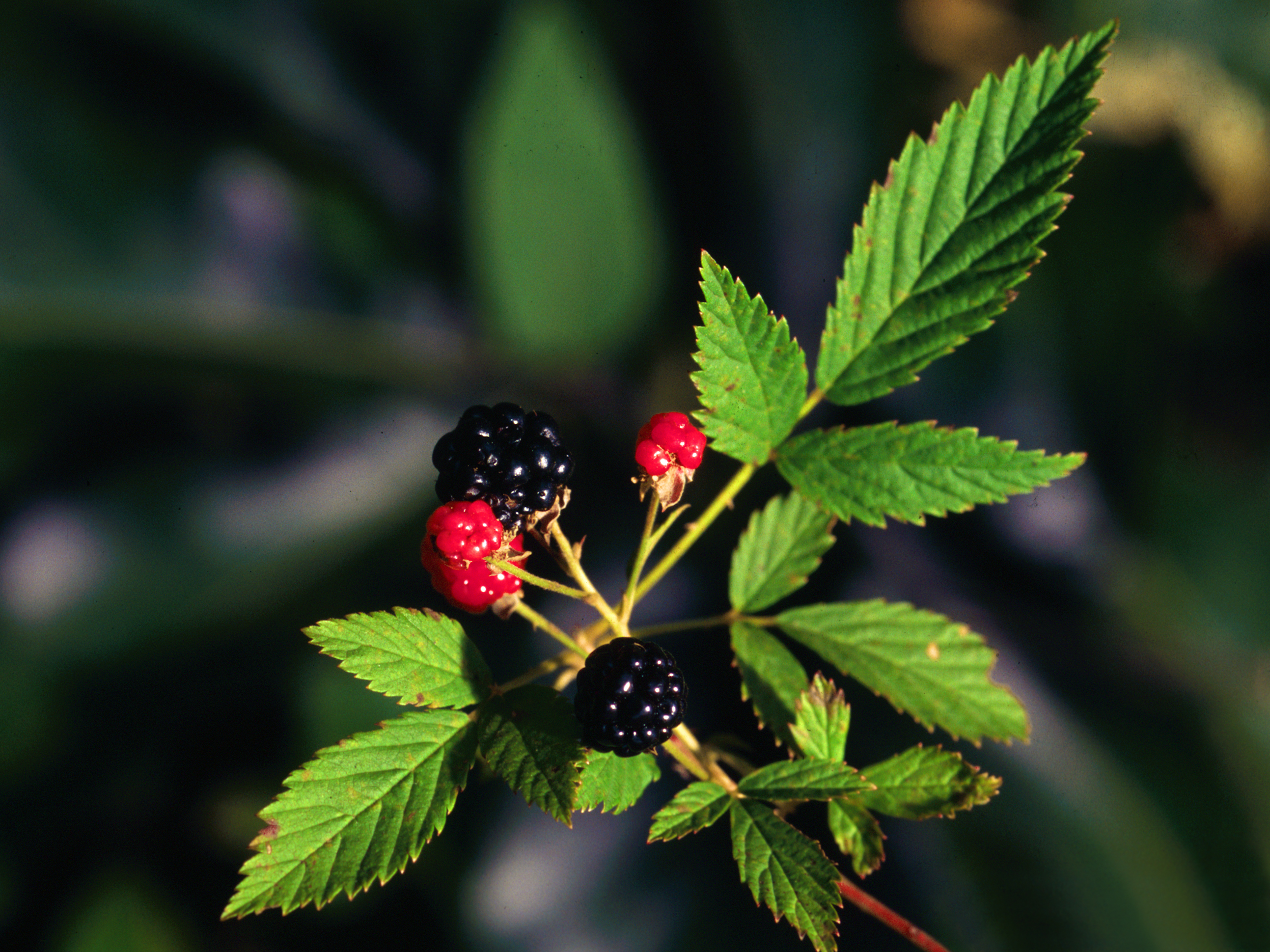
- Berries and leaves

Scientific classification
- Kingdom: Plantae
- Clade: Tracheophytes
- Clade: Angiosperms
- Clade: Eudicots
- Clade: Rosids
- Order: Rosales
- Family: Rosaceae
- Genus: Rubus
- Species: R. flagellaris

Binomial name
- Rubus flagellaris Willd.

Synonyms
- Synonymy: Rubus alacer L.H.Bailey; Rubus arundelanus Blanch.; Rubus bonus L.H.Bailey; Rubus camurus L.H.Bailey; Rubus clausenii L.H.Bailey; Rubus connixus L.H.Bailey; Rubus dissitiflorus Fernald; Rubus exemptus L.H.Bailey; Rubus flagellaris var. roseoplenus E.J. Palmer & Steyerm.; Rubus jeckylianus Blanch.; Rubus longipes Fernald; Rubus maltei L.H.Bailey; Rubus michiganensis L.H.Bailey; Rubus neonefrens L.H.Bailey; Rubus occultus L.H.Bailey; Rubus procumbens W.C.Barton; Rubus procumbens Muhl.; Rubus sailori L.H.Bailey; Rubus serenus L.H.Bailey; Rubus subuniflorus Rydb.; Rubus tetricus L.H.Bailey; Rubus tracyi L.H.Bailey

= Rubus flagellaris =

Species of shrub

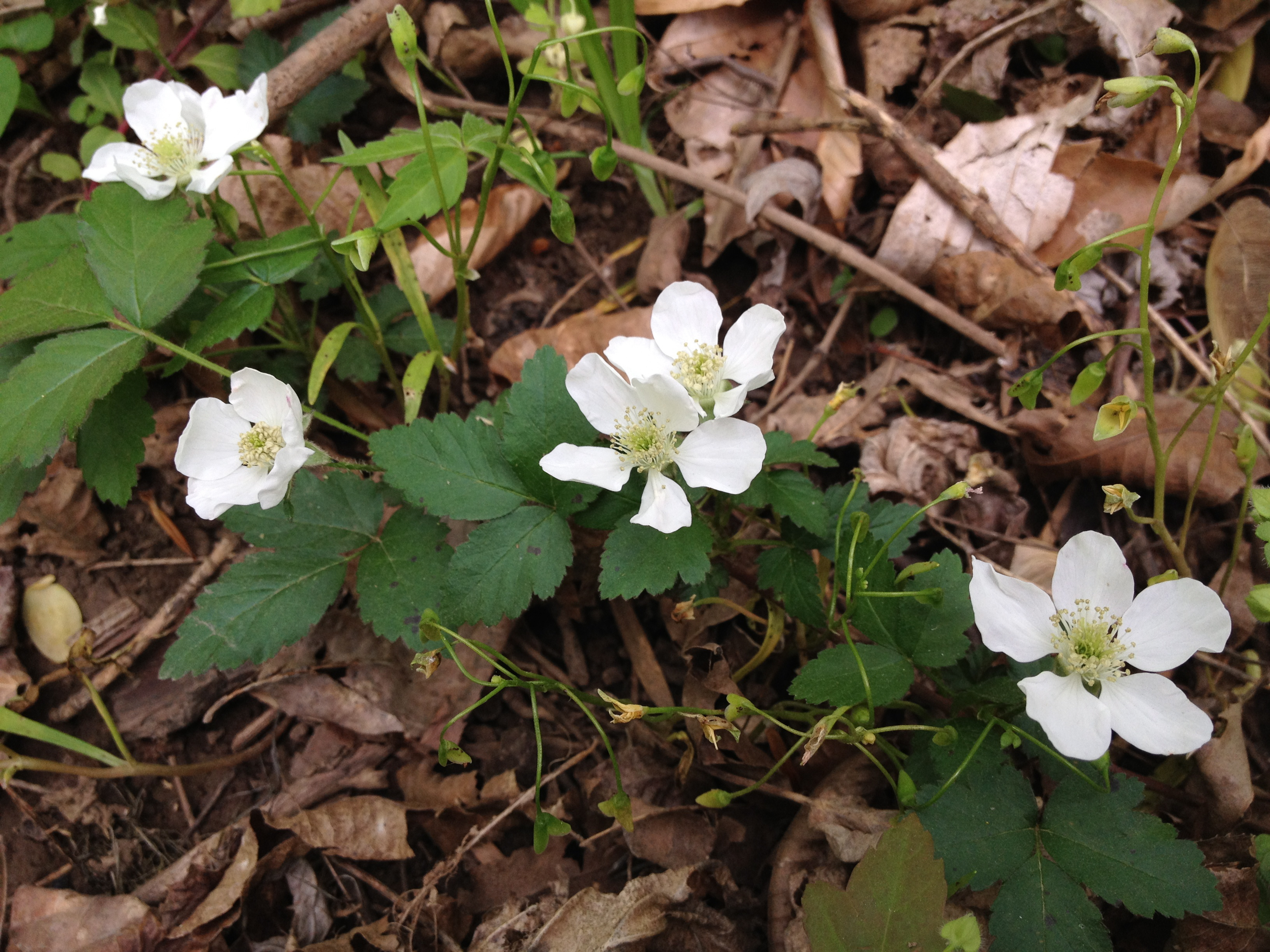
Flowers

Rubus flagellaris is a North American species of dewberry in the genus Rubus, a member of the rose family. It is commonly known as northern dewberry and common dewberry. It is widely distributed across the southern and eastern United States into adjacent Canada.

== Description ==
Rubus flagellaris has low-growing stems that range from 8–15 feet (2.4–4.6 m) long, and flowering stems that can grow up to 4 feet (1.2 m) in height. It can grow as a woody vine or low growing shrub. The young stems are green with a scattered arrangement of hairy prickles. The old stems are brown, woody and have hard prickles in comparison to the young stem. Sometimes the tips of the young stems root into the ground and form vegetative offsets.

The species has its most active growth from mid-spring to early summer. The roots of the northern dewberry consist of a woody taproot.

The plant has an alternate, compound leaf arrangement, with mostly three, but sometimes five leaflets per leaf. The margins of the leaves are serrated and the leaves show a palmate venation. Each leaflet is ovate, approximately three inches (75 mm) long and one inch (25 mm) wide. The leaflets are green on top, but pale green on the underside. One leaflet of a set is connected by a petiole to the stem while the other leaflets in the set are connected to that terminal leaflet.

The plant produces a five-petaled white flower about one inch (25 mm) in diameter. The flowers exhibit a terminal inflorescence with one to five flowers per young stem. The flowers are hermaphrodites and have both female and male sex organs. There are five sepals, green in appearance, lanceolate in shape. The ovaries exhibit a superior position relative to the sepals and petals. Several stamen surround a cluster of carpels. The flowers open during the day and close at night.

Once the flowers of the northern dewberry are fertilized, drupes soon grow and replace each flower. The drupes are a dark-purplish color and range from ½ inch to one inch in diameter. Once the fruit has fully ripened it has a tart-sweet flavor.

== Distribution and habitat ==
Rubus flagellaris is native to the central and eastern United States (from Texas, Oklahoma, Kansas, and Nebraska to the Gulf and East Coasts and the Great Lakes region), eastern Canada (Ontario, Quebec, New Brunswick, and Nova Scotia) and northern Mexico (Coahuila, Hidalgo, Nuevo León, San Luis Potosí, Sonora).

Rubus flagellaris grows on dry soils, bogs, soft soils and wooded soils. This species is actually especially adapted to coarse textured soils (such as sandy soils), fine textured soils (such as loamy soils) and medium textured soils (such as clay-textured soils). R. flagellaris grows in a wide range of habitats including mesic to dry savannas and sandy savannas, abandoned fields, meadows in wooded areas, and woodland borders.

Rubus flagellaris is adapted to a precipitation zone that ranges from 15 to 40 inches/year, tolerates soils ranging from 5.0 to 7.0 pH, and can survive temperatures as low as −23 °F (−31 °C). This species has a low tolerance to drought conditions and an intermediate shade tolerance, when compared to other species with similar growth habits in its natural regions. The plant has no salinity tolerance.

== Ecology ==
Many animals such as raccoons, fox squirrels, eastern chipmunks, white-footed mice, and other mammals eat the northern dewberry's fruits, and aid in the dispersal of the shrub. The plant has a high tolerance to hedging from livestock or wildlife browsing.

The flowers, with a fragrant nectar, attract a large number of native bees. They also provide nesting materials and structures for the native bees. Some of the bee species that interact with the plant and pollinate the flowers are mason bees (of the genus Osmia), leaf-cutting bees, cuckoo bees (of the subfamily Nomadinae), and miner bees. Other insects that interact with the northern dewberry to help pollinate it are Siphonophora rubi (blackberry aphid), Metallus rubi (blackberry leafminer), Agrilus ruficollis (red-necked cane borer), and Edwardsiana rosae (rose leafhopper).

The flowers are also a preferred source of nectar for the Karner blue, an endangered species of blue butterfly found in the Midwestern U.S. and northeastern North America.

When occasional wildfires burn down tall woody trees surrounding R. flagellaris, the resulting burning has a positive effect on population growth for the species. Other research has also shown that occasional wildfires are beneficial to the population's growth.

Rubus flagellaris is insect pollinated and is recorded to have been visited in northern Florida by Lasioglossum pectorale, Ceratina, and Osmia inspergens.

== Uses ==
The ripe berries are edible and can be eaten raw. They are also used to make preserves, pies, and cobblers.
