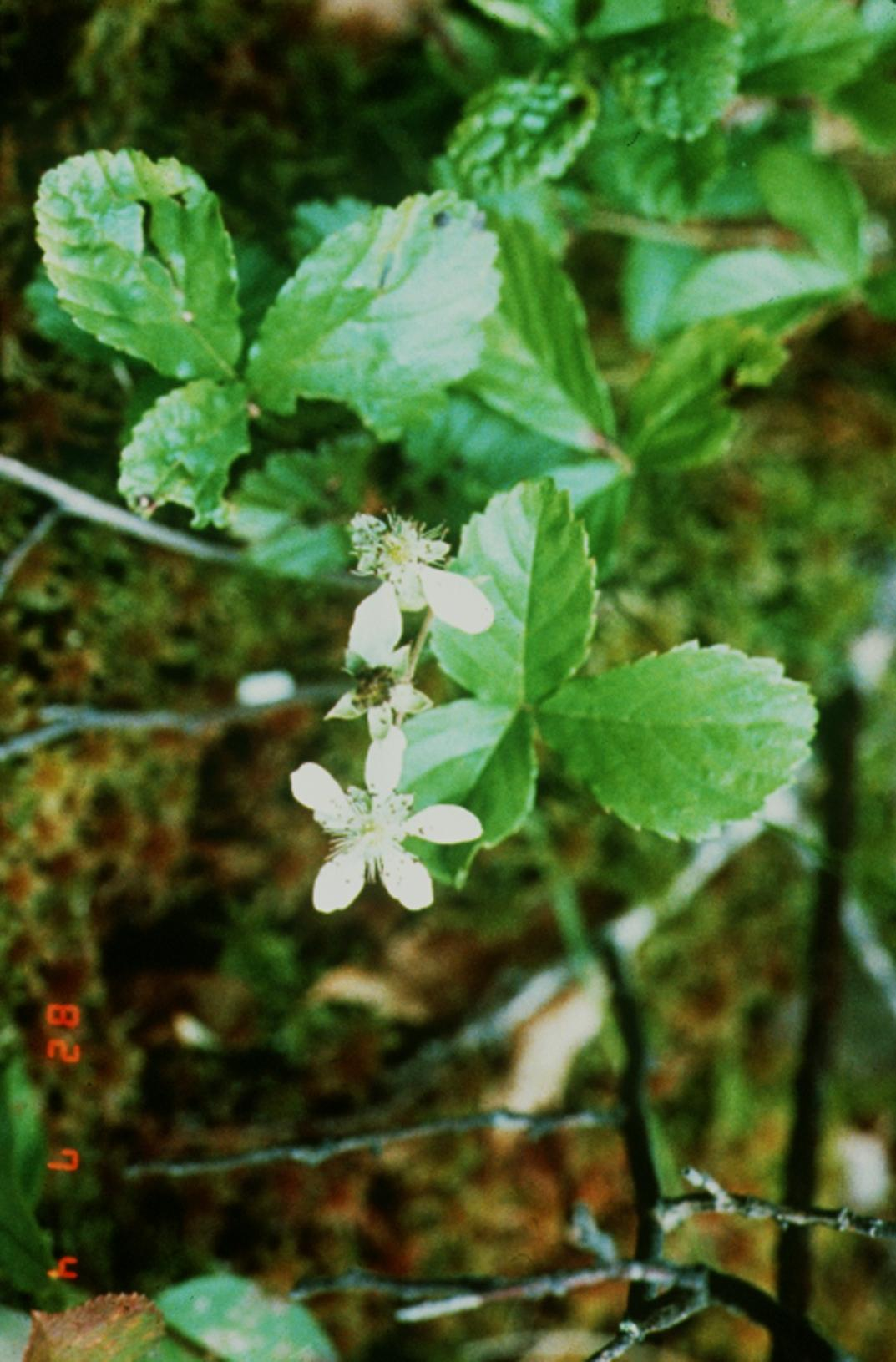

Scientific classification
- Kingdom: Plantae
- Clade: Embryophytes
- Clade: Tracheophytes
- Clade: Angiosperms
- Clade: Eudicots
- Clade: Rosids
- Order: Rosales
- Family: Rosaceae
- Genus: Rubus
- Species: R. hispidus

Binomial name
- Rubus hispidus L. 1753 not Marshall 1785 nor Mercier 1861 nor Hablitz ex Ledeb. 1844

Synonyms
- Rubus huttonii L.H.Bailey; Rubus davisiorum L.H.Bailey; Rubus obovalis Michx.; Rubus obovatus Elliott; Rubus pervarius (L.H.Bailey) L.H.Bailey; Rubus sempervirens Bigelow; Selnorition obovalis (Michx.) Raf. ex B.D.Jacks.

= Rubus hispidus =

Berry and plant

Rubus hispidus, with the common names bristly dewberry, bristly groundberry, groundberry, hispid swamp blackberry, running swamp blackberry or swamp dewberry, is North American species of dewberry in the rose family.

== Description ==
Rubus hispidus is a small, herb-like shrub up to 20 centimetres (8 inches) tall. The twigs are red and have bristles.

The flowers are generally in small clumps, each with five white rounded petals. The fruit are dark purple, almost black.

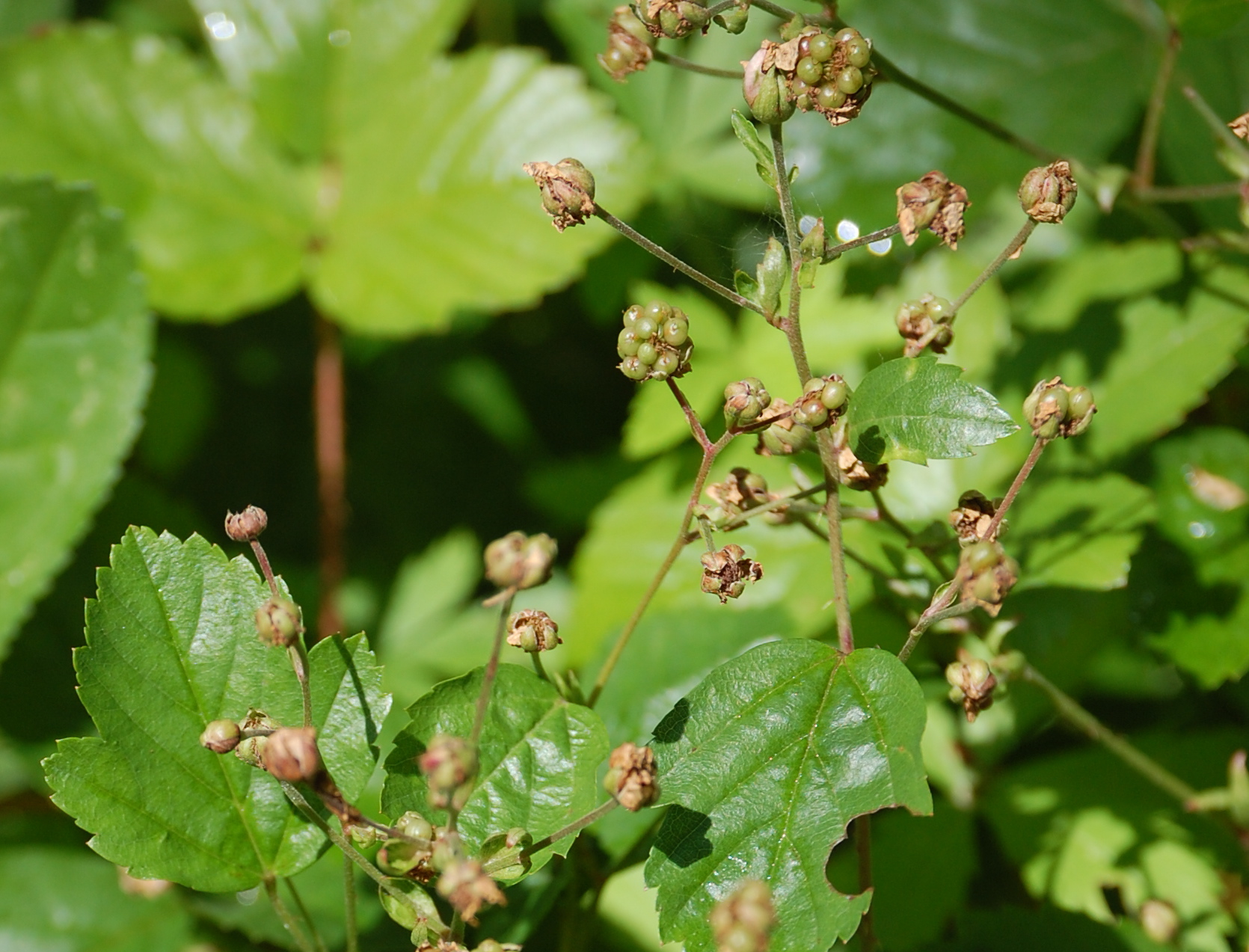
Unripe berries

== Distribution and habitat ==
The plant grows in moist or sometimes dry soils, ditches, swales or open woods in central and eastern North America, from Ontario and Minnesota east to Newfoundland, and south to South Carolina and Mississippi.

== Ecology ==
The plant is eaten by birds and many mammals.

== Uses ==
A dull blue dye can be created from its berries. The fruit also can be used as an astringent.

The berries are rather bitter for culinary use, so this plant is not generally cultivated.
