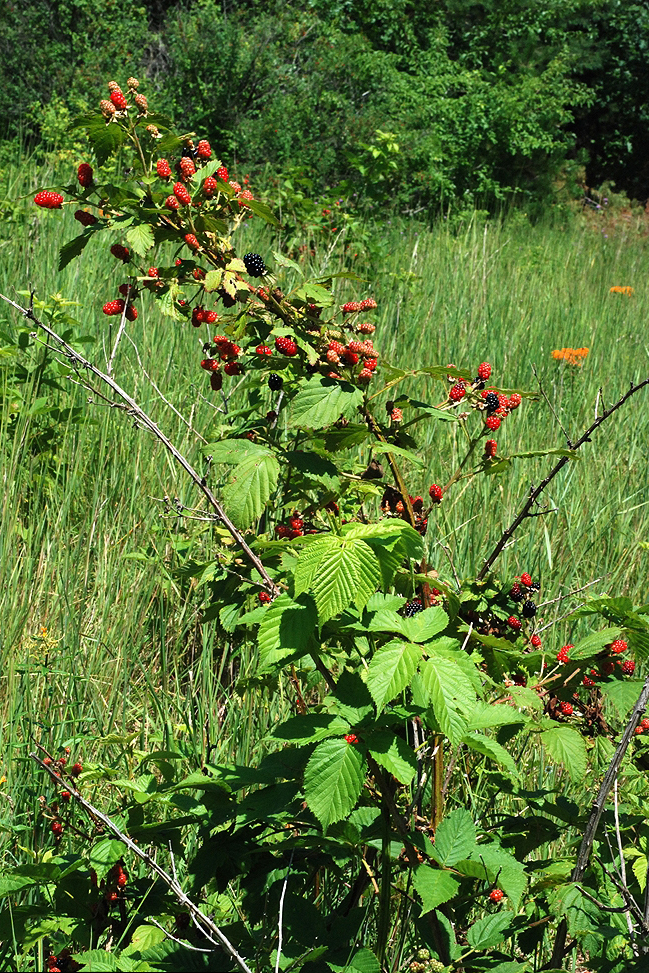

Conservation status
- Secure (NatureServe)

Scientific classification
- Kingdom: Plantae
- Clade: Tracheophytes
- Clade: Angiosperms
- Clade: Eudicots
- Clade: Rosids
- Order: Rosales
- Family: Rosaceae
- Genus: Rubus
- Subgenus: Rubus subg. Rubus
- Species: R. allegheniensis

Binomial name
- Rubus allegheniensis (Porter) Porter 1896

Synonyms
- Synonymy: Rubus villosus var. montanus Porter 1890 not Rubus montanus Lib. ex Lej. 1813; Rubus montanus (Porter) Porter 1894 not Lib. ex Lej. 1813; Rubus alleghaniensis Porter; Rubus allegheniensis var. nigrobaccus (L.H.Bailey) Farw.; Rubus allegheniensis var. plausus L.H.Bailey; Rubus allegheniensis var. populifolius Fernald; Rubus attractus L.H.Bailey; Rubus auroralis L.H.Bailey; Rubus avipes L.H.Bailey; Rubus bractealis L.H.Bailey; Rubus campestris P.J.Müll.; Rubus congruus L.H.Bailey; Rubus fissidens L.H.Bailey; Rubus floricomus Blanch.; Rubus fryei H.A.Davis & T.Davis; Rubus latens L.H.Bailey; Rubus longissimus L.H.Bailey; Rubus nigrobaccatus Focke; Rubus nigrobaccus L.H.Bailey; Rubus nigrobaccus var. sativus (L.H.Bailey) L.H.Bailey; Rubus nuperus L.H.Bailey; Rubus par L.H.Bailey; Rubus paulus L.H.Bailey; Rubus pennus L.H.Bailey; Rubus rappii L.H.Bailey; Rubus separ L.H.Bailey; Rubus villosus Aiton; Rubus villosus var. engelmannii Focke; Rubus villosus var. montanus Porter; Rubus villosus var. sativus L.H.Bailey; Rubus villosus var. villigerus Focke; Rubus gravesii (Fernald) L.H.Bailey; Rubus marilandicus L.H.Bailey; Rubus nigrobaccus var. gravesii Fernald; Rubus tumularis L.H.Bailey; Rubus uber L.H.Bailey; Rubus virginianus L.H.Bailey

= Rubus allegheniensis =

Berry and plant

Rubus allegheniensis is a North American species of highbush blackberry. It is commonly known as Allegheny blackberry.

== Description ==
The plant's characteristics can be highly variable. It is an erect bramble, typically 1.5 metres (5 feet) but occasionally over 2.4 m (8 ft) high, with single shrubs approaching 2.4 m or more wide, although it usually forms dense thickets of many plants. The leaves are alternate, compound, ovoid, and have toothed edges. The canes have many prickles, with white, 5-petal, 19-millimetre (3/4-inch) flowers in late spring and glossy, deep-violet to black, aggregate fruit in late summer.

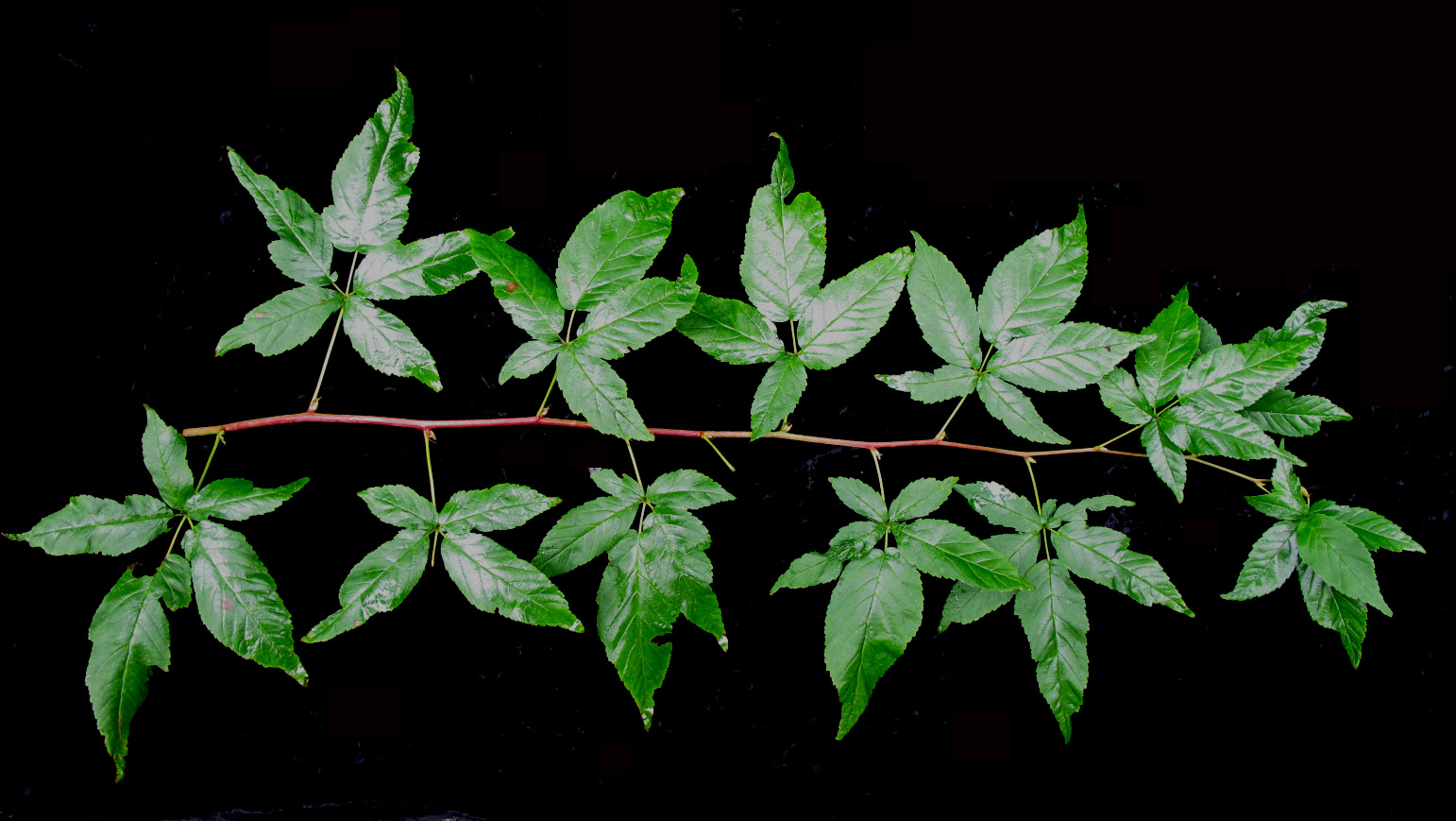
Leaves

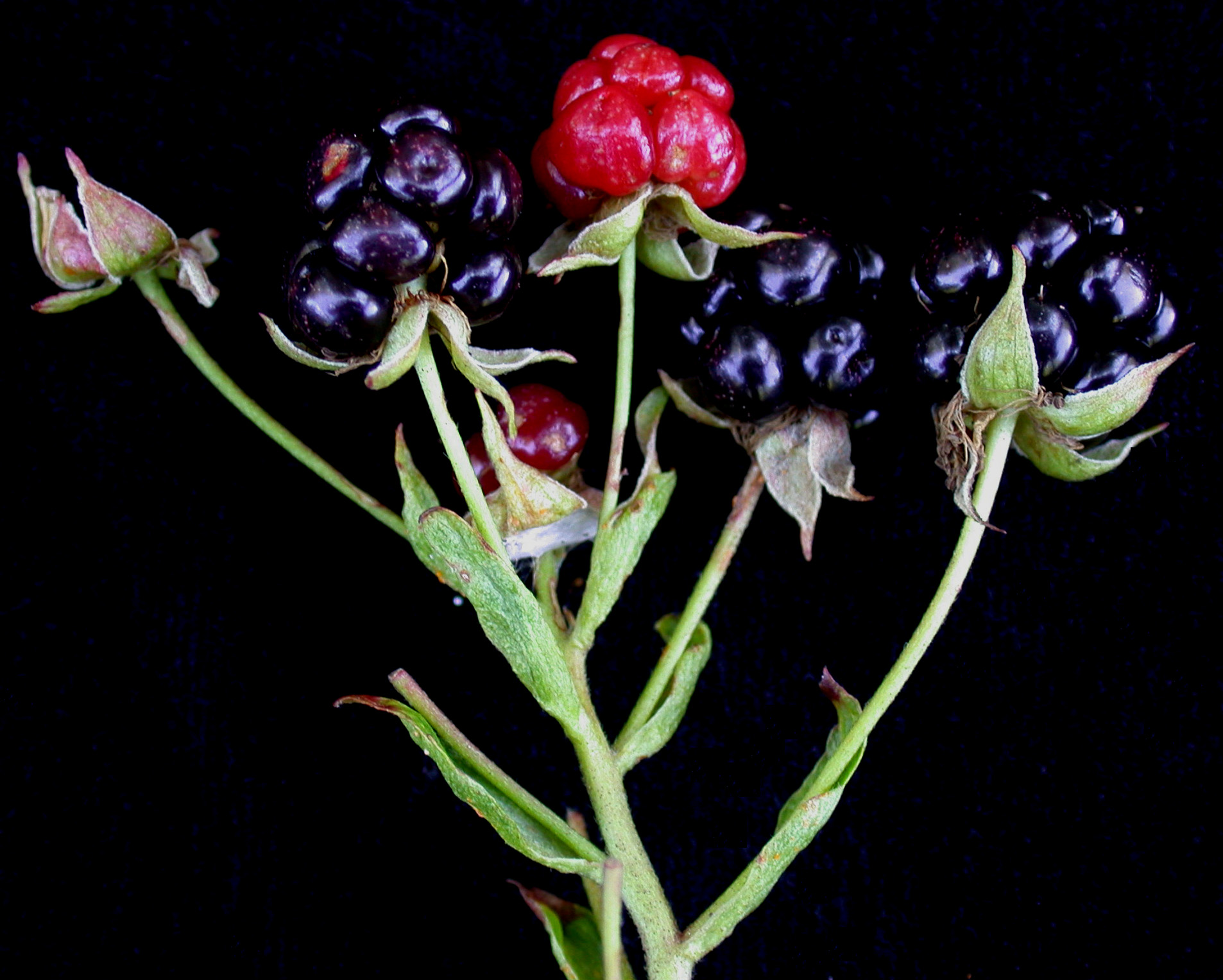
Fruits

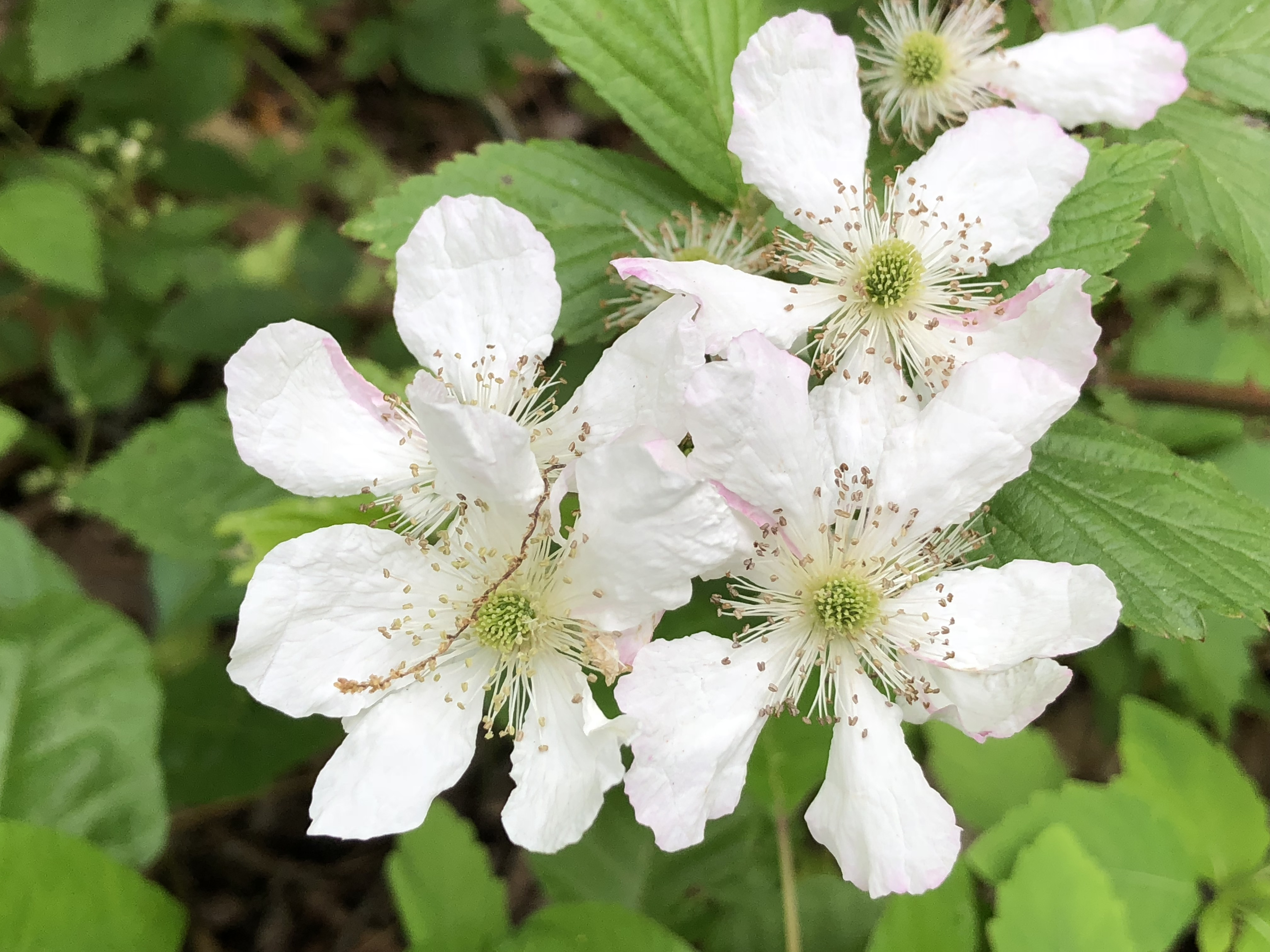
Flowers

== Taxonomy ==
R. allegheniensis is placed in section Alleghenienses of the genus Rubus (brambles), part of the rose family.

== Distribution and habitat ==
The species is very common throughout forests in eastern and central North America. It is also naturalized in a few locations in California and British Columbia. It is the most common and widespread highbush blackberry in eastern and central North America.

It is shade intolerant.

== Ecology ==
Many mammals eat the fruit, including elk, foxes, American black bears, rabbits, raccoons, opossums, squirrels, mice, and chipmunks, and deer will browse the young canes. Blackberries are also an important food source for many species of birds. The mammals and birds that eat the fruit then disperse the seed in their droppings, enabling the plant to spread to new locations. A wide variety of native bees, butterflies, beetles, flies, ants, wasps, and other insects are attracted to the nectar and pollen of the flowers; caterpillars, grasshoppers, and beetles feed on the leaves. Birds and small mammals use the thickets formed by the canes for shelter.

The presence of the species influences the dynamics of the understory vegetation of many forests in the eastern United States. An abundance of R. allegheniensis encourages new tree seedlings. Where the effects of herbivorous animals (such as whitetail deer) reduce the abundance of Allegheny blackberry, a competitor, Sitobolium punctilobulum (hay-scented fern), takes over; where S. punctilobulum becomes common, the growth of tree seedlings is restricted.

Concentrations of R. allegheniensis increase greatly after events that destroy taller shrubs and trees and thus permit more light into the understory, such as fires or widespread blowdown. These populations often decline in later years as the tree seedlings sheltered by the blackberry canes grow and reduce the amount of light reaching the lower levels.

== Uses ==
The berries are edible and nutritious. They can be eaten raw or cooked into various treats, including pies, cobblers, muffins, jellies, and jams.
