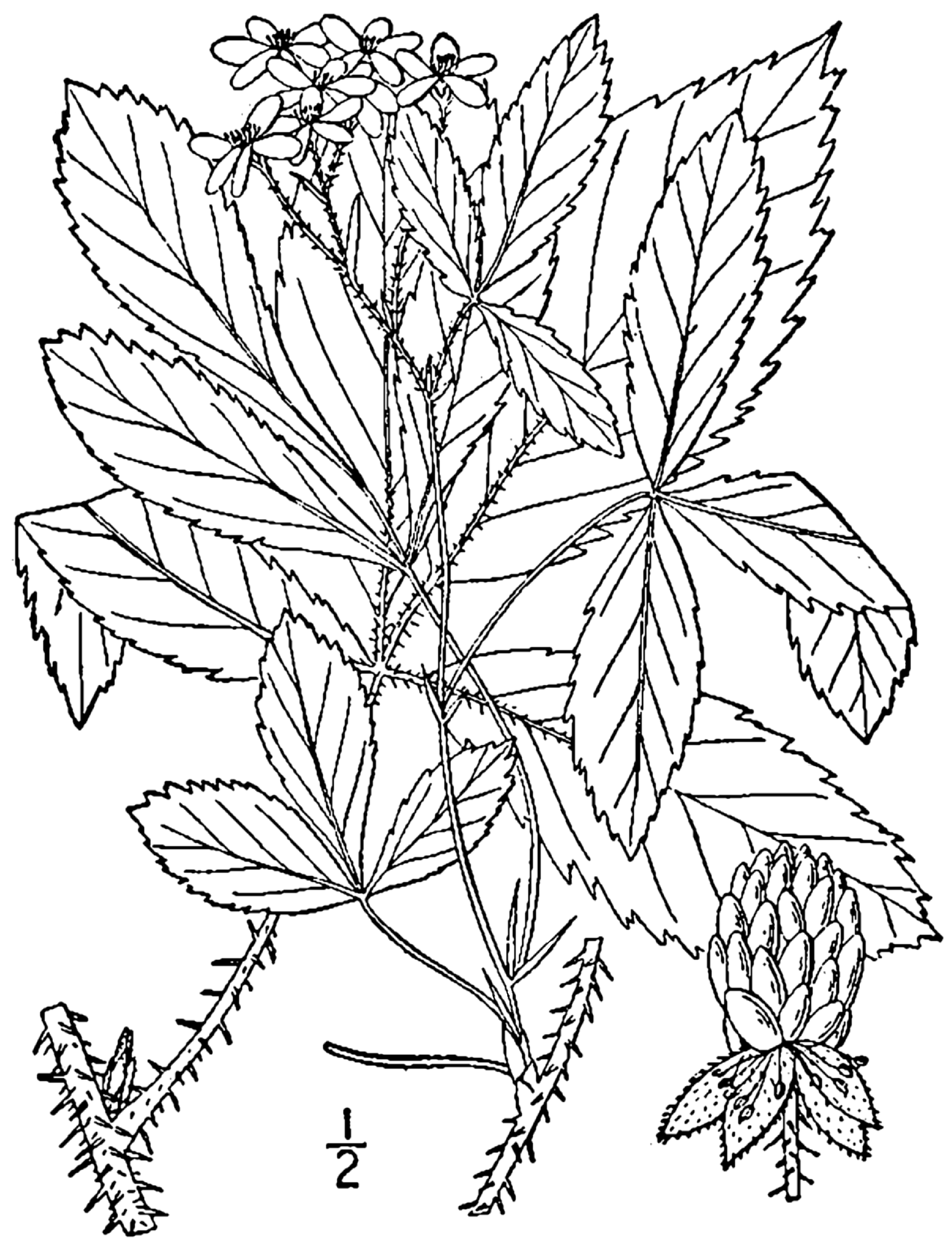

Scientific classification
- Kingdom: Plantae
- Clade: Embryophytes
- Clade: Tracheophytes
- Clade: Spermatophytes
- Clade: Angiosperms
- Clade: Eudicots
- Clade: Rosids
- Order: Rosales
- Family: Rosaceae
- Genus: Rubus
- Species: R. setosus

Binomial name
- Rubus setosus Bigelow

Synonyms
- List: Rubus apparatus L.H.Bailey; Rubus beatus L.H.Bailey; Rubus benneri L.H.Bailey; Rubus bicknellii L.H.Bailey; Rubus boottianus L.H.Bailey; Rubus condignus L.H.Bailey; Rubus deaneanus L.H.Bailey; Rubus discretus L.H.Bailey; Rubus dissensus L.H.Bailey; Rubus dissimilis L.H.Bailey; Rubus electus L.H.Bailey; Rubus exter L.H.Bailey; Rubus fulleri L.H.Bailey; Rubus groutianus Blanch.; Rubus gulosus L.H.Bailey; Rubus hispidoides L.H.Bailey; Rubus hispidus var. setosus Torr. & A.Gray; Rubus hispidus var. suberectus Peck; Rubus jejunus L.H.Bailey; Rubus junceus Blanch.; Rubus junceus var. regionalis L.H.Bailey; Rubus junior L.H.Bailey; Rubus lawrencei L.H.Bailey; Rubus malus L.H.Bailey; Rubus mediocris L.H.; Rubus navus L.H.Bailey; Rubus nigricans Rydb.; Rubus nocivus L.H.Bailey; Rubus notatus L.H.Bailey; Rubus notatus var. boreus L.H.Bailey; Rubus notatus var. ortus L.H.Bailey; Rubus oriens L.H.Bailey; Rubus ortivus (L.H.Bailey) L.H.Bailey; Rubus perdebilis L.H.Bailey; Rubus perinvisus L.H.Bailey; Rubus potis L.H.Bailey; Rubus quebecensis L.H.Bailey; Rubus racemigerus L.H.Bailey; Rubus regionalis (L.H.Bailey) L.H.Bailey; Rubus reravus L.H.Bailey; Rubus ribes L.H.Bailey; Rubus rotundior (L.H.Bailey) L.H.Bailey; Rubus schneideri L.H.Bailey; Rubus semisetosus Blanch.; Rubus semisetosus var. ortivus L.H.Bailey; Rubus semisetosus var. wheeleri L.H.Bailey; Rubus setosus var. groutianus (Blanch.) L.H.Bailey; Rubus setosus var. rotundior L.H.Bailey; Rubus significans L.H.Bailey; Rubus singulus L.H.Bailey; Rubus spectatus L.H.Bailey; Rubus stipulatus L.H.Bailey; Rubus superioris L.H.Bailey; Rubus tectus L.H.Bailey; Rubus udus L.H.Bailey; Rubus unanimus L.H.Bailey; Rubus uniformis L.H.Bailey; Rubus univocus L.H.Bailey; Rubus vermontanus Blanch.; Rubus vermontanus var. ortivus (L.H.Bailey) B.Boivin; Rubus vermontanus var. viridifolius Blanch.; Rubus viridifrons L.H.Bailey; Rubus wheeleri (L.H.Bailey) L.H.Bailey

= Rubus setosus =

Species of flowering plant

Rubus setosus, sometimes called small bristleberry, is a North American species of bramble.

== Description ==
The species is a prickly shrub up to 150 centimetres (5 feet) tall. The leaves are palmately compound with 3 or 5 leaflets. The flowers are white. The fruit are black and nearly spherical.

== Distribution and habitat ==
The species is native to the northeastern United States and adjacent areas of Canada.
