= Merritt Lyndon Fernald =

American botanist (1873–1950)

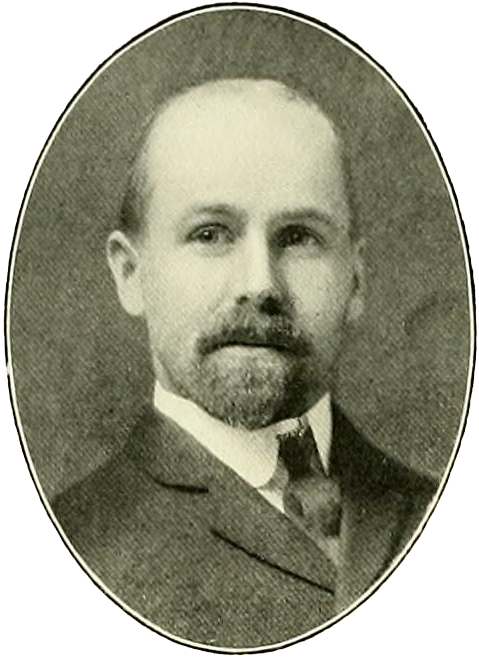
- Born: October 5, 1873; Orono, Maine
- Died: September 22, 1950 (aged 76)
- Scientific career
- Fields: Botany
- Institutions: Harvard University
- Doctoral students: Shirley Gale; Albion R. Hodgdon
- Author abbrev. (botany): Fernald

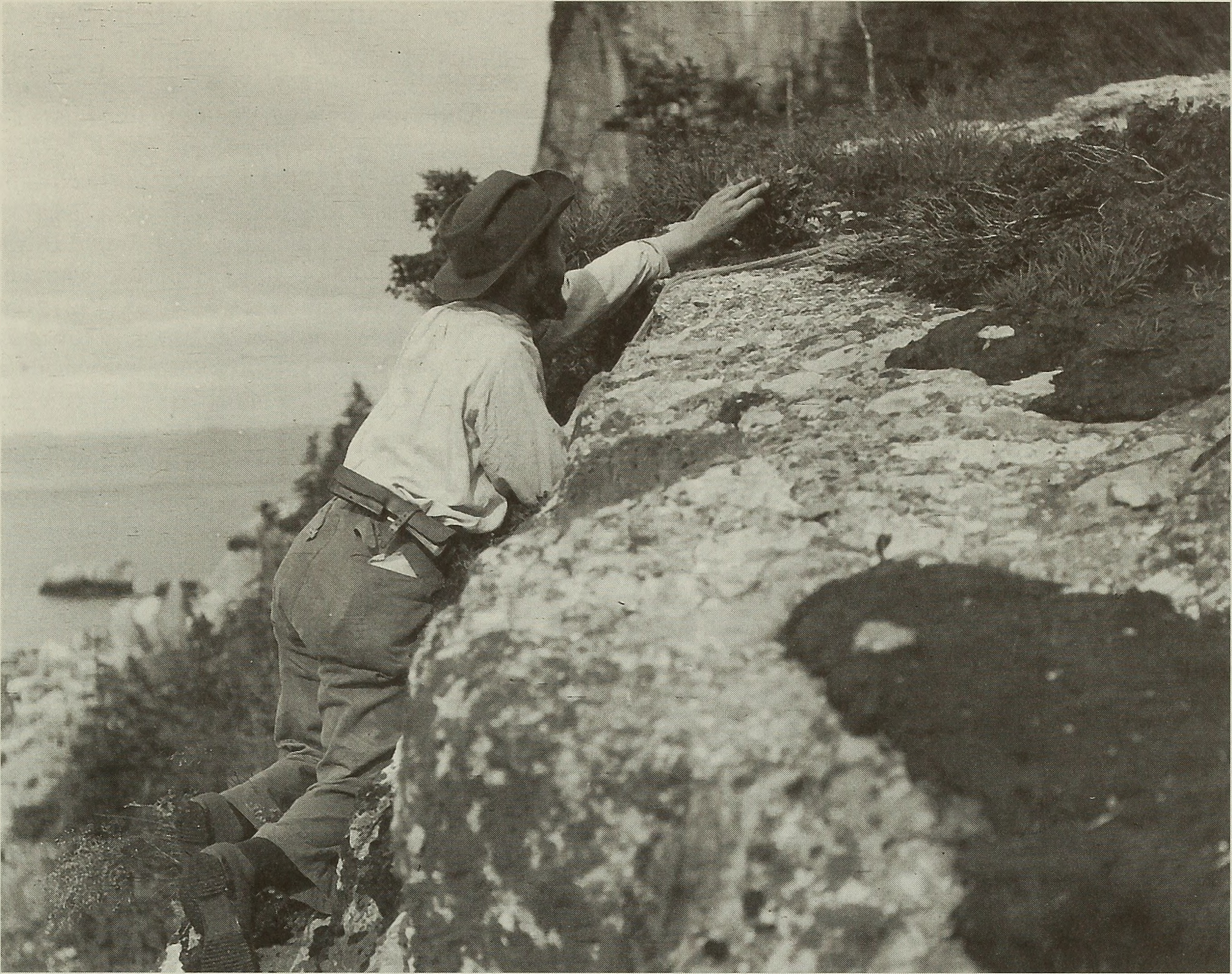
Merritt Lyndon Fernald collecting Draba aurea near Rimouski, Quebec, 1905

Merritt Lyndon Fernald (October 5, 1873 – September 22, 1950) was an American botanist. He was a respected scholar of the taxonomy and phytogeography of the vascular plant flora of temperate eastern North America. During his career, Fernald published more than 850 scientific papers and wrote and edited the seventh and eighth editions of Gray's Manual of Botany. Fernald coauthored the book Edible Wild Plants of Eastern North America in 1919–1920 with Alfred Kinsey, which was published in 1943.

== Biography ==
Fernald was born in Orono, Maine. His parents were Mary Lovejoy Heywood and Merritt Caldwell Fernald, a college professor at the University of Maine. Fernald attended Orono High School, during which time he decided that he wanted to become a botanist. He collected plants around Orono and published two botanical papers while still attending high school. Fernald attended Maine State College for a year, but began working as an assistant at the Gray Herbarium at Harvard University when he was 17. He began studying at Harvard in 1891, graduated magna cum laude in 1897, and joined the faculty at Harvard, during which time he remained active at the Herbarium. With James Franklin Collins he coedited the exsiccata work Plants of eastern Quebec, Bonaventure County (1905).

Fernald was elected to the American Academy of Arts and Sciences in 1900, the United States National Academy of Sciences in 1935, and the American Philosophical Society in 1936. Fernald was awarded the 1940 Leidy Award from the Academy of Natural Sciences of Philadelphia.

On April 15, 1907, Fernald married Margaret Howard Grant (1875–1957), in Providence, Rhode Island. She was the daughter of Henry Tyler Grant Jr. and Annie M. (Manton) Grant. They had three children: Katherine (1908–1986) Mary (1910–1927) and Henry Grant Fernald (1913–1982). The botanical artist Minna Fernald was a relative.
