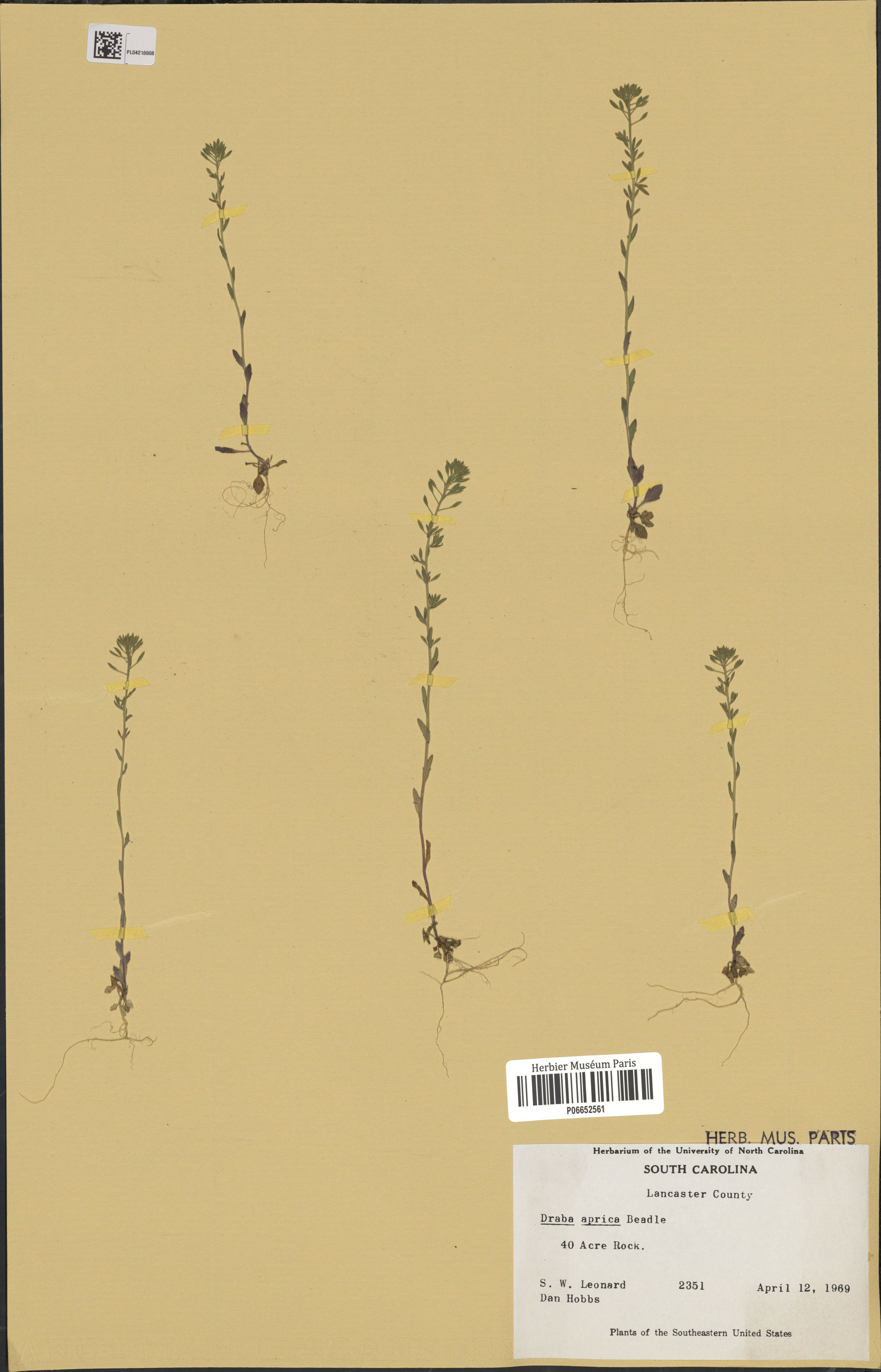

Scientific classification
- Kingdom: Plantae
- Clade: Tracheophytes
- Clade: Angiosperms
- Clade: Eudicots
- Clade: Rosids
- Order: Brassicales
- Family: Brassicaceae
- Tribe: Arabideae
- Genus: Abdra; Greene

Species
- Abdra aprica (Beadle) Al-Shehbaz, M.Koch & Jordon-Thaden; Abdra brachycarpa (Nutt.) Greene

= Abdra =

Genus of flowering plants

Abdra is a genus in the mustard family. It is found in the United States of America and contains two species, Abdra aprica and Abdra brachycarpa.

== Taxonomy ==
The genus Abdra was scientifically described and named by Edward Lee Greene in 1900. In doing so he was separating the species Abdra brachycarpa from its previous classification as part of the genus Draba. The second species, Abdra aprica, was not added to the genus until 2012 when it was also moved out of the genus Draba. It is classified as part of the family Brassicaceae and has no synonyms.
