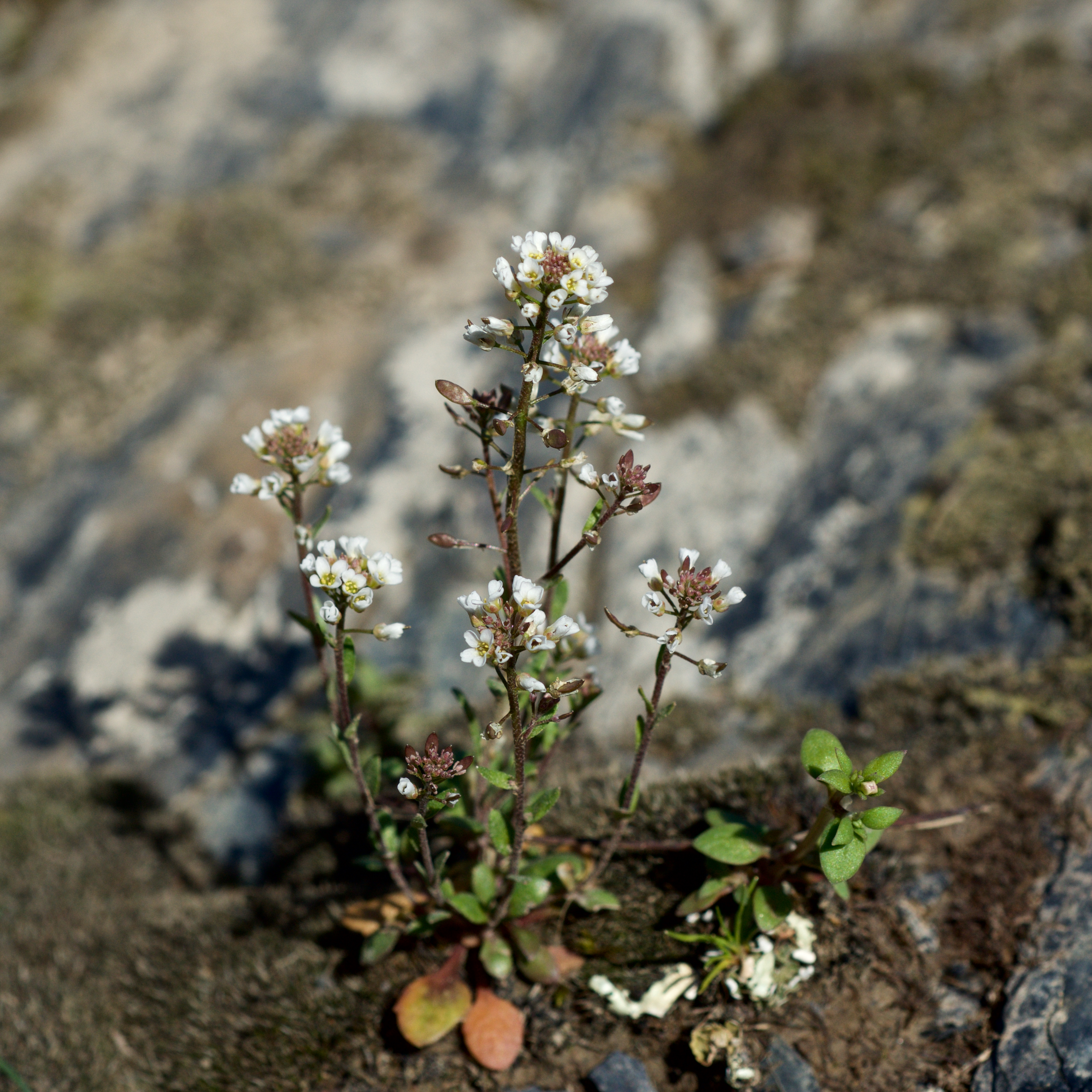

Scientific classification
- Kingdom: Plantae
- Clade: Tracheophytes
- Clade: Angiosperms
- Clade: Eudicots
- Clade: Rosids
- Order: Brassicales
- Family: Brassicaceae
- Genus: Abdra
- Species: A. brachycarpa

Binomial name
- Abdra brachycarpa (Nutt. ex Torr. & A.Gray) Greene

Synonyms
- Alyssum bidentatum Nutt.; Draba brachycarpa Nutt. ex Torr. & A.Gray

= Abdra brachycarpa =

Species of flowering plant

Abdra brachycarpa, common name shortpod draba, is a North American species of flowering plant in the family Brassicaceae. The species name brachycarpa means "bearing short fruits."

== Distribution ==
USA: AL, AR, AZ, FL, GA, IL, IN, KS, KY, LA, MO, MS, MT, NC, OH, OK, OR, SC, TN, TX, VA

== Habitat ==
Cedar glades, open fields, limestone rubble, dry to moist open soil, and waste ground.
