= List of Rubus species =

The following is a list of about 1,550 species and 69 hybrids in the flowering plant genus Rubus which are accepted by Plants of the World Online as of August 2025, minus those which are considered synonymous.

== A ==
- Rubus abchaziensis Sudre
- Rubus acanthidum Duboc & D.P.Mercier
- Rubus acanthodes (Her.Hofmann ex Focke) E.Barber
- Rubus acanthophyllos Focke
- Rubus acclivitatum W.C.R.Watson
- Rubus accrescens A.Newton
- Rubus × acer L.H.Bailey
- Rubus aciodontus Lefèvre & P.J.Müll.
- Rubus acridentulus P.J.Müll. ex Boulay
- Rubus acroglotta W.Jansen
- Rubus acuminatissimus Hassk.
- Rubus acuminatus Sm.
- Rubus acutidens (Boulay) Sudre
- Rubus acutifrons Ley
- Rubus acutipetalus Lefèvre & P.J.Müll.
- Rubus adamsii Sudre
- Rubus adenacanthus Troelstra, Meijer & A.Beek
- Rubus adenoleucus Chaboiss.
- Rubus adenomallus Focke
- Rubus adenophorus Rolfe
- Rubus adenothallus Focke
- Rubus adenotrichos Schltdl.
- Rubus adolfi-friederici Engl.
- Rubus adornatoides H.E.Weber
- Rubus adscharicus Sanadze
- Rubus adscitus Genev.
- Rubus adspersus Weihe ex H.E.Weber
- Rubus adulans A.Beek
- Rubus aenigmaticus Focke
- Rubus aequalidens A.Newton
- Rubus aethiopicus R.A.Graham
- Rubus aetnensis C.Presl
- Rubus aetnicus Weston
- Rubus affinis Weihe & Nees
- Rubus aggregatus Kaltenb.
- Rubus aghadergensis D.E.Allen
- Rubus agricastrorum A.Beek
- Rubus alaskensis L.H.Bailey
- Rubus albionis W.C.R.Watson
- Rubus alceifolius Poir.
- Rubus alexeterius Focke
- Rubus allanderi H.Hyl. ex T.Burén & H.E.Weber
- Rubus allegheniensis Porter
- Rubus almorensis Dunn
- Rubus alnifolius Rydb.
- Rubus alpestris Blume
- Rubus alpinus Macfad.
- Rubus alterniflorus P.J.Müll. & Lefèvre
- Rubus altiarcuatus W.C.Barton & Ridd.
- Rubus alumnus L.H.Bailey
- Rubus alutaceus B.L.Moreno, Casierra & Albesiano
- Rubus amabilis Focke
- Rubus amamianus Hatus. & Ohwi
- Rubus ambigens (Boulay) Boulay
- Rubus ambulans Matzke-Hajek
- Rubus amiantinus (Focke) A.Först.
- Rubus amisiensis H.E.Weber
- Rubus ammobius Buchenau & Focke
- Rubus amphichlorus P.J.Müll.
- Rubus amphidasys Focke
- Rubus amphimalacus H.E.Weber
- Rubus amphistrophos (Focke) Sabr.
- Rubus amplificatus Lees
- Rubus anas A.Beek
- Rubus andegavensis Bouvet
- Rubus andicola Focke
- Rubus anglobelgicus D.E.Allen & Vannerom
- Rubus anglofuscus Edees
- Rubus angloserpens Edees & A.Newton
- Rubus angustibracteatus T.T.Yu & L.T.Lu
- Rubus angusticuspis Sudre
- Rubus angustipaniculatus Holub
- Rubus angustisetus (Sudre) Y.Hesl.-Harr.
- Rubus anhaltianus H.E.Weber
- Rubus anisacanthopsis H.E.Weber
- Rubus anisacanthos G.Braun
- Rubus annamensis Cardot
- Rubus antecedens Ryde
- Rubus antonii (Borbás) Sabr.
- Rubus apatelus R.Keller
- Rubus apetalus Poir.
- Rubus aphananthus Walsemann ex Martensen
- Rubus aphidifer A.Beek & K.Meijer
- Rubus appropinquatus Plien.
- Rubus apricus Wimm.
- Rubus arabicus (Deflers) Schweinf.
- Rubus arachnoideus Y.C.Liu & F.Y.Lu
- Rubus archboldianus Merr. & L.M.Perry
- Rubus arcticus L.
- Rubus arduennensis Lib. ex Lej.
- Rubus × areschougii A.Blytt
- Rubus argentifrons L.H.Bailey
- Rubus argutus Link
- Rubus ariconiensis A.Newton & M.Porter
- Rubus aristisepalus (Sudre) W.C.R.Watson
- Rubus armeniacus Focke
- Rubus armipotens W.C.Barton ex A.Newton
- Rubus arrhenii (Lange) Lange
- Rubus arrheniiformis W.C.R.Watson
- Rubus arvinus Lefèvre & P.J.Müll.
- Rubus aschoffii Weihe
- Rubus asirensis D.F.Chamb.
- Rubus asperidens Sudre ex Bouvet
- Rubus assamensis Focke
- Rubus × astarae Gilli
- Rubus atrebatum A.Newton
- Rubus atrichantherus E.H.L.Krause
- Rubus atroroseus M.Lepší, P.Lepší & Velebil
- Rubus atrovinosus H.E.Weber
- Rubus atrovirens P.J.Müll.
- Rubus aurantiacus Focke
- Rubus aureolus Allander
- Rubus aurora A.Beek, Bijlsma & F.M.Mull.
- Rubus australis G.Forst.
- Rubus austromoravicus Holub
- Rubus austrosinensis Huan C.Wang
- Rubus austroslovacus Trávn.
- Rubus austrotibetanus T.T.Yu & L.T.Lu
- Rubus avaloniensis A.Newton & R.D.Randall
- Rubus axillaris Weihe ex Lej. & Courtois
- Rubus azuayensis Romol.

== B ==
- Rubus × babae Naruh.
- Rubus babingtonianus W.C.R.Watson
- Rubus babingtonii T.B.Salter
- Rubus bagnallianus Edees
- Rubus bakerianus W.C.Barton & Ridd.
- Rubus balticus (Focke) E.H.L.Krause
- Rubus bambusarum Focke
- Rubus banghamii Merr.
- Rubus barberi H.E.Weber
- Rubus × barkeri Cockayne
- Rubus baronicus A.Beek
- Rubus barrandienicus Holub & Palek
- Rubus bartonianus M.Peck
- Rubus bartonii A.Newton
- Rubus batos-weberi G.H.Loos
- Rubus bavaricus (Focke) Utsch
- Rubus beccarii Focke
- Rubus benguetensis Elmer
- Rubus bercheriensis (Druce ex W.M.Rogers) W.M.Rogers
- Rubus × bergianus A.Beek
- Rubus bertramii G.Braun
- Rubus betckei T.Marsson
- Rubus betonicifolius Focke
- Rubus bicolor Opiz
- Rubus biflorus Buch.-Ham. ex Sm.
- Rubus × biformispinus Blanch.
- Rubus bifrons Vest
- Rubus biloensis A.Newton & M.Porter
- Rubus × binatus H.Lindb.
- Rubus birmanicus Hook.f.
- Rubus blepharoneurus Cardot
- Rubus bloxamianus Coleman ex Purchas
- Rubus bloxamii (Bab.) Lees
- Rubus bochumensis G.H.Loos
- Rubus bogotensis Kunth
- Rubus bohemiicola Holub & Palek ex Holub
- Rubus bohemopolonicus Trávn. & Ziel.
- Rubus boliviensis Focke
- Rubus bollei Focke
- Rubus bombycinus Matzke-Hajek
- Rubus bonatianus Focke
- Rubus boninensis Koidz.
- Rubus bonus-henricus Matzke-Hajek
- Rubus boraeanus Genev.
- Rubus boreofrisicus Drenckh. & H.E.Weber
- Rubus botryeros (Focke ex W.M.Rogers) W.M.Rogers
- Rubus boudiccae A.L.Bull & Edees
- Rubus bovinus A.Beek & H.E.Weber
- Rubus × boyntonii Ashe
- Rubus bracteatus Boreau
- Rubus bracteosus Weihe ex Lej. & Courtois
- Rubus braeuckeri G.Braun
- Rubus braeuckeriformis H.E.Weber
- Rubus brasiliensis Mart.
- Rubus brdensis Holub
- Rubus breconensis W.C.R.Watson
- Rubus bregutiensis A.Kern. ex Focke
- Rubus brevipetiolatus T.T.Yu & L.T.Lu
- Rubus brevistaminosus Edees & A.Newton
- Rubus briareus Focke
- Rubus brigantinus Samp.
- Rubus briggsianus (W.M.Rogers) W.M.Rogers
- Rubus britannicus W.M.Rogers
- Rubus brunneri W.Maurer
- Rubus buchtienii Focke
- Rubus bucknallii J.W.White
- Rubus buergeri Miq.
- Rubus buescherianus G.H.Loos
- Rubus buhnensis (G.Braun ex Focke) G.Braun
- Rubus bullatus Rusby
- Rubus burkillii Rolfe

== C ==
- Rubus cacoeimon A.Beek
- Rubus caeresiensis Sudre & Grav.
- Rubus caesarius D.E.Allen
- Rubus caesius L.
- Rubus caflischii Focke
- Rubus calcareus P.J.Müll.
- Rubus × calopalmatus Naruh. & H.Masaki
- Rubus calophyllus C.B.Clarke
- Rubus calotemnus A.Beek
- Rubus calvatus Lees ex A.Bloxam
- Rubus calviformis H.E.Weber
- Rubus calvus H.E.Weber
- Rubus calycacanthus H.Lév.
- Rubus calycinoides Kuntze
- Rubus calycinus Wall. ex D.Don
- Rubus calyculatus Kaltenb.
- Rubus cambrensis W.C.R.Watson
- Rubus campaniensis Winkel ex A.Beek
- Rubus camptostachys G.Braun
- Rubus canadensis L.
- Rubus canaliculatus P.J.Müll.
- Rubus canduliger Bijlsma & Haveman
- Rubus canescens DC.
- Rubus caninitergi H.E.Weber
- Rubus cantabrigiensis A.L.Bull & A.C.Leslie
- Rubus canterburiensis Edees
- Rubus cantianus (W.C.R.Watson) Edees & A.Newton
- Rubus capitulatus Utsch
- Rubus capricollensis (Sprib.) Sprib.
- Rubus cardiophyllus Lefèvre & P.J.Müll.
- Rubus carduelis Matzke-Hajek
- Rubus carpetanus Vicente Orell. & A.Galán
- Rubus cartalinicus Juz.
- Rubus castellarnaui Pau
- Rubus × castoreus (Laest.) Fr.
- Rubus castroviejoi Mon.-Huelin
- Rubus caucasicus Focke
- Rubus caucasigenus (Sudre) Juz.
- Rubus caudatisepalus Calderón
- Rubus caudifolius Wuzhi
- Rubus cavatifolius P.J.Müll. ex Boulay
- Rubus celticus A.Newton
- Rubus centrobohemicus Holub
- Rubus ceratifolius A.Beek
- Rubus cerdicii D.E.Allen
- Rubus ceticus Halácsy
- Rubus chaerophylloides Sprib.
- Rubus chaerophyllus Sagorski & W.Schultze
- Rubus chaetophorus Cardot
- Rubus chamaemorus L.
- Rubus chambicus Rolfe
- Rubus chapmanianus Kupicha
- Rubus charadzeae Sanadze
- Rubus chaumazellensis Duboc & D.P.Mercier
- Rubus chenonii Sudre
- Rubus chevalieri Cardot
- Rubus chiliadenus Focke
- Rubus chingii Hu
- Rubus chloocladus W.C.R.Watson
- Rubus chloophyllus Sudre
- Rubus chloranthus (Sabr.) Fritsch
- Rubus chlorostachys P.J.Müll.
- Rubus chlorothyrsos Focke
- Rubus choachiensis A.Berger
- Rubus christiansenorum H.E.Weber
- Rubus chroosepalus Focke
- Rubus chrysobotrys Hand.-Mazz.
- Rubus chrysocarpus Mund ex Cham. & Schltdl.
- Rubus chrysogaeus P.Royen
- Rubus chrysophyllus Reinw. ex Miq.
- Rubus chrysoxylon (W.M.Rogers) W.M.Rogers
- Rubus cimbricus Focke
- Rubus cinclidodictyus Cardot
- Rubus cinerascens Weihe ex Lej. & Courtois
- Rubus cinerosiformis Rilstone
- Rubus cinerosus W.M.Rogers
- Rubus circipanicus E.H.L.Krause
- Rubus cissburiensis W.C.Barton & Ridd.
- Rubus cissoides A.Cunn.
- Rubus clementis Merr.
- Rubus clinocephalus Focke
- Rubus clusii Borbás
- Rubus coccinatus K.Meijer
- Rubus cochinchinensis Tratt.
- Rubus cochlearis Matzke-Hajek
- Rubus cockburnianus Hemsl.
- Rubus collicola (Sudre) Bouvet
- Rubus × collinus DC.
- Rubus columellaris Tutcher
- Rubus compactus Benth.
- Rubus conchyliatus Focke
- Rubus condensatiformis H.E.Weber
- Rubus condensatus P.J.Müll.
- Rubus conduplicatus Duthie ex J.H.Veitch
- Rubus confertiflorus W.C.R.Watson
- Rubus confusidens H.E.Weber
- Rubus conjungens (Bab.) W.M.Rogers
- Rubus conothyrsoides H.E.Weber
- Rubus conspectus Genev.
- Rubus conspersus W.C.R.Watson
- Rubus conspicuus P.J.Müll. ex Wirtg.
- Rubus constrictus Lefèvre & P.J.Müll.
- Rubus contritidens A.Beek & K.Meijer
- Rubus coombensis Rilstone
- Rubus cooperi D.G.Long
- Rubus copelandii Merr.
- Rubus corbierei Boulay
- Rubus corchorifolius L.f.
- Rubus cordatifolius (W.M.Rogers ex Ridd.) D.E.Allen
- Rubus cordatiformis (Neuman) Ryde
- Rubus cordiformis H.E.Weber & Martensen
- Rubus coreanus Miq.
- Rubus coriaceus Poir.
- Rubus coriifolius Liebm.
- Rubus cornubiensis (W.M.Rogers ex Ridd.) Rilstone
- Rubus coronatus Boulay
- Rubus correctispinosus H.E.Weber
- Rubus costaricanus Liebm.
- Rubus costifolius A.Först.
- Rubus cotteswoldensis W.C.Barton & Ridd.
- Rubus couchii Rilstone ex D.E.Allen
- Rubus crassidens H.E.Weber
- Rubus crataegifolius Bunge
- Rubus crepinii Sudre
- Rubus crespignyanus W.C.R.Watson
- Rubus creticus Tourn. ex L.
- Rubus criniger (E.F.Linton) W.M.Rogers
- Rubus crispomarginatus Holub
- Rubus crispus Lefèvre & P.J.Müll.
- Rubus croceacanthus H.Lév.
- Rubus crudelis W.C.R.Watson
- Rubus cryptopetalus A.Beek
- Rubus ctenodon (Sabr.) Fritsch
- Rubus cubirianus (H.E.Weber) G.H.Loos
- Rubus cuifengensis S.S.Ying
- Rubus cumbrensis A.Newton
- Rubus cumingii Kuntze
- Rubus cuneifolius Pursh
- Rubus cupanianus Guss.
- Rubus curvaciculatus Walsemann ex H.E.Weber
- Rubus curvispinosus Edees & A.Newton
- Rubus cuspidatoides W.Jansen
- Rubus cuspidatus P.J.Müll.
- Rubus cuspidiferus P.J.Müll. & Lefèvre
- Rubus cyanophyllus W.Jansen & H.Grossh.
- Rubus × cyclomorphus H.E.Weber
- Rubus cyclops Mon.-Huelin
- Rubus cymosus Rydb.
- Rubus cyri Juz.
- Rubus czarnunensis (Sprib.) Sprib.

== D ==
- Rubus dahmsianus G.H.Loos
- Rubus darssensis Henker & Kiesew.
- Rubus dasycarpus (Sabr.) Sabr.
- Rubus dasyphyllus (W.M.Rogers) E.S.Marshall
- Rubus daveyi Rilstone
- Rubus dechenii Wirtg.
- Rubus decumbens Thunb.
- Rubus decurrentispinus H.E.Weber
- Rubus decussatiformis P.D.Sell
- Rubus dejonghii A.Beek
- Rubus delabathiensis Gust.
- Rubus delavayi Franch.
- Rubus delectus P.J.Müll. & Wirtg.
- Rubus deliciosus Torr.
- Rubus dentatifolius (Briggs) W.C.R.Watson
- Rubus deodatensis J.-M.Royer & D.P.Mercier
- Rubus derasifolius (Sudre) Malinv.
- Rubus deruyveri Vannerom & E.Jacques
- Rubus desarmatus A.Beek
- Rubus dethardingii E.H.L.Krause
- Rubus devitatus Matzke-Hajek
- Rubus deweveri A.Beek
- Rubus dhauladharensis Chand.Gupta & Vik.Kumar
- Rubus dianchuanensis Huan C.Wang & Q.P.Wang
- Rubus diaphanus Plien.
- Rubus diclinis F.Muell.
- Rubus dierschkeanus H.E.Weber
- Rubus × digeneus H.Lindb.
- Rubus digitalis Plien.
- Rubus discernendus (Sudre) Sudre
- Rubus discoideus P.J.Müll.
- Rubus discolor Weihe & Nees
- Rubus dissimulans Lindeb.
- Rubus distortifolius Matzke-Hajek
- Rubus distractiformis A.Newton
- Rubus distractus P.J.Müll. ex Wirtg.
- Rubus divaricatus P.J.Müll.
- Rubus diversus W.C.R.Watson
- Rubus × dobuniensis Sudre & Ley
- Rubus doerrii H.E.Weber
- Rubus dolichocarpus Juz.
- Rubus dolichophyllus Hand.-Mazz.
- Rubus dollnensis Sprib.
- Rubus domingensis Focke
- Rubus dorcheei Rokaya & S.Subedi
- Rubus doyonensis Hand.-Mazz.
- Rubus drejeri Jensen ex Lange
- Rubus drenthicus A.Beek & K.Meijer
- Rubus drymophilus P.J.Müll. & Lefèvre
- Rubus ducatuscola G.H.Loos
- Rubus dufftianus W.Jansen
- Rubus dumetorum Weihe
- Rubus dumnoniensis Bab.
- Rubus dunensis W.M.Rogers
- Rubus dunnii F.P.Metcalf
- Rubus durospinosus W.Jansen
- Rubus durotrigum R.P.Murray
- Rubus durus C.Wright

== E ==
- Rubus eboracensis W.C.R.Watson
- Rubus ebudensis A.Newton
- Rubus echinatoides (W.M.Rogers) Dallman
- Rubus echinatus Lindl.
- Rubus echinocalyx Erichsen
- Rubus echinosepalus H.E.Weber
- Rubus eckhartii W.Jansen
- Rubus ecklonii Focke
- Rubus edeesii H.Weber & A.L.Bull
- Rubus edentulus A.Beek & Meijer
- Rubus efferatus Craib
- Rubus effertus L.H.Bailey
- Rubus effrenatus A.Newton
- Rubus eggersii (Focke) Rydb.
- Rubus eglandulosus Lefèvre & P.J.Müll.
- Rubus egregius Focke
- Rubus egregiusculus (Frid. & Gelert) E.H.L.Krause
- Rubus ehrnsbergeri H.E.Weber
- Rubus eiderianus (Frid.) H.E.Weber
- Rubus eifeliensis Wirtg.
- Rubus elatior Focke ex Gremli
- Rubus elegans P.J.Müll.
- Rubus elegantispinosus (A.Schumach.) H.E.Weber
- Rubus ellipticus Sm.
- Rubus elongatifolius Boulay & Gillot
- Rubus elongatus Sm.
- Rubus eluxatus Neuman
- Rubus emarginatus P.J.Müll.
- Rubus enslenii Tratt.
- Rubus epipsilos Focke
- Rubus erichsenii H.E.Weber
- Rubus erinulus A.Beek
- Rubus eriocarpus Liebm.
- Rubus erlangeri Engl.
- Rubus errabundus W.C.R.Watson
- Rubus erubescens Wirtg.
- Rubus erythradenes P.J.Müll.
- Rubus erythrocarpus T.T.Yu & L.T.Lu
- Rubus erythroclados Mart. ex Hook.f.
- Rubus erythrocomus G.Braun
- Rubus erythrops Edees & A.Newton
- Rubus erythrostachys (Sabr.) Halácsy
- Rubus × esfandiarii Gilli
- Rubus euanthinus W.C.R.Watson
- Rubus eucalyptus Focke
- Rubus euchloos Focke
- Rubus euryanthemus W.C.R.Watson
- Rubus eustephanos Focke
- Rubus evadens Focke
- Rubus evagatus Sudre
- Rubus evahonae Duboc & D.P.Mercier
- Rubus exarmatus H.E.Weber & W.Jansen
- Rubus exstans Walsemann & Stohr
- Rubus exsuccus Steud. ex A.Rich.

== F ==
- Rubus faberi Focke
- Rubus fabrimontanus (Sprib.) Sprib.
- Rubus fagifolius Cham. & Schltdl.
- Rubus fairholmianus Gardner
- Rubus fanjingshanensis L.T.Lu
- Rubus fasciculatiformis H.E.Weber
- Rubus fasciculatus P.J.Müll.
- Rubus favillatus A.Beek
- Rubus favonii W.C.R.Watson
- Rubus feddei H.Lév. & Vaniot
- Rubus fellatae A.Chev.
- Rubus ferdinandimuelleri Focke
- Rubus ferox Vest
- Rubus ferrezii J.-M.Royer
- Rubus ferrugineus Wikstr.
- Rubus fertilis A.Beek
- Rubus ferus (Focke) Focke
- Rubus festii H.E.Weber
- Rubus fimbrifolius P.J.Müll. & Wirtg.
- Rubus finitimus Kupcsok
- Rubus fioniae Neuman
- Rubus firmus Frid. & Gelert ex Utsch
- Rubus fissipetalus P.J.Müll.
- Rubus fissus Lindl.
- Rubus flabellatus Plien.
- Rubus flaccidifolius P.J.Müll.
- Rubus flaccidus P.J.Müll.
- Rubus flagellaris Willd.
- Rubus flagelliflorus Focke
- Rubus flavescens P.J.Müll. & Lefèvre
- Rubus × flavinanus Blanch.
- Rubus flavinervis Plien.
- Rubus flexisetus (Sudre) Prain
- Rubus floribundus Kunth
- Rubus × floricomus Blanch.
- Rubus florifolius L.H.Bailey
- Rubus flosculosus Focke
- Rubus fluvius P.D.Sell
- Rubus fockeanus Kurz
- Rubus foersteri Matzke-Hajek
- Rubus folia-convexus Duboc & D.P.Mercier
- Rubus foliaceistipulatus T.T.Yu & L.T.Lu
- Rubus foliosus Weihe
- Rubus fontium-duraniae Duboc & D.P.Mercier
- Rubus fontivagus (Sudre) Prain
- Rubus formidabilis Lefèvre & P.J.Müll.
- Rubus formosensis Kuntze
- Rubus forrestianus Hand.-Mazz.
- Rubus franchetianus H.Lév.
- Rubus franconicus H.E.Weber
- Rubus × fraseri Rehder
- Rubus fraxinifoliolus Hayata
- Rubus fraxinifolius Poir.
- Rubus friesianus H.Hyl. ex T.Mattsson & Oredsson
- Rubus friesiorum Gust.
- Rubus frieslandicus K.Meijer & A.Beek
- Rubus frisicus (Frid. ex Focke) Focke
- Rubus fritschii Sabr.
- Rubus fruticosus L.
- Rubus fuernrohrii H.E.Weber
- Rubus fujianensis T.T.Yu & L.T.Lu
- Rubus × fultiformis A.Beek
- Rubus × fultus A.Beek
- Rubus furnarius W.C.Barton & Ridd.
- Rubus furvicolor Focke
- Rubus fuscicaulis Edees
- Rubus fuscicortex Sudre
- Rubus fuscorubens Focke
- Rubus fuscoviridis Rilstone
- Rubus fuscus Weihe

== G ==
- Rubus gachetensis A.Berger
- Rubus galeatus H.E.Weber
- Rubus galloecicus Pau
- Rubus gallofuscus A.Newton & M.Porter
- Rubus gardnerianus Kuntze
- Rubus gariannensis A.L.Bull
- Rubus gayeri Király, Trávn. & Žíla
- Rubus gelertii Frid.
- Rubus geminatus H.E.Weber
- Rubus geniculatus Kaltenb.
- Rubus geoides Sm.
- Rubus georgicus Focke
- Rubus × geraniifolius Naruh. & Takano
- Rubus gerbamontensis J.-M.Royer & D.P.Mercier
- Rubus germanicus Focke ex Thomé
- Rubus geromensis P.J.Müll.
- Rubus ghanakantae R.S.Rao & J.Joseph
- Rubus glabratus Kunth
- Rubus glabricarpus W.C.Cheng
- Rubus glabrior A.Beek
- Rubus glandisepalus H.E.Weber
- Rubus glandithyrsos G.Braun
- Rubus glandulae-rarae Duboc & D.P.Mercier
- Rubus glandulifer N.P.Balakr.
- Rubus glanduliger W.C.R.Watson
- Rubus glandulosocalycinus Hayata
- Rubus glandulosocarpus M.X.Nie
- Rubus glandulosus Bellardi
- Rubus glareosus W.M.Rogers
- Rubus glaucifolius Kellogg
- Rubus glauciformis Gust. ex H.Hyl.
- Rubus glaucovirens G.Maass
- Rubus glaucus Benth.
- Rubus glivicensis (Sudre) Sprib.
- Rubus glomeratus Blume
- Rubus gloriosus A.Beek
- Rubus glossoides H.E.Weber & Stohr
- Rubus gneissogenes Sudre
- Rubus godronii Lecoq & Lamotte
- Rubus gongshanensis T.T.Yu & L.T.Lu
- Rubus goniophorus H.E.Weber
- Rubus goniophyllus P.J.Müll. & Lefèvre
- Rubus gothicus Frid. & Gelert
- Rubus grabowskii Weihe ex Günther, Grab. & Wimm.
- Rubus gracilis J.Presl & C.Presl
- Rubus graecensis W.Maurer
- Rubus grandiflorus Kaltenb.
- Rubus grandipaniculatus T.T.Yu & L.T.Lu
- Rubus grandruptensis J.-M.Royer & D.P.Mercier
- Rubus × grantii Gilli
- Rubus granulatus Lefèvre & P.J.Müll.
- Rubus gratiosus P.J.Müll. & Lefèvre
- Rubus gratus Focke
- Rubus gravetii (Boulay) W.C.R.Watson
- Rubus grayanus Maxim.
- Rubus gregarioides Plien.
- Rubus gregarius Plien.
- Rubus gremlii Focke
- Rubus gressittii F.P.Metcalf
- Rubus griesiae H.E.Weber
- Rubus griffithianus W.M.Rogers
- Rubus griffithii Hook.f.
- Rubus grisebachii (Focke) Focke
- Rubus grypoacanthus Lefèvre & P.J.Müll.
- Rubus guentheri Weihe
- Rubus guestphalicoides H.E.Weber
- Rubus guestphalicus (Focke) Utsch
- Rubus gunnianus Hook.
- Rubus guttiferus Trávn. & Holub
- Rubus guyanensis Focke
- Rubus gyamdaensis L.T.Lu & Boufford
- Rubus gymnocarpus Boulay & Pierrat

== H ==
- Rubus hadracanthos (G.Braun) G.Braun
- Rubus hadrocarpus Standl. & Steyerm.
- Rubus haesitans Mart. & Walsemann
- Rubus haeupleri H.E.Weber
- Rubus haitiensis L.H.Bailey
- Rubus hakonensis Franch. & Sav.
- Rubus hallandicus (Gabr. ex F.Aresch.) Neuman
- Rubus halsteadensis W.C.R.Watson
- Rubus hamiltonii Hook.f.
- Rubus hanceanus Kuntze
- Rubus hantonensis D.E.Allen
- Rubus hapoliensis G.D.Pal
- Rubus hartmanii Gand.
- Rubus hasbaniensis Vannerom
- Rubus hassicus H.E.Weber
- Rubus hasskarlii Miq.
- Rubus hastifer H.E.Weber
- Rubus hastifolius H.Lév. & Vaniot
- Rubus hastiformis W.C.R.Watson
- Rubus hatsushimae Koidz.
- Rubus hawaiensis A.Gray
- Rubus hebecarpos P.J.Müll.
- Rubus hebes Boulay & Lucand
- Rubus hebridensis Edees
- Rubus helgae G.H.Loos
- Rubus hemithyrsus Hand.-Mazz.
- Rubus henkeri H.E.Weber & Kiesew.
- Rubus henrici-egonis Holub
- Rubus henrici-weberi A.Beek
- Rubus henriquesii Samp.
- Rubus henryi Hemsl. & Kuntze
- Rubus hercynicus G.Braun
- Rubus herzogii Focke
- Rubus hesperius W.M.Rogers
- Rubus heterobelus Sudre
- Rubus heterophyllus Willd.
- Rubus heterosepalus Merr.
- Rubus hevellicus (E.H.L.Krause) E.H.L.Krause
- Rubus hexagynus Roxb. ex Wall.
- Rubus hibernicus (W.M.Rogers) W.M.Rogers
- Rubus hilsianus H.E.Weber
- Rubus hindii A.L.Bull
- Rubus × hiraseanus Makino
- Rubus hirsutior Fitschen ex H.E.Weber
- Rubus hirsutus Thunb.
- Rubus hirtifolius P.J.Müll. & Wirtg.
- Rubus hispidus L.
- Rubus histriculus H.E.Weber
- Rubus histrionicus Plien.
- Rubus hobroensis A.Pedersen & Schou
- Rubus hochstetterorum Seub.
- Rubus hoffmeisterianus Kunth & C.D.Bouché
- Rubus hohuanshanensis S.S.Ying
- Rubus holandrei P.J.Müll.
- Rubus holerythros Focke
- Rubus holochlous (Sudre) Sudre
- Rubus holosericeus Vest
- Rubus holtenii Kuntze
- Rubus holzfuszii Sprib.
- Rubus hoplotheca A.Beek & D.P.Mercier
- Rubus horrefactus P.J.Müll. & Lefèvre
- Rubus horridicaulis P.J.Müll.
- Rubus horridifolius K.Meijer & A.Beek
- Rubus horridus Schultz
- Rubus horripilus Lefèvre & P.J.Müll.
- Rubus hostilis P.J.Müll. & Wirtg.
- Rubus howii Merr. & Chun
- Rubus huagaoxiensis X.F.Gao, W.B.Ju & X.H.Xiong
- Rubus huangpingensis T.T.Yu & L.T.Lu
- Rubus humistratus Steud.
- Rubus humulifolius C.A.Mey.
- Rubus hybridus Vill.
- Rubus hylanderi Martensen & A.Pedersen
- Rubus hylocharis W.C.R.Watson
- Rubus hylonomus Lefèvre & P.J.Müll.
- Rubus hylophilus Ripart ex Genev.
- Rubus hypomalacus Focke
- Rubus hypopitys Focke
- Rubus hyrcanus Juz.
- Rubus hystricopsis (Frid.) Å.Gust.

== I ==
- Rubus ibericus Juz.
- Rubus iceniensis A.Newton & H.E.Weber
- Rubus ichangensis Hemsl. & Kuntze
- Rubus idaeifolius Thuan
- Rubus × idaeoides Ruthe
- Rubus idaeopsis Focke
- Rubus idaeus L.
- Rubus ignoratus H.E.Weber
- Rubus ikenoensis H.Lév. & Vaniot
- Rubus illecebrosus Focke
- Rubus imbellis Matzke-Hajek
- Rubus imbricatus Hort
- Rubus imitans H.E.Weber
- Rubus × immanis Ashe
- Rubus immodicus A.Schumach. ex H.E.Weber
- Rubus imperialis Cham. & Schltdl.
- Rubus impressinervus F.P.Metcalf
- Rubus incanescens (DC.) Bertol.
- Rubus incarnatus P.J.Müll.
- Rubus incisior H.E.Weber
- Rubus incurvatiformis Edees
- Rubus incurvatus Bab.
- Rubus indicissus Focke
- Rubus indicus Thunb.
- Rubus indusiatus Focke
- Rubus indutus Boulay & Vendrely
- Rubus inedulis Rolfe
- Rubus infestior Edees
- Rubus infestisepalus Edees & A.Newton
- Rubus infestus Weihe
- Rubus informifolius Edees
- Rubus infrarugosus (Sudre) Prain
- Rubus inhorrens (Focke) Holzfuss
- Rubus innominatus S.Moore
- Rubus inopacatus P.J.Müll. & Lefèvre
- Rubus inopertus (Focke) Focke
- Rubus insectifolius Lefèvre & P.J.Müll.
- Rubus insericatus P.J.Müll. ex Wirtg.
- Rubus insignis Hook.f.
- Rubus insolatus P.J.Müll.
- Rubus insulariopsis H.E.Weber
- Rubus insularis F.Aresch.
- Rubus integribasis P.J.Müll. ex Boulay
- Rubus intensior Edees
- Rubus intercurrens Gust.
- Rubus intermittens F.Bolle
- Rubus intricatus P.J.Müll.
- Rubus irasuensis Liebm.
- Rubus irenaeus Focke
- Rubus iricus W.M.Rogers
- Rubus iringanus Gust.
- Rubus irritans Focke
- Rubus iscanus A.Newton & M.Porter
- Rubus ischyracanthus Cardot

== J ==
- Rubus jamaicensis L.
- Rubus jambosoides Hance
- Rubus jansenii H.E.Weber
- Rubus jarae-cimrmanii M.Lepší, P.Lepší, Trávn. & Žíla
- Rubus jianensis L.T.Lu & Boufford
- Rubus jinfoshanensis T.T.Yu & L.T.Lu
- Rubus jingningensis Z.H.Chen, Feng Chen & F.G.Zhang
- Rubus josefianus H.E.Weber
- Rubus josholubii H.E.Weber
- Rubus juennensis Leute & W.Maurer
- Rubus juvenis A.Beek
- Rubus juzepczukii Sanadze

== K ==
- Rubus kacheticus Sanadze
- Rubus × kajikumaichigo Naruh.
- Rubus × kamiakae Naruh.
- Rubus × karakalensis Freyn
- Rubus kawakamii Hayata
- Rubus kaznowskii Kosiński & Ziel.
- Rubus keleterios P.Royen
- Rubus keniensis Standl.
- Rubus × kenoensis Koidz.
- Rubus ketzkhovelii Sanadze
- Rubus khasianus Cardot
- Rubus kiesewetteri Henker
- Rubus killipii A.Berger
- Rubus kingaensis Engl.
- Rubus kirungensis Engl.
- Rubus kisoensis Nakai
- Rubus kletensis M.Lepší & P.Lepší
- Rubus klimmekianus Matzke-Hajek
- Rubus × knappianus A.Spiers & J.D.Arm.
- Rubus koehleri Weihe
- Rubus kolmariensis (Sprib.) A.Beek
- Rubus kudagorensis Sanadze
- Rubus kuleszae Ziel.
- Rubus kumaonensis N.P.Balakr.
- Rubus × kupcokianus Borbás ex Kupcsok
- Rubus kwangsiensis H.L.Li

== L ==
- Rubus laciniatus Willd.
- Rubus laconensis Camarda
- Rubus lacustris W.M.Rogers
- Rubus laegaardii Romol.
- Rubus laetus E.F.Linton
- Rubus laevicaulis A.Beek
- Rubus lagerbergii Lindeb.
- Rubus lahidjanensis Rech.f.
- Rubus lainzii H.E.Weber
- Rubus lambertianus Ser.
- Rubus lamburnensis Rilstone
- Rubus lamprocaulos G.Braun
- Rubus lanaticaulis Edees & A.Newton
- Rubus landoltii H.E.Weber
- Rubus langankianus G.H.Loos
- Rubus langei Jensen ex Frid. & Gelert
- Rubus lanicoccus Plien.
- Rubus lanuginosus Steven ex Ser.
- Rubus lanyuensis Hung T.Chang
- Rubus largificus W.C.R.Watson
- Rubus lasiandrus H.E.Weber
- Rubus lasioclados (Focke) A.Först.
- Rubus lasiococcus A.Gray
- Rubus lasiodermis Sudre
- Rubus lasiostylus Focke
- Rubus lasiotrichos Focke
- Rubus latiarcuatus W.C.R.Watson
- Rubus latifolius Bab.
- Rubus latior A.Beek
- Rubus latisedes Meierott
- Rubus latoauriculatus F.P.Metcalf
- Rubus laudatus A.Berger
- Rubus laxiflorus P.J.Müll. & Lefèvre
- Rubus lechleri Focke
- Rubus leightonii Lees ex Leight.
- Rubus leiningeri W.Lang
- Rubus lentianus Hohla, Király, M.Lepší & P.Lepší
- Rubus lentiginosus Lees
- Rubus lepidulus (Sudre) Juz.
- Rubus leptodytus A.Beek
- Rubus leptostelechus A.Beek
- Rubus leptostemon Juz.
- Rubus leptothyrsos G.Braun
- Rubus lesdainii Sudre ex Gand.
- Rubus lettii W.M.Rogers
- Rubus leucacanthus Posp.
- Rubus leucandriformis Edees & A.Newton
- Rubus leucandrus Focke
- Rubus leucanthus Hance
- Rubus leuciscanus E.H.L.Krause
- Rubus leucocarpus Arn.
- Rubus leucodermis (Douglas ex Hook.) Douglas ex Torr. & A.Gray
- Rubus leucophaeus P.J.Müll.
- Rubus leucostachys Schleich. ex Sm.
- Rubus leyanus W.M.Rogers
- Rubus lianos A.Beek, R.Berkhout, Haveman & De Ronde
- Rubus libertianus Weihe ex Lej. & Courtois
- Rubus lichuanensis T.T.Yu & L.T.Lu
- Rubus lictorum Plien.
- Rubus lidforssii (Gelert) Lange
- Rubus liebmannii Focke
- Rubus lignicensis Figert
- Rubus lilacinus Wirtg.
- Rubus limbarae Camarda
- Rubus limitaneus Maliński & Ziel.
- Rubus limitis Matzke-Hajek & H.Grossh.
- Rubus lindebergii P.J.Müll.
- Rubus lindleyanus Lees
- Rubus linearifoliolus Hayata
- Rubus lineatus Reinw. ex Blume
- Rubus lingtianus X.H.Xiong & X.F.Gao
- Rubus lishuiensis T.T.Yu & L.T.Lu
- Rubus liubensis W.Maurer
- Rubus liui Yuen P.Yang & S.Y.Lu
- Rubus lividus G.Braun
- Rubus lobatidens H.E.Weber & Stohr
- Rubus lobaviensis F.W.Sander
- Rubus lobifolius Trávn. & Király
- Rubus lobophyllus C.T.Shih ex F.P.Metcalf
- Rubus loehrii Wirtg.
- Rubus lohfauensis F.P.Metcalf
- Rubus loirensis T.Huang
- Rubus londinensis (W.M.Rogers) W.C.R.Watson
- Rubus longepedicellatus (Gust.) C.H.Stirt.
- Rubus longicrus Bijlsma & A.Beek
- Rubus longiflorus D.Welch
- Rubus longistipularis Espinel-Ortiz & Romol.
- Rubus longithyrsiger Lees ex Focke
- Rubus longus (W.M.Rogers & Ley) A.Newton
- Rubus loosii H.E.Weber
- Rubus lorentzianus Pulle
- Rubus loretianus (Sudre) Fedde & C.Schust.
- Rubus louettensis (Sudre & Grav.) Prain
- Rubus lowii Stapf
- Rubus loxensis Benth.
- Rubus lucens Focke
- Rubus lucensis H.E.Weber & Mon.-Huelin
- Rubus lucentifolius Ziel. & Kosiński
- Rubus luchunensis T.T.Yu & L.T.Lu
- Rubus lucidicaulis A.Beek
- Rubus lucrosus W.Jansen
- Rubus ludensis W.C.R.Watson
- Rubus ludwigii Eckl. & Zeyh.
- Rubus lugubris Plien.
- Rubus luminosus Martensen
- Rubus lumnitzeri (Sabr.) Fritsch
- Rubus lupiarboris Duboc & D.P.Mercier
- Rubus lusaticus Rostock
- Rubus luticola A.Beek
- Rubus luxurians Ripart ex Genev.
- Rubus luzoniensis Merr.

== M ==
- Rubus maassii Focke ex Bertram
- Rubus macer H.E.Weber
- Rubus macescens Plien.
- Rubus macgregorii F.Muell.
- Rubus macilentus Cambess.
- Rubus macraei A.Gray
- Rubus macranthelos T.Marsson
- Rubus macrodontus P.J.Müll.
- Rubus macrogongylus Focke
- Rubus macropetalus Douglas ex Hook.
- Rubus macrophyllus Weihe & Nees
- Rubus macrostachys P.J.Müll.
- Rubus macrostemonides Fritsch
- Rubus macrothyrsus Lange
- Rubus macvaughianus Rzed. & Calderón
- Rubus madagascarius Gust.
- Rubus maershanensis Huan C.Wang & H.Sun
- Rubus magnidentatus F.W.Sander
- Rubus magnisepalus K.Meijer
- Rubus majusculus (Sudre) Sudre
- Rubus malagassus Focke
- Rubus malifolius Focke
- Rubus malipoensis T.T.Yu & L.T.Lu
- Rubus malvaceus Focke
- Rubus malvernicus Edees
- Rubus mandonii Focke
- Rubus maquipucunensis Espinel-Ortiz & Romol.
- Rubus marianus (E.H.L.Krause) H.E.Weber
- Rubus marschallianus Juz.
- Rubus marshallii Focke & W.M.Rogers
- Rubus marssonianus H.E.Weber
- Rubus martensenii H.E.Weber
- Rubus × masakii Naruh.
- Rubus maureri Király, Trávn. & Žíla
- Rubus maximiformis H.E.Weber
- Rubus × maximowiczii Kuntze
- Rubus maximus T.Marsson
- Rubus mearnsii Elmer
- Rubus megacarpus P.Royen
- Rubus megalococcus Focke
- Rubus megistothyrsos A.Beek
- Rubus meierottii H.E.Weber
- Rubus meijerianus A.Beek
- Rubus melanocladus (Sudre) Ridd.
- Rubus melanodermis Focke ex W.M.Rogers
- Rubus melanosus Plien.
- Rubus melanoxylon P.J.Müll. & Wirtg.
- Rubus mellispersus Plien.
- Rubus menglaensis T.T.Yu & L.T.Lu
- Rubus mercicus Bagn.
- Rubus mercieri Genev.
- Rubus merlinii A.Newton & M.Porter
- Rubus mesogaeus Focke
- Rubus metallorum Margetts
- Rubus metoensis T.T.Yu & L.T.Lu
- Rubus micans Godr.
- Rubus × michinokuensis Fujiw. & Yu.Abe
- Rubus microdontus P.J.Müll. & Lefèvre
- Rubus micropetalus Gardner
- Rubus microphyllus L.f.
- Rubus milesianus D.E.Allen
- Rubus milfordensis Edees
- Rubus minusculus H.Lév. & Vaniot
- Rubus minutipetalus J.-M.Royer & D.P.Mercier
- Rubus mirabeaui Duboc & D.P.Mercier
- Rubus × miscix L.H.Bailey
- Rubus miser Liebm.
- Rubus miszczenkoi Juz.
- Rubus mollifrons Focke
- Rubus mollis J.Presl & C.Presl
- Rubus mollissimus W.M.Rogers
- Rubus moluccanus L.
- Rubus monensis W.C.Barton & Ridd.
- Rubus monneriensis Duboc & D.P.Mercier
- Rubus montanus Lib. ex Lej.
- Rubus montis-wilhelmii P.Royen
- Rubus moorei F.Muell.
- Rubus morganwgensis W.C.Barton & Ridd.
- Rubus morifolius P.J.Müll.
- Rubus mortensenii (Frid. & Gelert) E.H.L.Krause
- Rubus morvennicus Gillot ex Boulay
- Rubus moschus Juz.
- Rubus mougeotii Billot
- Rubus moylei W.C.Barton & Ridd.
- Rubus mucronatiformis (Sudre) W.C.R.Watson
- Rubus mucronatoides Ley ex W.M.Rogers
- Rubus mucronipetalus P.J.Müll.
- Rubus mucronulatus Boreau
- Rubus muenteri T.Marsson
- Rubus muhelicus Danner
- Rubus multifidus Boulay & Malbr.
- Rubus mundii Cham. & Schltdl.
- Rubus muricatus Boulay & Gillot
- Rubus muricola Sennen
- Rubus muridens A.Beek
- Rubus murrayi Sudre
- Rubus mus A.Beek
- Rubus myricae Focke

== N ==
- Rubus nagasawanus Koidz.
- Rubus × nakaii Tuyama
- Rubus nakeralicus Sanadze
- Rubus naldrettii (J.W.White) W.C.R.Watson
- Rubus napellus Plien.
- Rubus naumannii Schön
- Rubus neanias A.Beek
- Rubus nebulosus A.R.Bean
- Rubus neerlandicus A.Beek
- Rubus negatus A.Beek
- Rubus × neglectus Peck
- Rubus nelliae A.Beek
- Rubus nelsonii Rydb.
- Rubus nemophilus Ripart ex Genev.
- Rubus nemoralis P.J.Müll.
- Rubus nemorensis Lefèvre & P.J.Müll.
- Rubus nemoripetens Meijer, Troelstra & A.Beek
- Rubus nemorosoides H.E.Weber
- Rubus nemorosus Hayne ex Willd.
- Rubus neoebudicus Guillaumin
- Rubus neofuscifolius Y.F.Deng
- Rubus × neogardicus Juz.
- Rubus neohunanensis X.H.Xiong & X.F.Gao
- Rubus neomalacus Sudre
- Rubus neomultisetosus Idrees
- Rubus nepalensis (Hook.f.) Kuntze
- Rubus nerisiensis Duboc & D.P.Mercier
- Rubus nesiotes Focke
- Rubus newbouldianus Rilstone
- Rubus newbouldii Bab.
- Rubus newbridgensis W.C.Barton & Ridd.
- Rubus newtonii Ballantyne
- Rubus nguyenii Huan C.Wang
- Rubus × nigakuma Oka & Naruh.
- Rubus nigricans Danthoine
- Rubus nigricatus P.J.Müll. & Lefèvre
- Rubus nigricaulis Prokh.
- Rubus × nikaii Ohwi
- Rubus ninckii (Sudre) C.K.Schneid.
- Rubus nishimuranus Koidz.
- Rubus nitidiformis Sudre
- Rubus nivalis Douglas ex Hook.
- Rubus niveus Thunb.
- Rubus nobilissimus (W.C.R.Watson) Pearsall
- Rubus noli-tangere A.Beek
- Rubus noltei H.E.Weber
- Rubus nordicus (H.E.Weber & A.Pedersen) H.E.Weber
- Rubus noricus Hohla, Pagitz & Király
- Rubus norvicensis A.L.Bull & Edees
- Rubus × novanglicus L.H.Bailey
- Rubus novoguineensis Merr. & L.M.Perry
- Rubus nubigenus Kunth
- Rubus nudiusculus Plien.
- Rubus nuptialis H.E.Weber
- Rubus nyalamensis T.T.Yu & L.T.Lu

== O ==
- Rubus oberdorferi H.E.Weber
- Rubus oblongifolius P.J.Müll. & Wirtg.
- Rubus oblongifrons (Sudre) E.G.Camus, Gillot & Malinv.
- Rubus oblongo-obovatus Markova
- Rubus oblongus T.T.Yu & L.T.Lu
- Rubus oboranus Sprib.
- Rubus obscuriflorus Edees & A.Newton
- Rubus obtrullatus T.Gregor & W.Jansen
- Rubus obtusangulus Gremli
- Rubus obvallatus Boulay & Gillot
- Rubus occidentalis L.
- Rubus occultiglans Meierott
- Rubus ochraceus Cardot
- Rubus ochtodes Juz.
- Rubus ocnensis Nyár.
- Rubus odoratus L.
- Rubus oenensis H.E.Weber
- Rubus offensus P.J.Müll.
- Rubus × ohmineanus Koidz.
- Rubus × ohtakiensis Naruh.
- Rubus × okae Momiy.
- Rubus okinawensis Koidz.
- Rubus oklejewiczii Wolanin & M.Nobis
- Rubus omalodontus P.J.Müll. & Wirtg.
- Rubus onsalaensis Ryde
- Rubus opacus Focke ex Bertram
- Rubus opulifolius Bertol.
- Rubus orbifolius Boulay & Letendre ex Lefèvre
- Rubus orbifrons H.E.Weber
- Rubus orbus W.C.R.Watson
- Rubus ordovicum A.Newton
- Rubus oreades P.J.Müll. & Wirtg.
- Rubus organorum Duboc & D.P.Mercier
- Rubus originalis L.H.Bailey
- Rubus orthocladoides Sudre
- Rubus orthostachyoides H.E.Weber
- Rubus orthostachys G.Braun
- Rubus ossicus Juz.
- Rubus × ostensus Schmidely
- Rubus ostiarius Plien.
- Rubus ostrinus Focke
- Rubus ostroviensis Sprib.
- Rubus ostumensis A.R.Molina
- Rubus ourosepalus Cardot
- Rubus ovatisepalus Huan C.Wang
- Rubus ovatus Thuan
- Rubus oxyanchus Sudre

== P ==
- Rubus pacificus Hance
- Rubus painteri Edees
- Rubus palaefolius Matzke-Hajek
- Rubus pallidicaulis Boulay & J.B.Cornet
- Rubus pallidifolius E.H.L.Krause
- Rubus pallidisetus Sudre
- Rubus pallidus Weihe
- Rubus palmatifolius Thuan
- Rubus palmatiformis Z.H.Chen, Feng Chen & F.G.Zhang
- Rubus palmatus Thunb.
- Rubus palmensis A.Hansen
- Rubus palmeri Rydb.
- Rubus paludosus A.Beek
- Rubus pampinosus Lees
- Rubus panduratus Hand.-Mazz.
- Rubus paniculatus Sm.
- Rubus pannosus P.J.Müll. & Wirtg.
- Rubus pappei Eckl. & Zeyh.
- Rubus papuanus Schltr. ex Diels
- Rubus × paracaulis L.H.Bailey
- Rubus paraguariensis (Chodat & Hassl.) Basualdo & Zardini
- Rubus paraplicatus K.Meijer
- Rubus pararosifolius F.P.Metcalf
- Rubus parkeri Hance
- Rubus parthenocissus Trávn. & Holub
- Rubus parviaraliifolius Hayata
- Rubus parviflorus Nutt.
- Rubus parvifolius L.
- Rubus parvus Buchanan
- Rubus pascuorum W.C.R.Watson
- Rubus pascuus L.H.Bailey
- Rubus passaviensis Žila
- Rubus passionis A.Beek & K.Meijer
- Rubus patuliformis Sudre
- Rubus patulus P.J.Müll. & Lefèvre
- Rubus pauanus Mon.-Huelin
- Rubus paucidentatus T.T.Yu & L.T.Lu
- Rubus × paxii Focke
- Rubus pectinarioides H.Hara
- Rubus pectinaris Focke
- Rubus pectinellus Maxim.
- Rubus pedatifolius Genev.
- Rubus pedatus Sm.
- Rubus pedersenii Martensen & H.E.Weber
- Rubus pedica Matzke-Hajek
- Rubus pedunculosus D.Don
- Rubus peltatus Maxim.
- Rubus penduliflorus C.Y.Wu ex T.T.Yu & L.T.Lu
- Rubus pendulus Rusby
- Rubus peninsulae Rilstone
- Rubus pensilvanicus Poir.
- Rubus pentagonus Wall. ex Focke
- Rubus peratticus Samp.
- Rubus percrispus D.E.Allen & R.D.Randall
- Rubus perdemissus H.E.Weber & Martensen
- Rubus perdigitatus A.Newton
- Rubus perfulvus Merr.
- Rubus pericrispatus Holub & Trávn.
- Rubus perlongus H.E.Weber & W.Jansen
- Rubus × permixtus Blanch.
- Rubus perpedatus Žila & H.E.Weber
- Rubus perperus H.E.Weber
- Rubus perplexus P.J.Müll. ex Wirtg.
- Rubus perpungens M.Lepší, P.Lepší & Trávn.
- Rubus perrobustus Holub
- Rubus persicus Boiss.
- Rubus peruncinatus (Sudre) Juz.
- Rubus peruvianus Fritsch
- Rubus pervagus Sudre
- Rubus pervalidus Edees & A.Newton
- Rubus pervirescens Sudre
- Rubus pfuhlianus Sprib.
- Rubus phaeocarpus W.C.R.Watson
- Rubus phengodes Focke
- Rubus phoenicacanthus A.Beek
- Rubus phoenicolasius Maxim.
- Rubus phylloglotta (Frid.) Å.Gust.
- Rubus phyllophorus Lefèvre & P.J.Müll.
- Rubus phyllostachys P.J.Müll.
- Rubus phyllothyrsos Frid.
- Rubus picearum (A.Beek) A.Beek
- Rubus piceetorum Juz.
- Rubus picticaulis H.E.Weber
- Rubus pictorum Edees
- Rubus pignattii Camarda
- Rubus pileatus Focke
- Rubus pilulifer Focke
- Rubus pinicola Her.Hofmann
- Rubus pinnatisepalus Hemsl.
- Rubus piptopetalus Hayata ex Koidz.
- Rubus pirifolius Sm.
- Rubus placidus H.E.Weber
- Rubus plainfaingensis J.-M.Royer & D.P.Mercier
- Rubus planus A.Beek
- Rubus platyacanthus P.J.Müll. & Lefèvre
- Rubus platybelus Sudre
- Rubus platycephalus Focke
- Rubus platyphylloides Sanadze
- Rubus platysepalus Hand.-Mazz.
- Rubus playfairianus Hemsl. ex Focke
- Rubus plymensis (Focke) Edees & A.Newton
- Rubus podophyllos P.J.Müll.
- Rubus poliodes W.C.R.Watson
- Rubus poliophyllus Kuntze
- Rubus poliothyrsus A.Beek
- Rubus polonicus Weston
- Rubus polyadenus Cardot
- Rubus polyanthemus Lindeb.
- Rubus polybracteatus Ryde
- Rubus polyodontus Hand.-Mazz.
- Rubus polyoplus W.C.R.Watson
- Rubus porotoensis R.A.Graham
- Rubus porphyrocaulis A.Newton
- Rubus porphyromallos Focke
- Rubus portae-moravicae Holub & Trávn.
- Rubus posnaniensis Sprib.
- Rubus postumus A.Beek & D.P.Mercier
- Rubus potentilloides W.E.Evans
- Rubus pottianus H.E.Weber
- Rubus praeceptorum A.Beek
- Rubus praecocifrons Király & Trávn.
- Rubus praecox Bertol.
- Rubus praedatus Schmidely
- Rubus praestans H.E.Weber
- Rubus praetextus Sudre
- Rubus praticolor A.Beek
- Rubus prei (Sudre) Prain
- Rubus preptanthus Focke
- Rubus pringlei Rydb.
- Rubus prionatus (Sudre) Y.Hesl.-Harr.
- Rubus prissanicus Kosiński, Maliński & Ziel.
- Rubus probabilis L.H.Bailey
- Rubus probus L.H.Bailey
- Rubus procerus P.J.Müll. ex Boulay
- Rubus profusus Plien.
- Rubus projectus A.Beek
- Rubus prolongatus Boulay & Letendre
- Rubus promachonicus A.Beek
- Rubus × propinquus Richardson
- Rubus prosper L.H.Bailey
- Rubus pruinifer Sudre
- Rubus pseudincisior H.E.Weber
- Rubus pseudoacer Makino
- Rubus × pseudochingii Naruh. & H.Masaki
- Rubus pseudofagifolius Huan C.Wang
- Rubus pseudoglotta Drenckh. & W.Jansen
- Rubus pseudogravetii Sudre
- Rubus × pseudohakonensis Sugim.
- Rubus pseudohostilis W.Jansen
- Rubus pseudojaponicus Koidz.
- Rubus pseudolusaticus G.H.Loos
- Rubus pseudopileatus Cardot
- Rubus pseudopsis Gremli
- Rubus pseudoswinhoei Huan C.Wang & Z.R.He
- Rubus pseudotenellus Gilli
- Rubus pseudothyrsanthus (Frid. & Gelert) Frid. & Gelert
- Rubus pseudovitis Plien.
- Rubus × pseudoyoshinoi Naruh. & H.Masaki
- Rubus psilander A.Beek
- Rubus psilops A.Beek & K.Meijer
- Rubus ptilocarpus T.T.Yu & L.T.Lu
- Rubus puberulus Meierott
- Rubus pubescens Raf.
- Rubus pugiunculosus Matzke-Hajek
- Rubus pulcher P.J.Müll. & Lefèvre
- Rubus pulchricaulis Plien.
- Rubus pullifolius W.C.R.Watson
- Rubus pumilus Focke
- Rubus pungens Cambess.
- Rubus purbeckensis W.C.Barton & Ridd.
- Rubus purchasianus W.M.Rogers
- Rubus puyumaensis Juinn Y.Huang, P.H.Chen & A.C.Chung
- Rubus pycnostachys P.J.Müll.
- Rubus pydarensiformis D.E.Allen
- Rubus pydarensis Rilstone
- Rubus pyramidatus P.J.Müll.

== Q ==
- Rubus quartinianus A.Rich.
- Rubus queenslandicus A.R.Bean
- Rubus questieri Lefèvre & P.J.Müll.
- Rubus quinquefoliolatus T.T.Yu & L.T.Lu

== R ==
- Rubus racemosus Roxb.
- Rubus radicans Cav.
- Rubus radula Weihe
- Rubus radulicaulis Sudre
- Rubus raduliformis Sudre
- Rubus raduloides (F.Aresch.) Neuman
- Rubus ramachandrae S.S.Dash & Chand.Gupta
- Rubus ramosus A.Bloxam ex Briggs
- Rubus ranftii H.E.Weber
- Rubus raopingensis T.T.Yu & L.T.Lu
- Rubus raunkiaeri (Frid.) Gust.
- Rubus × recurvicaulis Blanch.
- Rubus reflexus Ker Gawl.
- Rubus refractus H.Lév.
- Rubus remotifolius Plien.
- Rubus repens (L.) Kuntze
- Rubus revealii A.Beek & Widrl.
- Rubus rhamnophyllus A.Beek & D.P.Mercier
- Rubus rhombicus H.E.Weber
- Rubus rhombifolius Weihe
- Rubus rhytidophyllus H.E.Weber
- Rubus × ribifolius Siebold & Zucc.
- Rubus ribisoideus Matsum.
- Rubus riddelsdellii Rilstone
- Rubus rigidus Sm.
- Rubus rilstonei W.C.Barton & Ridd.
- Rubus ripuaricus Matzke-Hajek
- Rubus rivularis Wirtg. & P.J.Müll.
- Rubus × rixosus L.H.Bailey
- Rubus roberti Matzke-Hajek
- Rubus robiae (W.C.R.Watson) A.Newton
- Rubus rolfei S.Vidal
- Rubus rosaceus Weihe
- Rubus rosanthus Lindeb.
- Rubus roseus Poir.
- Rubus rosifolius Sm.
- Rubus rossensis A.Newton
- Rubus rotundatiformis Sudre
- Rubus rotundifoliatus Sudre
- Rubus royenii Kalkman
- Rubus rubicundus P.J.Müll. & Wirtg.
- Rubus ruboculus Ryde
- Rubus ruborensis Matzke-Hajek
- Rubus rubriflorus Purchas
- Rubus rubrisetulosus Cardot
- Rubus rubristylus W.C.R.Watson
- Rubus rubritinctus W.C.R.Watson
- Rubus rubrumcadaver A.Beek
- Rubus rudis Weihe
- Rubus rufescens Lefèvre & P.J.Müll.
- Rubus rufus Focke
- Rubus rugosifolius G.H.Loos
- Rubus rugosus Sm.
- Rubus rugulosus Ryde
- Rubus runssorensis Engl.
- Rubus rurae G.H.Loos
- Rubus rusbyi Britton

== S ==
- Rubus saladiensis Király, Trávn. & Žíla
- Rubus salisburgensis Focke ex Caflisch
- Rubus saltuum Focke ex Gremli
- Rubus salwinensis Hand.-Mazz.
- Rubus salzmannii W.Maurer
- Rubus sampaioanus Sudre ex Samp.
- Rubus sanadzeae Idrees & J.M.H.Shaw
- Rubus sanctae-hildegardis Matzke-Hajek
- Rubus sapidus Schltdl.
- Rubus sarissifer Plien.
- Rubus saxatilis L.
- Rubus saxicola P.J.Müll.
- Rubus saxonicus Her.Hofmann
- Rubus scaber Weihe
- Rubus scabripes Genev.
- Rubus scabrosus P.J.Müll.
- Rubus scarbantinus Király & Trávn.
- Rubus schefferi Focke
- Rubus scheffleri Engl.
- Rubus schiedeanus Steud.
- Rubus schipperi A.Beek
- Rubus schlechtendalii Weihe ex Link
- Rubus schlechtendaliiformis H.E.Weber
- Rubus schleicheri Weihe ex Tratt.
- Rubus schleicheriformis W.Jansen
- Rubus schlickumii Wirtg.
- Rubus schmidelioides A.Cunn.
- Rubus schorleri (Artzt & Her.Hofmann) H.E.Weber
- Rubus schottii Pohl ex Focke
- Rubus schumacheri (Ade) Matzke-Hajek
- Rubus scidularum A.Beek
- Rubus sciocharis (Sudre) Kinscher
- Rubus sciophilus Lefèvre & P.J.Müll.
- Rubus scissoides H.E.Weber
- Rubus scissus W.C.R.Watson
- Rubus scoliacanthus A.Beek
- Rubus scoticus (W.M.Rogers & Ley) Edees
- Rubus sectiramus W.C.R.Watson
- Rubus seebergensis Pfuhl ex Sprib.
- Rubus segontii A.Newton & M.Porter
- Rubus selleanus Helwig
- Rubus sellii Idrees & J.M.H.Shaw
- Rubus sellowii Cham. & Schltdl.
- Rubus semibracteosus Sudre
- Rubus semicarpinifolius Sudre
- Rubus semicaucasicus Sudre
- Rubus semiglaber (W.M.Rogers) W.C.R.Watson
- Rubus × seminepalensis Naruh.
- Rubus semirivularis Sudre
- Rubus semitomentosus Borbás
- Rubus sempernitens D.E.Allen & Margetts
- Rubus senchalensis H.Hara
- Rubus sendtneri Progel
- Rubus sengorensis Grierson & D.G.Long
- Rubus senticops H.E.Weber & W.Jansen
- Rubus senticosus Köhler ex Weihe
- Rubus septentrionalis W.C.R.Watson
- Rubus septifolius H.E.Weber
- Rubus serpens Weihe ex Lej. & Courtois
- Rubus serrae Soldano
- Rubus serratus J.F.Gmel.
- Rubus servaticus G.H.Loos
- Rubus setchuenensis Bureau & Franch.
- Rubus setosus Bigelow
- Rubus shihae F.P.Metcalf
- Rubus sieberi Her.Hofmann
- Rubus sieboldii Blume
- Rubus siekensis Banning ex G.Braun
- Rubus siemianicensis (Sprib.) Sprib.
- Rubus sierrae Laferr.
- Rubus sieuwkei Bijlsma
- Rubus sikkimensis Hook.f.
- Rubus silesiacus Weihe
- Rubus silurum (Ley) Ley
- Rubus silvae-bavaricae Gaggerm.
- Rubus silvae-bohemicae Holub ex Trávn. & Žíla
- Rubus silvae-norticae M.Lepší & P.Lepší
- Rubus silvae-thuringiae W.Jansen
- Rubus silvaticus Weihe & Nees
- Rubus simplex Focke
- Rubus sivasicus Yıld. & Kılıç
- Rubus siyuanensis S.S.Ying
- Rubus slavonicus Király, Trávn. & Žíla
- Rubus slesvicensis Lange
- Rubus smithii Backer
- Rubus sneydii Edees
- Rubus soendrumensis Ryde
- Rubus solvensis W.Maurer
- Rubus sorbicus H.E.Weber
- Rubus sorsogonensis Elmer
- Rubus spananthus Ze M.Wu & Z.L.Cheng
- Rubus sparsiflorus J.F.Macbr.
- Rubus spectabilis Pursh
- Rubus speculans K.Meijer
- Rubus speculatus Matzke-Hajek
- Rubus spiculus K.Meijer
- Rubus spina-curva Boulay & Gillot
- Rubus spinulatus Boulay
- Rubus spinulosoides F.P.Metcalf
- Rubus splendidissimus H.Hara
- Rubus splendidus P.J.Müll. & Lefèvre
- Rubus sprengelii Weihe
- Rubus sprengeliusculus (Frid. & Gelert) H.E.Weber
- Rubus spribillei (Pfuhl ex Sprib.) Kulesza
- Rubus squarrosus Fritsch
- Rubus stabilis Plien.
- Rubus stanneus W.C.Barton & Ridd.
- Rubus stans Focke
- Rubus steneoacanthus P.J.Müll. & Lefèvre
- Rubus stereacanthos P.J.Müll. ex Boulay
- Rubus steudneri Schweinf.
- Rubus stimulans Focke
- Rubus stimuleus L.H.Bailey
- Rubus stimulifer Plien.
- Rubus stipulosus T.T.Yu & L.T.Lu
- Rubus stohrii H.E.Weber & Ranft
- Rubus stormanicus H.E.Weber
- Rubus striaticaulis Plien.
- Rubus styriacus Halácsy
- Rubus subaculeatus Gand.
- Rubus subadenanthus P.D.Sell
- Rubus subcoreanus T.T.Yu & L.T.Lu
- Rubus subgothicus Sprib.
- Rubus subinermoides Druce
- Rubus subinopertus T.T.Yu & L.T.Lu
- Rubus subintegribasis Druce
- Rubus sublustris Lees
- Rubus subopacus (Sudre ex Bouvet) D.E.Allen
- Rubus subornatus Focke
- Rubus subspicatus Hauman
- Rubus subtercanens W.C.R.Watson
- Rubus subtibetanus Hand.-Mazz.
- Rubus subtiliaceus (Frid.) H.E.Weber & Martensen
- Rubus suecicus H.E.Weber & Karlsson
- Rubus suevicola H.E.Weber
- Rubus sulcatus Vest
- Rubus sumatranus Miq.
- Rubus sundaicus Blume
- Rubus surrectus K.Meijer
- Rubus surrejanus W.C.Barton & Ridd.
- Rubus suspiciosus Menezes
- Rubus swinhoei Hance
- Rubus sylvulicola Progel ex Utsch

== T ==
- Rubus tabanimontanus Figert
- Rubus taitoensis Hayata
- Rubus taiwanicola Koidz. & Ohwi
- Rubus takhtadjanii Mulk.
- Rubus tamarensis A.Newton
- Rubus tamdaoensis T.H.Nguyên & Yakovlev
- Rubus tardus W.C.R.Watson
- Rubus tarnensis Sudre
- Rubus taronensis C.Y.Wu ex T.T.Yu & L.T.Lu
- Rubus tauni Schnedler & H.Grossh.
- Rubus tauricus Schltdl. ex Juz.
- Rubus × tawadanus Koidz.
- Rubus taxandriae Vannerom ex A.Beek
- Rubus tayulinensis S.S.Ying
- Rubus tegulifolius A.Beek, Bijlsma & Devriese
- Rubus tenuiarmatus Lees
- Rubus tenuihabitus G.H.Loos
- Rubus tenuimollis Mikoláš
- Rubus tephrodes Hance
- Rubus tereticaulis P.J.Müll.
- Rubus teretiusculus Kaltenb.
- Rubus terjatensis Duboc & D.P.Mercier
- Rubus tetsunii Huan C.Wang & H.Sun
- Rubus thaumasius A.Beek
- Rubus thelybatos Focke ex Caflisch
- Rubus thibetanus Franch.
- Rubus thomsonii Focke
- Rubus × thuillieri Poir. ex Steud.
- Rubus thuringensis Metsch
- Rubus thurstonii Rilstone
- Rubus thyrsigeriformis (Sudre) D.E.Allen
- Rubus tiliaceus Sm.
- Rubus × tiliaster H.E.Weber
- Rubus tiliifrons W.Jansen & H.E.Weber
- Rubus tingzhouensis C.An & G.C.Lin
- Rubus tinifolius C.Y.Wu ex T.T.Yu & L.T.Lu
- Rubus titanus L.H.Bailey
- Rubus tonkinensis F.Bolle
- Rubus × toyorensis Koidz.
- Rubus tozawae Nakai ex J.Y.Yang
- Rubus trachycaulon (Sudre) Malinv.
- Rubus transitorius G.H.Loos
- Rubus transvaliensis Gust.
- Rubus transvestitus Matzke-Hajek
- Rubus × tranzschelii Juz.
- Rubus treignacensis Duboc & D.P.Mercier
- Rubus trelleckensis Edees & A.Newton
- Rubus treutleri Hook.f.
- Rubus trichanthus A.Beek
- Rubus trichogynus A.Beek
- Rubus tricolor Focke ex Prain
- Rubus trifidus Thunb.
- Rubus × trifrons Blanch.
- Rubus trigonodontos Boulay
- Rubus trigonus Kalkman
- Rubus trijugus Focke
- Rubus trilobus Ser.
- Rubus trimmerodontus Bijlsma & A.Beek
- Rubus trinovantium A.L.Bull
- Rubus trivialis Michx.
- Rubus troiensis A.Newton
- Rubus × trux Ashe
- Rubus tubanticus A.Beek
- Rubus tuberculatiformis H.E.Weber
- Rubus tumidus Gremli
- Rubus tumulorum Rilstone
- Rubus turkestanicus (Regel) Pavlov
- Rubus turquinensis Rydb.

== U ==
- Rubus ubericus Matzke-Hajek
- Rubus uhdeanus Focke
- Rubus ulmifolius Schott
- Rubus umbrosus (Weihe & Nees) Arrh.
- Rubus uncimontanus A.Beek & Troelstra
- Rubus uncinatus P.J.Müll.
- Rubus × uncinellus P.J.Müll. & Lefèvre
- Rubus undabundus Juz.
- Rubus urbionicus Mon.-Huelin
- Rubus urocerus Plien.
- Rubus ursinus Cham. & Schltdl.
- Rubus urticifolius Poir.
- Rubus × utchinensis Koidz.

== V ==
- Rubus vadalis A.Beek
- Rubus vagabundus Samp.
- Rubus vagensis A.Newton & M.Porter
- Rubus vahlii Frid.
- Rubus vallis-cembrae Prosser & Király
- Rubus vandebeekii K.Meijer
- Rubus vandermeijdenii A.Beek
- Rubus vaniloquus A.Schumach. ex H.E.Weber
- Rubus vanwinkelii A.Beek & Vannerom
- Rubus varvicensis Edees
- Rubus vassivierensis Duboc & D.P.Mercier
- Rubus vastus (Sabr.) Hayek
- Rubus vatavensis Žíla & Trávn.
- Rubus velox L.H.Bailey
- Rubus venetorum D.E.Allen
- Rubus venosus W.Maurer
- Rubus venustus A.Favrat
- Rubus verae-crucis Rydb.
- Rubus vernieri J.-M.Royer & D.P.Mercier
- Rubus vernus Focke
- Rubus vespicum P.J.Müll. & Wirtg.
- Rubus vestitus Weihe
- Rubus vigoi Roselló, Peris & Stübing
- Rubus vigursii Rilstone
- Rubus vikensis A.Pedersen ex G.Wendt
- Rubus villarsianus Focke ex Gremli
- Rubus villicauliformis A.Newton
- Rubus villosior A.L.Bull
- Rubus vincentiorum Duboc & D.P.Mercier
- Rubus vindomensis D.E.Allen
- Rubus violaceifrons P.Havlíček, Trávn. & Velebil
- Rubus viridescens (W.M.Rogers) T.A.W.Davis
- Rubus viridilucidus Drenckh.
- Rubus viscosus Weihe ex Lej. & Courtois
- Rubus volkensii Engl.
- Rubus vratnensis Holub
- Rubus vulcanicola (Donn.Sm.) Rydb.

== W ==
- Rubus waddellii D.E.Allen
- Rubus wahlbergii Arrh.
- Rubus wahlbergioides Ryde & T.Burén
- Rubus wallichianus Wight & Arn.
- Rubus walsemannii H.E.Weber
- Rubus walteri H.E.Weber & H.Grossh.
- Rubus wangii F.P.Metcalf
- Rubus wardii Merr.
- Rubus warrenii Sudre
- Rubus watsonii W.H.Mills
- Rubus wawushanensis T.T.Yu & L.T.Lu
- Rubus weberbaueri Focke
- Rubus wedgwoodiae W.C.Barton & Ridd.
- Rubus weizensis W.Maurer
- Rubus wendtii Ryde
- Rubus wessbergii A.Pedersen & Walseman
- Rubus wilsonii Duthie ex J.H.Veitch
- Rubus wimmerianus (Sprib. ex Sudre) Sprib.
- Rubus winteri (P.J.Müll. ex Focke) A.Först.
- Rubus wirralensis A.Newton
- Rubus wirtgenii Auersw. ex Wirtg.
- Rubus × wisconsinensis L.H.Bailey
- Rubus wittigianus H.E.Weber
- Rubus woronowii (Sudre) Sudre
- Rubus wuchuanensis S.Z.He
- Rubus wushanensis T.T.Yu & L.T.Lu
- Rubus wuzhianus L.T.Lu & Boufford

== X ==
- Rubus xanthocarpus Bureau & Franch.
- Rubus xanthoneurus Focke
- Rubus xiangyangianus S.S.Ying
- Rubus xichouensis T.T.Yu & L.T.Lu
- Rubus xiphophorus H.E.Weber

== Y ==
- Rubus yanyunii Y.T.Chang & L.Y.Chen
- Rubus × yatabei Focke
- Rubus × yenosimanus Koidz.
- Rubus yingjiangensis Huan C.Wang
- Rubus yiwuanus W.P.Fang
- Rubus yoshinoi Koidz.
- Rubus yuenfengensis S.S.Ying
- Rubus yuliensis Y.C.Liu & F.Y.Lu
- Rubus yunanicus Kuntze

== Z ==
- Rubus zangezurus Mulk.
- Rubus zhaogoshanensis T.T.Yu & L.T.Lu
- Rubus zielinskii Wolanin & M.N.Wolanin
- Rubus zixishanensis Huan C.Wang & Q.P.Wang
