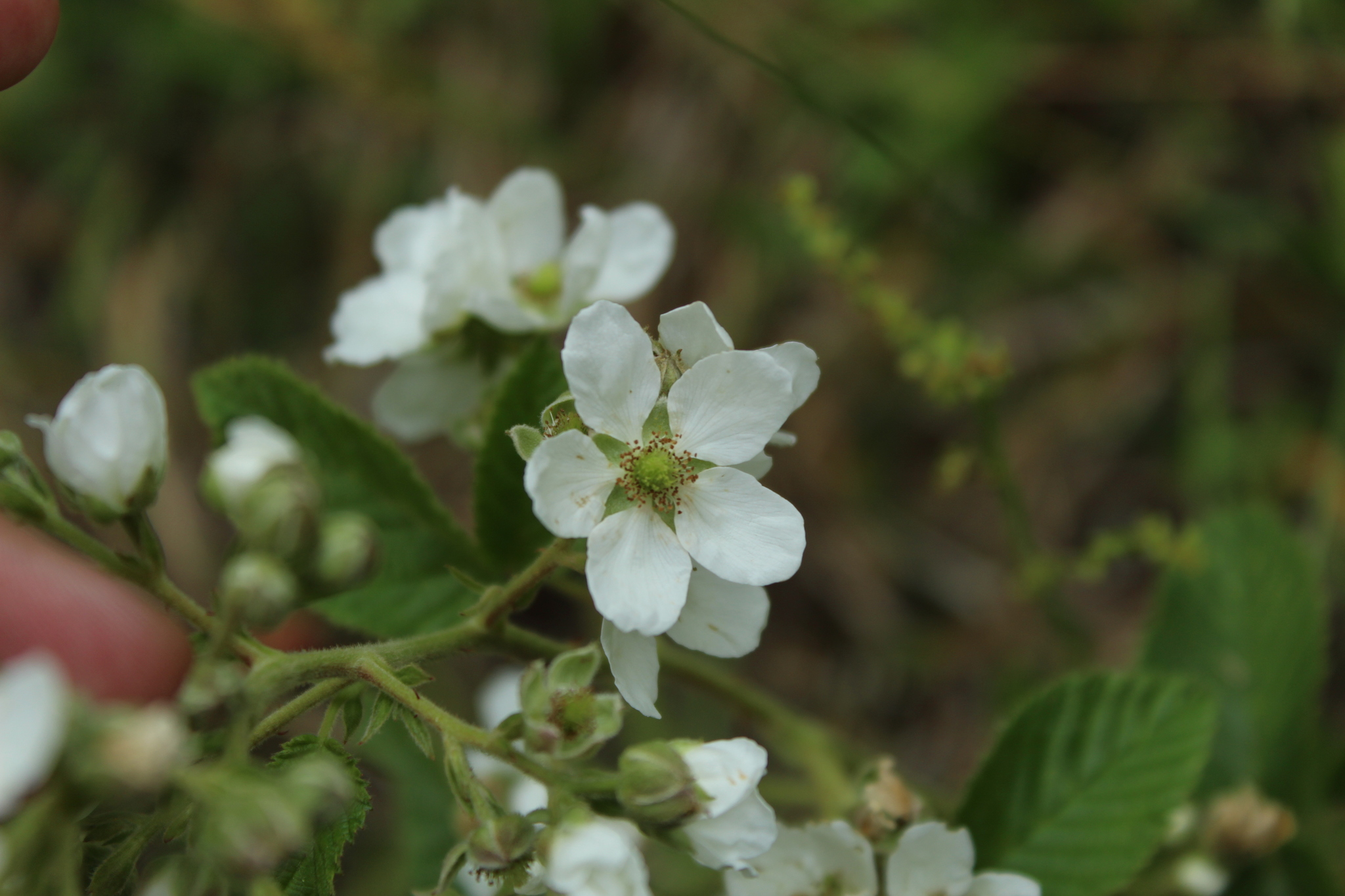

Scientific classification
- Kingdom: Plantae
- Clade: Embryophytes
- Clade: Tracheophytes
- Clade: Spermatophytes
- Clade: Angiosperms
- Clade: Eudicots
- Clade: Rosids
- Order: Rosales
- Family: Rosaceae
- Genus: Rubus
- Species: R. floribundus

Binomial name
- Rubus floribundus Kunth 1824

Synonyms
- Rubus robustus C.Presl

= Rubus floribundus =

Species of fruit and plant

Rubus floribundus is a South American species of bramble in the rose family.

The species is a perennial with soft wool and a few curved prickles. The leaves are compound with 3 or 5 stiff leaflets. The flowers are white and the fruits are purple.

It grows in northwestern South America, as far south as Bolivia.
