= Rubus fagifolius =

Scientific classification
- Kingdom: Plantae
- Clade: Embryophytes
- Clade: Tracheophytes
- Clade: Spermatophytes
- Clade: Angiosperms
- Clade: Eudicots
- Clade: Rosids
- Order: Rosales
- Family: Rosaceae
- Genus: Rubus
- Species: R. fagifolius

Binomial name
- Rubus fagifolius Schltdl. & Cham. 1830

Species of plant

Rubus fagifolius is a Mesoamerican species of bramble in the rose family.

The species is a climbing perennial sometimes reaching 18 metres (59 ft) above the ground. The stems have curved prickles. The leaves are compound with 3 or 5 thick, leathery leaflets. The flowers are white and the fruits are red, the drupelets falling apart separately.

It grows in southern Mexico (Veracruz, Oaxaca, and Chiapas) and Central America (Belize, Guatemala, El Salvador, and Costa Rica).
