= Rubus nelsonii =

Scientific classification
- Kingdom: Plantae
- Clade: Embryophytes
- Clade: Tracheophytes
- Clade: Spermatophytes
- Clade: Angiosperms
- Clade: Eudicots
- Clade: Rosids
- Order: Rosales
- Family: Rosaceae
- Genus: Rubus
- Species: R. nelsonii

Binomial name
- Rubus nelsonii Rydb. 1913

Species of fruit and plant

Rubus nelsonii is an uncommon Mexican species of bramble.

It is a perennial plant with stems up to 4 metres (13 feet) long, reclining on walls, rocks, or other vegetation. The stems are purple, hairy and with relatively few, weak curved prickles. The leaves are compound with 3 or 5 leaflets. The flowers are white and the fruits are dark purple.

The species has been found only in the State of Oaxaca in southern Mexico.
