= Rubus alpinus =

Scientific classification
- Kingdom: Plantae
- Clade: Tracheophytes
- Clade: Angiosperms
- Clade: Eudicots
- Clade: Rosids
- Order: Rosales
- Family: Rosaceae
- Genus: Rubus
- Species: R. alpinus

Binomial name
- Rubus alpinus Macfad. 1850 not Sudre 1898

Synonyms
- Rubus guayensis Focke

Species of fruit and plant

Rubus alpinus is a New World species of bramble in the rose family.

It is a perennial plant with purple stems that have curved prickles. The leaves are compound with 3 or 5 leaflets. The flowers are white. The fruits are hairless, the drupelets falling off separately.

The species grows in Jamaica, Costa Rica, Guatemala, Colombia, Honduras, Panama, Venezuela, and the three Guianas.
