= Rubus ferrugineus =

Scientific classification
- Kingdom: Plantae
- Clade: Embryophytes
- Clade: Tracheophytes
- Clade: Spermatophytes
- Clade: Angiosperms
- Clade: Eudicots
- Clade: Rosids
- Order: Rosales
- Family: Rosaceae
- Genus: Rubus
- Species: R. ferrugineus

Binomial name
- Rubus ferrugineus Wikstr. 1827 not Griseb. 1866

Species of fruit and plant

Rubus ferrugineus is a Caribbean species of bramble in the rose family.

The species is a perennial shrub or small tree with stems up to 6 meters (20 feet) tall, with curved prickles. The stems are covered with wool and armed with curved prickles. The leaves are compound with 3 or 5 leaflets. The flowers are white, while the fruits are black and egg-shaped.

It has been found only on the island of Guadeloupe in the West Indies, part of the French Republic.
