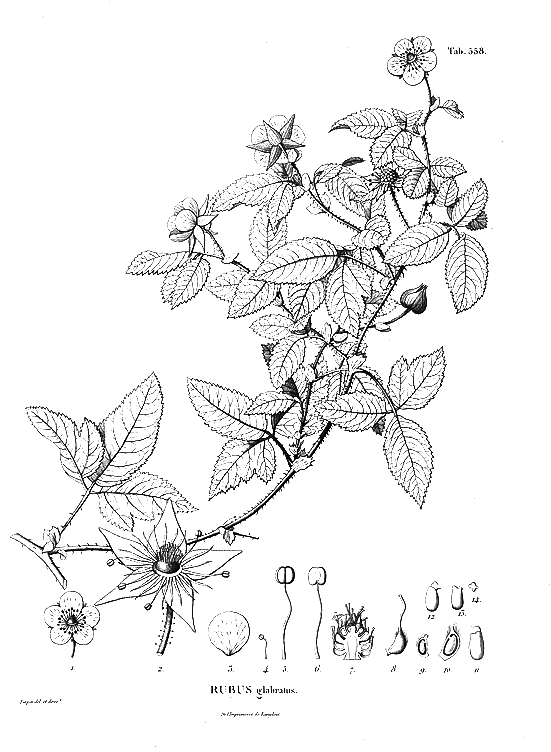

Scientific classification
- Kingdom: Plantae
- Clade: Embryophytes
- Clade: Tracheophytes
- Clade: Spermatophytes
- Clade: Angiosperms
- Clade: Eudicots
- Clade: Rosids
- Order: Rosales
- Family: Rosaceae
- Genus: Rubus
- Species: R. glabratus

Binomial name
- Rubus glabratus Kunth 1824 not W.C.R.Watson 1930 nor Custer ex Hegetschw. 1839

= Rubus glabratus =

Species of fruit and plant

Rubus glabratus is a Latin American species of bramble in the rose family. It forms a perennial subshrub. The stems are up to 80 centimetres (31 in) long and have curved prickles. The flowers are rose-colored and the fruit is red.

The genetics of Rubus is extremely complex, making it difficult to decide which groups should be recognized as species. As there are many rare species with limited ranges such as this, further study is needed to clarify the taxonomy.

The plant is native to Central America (Panama, Costa Rica) and South America (Colombia, Ecuador, Bolivia).
