= Rubus coriaceus =

- Leaves and fruit, Quito, Ecuador

Scientific classification
- Kingdom: Plantae
- Clade: Tracheophytes
- Clade: Angiosperms
- Clade: Eudicots
- Clade: Rosids
- Order: Rosales
- Family: Rosaceae
- Genus: Rubus
- Species: R. coriaceus

Binomial name
- Rubus coriaceus Poir.

Synonyms
- Rubus roseus var. coriaceus (Poir.) Spreng.; Rubus stuebellii Hieron.

Species of plant

Rubus coriaceus is a species of flowering plant in the family Rosaceae.

A scrambling subshrub with leathery leaves, it has been recorded growing in the high Andes of western South America at 3,900 m (12,800 ft) above sea level.

Its fruit is considered a delicacy and is collected in the wild for sale in local markets.
