= Rubus domingensis =

Scientific classification
- Kingdom: Plantae
- Clade: Tracheophytes
- Clade: Angiosperms
- Clade: Eudicots
- Clade: Rosids
- Order: Rosales
- Family: Rosaceae
- Genus: Rubus
- Species: R. domingensis

Binomial name
- Rubus domingensis Focke 1890

Species of fruit and plant

Rubus domingensis is a Caribbean species of brambles in the rose family. It has been found only in the Dominican Republic.

== Description ==
Rubus domingensis is a climbing perennial up to 3 metres (10 ft) tall. The leaves are compound with 3 thick, leathery leaflets.

The flowers are white and the fruits are black.

== Etymology ==
The species has been given the specific epithet "domingensis", as it occurs on the island of Hispaniola. This island was historically called Santo Domingo, or Saint-Domingue.
