= Rubus miser =

Scientific classification
- Kingdom: Plantae
- Clade: Embryophytes
- Clade: Tracheophytes
- Clade: Spermatophytes
- Clade: Angiosperms
- Clade: Eudicots
- Clade: Rosids
- Order: Rosales
- Family: Rosaceae
- Genus: Rubus
- Species: R. miser

Binomial name
- Rubus miser Liebm. 1853

Species of fruit and plant

Rubus miser is a Mesoamerican species of bramble. It forms an arching shrub with curved prickles. The leaves are compound with three thick, leathery leaflets. The fruits are black and very sour.

It grows in southern Mexico (Oaxaca, Chiapas) and Central America (Guatemala, El Salvador, Honduras, Nicaragua, Costa Rica, Panama).
