= Rubus schiedeanus =

Scientific classification
- Kingdom: Plantae
- Clade: Embryophytes
- Clade: Tracheophytes
- Clade: Spermatophytes
- Clade: Angiosperms
- Clade: Eudicots
- Clade: Rosids
- Order: Rosales
- Family: Rosaceae
- Genus: Rubus
- Species: R. schiedeanus

Binomial name
- Rubus schiedeanus Steud. 1841

Synonyms
- Rubus dumetorum Schltdl. 1839, illegitimate homonym not Weihe ex Boenn. 1824

Species of fruit and plant

Rubus schiedeanus is a Mesoamerican species of bramble.

The plant is a hairy and prickly perennial. The leaves are compound with 3 or 5 leaflets, which are thick and leathery. The flowers are white and the fruits black.

It grows in southern Mexico (Chiapas, Oaxaca, Veracruz) and Central America (Guatemala, Honduras, Nicaragua, Honduras).
