= Rubus probabilis =

Scientific classification
- Kingdom: Plantae
- Clade: Embryophytes
- Clade: Tracheophytes
- Clade: Spermatophytes
- Clade: Angiosperms
- Clade: Eudicots
- Clade: Rosids
- Order: Rosales
- Family: Rosaceae
- Genus: Rubus
- Species: R. probabilis

Binomial name
- Rubus probabilis L.H.Bailey

Synonyms
- Rubus cuneifolius var. austrifer L.H.Bailey; Rubus sejunctus L.H.Bailey

Species of fruit and plant

Rubus probabilis is an uncommon North American species of bramble.

The genetics of Rubus is extremely complex, making it difficult to decide which groups should be recognized as species. As there are many rare species with limited ranges, further study is suggested to clarify the taxonomy.

The species grows in the southeastern United States from Maryland to Mississippi.
