= Rubus originalis =

Scientific classification
- Kingdom: Plantae
- Clade: Embryophytes
- Clade: Tracheophytes
- Clade: Spermatophytes
- Clade: Angiosperms
- Clade: Eudicots
- Clade: Rosids
- Order: Rosales
- Family: Rosaceae
- Genus: Rubus
- Species: R. originalis

Binomial name
- Rubus originalis L.H.Bailey 1945

Species of fruit and plant

Rubus originalis a rare North American species of bramble.

The genetics of Rubus is extremely complex, making it difficult to decide which groups should be recognized as species. There are many other rare species with limited ranges, making further study needed to clarify the taxonomy.

The species has been found in the eastern United States (New Jersey, Maryland, West Virginia, and North Carolina). It is not common anywhere.
