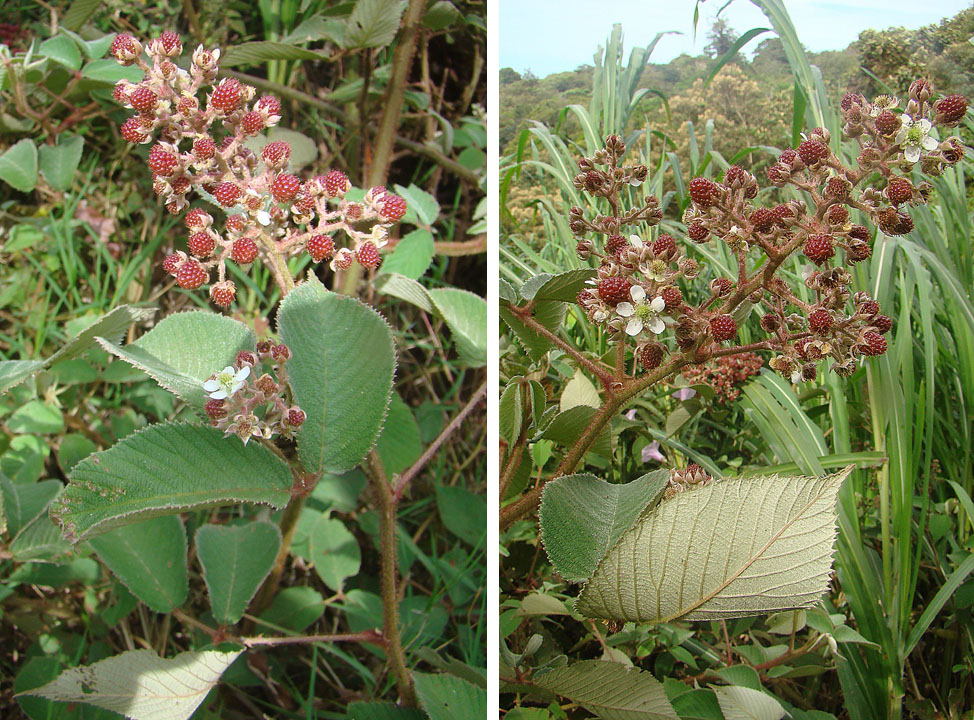

Scientific classification
- Kingdom: Plantae
- Clade: Embryophytes
- Clade: Tracheophytes
- Clade: Angiosperms
- Clade: Eudicots
- Clade: Rosids
- Order: Rosales
- Family: Rosaceae
- Genus: Rubus
- Species: R. urticifolius

Binomial name
- Rubus urticifolius Poir. 1804

= Rubus urticifolius =

Species of fruit and plant

Rubus urticifolius is a species of bramble in the Rosaceae family with a native range stretching from central Mexico to northern Argentina. It bears an edible fruit, often locally called mora de monte, and both its fruit and leaves were used in indigenous traditional medicines.
