= Rubus verae-crucis =

Scientific classification
- Kingdom: Plantae
- Clade: Embryophytes
- Clade: Tracheophytes
- Clade: Spermatophytes
- Clade: Angiosperms
- Clade: Eudicots
- Clade: Rosids
- Order: Rosales
- Family: Rosaceae
- Genus: Rubus
- Species: R. verae-crucis

Binomial name
- Rubus verae-crucis Rydb.

Synonyms
- Rubus veraecrucis Rydb.

Species of fruit and plant

Rubus verae-crucis is a Mexican species of bramble. It forms an erect perennial plant with gray wool and a few scattered curved prickles. The leaves are compound with 3 or 5 leaflets. The flowers are white.

It has been found only in the States of Oaxaca and Veracruz in Mexico.
