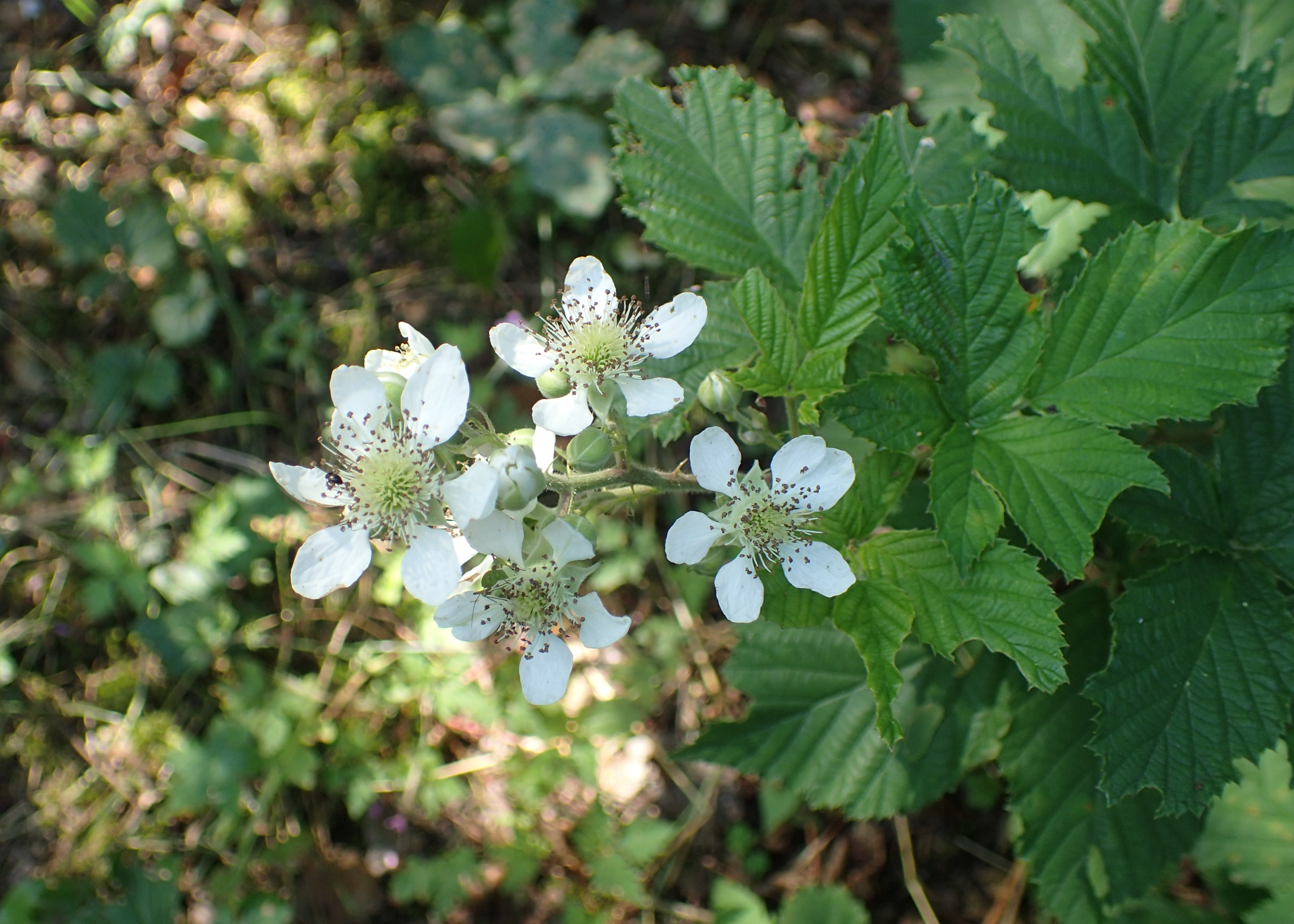

Scientific classification
- Kingdom: Plantae
- Clade: Embryophytes
- Clade: Tracheophytes
- Clade: Spermatophytes
- Clade: Angiosperms
- Clade: Eudicots
- Clade: Rosids
- Order: Rosales
- Family: Rosaceae
- Genus: Rubus
- Species: R. tabanimontanus

Binomial name
- Rubus tabanimontanus Figert

= Rubus tabanimontanus =

Species of flowering plant

Rubus tabanimontanus is a Central European species of bramble that forms a scrambling shrub. It was first described and named by the German botanist Ernst Figert in 1906.

Produced in Austria, the Czech Republic, Slovakia, and Poland. Its presence in Hungary is considered questionable and it is listed as extinct in Germany. It is found mainly along forest edges and in forest clearings, including forest roads and paths, burnt-out areas and deforestations.
