= Rubus geniculatus =

Scientific classification
- Kingdom: Plantae
- Clade: Embryophytes
- Clade: Tracheophytes
- Clade: Spermatophytes
- Clade: Angiosperms
- Clade: Eudicots
- Clade: Rosids
- Order: Rosales
- Family: Rosaceae
- Genus: Rubus
- Species: R. geniculatus

Binomial name
- Rubus geniculatus Kaltenb. 1845 not Focke 1868

Synonyms
- Rubus cerasifolius Lefèvre & P.J.Müll.; Rubus costatus var. geniculatus (Kaltenb.) Dumort.; Rubus falciferus P.J.Müll.; Rubus godronii var. cerasifolius (Lefèvre & P.J.Müll.) Boulay; Rubus hedycarpus subsp. geniculatus (Kaltenb.) H.E.Weber; Rubus pubescens var. geniculatus (Kaltenb.) Nyman

Species of fruit and plant

Rubus geniculatus is a European species of flowering plant in the rose family. It has compound leaves with 3 or 5 leaflets, green on the upper side and very pale green on the lower side. The flowers are white and the fruits are dark purple, almost black.

The genetics of Rubus is extremely complex, so it is difficult to decide which groups should be recognized as species. There are many rare taxa with limited ranges such as this. Further study is suggested to clarify the taxonomy.

The species is native to Europe but has a few naturalized populations in the eastern U.S. state of Virginia.
