= Rubus eriocarpus =

Scientific classification
- Kingdom: Plantae
- Clade: Embryophytes
- Clade: Tracheophytes
- Clade: Spermatophytes
- Clade: Angiosperms
- Clade: Eudicots
- Clade: Rosids
- Order: Rosales
- Family: Rosaceae
- Genus: Rubus
- Species: R. eriocarpus

Binomial name
- Rubus eriocarpus Liebm. 1853

Species of fruit and plant

Rubus eriocarpus is a Mesoamerican species of brambles in the rose family.

The species is a prickly, hairless shrub. The leaves are palmately compound with 3 or 5 leaflets, the undersides appearing whitish because of a coating of wax. The flowers are white and the fruits are cylindrical or spherical.

It grows in Central America and in central and southern Mexico, from Panama to Puebla.
