= Rubus liebmannii =

Scientific classification
- Kingdom: Plantae
- Clade: Embryophytes
- Clade: Tracheophytes
- Clade: Spermatophytes
- Clade: Angiosperms
- Clade: Eudicots
- Clade: Rosids
- Order: Rosales
- Family: Rosaceae
- Genus: Rubus
- Species: R. liebmannii

Binomial name
- Rubus liebmannii Focke 1874

Species of fruit and plant

Rubus liebmannii is a Mesoamerican species of brambles in the rose family.

It is a perennial plant growing to 3 metres (10 ft) tall, with scattered hairs and curved prickles. The leaves are compound with 3 leaflets. The flowers are rose-colored and the fruits are black.

The species is named for Danish botanist Frederik Michael Liebmann (1813–1856).

It grows in southern Mexico (Veracruz, Oaxaca, Chiapas) and Central America (Guatemala, Nicaragua).
