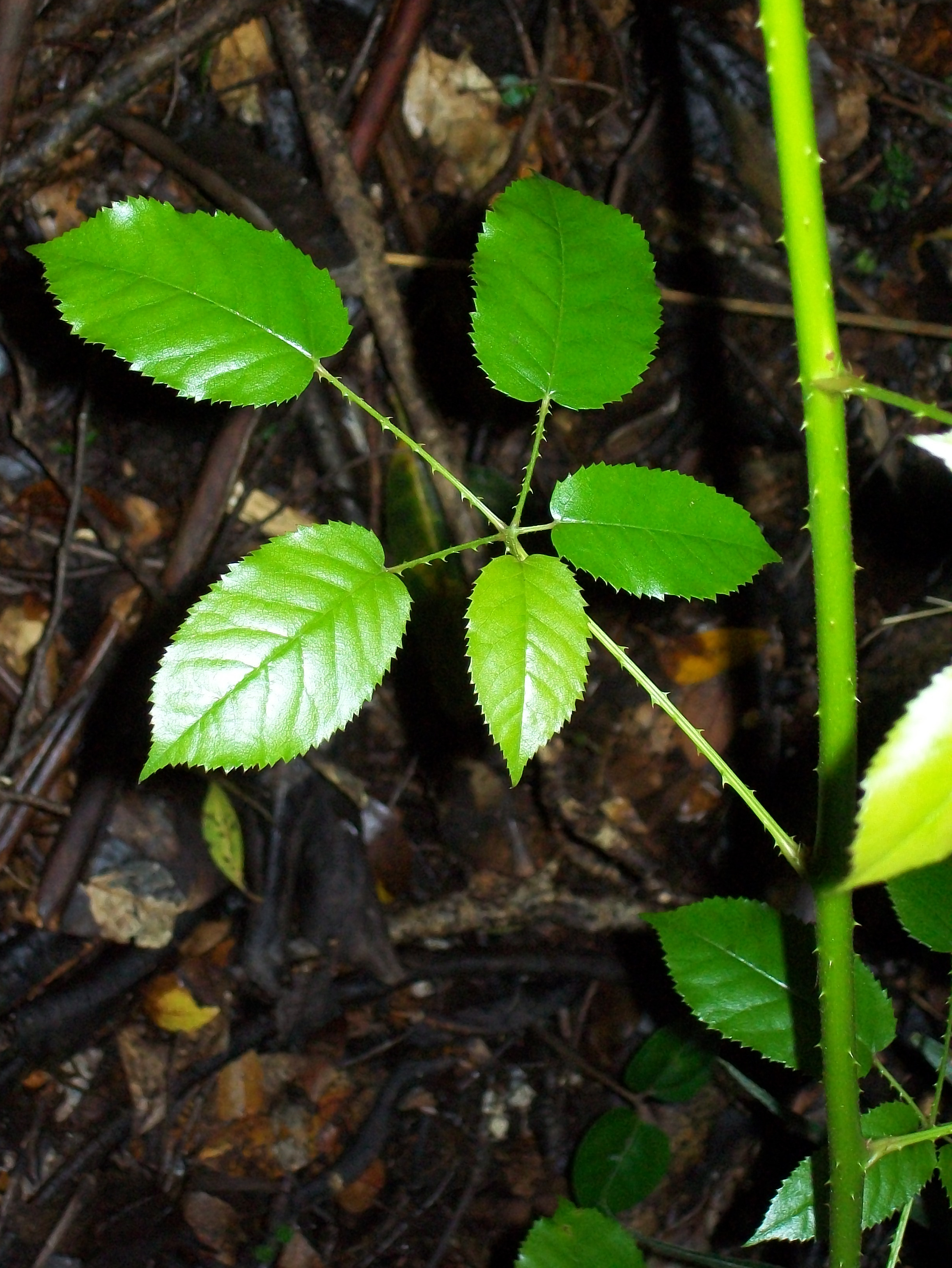
- near Burraga Swamp, Australia

Scientific classification
- Kingdom: Plantae
- Clade: Tracheophytes
- Clade: Angiosperms
- Clade: Eudicots
- Clade: Rosids
- Order: Rosales
- Family: Rosaceae
- Genus: Rubus
- Species: R. nebulosus

Binomial name
- Rubus nebulosus A.R.Bean

Synonyms
- Rubus sp. A sensu Harden & Rodd; Rubus sp. aff. moorei sensu Williams & Harden; Rubus moorei sensu Carolin & Tindale

= Rubus nebulosus =

Green-leaved bramble

Species of plant

Rubus nebulosus is a species of shrub in the genus Rubus in the family Rosaceae.
