= Rubus coriifolius =

Scientific classification
- Kingdom: Plantae
- Clade: Embryophytes
- Clade: Tracheophytes
- Clade: Spermatophytes
- Clade: Angiosperms
- Clade: Eudicots
- Clade: Rosids
- Order: Rosales
- Family: Rosaceae
- Genus: Rubus
- Species: R. coriifolius

Binomial name
- Rubus coriifolius Liebm. 1853 not Focke ex Donn. Sm. 1891 nor Kupcsok 1910

Synonyms
- Rubus floribundus Schltdl. 1839, illegitimate homonym not Weihe 1821

Species of fruit and plant

Rubus coriifolius is a Mesoamerican species of brambles in the rose family.

It is a perennial up to 2 metres (6 1/2 ft) tall, with hairs and sometimes a few small prickles. The leaves are compound with 3 or 5 thick, leathery leaflets. The flowers are white or rose-colored. The fruits are red or almost black.

It grows in central and southern Mexico (from Chiapas as far north as Tamaulipas) and Central America (Guatemala, Honduras, Nicaragua).
