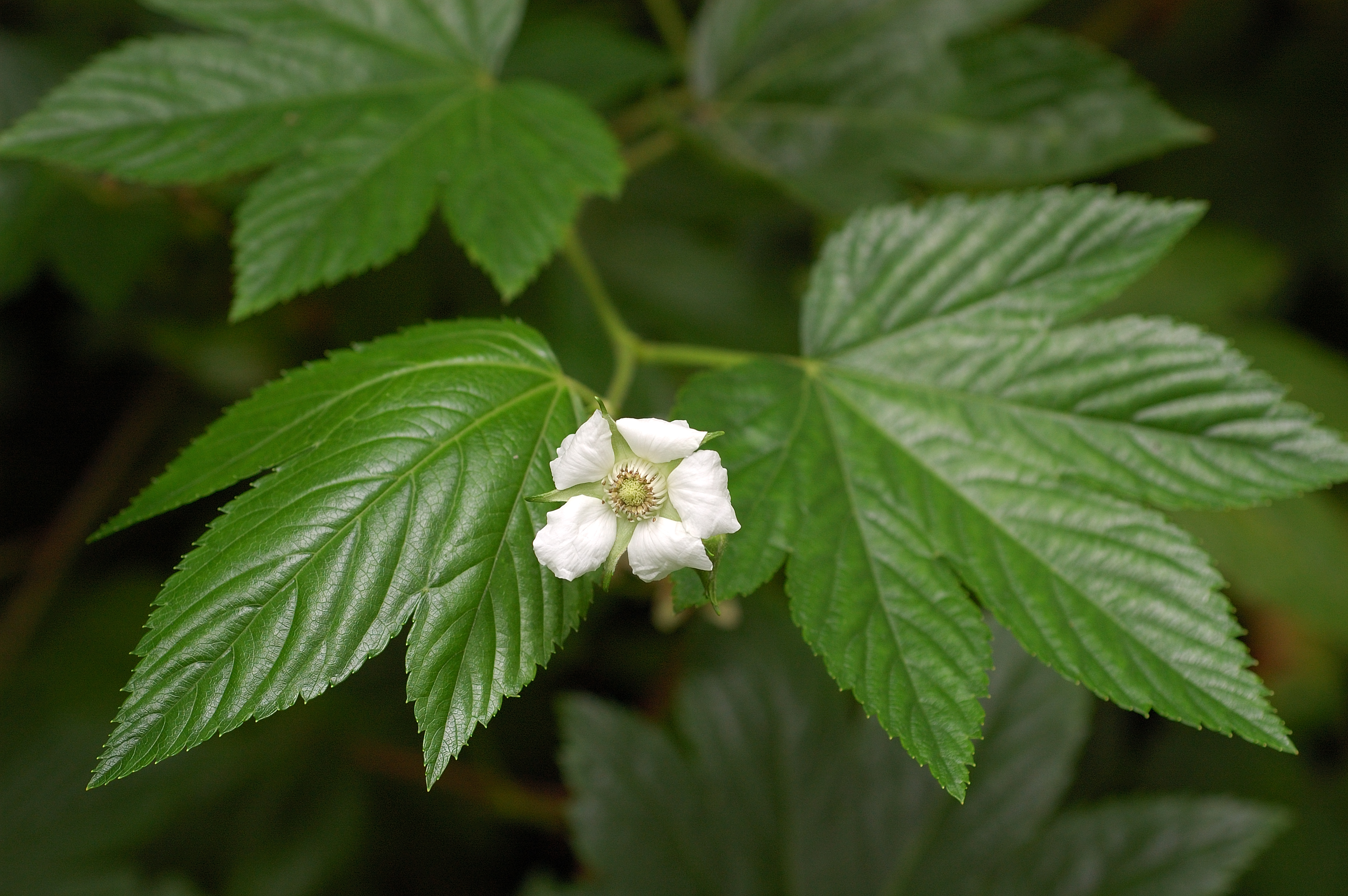

Scientific classification
- Kingdom: Plantae
- Clade: Embryophytes
- Clade: Tracheophytes
- Clade: Spermatophytes
- Clade: Angiosperms
- Clade: Eudicots
- Clade: Rosids
- Order: Rosales
- Family: Rosaceae
- Genus: Rubus
- Species: R. trifidus

Binomial name
- Rubus trifidus Thunb. 1784 not Steud. 1841

Synonyms
- Synonymy: Rubus aceroides Miq.; Rubus corchorifolius var. aceroides (Miq.) Kuntze; Rubus corchorifolius var. hydrastifolius (A.Gray) Kuntze; Rubus corchorifolius var. trifidus (Thunb.) Kuntze; Rubus hydrastifolius Maxim. ex A.Gray; Rubus pseudoacer var. flexuosus Y.C.Liu & F.Y.Lu; Rubus pseudoamericanus Kuntze; Rubus trifidus var. semiplenus Makino

= Rubus trifidus =

Species of fruit and plant

Rubus trifidus is a Japanese species of bramble, related to blackberries and raspberries.

Rubus trifidus has palmately lobed leaves with large teeth along the edges. The flowers are white and the fruits orange.
