= Rubus pringlei =

Scientific classification
- Kingdom: Plantae
- Clade: Embryophytes
- Clade: Tracheophytes
- Clade: Spermatophytes
- Clade: Angiosperms
- Clade: Eudicots
- Clade: Rosids
- Order: Rosales
- Family: Rosaceae
- Genus: Rubus
- Species: R. pringlei

Binomial name
- Rubus pringlei Rydb. 1913 not Focke 1914

Synonyms
- Rubus occidentalis var. grandiflorus Focke 1891 not Rubus grandiflorus Kaltenb. 1845; Rubus occidentalis var. incisus Schltdl. 1839; Rubus occidentalis var. mexicanus Focke

Species of fruit and plant

Rubus pringlei is a Mesoamerican species of bramble. It forms a hairless biennial up to 2 metres (6 1/2 feet) high, with curved prickles. The leaves are trifoliate. The flowers are white and the fruits dark purple.

The species grows in central and southern Mexico and also in Guatemala.
