= Rubus palmeri =

Scientific classification
- Kingdom: Plantae
- Clade: Embryophytes
- Clade: Tracheophytes
- Clade: Spermatophytes
- Clade: Angiosperms
- Clade: Eudicots
- Clade: Rosids
- Order: Rosales
- Family: Rosaceae
- Genus: Rubus
- Species: R. palmeri

Binomial name
- Rubus palmeri Rydb.

Species of fruit and plant

Rubus palmeri is a rare Mexican species of bramble.

It is a reclining perennial plant with stems up to 4 metres (13 feet) long, reclining on walls, rocks, or other vegetation. The stems are covered with wool and armed with curved prickles. The leaves are pinnately compound with 3 or 5 leaflets. The flowers are white and the fruits are dark purple.

The species has been found only in the Sierra Madre Occidental in Chihuahua, Durango, Jalisco, Nayarit, and Sonora in western Mexico.
