= Rubus uhdeanus =

Scientific classification
- Kingdom: Plantae
- Clade: Embryophytes
- Clade: Tracheophytes
- Clade: Spermatophytes
- Clade: Angiosperms
- Clade: Eudicots
- Clade: Rosids
- Order: Rosales
- Family: Rosaceae
- Genus: Rubus
- Species: R. uhdeanus

Binomial name
- Rubus uhdeanus Focke 1874

Species of fruit and plant

Rubus uhdeanus is a Mexican species of bramble.

It forms a perennial plant with light hair and a few small curved prickles. The leaves are compound with three leaflets. The flowers are white or pink. The fruits are black and elongated.

It is native to southern Mexico.
