= Rubus humistratus =

Scientific classification
- Kingdom: Plantae
- Clade: Embryophytes
- Clade: Tracheophytes
- Clade: Spermatophytes
- Clade: Angiosperms
- Clade: Eudicots
- Clade: Rosids
- Order: Rosales
- Family: Rosaceae
- Genus: Rubus
- Species: R. humistratus

Binomial name
- Rubus humistratus Steud. 1841

Synonyms
- Rubus humifusus Schltdl. 1839, illegitimate homonym not Weihe & Nees 1821

Species of fruit and plant

Rubus humistratus is a Mesoamerican species of flowering plant in the rose family. It widespread across much of Mexico and Central America from Nuevo León to Costa Rica.
