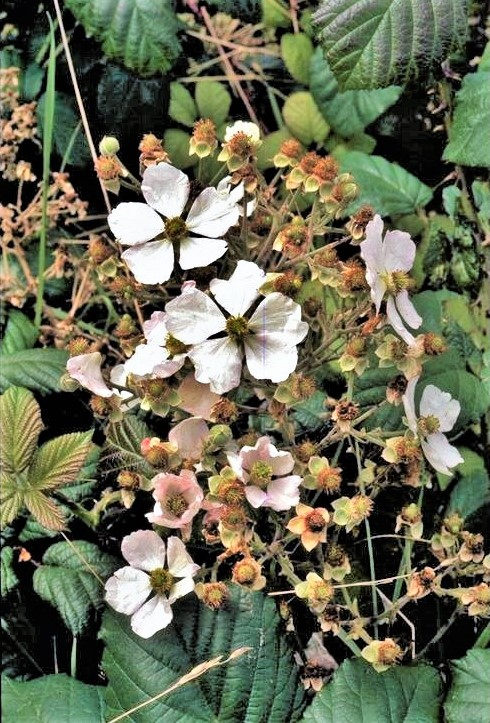

Scientific classification
- Kingdom: Plantae
- Clade: Embryophytes
- Clade: Tracheophytes
- Clade: Spermatophytes
- Clade: Angiosperms
- Clade: Eudicots
- Clade: Rosids
- Order: Rosales
- Family: Rosaceae
- Genus: Rubus
- Species: R. hochstetterorum

Binomial name
- Rubus hochstetterorum Seub. 1844

Synonyms
- Rubus grandiflorus Seub. & Hochst.

= Rubus hochstetterorum =

Species of fruit and plant

Rubus hochstetterorum is a rare species of flowering plant in the rose family. It has been found only in the Azores Islands in the North Atlantic, part of Portugal.
