= Rubus velox =

Scientific classification
- Kingdom: Plantae
- Clade: Embryophytes
- Clade: Tracheophytes
- Clade: Spermatophytes
- Clade: Angiosperms
- Clade: Eudicots
- Clade: Rosids
- Order: Rosales
- Family: Rosaceae
- Genus: Rubus
- Species: R. velox

Binomial name
- Rubus velox L.H.Bailey

Species of fruit and plant

Rubus velox is a rare North American species of bramble. It has been found only in Texas.

The genetics of Rubus is extremely complex, so it is difficult to decide which groups should be recognized as species. As there are many rare species with limited ranges such as this, further study is needed to clarify the taxonomy.
