= Rubus sapidus =

Scientific classification
- Kingdom: Plantae
- Clade: Embryophytes
- Clade: Tracheophytes
- Clade: Spermatophytes
- Clade: Angiosperms
- Clade: Eudicots
- Clade: Rosids
- Order: Rosales
- Family: Rosaceae
- Genus: Rubus
- Species: R. sapidus

Binomial name
- Rubus sapidus Schltdl.

Species of fruit and plant

Rubus sapidus is a Mesoamerican species of bramble.

It forms an erect or arching perennial plant with stems up to 2.5 metres (8 feet) long. The stems are covered with wool and armed with curved prickles. Leaves on the stems are compound with 5 leaflets, leathery with soft hairs on the underside. Leaves on flower stalks are either simple or compound with 3 leaflets. The flowers are white. The fruits are black and spherical.

The species grows in southern Mexico (Chiapas, Oaxaca) and Central America (Guatemala, Honduras, Nicaragua).
