= Rubus vigil =

Scientific classification
- Kingdom: Plantae
- Clade: Embryophytes
- Clade: Tracheophytes
- Clade: Angiosperms
- Clade: Eudicots
- Clade: Rosids
- Order: Rosales
- Family: Rosaceae
- Genus: Rubus
- Species: R. vigil

Binomial name
- Rubus vigil L.H.Bailey 1925

Synonyms
- Rubus vigilis L.H.Bailey; Rubus ambigens Fernald

Species of fruit and plant

Rubus vigil is a rare North American species of brambles in the rose family. It has been found only in the states of Virginia and North Carolina in the eastern United States.

The genetics of Rubus is extremely complex, so that it is difficult to decide on which groups should be recognized as species. There are many rare species with limited ranges such as this. Further study is suggested to clarify the taxonomy.
