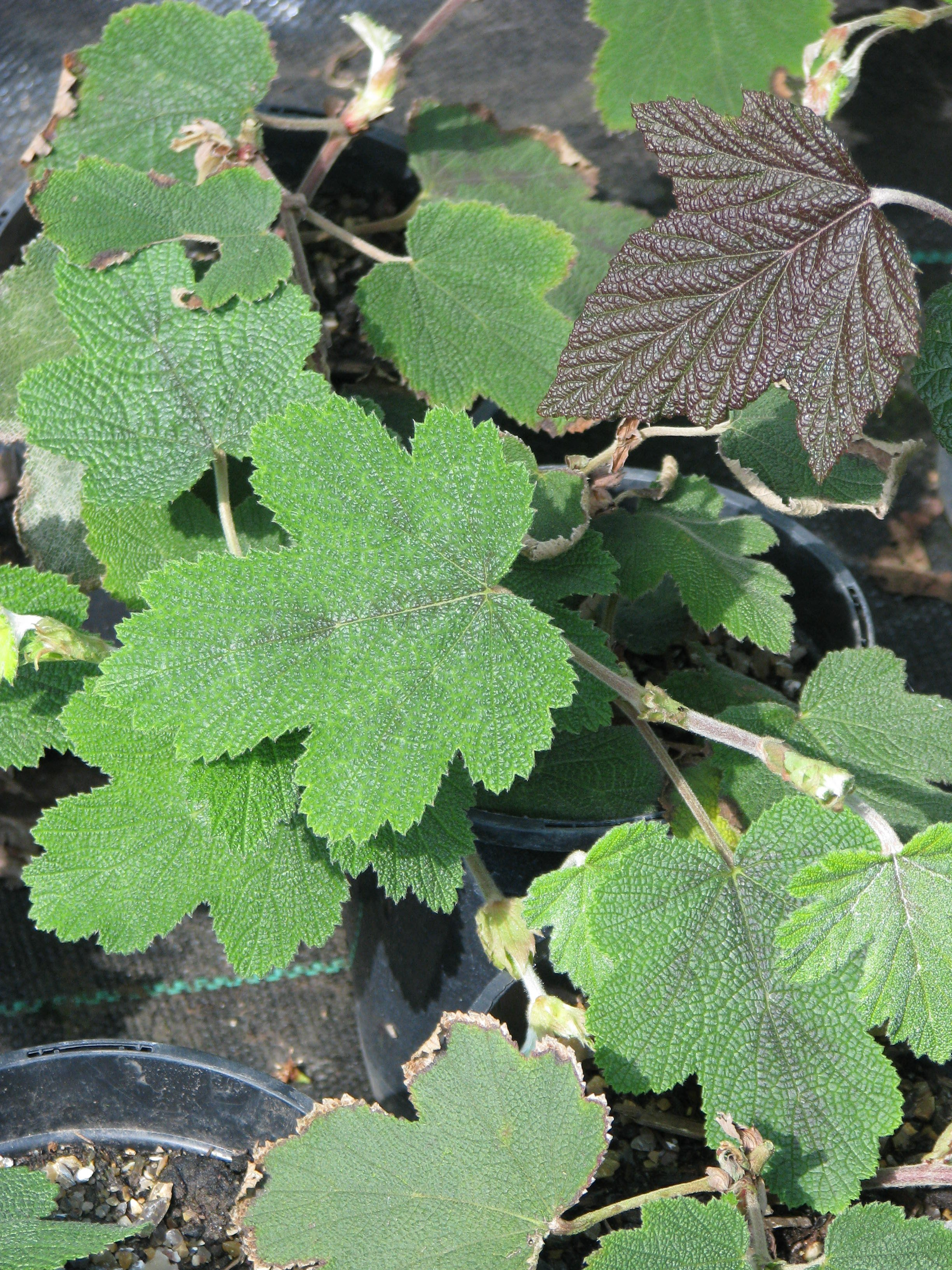
- Potted specimen
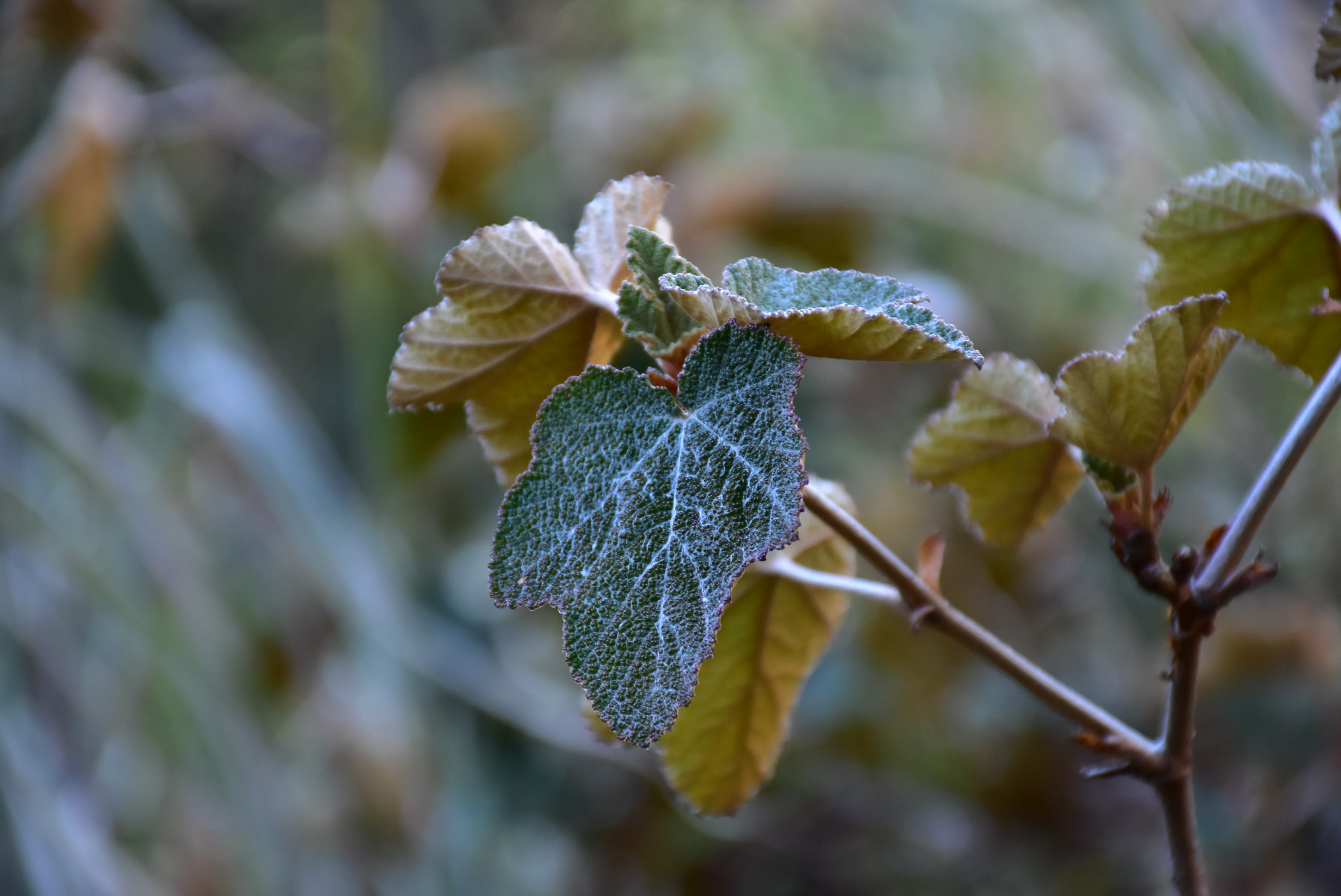
- Adaxial surfaces of leaves are rugose

Scientific classification
- Kingdom: Plantae
- Clade: Embryophytes
- Clade: Tracheophytes
- Clade: Spermatophytes
- Clade: Angiosperms
- Clade: Eudicots
- Clade: Rosids
- Order: Rosales
- Family: Rosaceae
- Genus: Rubus
- Species: R. formosensis

Binomial name
- Rubus formosensis Kuntze

Synonyms
- Rubus formosanus Maxim. ex Focke; Rubus moluccanus var. formosensis (Kuntze) Kuntze; Rubus nantoensis Hayata; Rubus randaiensis Hayata; Rubus rubribracteatus F.P.Metcalf; Rubus rugosissimus Hayata

= Rubus formosensis =

Species of plant

Rubus formosensis, the Formosan raspberry or Formosan bramble, is an Asian species of flowering plant in the family Rosaceae.

It is a thornless shrub with a restrained climbing habit, growing up to 2.5 metres (8 ft) in height. The evergreen leaves are lobed and veined. The flowers are white and the fruit is orange-red.

The species is native to southeastern China (Guangdong and Guangxi), and Taiwan. It is found at a wide range of elevations, generally in habitats that have limited competition from other plants.

The plant is available from commercial suppliers, being noted for its attractive leaves.
