= Rubus laegaardii =

Conservation status
- Vulnerable (IUCN 3.1)

Scientific classification
- Kingdom: Plantae
- Clade: Tracheophytes
- Clade: Angiosperms
- Clade: Eudicots
- Clade: Rosids
- Order: Rosales
- Family: Rosaceae
- Genus: Rubus
- Species: R. laegaardii

Binomial name
- Rubus laegaardii Romol.

Species of fruit and plant

Rubus laegaardii is a species of plant in the family Rosaceae. It is endemic to Ecuador.
