= Rubus dorcheei =

Scientific classification
- Kingdom: Plantae
- Clade: Embryophytes
- Clade: Tracheophytes
- Clade: Spermatophytes
- Clade: Angiosperms
- Clade: Eudicots
- Clade: Rosids
- Order: Rosales
- Family: Rosaceae
- Genus: Rubus
- Species: R. dorcheei

Binomial name
- Rubus dorcheei Rokaya & S.Subedi

Species of plant

Rubus dorcheei is an Asian species of thorny fruiting shrub in Rosaceae family. First described in 2021, it is endemic to Nepal.

== Description ==
It closely resembles similar taxa like Rubus kumaonensis and Rubus rugosus. It can usually be distinguished from them by its taller height. In addition, according to one source, it has "both leaf surfaces green, upper surface more hairy than lower surface, leaf blade margins biserrate, sepal deltoid, tomentose on both sides, margin with 7–10 appendages, apex bifurcate or trifurcate, petals spathulate, and calyx, corolla and stamens persistent in fruit." It grows as tall as 10 metres (33 ft) in height and flowers from August to November while fruiting/ripening from October–November.

== Taxonomy ==
The samples of the new plant were collected for the first time from Shivapuri Nagarjun National Park in 2018 at an altitude of 1,930 m (6,330 ft). The taxon is named after plant enthusiast La Dorchee Sherpa who first came across the plant. The published name was Rubus dorcheae, but as La Dorchee Sherpa is a man, the epithet was corrected to dorcheei.

== Distribution and habitat ==
It is endemic to Nepal, found only in the subtropical forests of Kathmandu.
