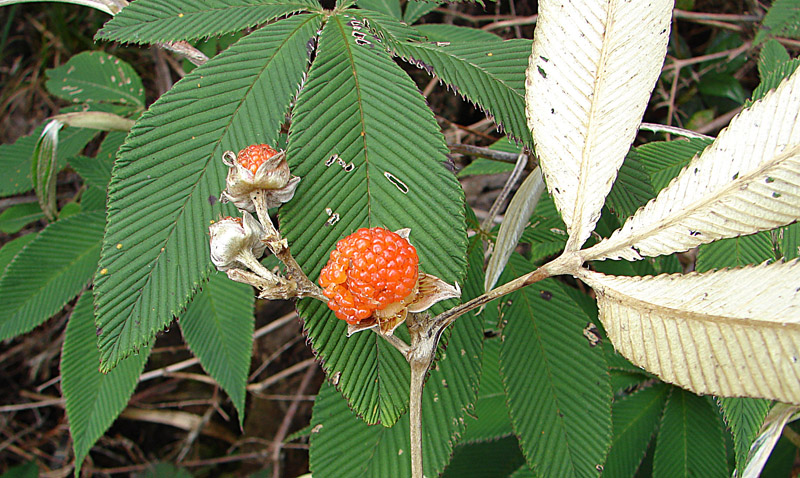

Scientific classification
- Kingdom: Plantae
- Clade: Embryophytes
- Clade: Tracheophytes
- Clade: Spermatophytes
- Clade: Angiosperms
- Clade: Eudicots
- Clade: Rosids
- Order: Rosales
- Family: Rosaceae
- Genus: Rubus
- Species: R. lineatus

Binomial name
- Rubus lineatus Reinw. ex Blume

= Rubus lineatus =

Species of plant

Rubus lineatus (syn. R. pulcherrimus) is an Asian species of bramble.

== Description ==
Growing from suckering stems to a maximum height and spread of 4 metres (13 feet), the semi-evergreen shrub has large, handsome palmate leaves with a contrasting white underside. Small white flowers appear in spring and summer, followed by red or yellow fruits in autumn, which require full sun to ripen.

== Etymology ==
The Latin specific epithet lineatus ("lined" or "striped") refers to the deep veining of the leaves.

== Distribution and habitat ==
It is native to eastern and southern Asia, in Tibet, China (Yunnan), Bhutan, north east India (Sikkim), Indonesia, Malaysia, Myanmar, Nepal and north Vietnam.

== Uses ==
The ripened fruits may be edible and the plant is cultivated as an ornamental for temperate climates.
