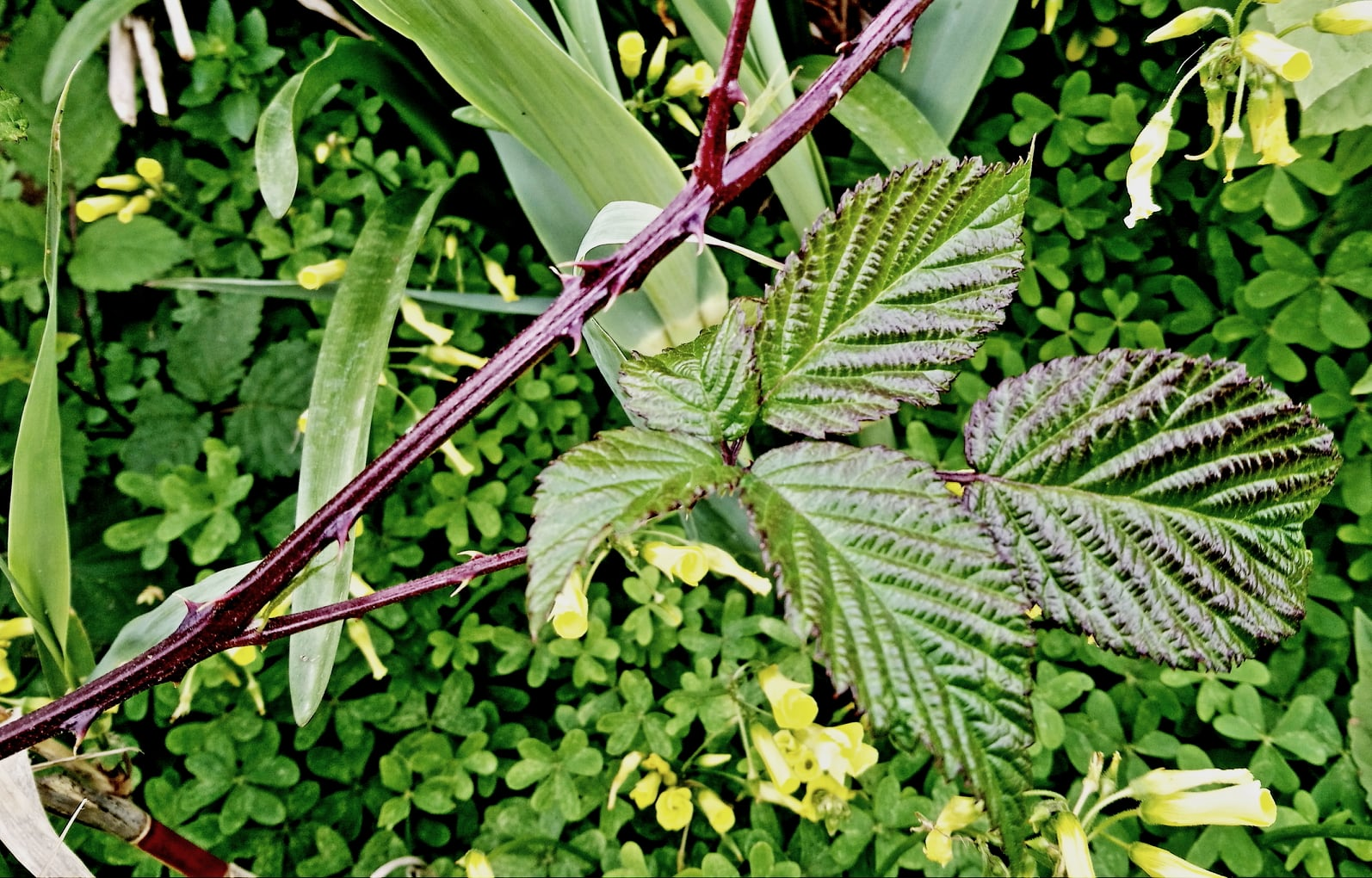
- On Madeira

Scientific classification
- Kingdom: Plantae
- Clade: Embryophytes
- Clade: Tracheophytes
- Clade: Spermatophytes
- Clade: Angiosperms
- Clade: Eudicots
- Clade: Rosids
- Order: Rosales
- Family: Rosaceae
- Genus: Rubus
- Species: R. × suspiciosus

Binomial name
- Rubus × suspiciosus Menezes

= Rubus × suspiciosus =

Species of plant in the rose family

Rubus × suspiciosus (or Rubus suspiciosus) is a naturally occurring hybrid species of flowering plant in the blackberry genus Rubus, family Rosaceae. Its parents are thought to be Rubus bollei and R. ulmifolius. It is native to Madeira and the Canary Islands.
