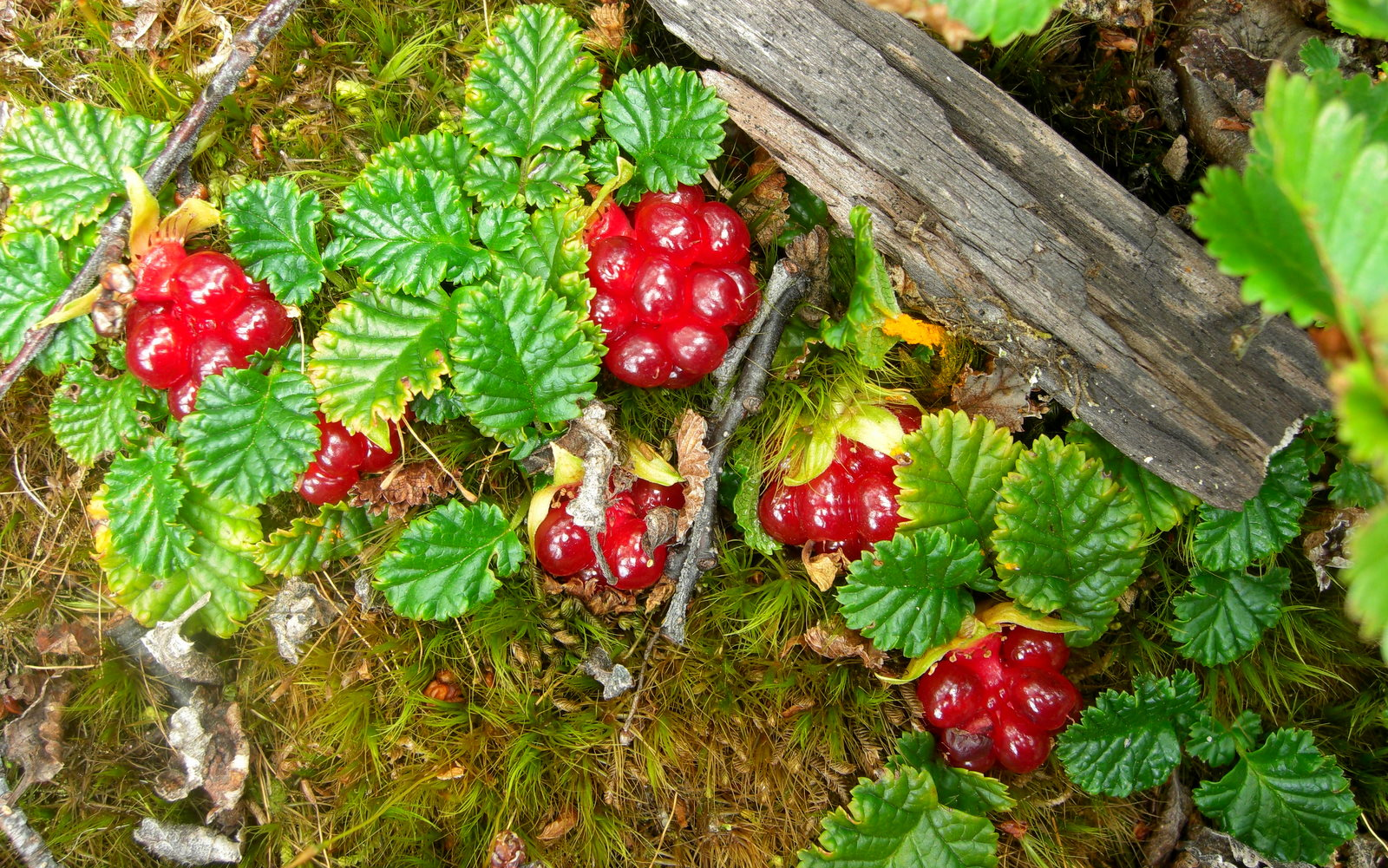

Scientific classification
- Kingdom: Plantae
- Clade: Embryophytes
- Clade: Tracheophytes
- Clade: Spermatophytes
- Clade: Angiosperms
- Clade: Eudicots
- Clade: Rosids
- Order: Rosales
- Family: Rosaceae
- Genus: Rubus
- Species: R. geoides

Binomial name
- Rubus geoides Sm. 1789

Synonyms
- Dalibarda geoides (Sm.) Pers.

= Rubus geoides =

Species of fruit and plant

Rubus geoides is a South American species of flowering plant in the rose family. It is a very small, spineless, trailing herb rarely more than 10 centimetres (4 in) tall, with trifoliate leaves.

It has been found only in southern South America, in the provinces of Tierra del Fuego, Santa Cruz, Río Negro, and Neuquén in Argentina, the adjacent Magallanes Region of Chile, and the Falkland Islands.
