= Rubus alnifolius =

Scientific classification
- Kingdom: Plantae
- Clade: Embryophytes
- Clade: Tracheophytes
- Clade: Angiosperms
- Clade: Eudicots
- Clade: Rosids
- Order: Rosales
- Family: Rosaceae
- Genus: Rubus
- Species: R. alnifolius

Binomial name
- Rubus alnifolius Rydb. 1913

Species of fruit and plant

Rubus alnifolius is an uncommon species of bramble in the rose family.

The trailing or drooping perennial plant has curved prickles. The leaves are complex, with three thick, leathery leaflets. The fruits are oblong and dark purple.

The species has been found only in the state of Veracruz in eastern Mexico.
