= Rubus chloocladus =

Scientific classification
- Kingdom: Plantae
- Clade: Embryophytes
- Clade: Tracheophytes
- Clade: Spermatophytes
- Clade: Angiosperms
- Clade: Eudicots
- Clade: Rosids
- Order: Rosales
- Family: Rosaceae
- Genus: Rubus
- Species: R. chloocladus

Binomial name
- Rubus chloocladus W.C.R.Watson 1956

Synonyms
- Synonymy: Rubus pubescens Weihe 1824, illegitimate homonym not Raf. 1811; Rubus cryptadenus var. pubescens (Weihe) Dumort.; Rubus discolor var. major Sond.; Rubus discolor var. pubescens (Weihe ex Bluff & Fingerh.) Bab.; Rubus hedycarpus subsp. pubescens (Weihe ex Bluff & Fingerh.) Focke; Rubus hedycarpus var. pubescens (Weihe ex Bluff & Fingerh.) E.H.L.Krause; Rubus pubescens f. angustifolius G.Braun; Rubus pubescens f. latifolius G.Braun; Rubus sanctus var. pubescens (Weihe ex Bluff & Fingerh.) Kuntze; Rubus thyrsoideus var. pubescens (Weihe ex Bluff & Fingerh.) Fisch.-Oost.; Rubus vulgaris f. pubescens Weihe ex Bluff & Fingerh.; Rubus vulgaris var. pubescens (Weihe ex Bluff & Fingerh.) Bab.

Species of flowering plant

Rubus chloocladus is a European plant species in the rose family.

It is a woody perennial herb sometimes as much as 2 meters (80 inches) tall. The leaves are palmately compound, each leaflet broadly egg-shaped with teeth along the edge.

It is found in central and western Europe (Germany, Netherlands, Italy, etc.).
