= Rubus eggersii =

Scientific classification
- Kingdom: Plantae
- Clade: Embryophytes
- Clade: Tracheophytes
- Clade: Spermatophytes
- Clade: Angiosperms
- Clade: Eudicots
- Clade: Rosids
- Order: Rosales
- Family: Rosaceae
- Genus: Rubus
- Species: R. eggersii

Binomial name
- Rubus eggersii (Focke) Rydb. 1913

Synonyms
- Rubus florulentus var. eggersii Focke 1890

Species of fruit and plant

Rubus eggersii is a Caribbean species of brambles in the rose family.

The species is a reclining perennial with curved prickles. The leaves are compound with three leaflets. The flowers are white and the fruits are black.

It has been found only in the Dominican Republic.
