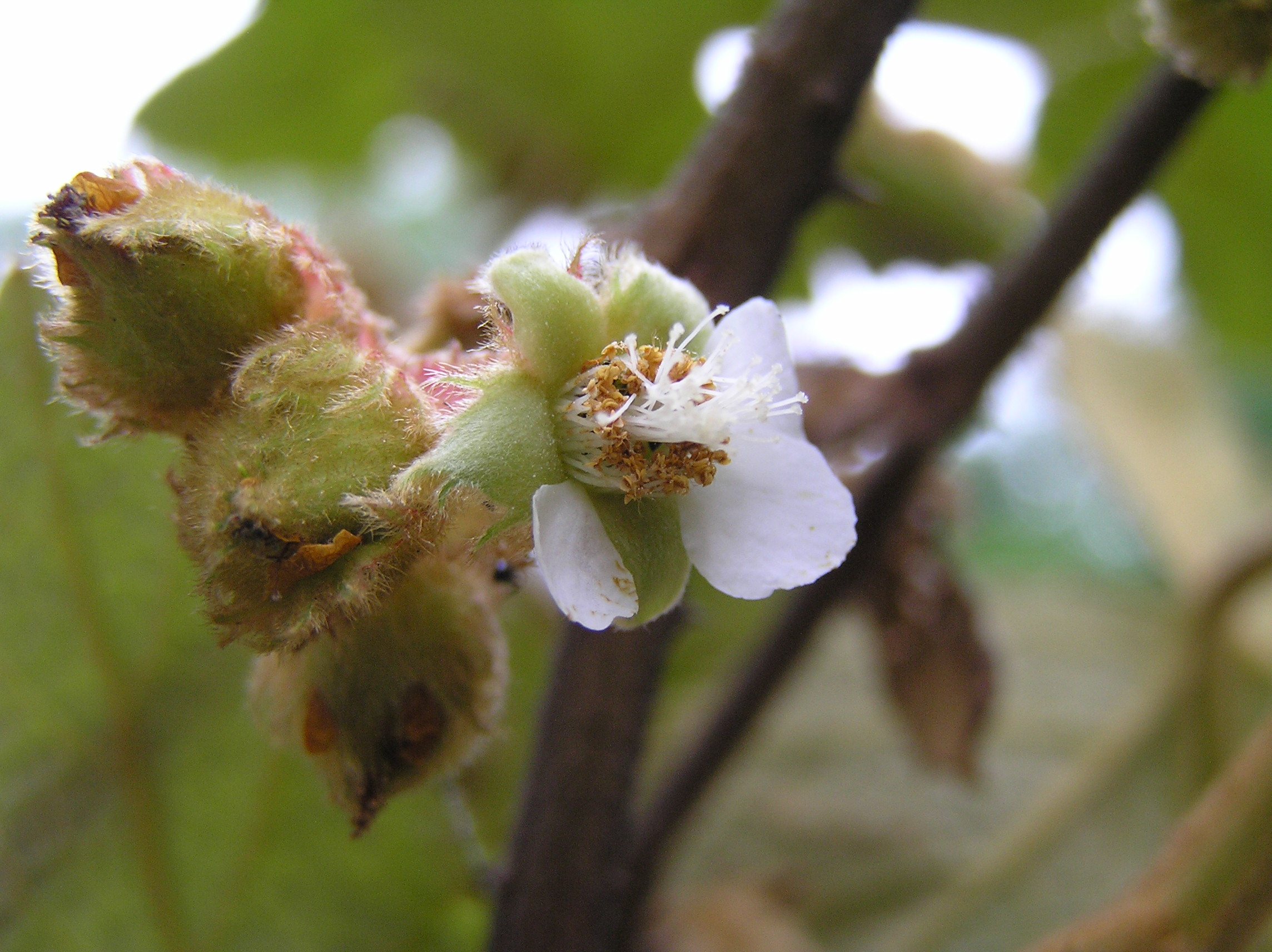

Scientific classification
- Kingdom: Plantae
- Clade: Embryophytes
- Clade: Tracheophytes
- Clade: Spermatophytes
- Clade: Angiosperms
- Clade: Eudicots
- Clade: Rosids
- Order: Rosales
- Family: Rosaceae
- Genus: Rubus
- Species: R. reflexus

Binomial name
- Rubus reflexus Ker Gawl.

Synonyms
- Rubus esquirolii H.Lév.; Rubus axilliflorens Cardot; Rubus hui Diels ex Hu; Rubus reflexus var. orogenes Hand.-Mazz.

= Rubus reflexus =

Species of fruit and plant

Rubus reflexus is a Chinese species of bramble. It forms a prickly shrub up to 2 metres (6 feet 6 1/2 inches) tall. The leaves are simple (not compound), palmately lobed, and covered with hairs. The flowers are white and the fruits red.

The species has been found only in China (Provinces of Fujian, Guangdong, Guangxi, Guizhou, Hubei, Hunan, Jiangxi, Taiwan, Yunnan, and Zhejiang).
