= Rubus wahlbergii =

Scientific classification
- Kingdom: Plantae
- Clade: Tracheophytes
- Clade: Angiosperms
- Clade: Eudicots
- Clade: Rosids
- Order: Rosales
- Family: Rosaceae
- Genus: Rubus
- Species: R. wahlbergii

Binomial name
- Rubus wahlbergii Arrh.

Species of flowering plant

Rubus wahlbergii is a species of flowering plant belonging to the family Rosaceae.

It is native to Europe.
