= Rubus loxensis =

Scientific classification
- Kingdom: Plantae
- Clade: Embryophytes
- Clade: Tracheophytes
- Clade: Spermatophytes
- Clade: Angiosperms
- Clade: Eudicots
- Clade: Rosids
- Order: Rosales
- Family: Rosaceae
- Genus: Rubus
- Species: R. loxensis

Binomial name
- Rubus loxensis Benth.

Synonyms
- Rubus extensus Fritsch; Rubus loxensis f. parvifolius Kuntze

Species of plant in the rose family

Rubus loxensis is a South American species of bramble, part of the rose family.

The species' closest relative is Rubus adenothallus.

Rubus loxensis is native to Ecuador, Peru, and Bolivia.
