= Rubus durus =

Scientific classification
- Kingdom: Plantae
- Clade: Embryophytes
- Clade: Tracheophytes
- Clade: Spermatophytes
- Clade: Angiosperms
- Clade: Eudicots
- Clade: Rosids
- Order: Rosales
- Family: Rosaceae
- Genus: Rubus
- Species: R. durus

Binomial name
- Rubus durus C.Wright 1869

Species of fruit and plant

Rubus durus is a Cuban species of brambles in the rose family.

It is a reclining perennial with curved prickles. The leaves are compound with three leaflets. The flowers are white and the fruits are black.
