= Rubus costaricanus =

Scientific classification
- Kingdom: Plantae
- Clade: Embryophytes
- Clade: Tracheophytes
- Clade: Spermatophytes
- Clade: Angiosperms
- Clade: Eudicots
- Clade: Rosids
- Order: Rosales
- Family: Rosaceae
- Genus: Rubus
- Species: R. costaricanus

Binomial name
- Rubus costaricanus Liebm. 1853

Species of fruit and plant

Rubus costaricanus is a Mesoamerican species of brambles in the rose family.

It is a shrub sometimes more than 3 metres (10 ft) tall, with curved prickles. The leaves are compound with 3 or 5 leaflets.

It grows in southern Mexico and Central America, from Chiapas to Panama.
