= Rubus irasuensis =

Scientific classification
- Kingdom: Plantae
- Clade: Embryophytes
- Clade: Tracheophytes
- Clade: Spermatophytes
- Clade: Angiosperms
- Clade: Eudicots
- Clade: Rosids
- Order: Rosales
- Family: Rosaceae
- Genus: Rubus
- Species: R. irasuensis

Binomial name
- Rubus irasuensis Liebm. 1853

Species of fruit and plant

Rubus irasuensis is a Mesoamerican species of bramble in the rose family. It is a perennial with stems up to 150 centimetres (59 in) tall, with bristles and curved prickles. The leaves are compound with 3 or 5 leaflets. The flowers are pink and the fruits are cylindrical.

It grows in southern Mexico (Chiapas) and in Central America (Guatemala, Honduras, Nicaragua, Costa Rica).
