= Rubus macrogongylus =

Scientific classification
- Kingdom: Plantae
- Clade: Embryophytes
- Clade: Tracheophytes
- Clade: Spermatophytes
- Clade: Angiosperms
- Clade: Eudicots
- Clade: Rosids
- Order: Rosales
- Family: Rosaceae
- Genus: Rubus
- Species: R. macrogongylus

Binomial name
- Rubus macrogongylus Focke 1911

Species of fruit and plant

Rubus macrogongylus is a Mesoamerican species of bramble. It forms an arching shrub up to 250 centimetres (8 feet) tall, with wool and curved prickles. The leaves are compound with 3 leathery leaflets. The fruits are black.

It grows in the State of Chiapas in southern Mexico as well as in the Central American nations of Guatemala and Nicaragua.
