= Rubus pumilus =

Scientific classification
- Kingdom: Plantae
- Clade: Embryophytes
- Clade: Tracheophytes
- Clade: Spermatophytes
- Clade: Angiosperms
- Clade: Eudicots
- Clade: Rosids
- Order: Rosales
- Family: Rosaceae
- Genus: Rubus
- Species: R. pumilus

Binomial name
- Rubus pumilus Focke

Species of fruit and plant

Rubus pumilus is an uncommon North American species of bramble.

The plant is a creeping perennial, rooting at nodes, with prickles. The leaves are simple (not compound), usually with rounded blades but sometimes three-lobed. The flowers are white and the fruit red.

The complex genetics of Rubus make it difficult to decide which groups should be recognized as species. As there are many rare species with such limited ranges, further study is needed to clarify the taxonomy.

The species is native to the State of Chihuahua in northern Mexico.
