= Rubus prosper =

Scientific classification
- Kingdom: Plantae
- Clade: Embryophytes
- Clade: Tracheophytes
- Clade: Spermatophytes
- Clade: Angiosperms
- Clade: Eudicots
- Clade: Rosids
- Order: Rosales
- Family: Rosaceae
- Genus: Rubus
- Species: R. prosper

Binomial name
- Rubus prosper L.H.Bailey

Species of fruit and plant

Rubus prosper is a rare North American species of bramble.

The genetics of Rubus are extremely complex, making it difficult to decide which groups should be recognized as species. As there are many rare species with limited ranges, further study is suggested to clarify the taxonomy.

The species has been found in Rhode Island in the northeastern United States.
