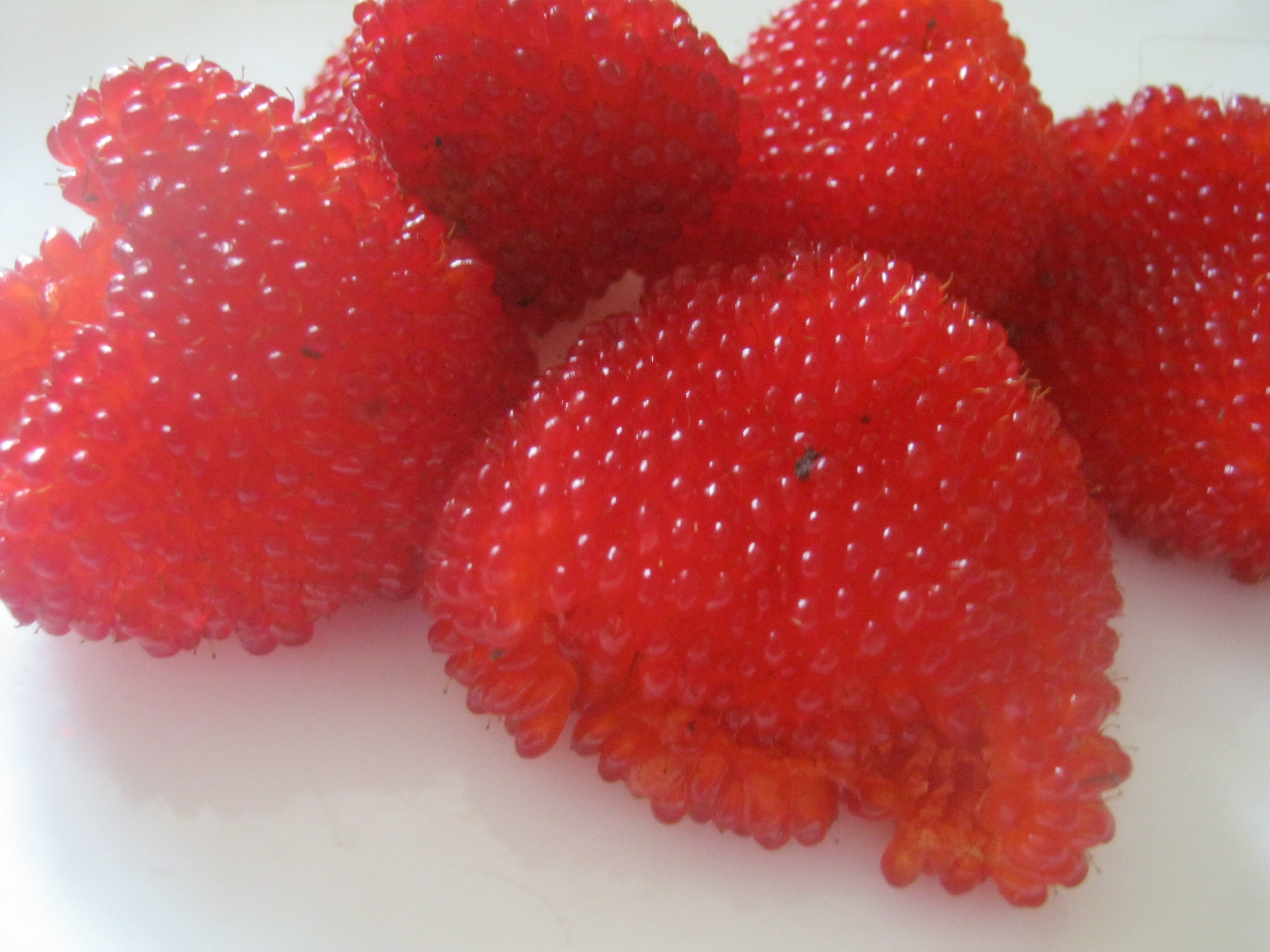
- Fruit in Lithuania

Scientific classification
- Kingdom: Plantae
- Clade: Tracheophytes
- Clade: Angiosperms
- Clade: Eudicots
- Clade: Rosids
- Order: Rosales
- Family: Rosaceae
- Genus: Rubus
- Subgenus: Rubus subg. Idaeobatus
- Species: R. illecebrosus

Binomial name
- Rubus illecebrosus Focke 1899

Synonyms
- Rubus commersonii var. illecebrosus (Focke) Makino; Rubus sorbifolius hort. ex Wittm.; Rubus tokinibara (H.Hara) Naruh.

= Rubus illecebrosus =

Berry and plant

Rubus illecebrosus is a red-fruited species of Rubus originally from Japan. Common names include balloon berry and strawberry raspberry.

== Description ==
Rubus illecebrosus is a thorny shrub growing up to 150 centimetres (5 feet) tall. The leaves are pinnately compound.

The flowers are produced either singly or in clumps of 2–3, each with 5 petals up to 18 millimetres (23/32 inch) long, longer than those of most related species. The fruits are also unusually large for the genus, each oblong, red, up to 2 cm (3/4 in) long with 50–100 drupelets.

== Distribution and habitat ==
Originally from Japan (where it is called バライチゴ, literally 'roseberry'), it is also very popular in some European countries like Lithuania.

It has become sparingly naturalized in scattered locations in Canada, the United States, Pitikosk (Vörå, Finland) and South America.
