= Rubus humulifolius =

- Leaves and fruit, Belorechensky, Irkutsk, Russia

Scientific classification
- Kingdom: Plantae
- Clade: Tracheophytes
- Clade: Angiosperms
- Clade: Eudicots
- Clade: Rosids
- Order: Rosales
- Family: Rosaceae
- Genus: Rubus
- Species: R. humulifolius

Binomial name
- Rubus humulifolius C.A.Mey.

Species of flowering plant

Rubus humulifolius is a species of flowering plant in the family Rosaceae, native to Finland and northern Russia and China.

== Description ==
Rubus humulifolius is a small, perennial herb typically 10 to 30 cm (3.9 to 11.8 in) tall with three- to five-lobed, doubly serrated, compound leaves resembling those of hop. It spreads mainly through vegetative propagation using its underground rhizomes, as its fruits are often underdeveloped or not produced whatsoever. Its flowers are white and modest in appearance, and typically flowers in June or July.

== Distribution and habitat ==
Its native range extends throughout Russia, spanning from Khabarovsk Krai in the east to the western edge of Vologda Oblast, with an additional isolated population in central Finland.

The Finnish population was likely established between 1700 and 1800 by Russian military camps during either the Great Northern War or the Finnish War. Beginning in the 1920s its habitat was gradually degraded by development of nearby land. By 1957, its numbers had dwindled to just 15 ramets growing in ditches. Five shoots of R. humulifolius were rescued just two hours before the land was bulldozed to make way for construction, causing its extirpation in the wild in Finland. They were transplanted to a garden and unsuccessful attempts at reintroduction to the wild took place for the next 30 years.

In 1986, a new ex situ conservation method, micropropagation, was attempted. Two years later R. humulifolius became the first example of micropropagation being used to save an extirpated species. It was reintroduced to a new site in Finland close to its old habitat, and its new site was made a nature preserve.

As of 2026, in Finland R. humulifolius is conserved in its nature preserve as well as in several Finnish botanical gardens.

== Etymology ==
The specific epithet humulifolius comes from the Latin humulus, referring to hop, and folium, meaning leaf.
