= Rubus mortensenii =

Scientific classification
- Kingdom: Plantae
- Clade: Embryophytes
- Clade: Tracheophytes
- Clade: Spermatophytes
- Clade: Angiosperms
- Clade: Eudicots
- Clade: Rosids
- Order: Rosales
- Family: Rosaceae
- Genus: Rubus
- Species: R. mortensenii

Binomial name
- Rubus mortensenii E.H.L.Krause

Synonyms
- Rubus centiformis var. mortensenii Frid. & Gelert; Rubus lindblomii Westerl.

Species of flowering plant

Rubus mortensenii is a European species of bramble.

== Description ==
The plant has sharply angular reddish turions with thorns 2–4 millimetres (1/16–3/16 inch) in length. The limb has regular rounded teeth. The final leaflet has a clearly distinct apex, long and thin, around 15 mm (5/8 in). Its upper face has between 5–100 hairs per square centimetre. Its lower face is greyish-green to gray in color. The bright pink flowers are 8–10 mm long.

== Distribution and habitat ==
It is native to Sweden, Denmark and Germany. The species is common, occurring on non-calcareous soil, in thickets, clearings, and the edges of wood.

== See also ==
- Jardins de Valloires – Garden in France
