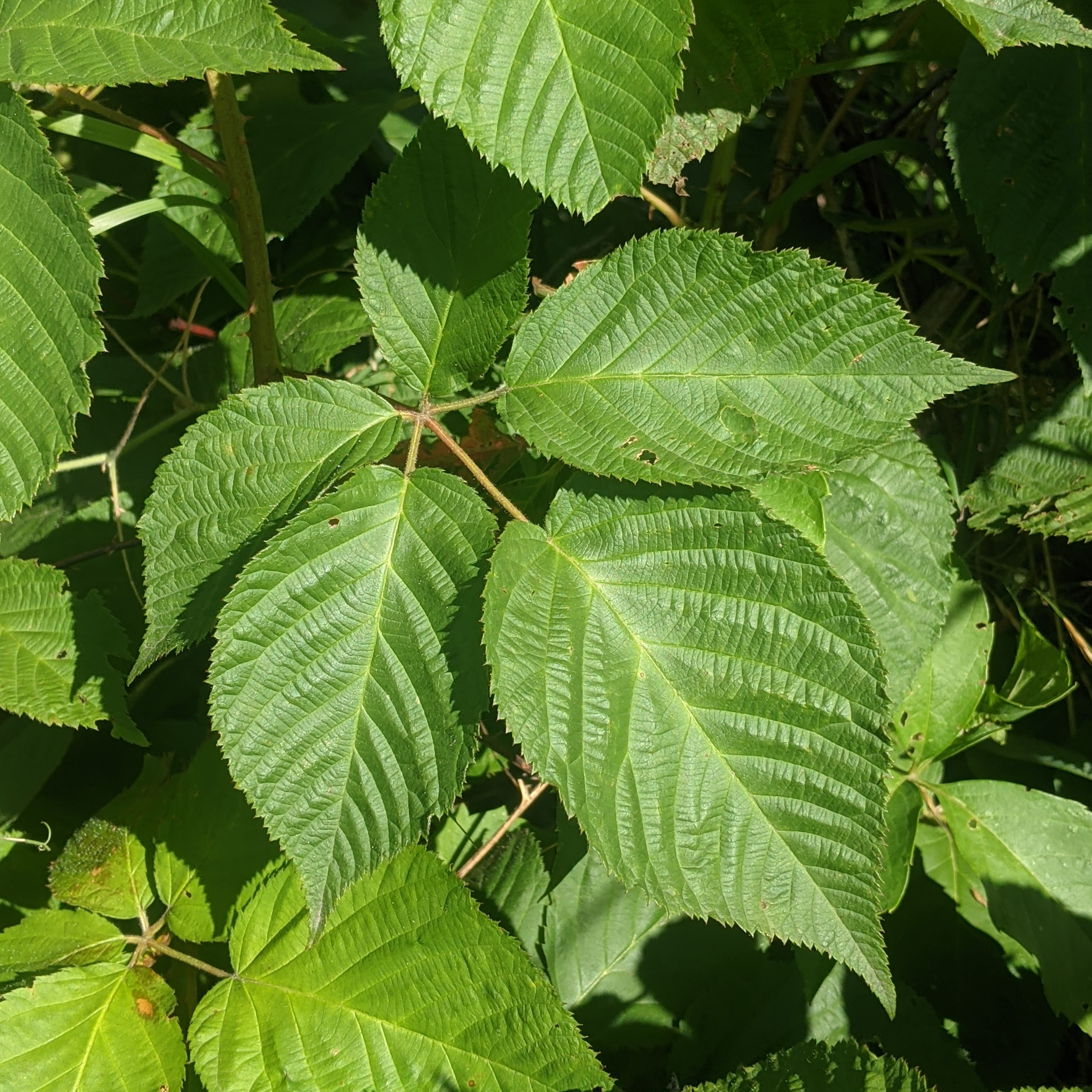
- A typical primocane leaf

Scientific classification
- Kingdom: Plantae
- Clade: Tracheophytes
- Clade: Angiosperms
- Clade: Eudicots
- Clade: Rosids
- Order: Rosales
- Family: Rosaceae
- Genus: Rubus
- Species: R. ablatus

Binomial name
- Rubus ablatus L.H.Bailey

= Rubus ablatus =

Species of plant

Rubus ablatus is a North American species of blackberry in the genus Rubus, a member of the rose family. It is native to the north-central United States from Minnesota south to Missouri and east to Ohio.
