= Rubus exsularis =

Scientific classification
- Kingdom: Plantae
- Clade: Tracheophytes
- Clade: Angiosperms
- Clade: Eudicots
- Clade: Rosids
- Order: Rosales
- Family: Rosaceae
- Genus: Rubus
- Species: R. exsularis

Binomial name
- Rubus exsularis L.H.Bailey 1943

Berry and plant

Rubus exsularis, the fenceline dewberry, is a rare North American species of flowering plant in the rose family. It has been found in the northeastern and north-central United States, primarily in the Appalachian Mountains from New York to Kentucky, with a few isolated populations in southeastern Wisconsin.

The genetics of Rubus is extremely complex, so that it is difficult to decide on which groups should be recognized as species. There are many rare species with limited ranges such as this. Further study is suggested to clarify the taxonomy.
