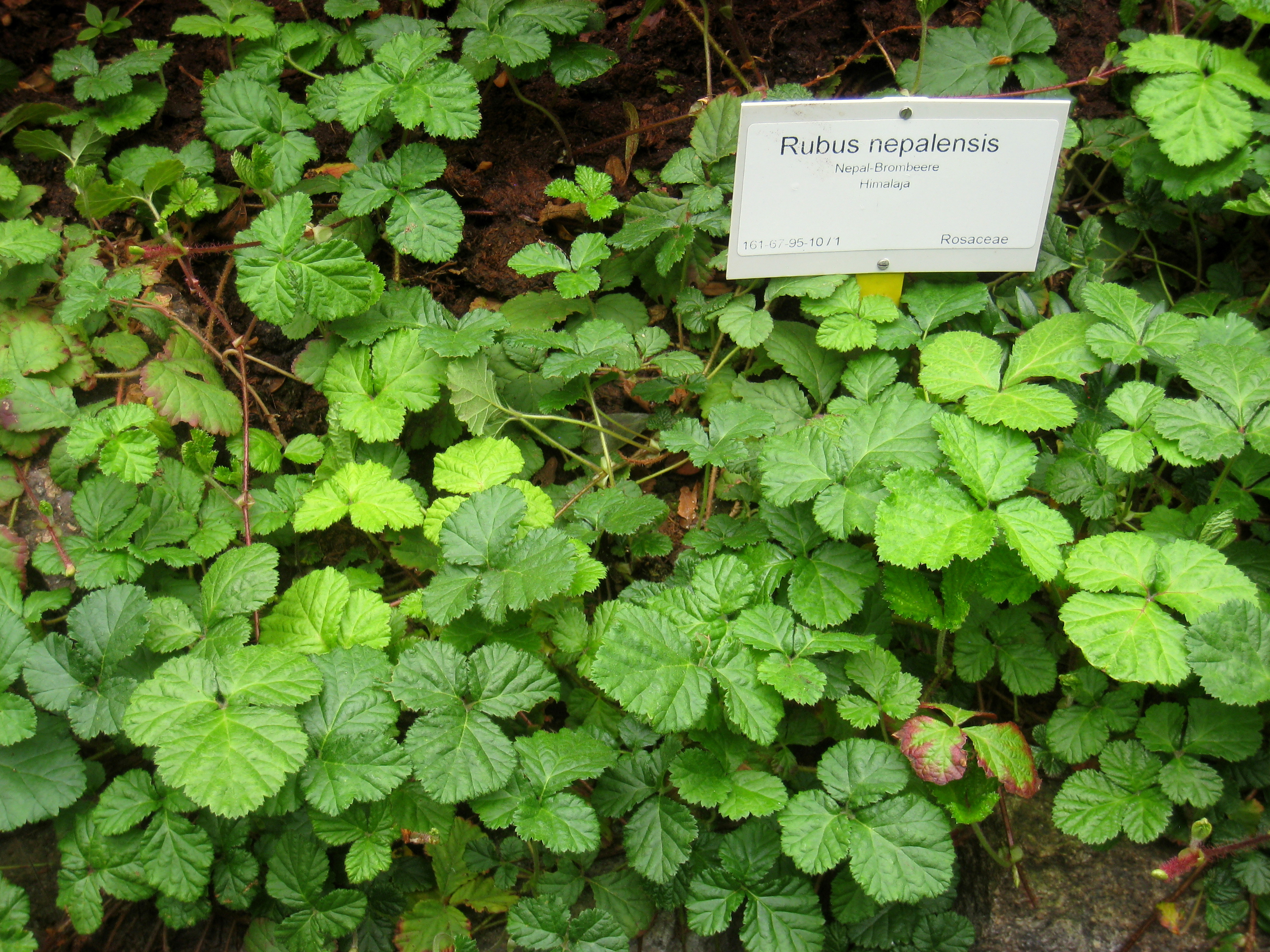

Scientific classification
- Kingdom: Plantae
- Clade: Embryophytes
- Clade: Tracheophytes
- Clade: Spermatophytes
- Clade: Angiosperms
- Clade: Eudicots
- Clade: Rosids
- Order: Rosales
- Family: Rosaceae
- Genus: Rubus
- Species: R. nepalensis

Binomial name
- Rubus nepalensis (Hook. f.) Kuntze

Synonyms
- Rubus barbatus Edgew.; Rubus nutans non Vest.; Rubus nutantiflorus Hara.

= Rubus nepalensis =

Species of flowering plant

Rubus nepalensis, the Himalayan creeping bramble or Nepalese raspberry, is a species of evergreen raspberry in the rose family. It is endemic to Nepal and Himalayan India.

== Description ==
It is an evergreen shrub with many stems, and it is known for growing widely and covering a lot of ground. It spreads wherever it grows and takes over the area in which it is located. It grows to an average of 25 centimetres (10 inches) tall, with a spread of about 0.9 metres (3 feet).

The flowers are hermaphrodite, meaning it has both female and male flowers.

== Distribution and habitat ==
Rubus nepalensis is a plant which is native to Nepal and Himalayan India. It has a hardiness zone of about 8a, which means that it can grow in, and withstand, an area with a minimum temperature of −12.2 °C to −9.4 °C. This plant can be grown almost anywhere in Nepal, as it will grow in a variety of soils, including those which contain clay or sand. It prefers drained soil. This is an ideal plant for farmers to cultivate in Nepal, as the topography there is mountainous. If the berry was planted on the mountainsides, any excess water would naturally drain downward. This plant can either grow in little to no shade. It does not need a lot of care to grow well and produce a great output; it can do so with little intervention.

The plant requires a neutral pH level. The plant is not drought tolerant, thus requiring a constant supply of water, but not oversaturation. Although this plant can grow with no shade, it does not do well when it is too hot, or if there is direct sunlight for extended periods of time. This plant is also known to be attacked by honey fungus, which takes over the plant and eventually kills it.

== Ecology ==
This plant is very environmentally sustainable. Farmers only need to purchase seeds for the initial planting. Seeds can then be harvested from the plant the next year, and planted. So there is only a start-up cost, because after the initial time, the plant is sustainable. Nepal is a mountainous country, and if this plant is grown on the mountains, it is vital to ensure that erosion does not occur. This plant itself would only minimally contribute to erosion as taking nutrients out of the soil exacerbates erosion, but the farming practices such as cutting down trees to clear land would contribute to soil erosion. A study found that using simple, inexpensive matter such as mulch, manure, and cover crop on the soil would help prevent erosion, and this manure could also be used as a natural fertilizer for the plant. This plant would also not require much, if any, pesticides or herbicides, as it is only really susceptible to honey fungus, as previously mentioned. The cultivation of this plant does not require ploughing or any work done by animals, which is expensive. The initial seeding is done by simply placing the seed in a hole, and after that it requires only occasional weeding and watering. For all these reasons, this plant is very cost efficient for poorer farmers.

The impact which this plant has on local biodiversity is very positive. It is a plant that is native to Nepal, thus native to the local ecosystem. It is preserving this ecosystem, as a foreign species is not being introduced, but something that is natural to the area is being cultivated. This plant also contributes to biodiversity as it gives nutrition to insects that pollinate it (the flowers are hermaphrodite, but require pollination through insects). Since this plant is indigenous to the country, it would not become an invasive species. Sometimes, however, it can spread and takeover a lot of ground cover. Then it must be cut back in order not to compete with other crops or plants.

== Uses ==
It is not difficult to cultivate this plant, plus it does not require much human intervention, only periodical weeding, or cutting it back, as it grows naturally. It is also nutritious for children as it contains high volumes of vitamin C.

If this crop were to become an export, one of the economic benefits would be that it would help to generate a stable income for farmers and their families, which then could help them to improve their farming practices, and raise their standards of living. It would allow them to eventually expand their farming practices, if the demand required it. It would also help to develop Nepal’s system of commerce, as people would be required to grade and pack the berries, and to transport and export them. It would not be a difficult task to begin a business with this plant. As mentioned earlier, seeds are usually inexpensive, and once the first seed is planted, the subsequent plant produces seeds that can be used for more plants, at no cost. Farmers can share seeds with each other, or simply buy them from a market. Since seeds are not usually expensive, the start-up costs would be low. This plant also does not require a tremendous amount of land to grow, in contrast to a crop such as maize, for example. Thus it is relatively easy and inexpensive to cultivate, as there is no need to buy large amounts of land, or equipment such as ploughs or animals. The fruit of this plant is very versatile, as it can be used in a wide variety of products, such as smoothie additives, jams, or dried fruit.
