= Rubus satis =

Scientific classification
- Kingdom: Plantae
- Clade: Tracheophytes
- Clade: Angiosperms
- Clade: Eudicots
- Clade: Rosids
- Order: Rosales
- Family: Rosaceae
- Genus: Rubus
- Species: R. satis

Binomial name
- Rubus satis L.H.Bailey 1943

Berry and plant

Rubus satis is a North American species of dewberry in the genus Rubus, a member of the rose family. It is commonly known as downy racemose dewberry. It has a broad distribution in North America, ranging from Minnesota south to Arkansas and northeast to New York and Ontario.
