= Rubus andrewsianus =

Scientific classification
- Kingdom: Plantae
- Clade: Tracheophytes
- Clade: Angiosperms
- Clade: Eudicots
- Clade: Rosids
- Order: Rosales
- Family: Rosaceae
- Genus: Rubus
- Species: R. andrewsianus

Binomial name
- Rubus andrewsianus Blanch. 1906

Berry and plant

Rubus andrewsianus, common name Andrews' blackberry, is an uncommon North American species of flowering plant in the rose family. It is found in scattered locations in the northeastern and east-central United States (Massachusetts, Connecticut, New York, New Jersey, Pennsylvania, Maryland, West Virginia).

The genetics of Rubus is extremely complex, so that it is difficult to decide on which groups should be recognized as species. There are many rare species with limited ranges such as this. Further study is suggested to clarify the taxonomy.
