= Rubus trichomallus =

Scientific classification
- Kingdom: Plantae
- Clade: Tracheophytes
- Clade: Angiosperms
- Clade: Eudicots
- Clade: Rosids
- Order: Rosales
- Family: Rosaceae
- Genus: Rubus
- Species: R. trichomallus

Binomial name
- Rubus trichomallus Schltdl.

Species of fruit and plant

Rubus trichomallus is a Latin American species of brambles in the rose family. It grows in southern Mexico, Colombia, and Central America.

Rubus trichomallus is a shrub several meters tall, with curved prickles and copious hairs. Leaves are compound with 3 or 5 leaflets. Fruits are red at first, nearly black when fully ripe.
