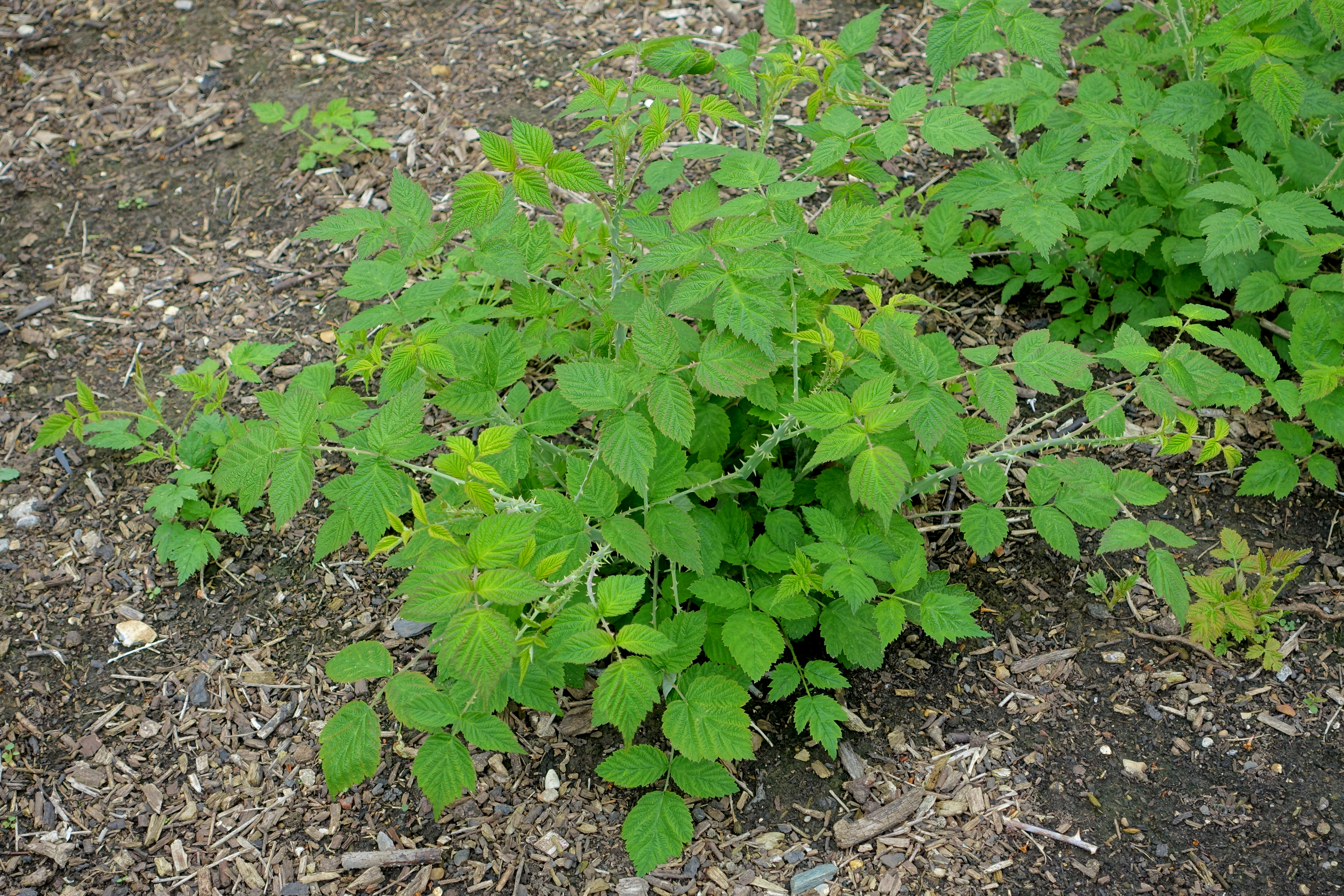

Scientific classification
- Kingdom: Plantae
- Clade: Embryophytes
- Clade: Tracheophytes
- Clade: Spermatophytes
- Clade: Angiosperms
- Clade: Eudicots
- Clade: Rosids
- Order: Rosales
- Family: Rosaceae
- Genus: Rubus
- Species: R. biflorus

Binomial name
- Rubus biflorus Buch.-Ham. ex Sm.

= Rubus biflorus =

Species of fruit and plant

Rubus biflorus is a flowering plant in the genus Rubus (including raspberries and blackberries), in the family Rosaceae.

It is a deciduous, suckering shrub, growing 3 to 3.5 metres (10 to 11 1/2 ft). The underside of the pinnate leaves has a white bloom. The flowers are white, sometimes followed by edible yellow fruits.

The plant is native to East Asia. It is grown ornamentally for its arching white thorny stems in winter. It has gained the Royal Horticultural Society's Award of Garden Merit.
