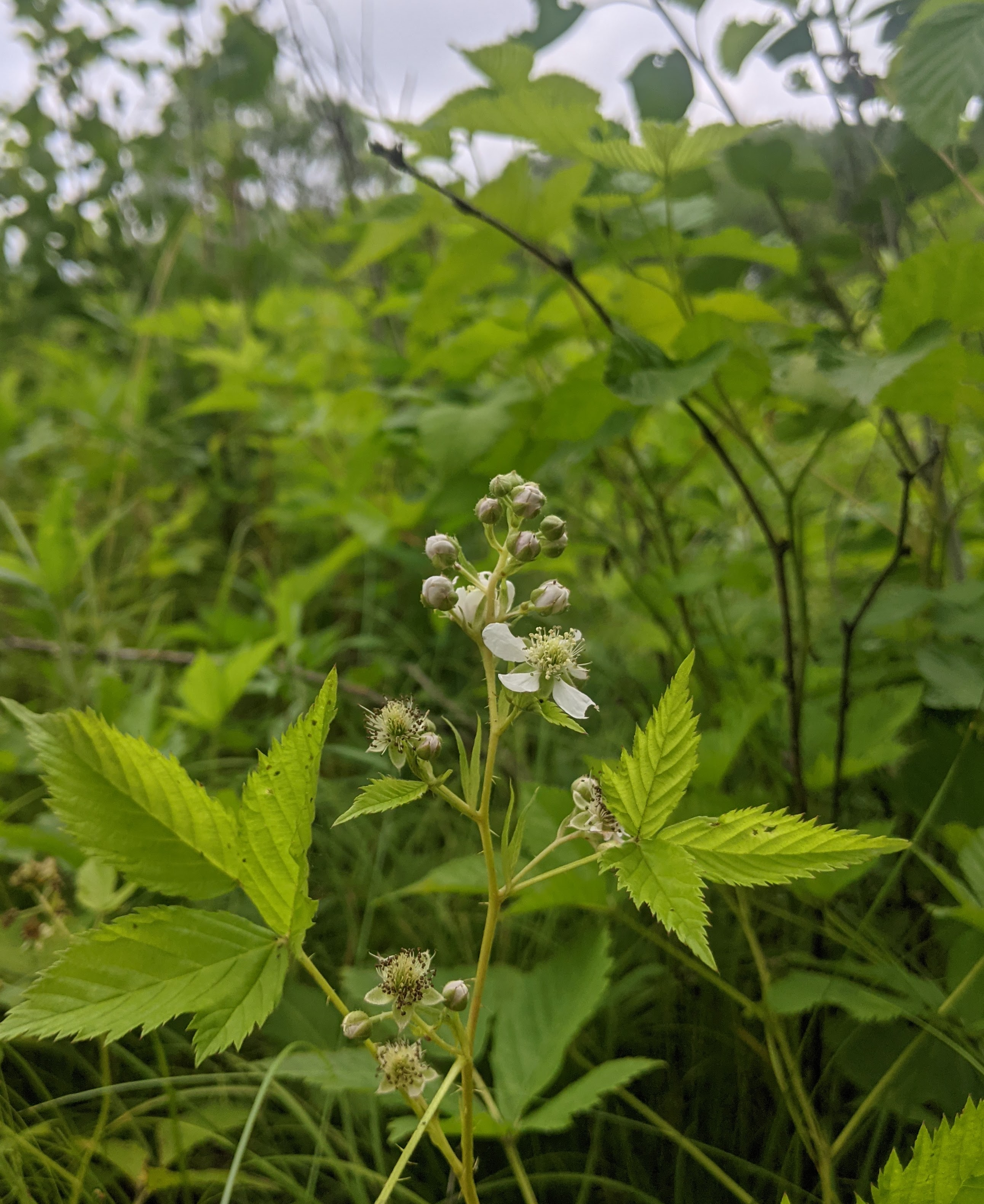

Scientific classification
- Kingdom: Plantae
- Clade: Tracheophytes
- Clade: Angiosperms
- Clade: Eudicots
- Clade: Rosids
- Order: Rosales
- Family: Rosaceae
- Genus: Rubus
- Species: R. stipulatus

Binomial name
- Rubus stipulatus L.H.Bailey

Synonyms
- Rubus dissensus L.H.Bailey

= Rubus stipulatus =

Species of fruit and plant

Rubus stipulatus is a North American species of bristleberry in the genus Rubus, a member of the rose family. It is native to the Great Lakes region in the north-central United States (Minnesota, Wisconsin, Michigan, Iowa) and Ontario, Canada.
