= Rubus steelei =

Scientific classification
- Kingdom: Plantae
- Clade: Tracheophytes
- Clade: Angiosperms
- Clade: Eudicots
- Clade: Rosids
- Order: Rosales
- Family: Rosaceae
- Genus: Rubus
- Species: R. steelei

Binomial name
- Rubus steelei L.H.Bailey

Synonyms
- Rubus currulis L.H.Bailey

Species of fruit and plant

Rubus steelei is a North American species of dewberry in the genus Rubus, a member of the rose family. It grows in the Upper Mississippi Valley, the Great Lakes region and the Appalachian Mountains, with isolated populations scattered in Texas, Georgia, and Alabama.
