= Rubus leviculus =

Scientific classification
- Kingdom: Plantae
- Clade: Tracheophytes
- Clade: Angiosperms
- Clade: Eudicots
- Clade: Rosids
- Order: Rosales
- Family: Rosaceae
- Genus: Rubus
- Species: R. leviculus

Binomial name
- Rubus leviculus L.H.Bailey 1943

Species of fruit and plant

Rubus leviculus is a rare North American species of brambles in the rose family. It has been found only in scattered locations in the eastern and central United States.

The genetics of Rubus is extremely complex, so that it is difficult to decide on which groups should be recognized as species. There are many rare species with limited ranges such as this. Further study is suggested to clarify the taxonomy.
