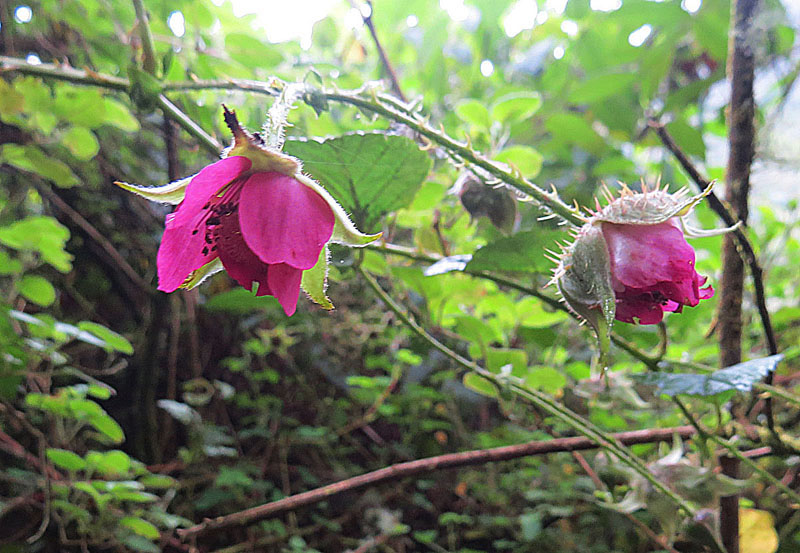

Scientific classification
- Kingdom: Plantae
- Clade: Embryophytes
- Clade: Tracheophytes
- Clade: Spermatophytes
- Clade: Angiosperms
- Clade: Eudicots
- Clade: Rosids
- Order: Rosales
- Family: Rosaceae
- Genus: Rubus
- Species: R. roseus

Binomial name
- Rubus roseus Poir.

= Rubus roseus =

Species of fruit and plant

Rubus roseus (mora silvestre) is a South American species of bramble.

== Description ==
R. roseus is a low-arching and cluster-forming shrub up to 2 metres (6 1/2 feet) tall.

== Distribution and habitat ==
The species is native to the high elevations of the Andes regions of South America.

== Uses ==
The fruits are edible and commonly used in drinks and dyes.
