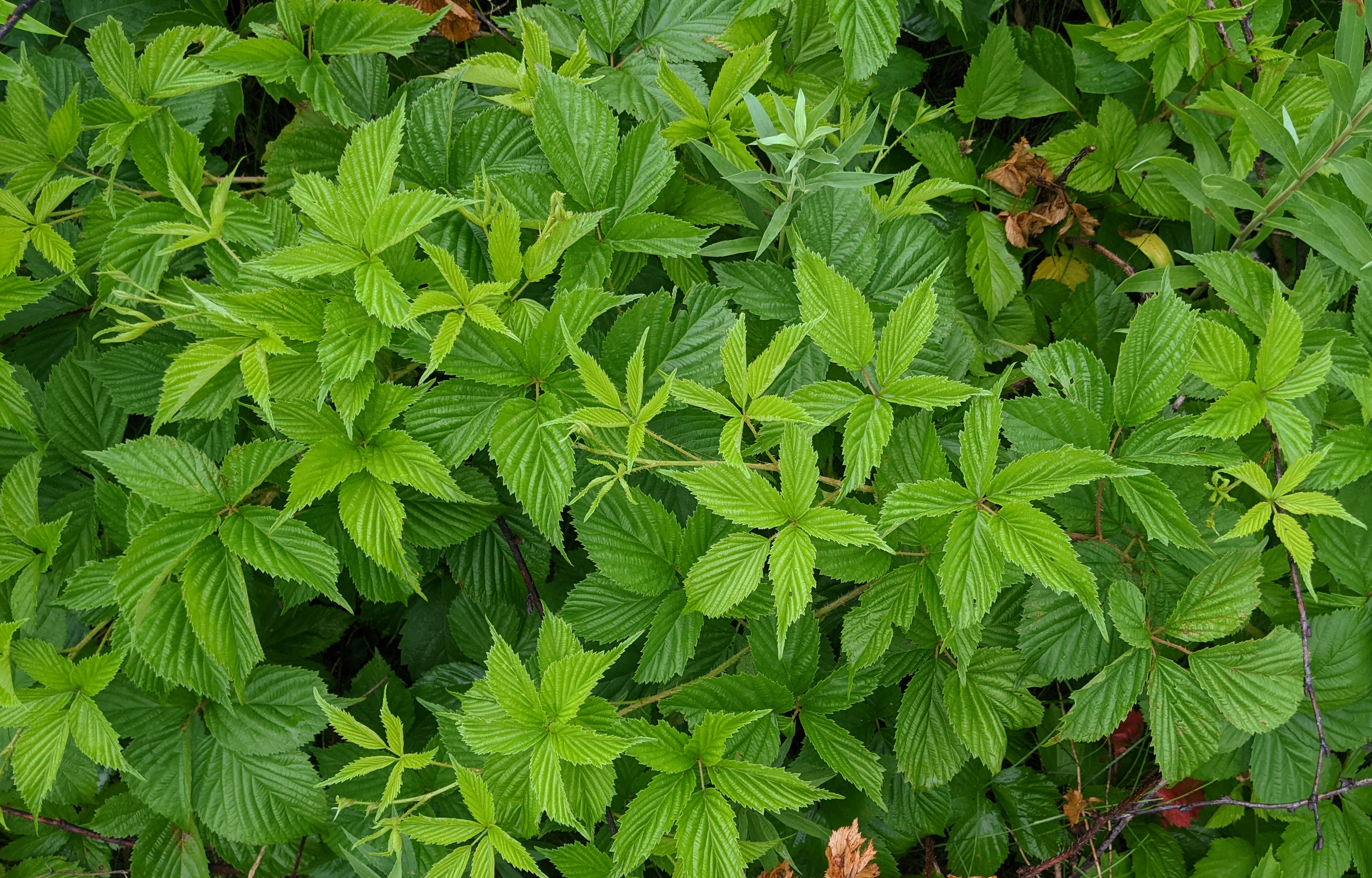
- Primocane leaves

Scientific classification
- Kingdom: Plantae
- Clade: Tracheophytes
- Clade: Angiosperms
- Clade: Eudicots
- Clade: Rosids
- Order: Rosales
- Family: Rosaceae
- Genus: Rubus
- Species: R. wisconsinensis

Binomial name
- Rubus wisconsinensis L.H.Bailey 1932

Synonyms
- Rubus conabilis L.H.Bailey; Rubus latifoliolus L.H.Bailey; Rubus minnesotanus L.H.Bailey; Rubus setospinosus L.H.Bailey

= Rubus wisconsinensis =

Species of fruit and plant

Rubus wisconsinensis is a North American species of bristleberry in section Setosi of the genus Rubus, a member of the rose family. It is native to the north-central United States (Minnesota, Wisconsin, Michigan, Iowa, Illinois).
