= Rubus centralis =

Scientific classification
- Kingdom: Plantae
- Clade: Tracheophytes
- Clade: Angiosperms
- Clade: Eudicots
- Clade: Rosids
- Order: Rosales
- Family: Rosaceae
- Genus: Rubus
- Species: R. centralis

Binomial name
- Rubus centralis L.H.Bailey 1932

Berry and plant

Rubus centralis, the Illinois dewberry, is a rare North American species of flowering plant in the rose family. It has been found only in the east-central United States (Indiana, Pennsylvania, Michigan, Oklahoma, Pennsylvania).

The genetics of Rubus is extremely complex, so that it is difficult to decide on which groups should be recognized as species. There are many rare species with limited ranges such as this. Further study is suggested to clarify the taxonomy.
