= Rubus fulleri =

Scientific classification
- Kingdom: Plantae
- Clade: Tracheophytes
- Clade: Angiosperms
- Clade: Eudicots
- Clade: Rosids
- Order: Rosales
- Family: Rosaceae
- Genus: Rubus
- Species: R. fulleri

Binomial name
- Rubus fulleri L.H.Bailey 1941

Synonyms
- Rubus exter L. H. Bailey; Rubus setosus Bigelow var. rotundior L. H. Bailey

Berry and plant

Rubus fulleri is a North American species of dewberry in the genus Rubus, a member of the rose family. It is commonly known as Fuller's bristly dewberry or Fuller's groundberry. It grows in the Great Lakes region of the United States and southern Canada (Ontario).
