= Rubus florulentus =

Scientific classification
- Kingdom: Plantae
- Clade: Tracheophytes
- Clade: Angiosperms
- Clade: Eudicots
- Clade: Rosids
- Order: Rosales
- Family: Rosaceae
- Genus: Rubus
- Species: R. florulentus

Binomial name
- Rubus florulentus Focke 1890

Synonyms
- Rubus florulentus var. eggersii Focke

Species of fruit and plant

Rubus florulentus is a rare Caribbean species of flowering plant in the rose family. It has been found only in Puerto Rico.

The genetics of Rubus is extremely complex, so that it is difficult to decide on which groups should be recognized as species. There are many rare species with limited ranges such as this. Further study is suggested to clarify the taxonomy.
