= Rubus fecundus =

Scientific classification
- Kingdom: Plantae
- Clade: Tracheophytes
- Clade: Angiosperms
- Clade: Eudicots
- Clade: Rosids
- Order: Rosales
- Family: Rosaceae
- Genus: Rubus
- Species: R. fecundus

Binomial name
- Rubus fecundus L.H.Bailey 1943

Synonyms
- Rubus celer L.H.Bailey; Rubus vixalacer L.H.Bailey

Species of fruit and plant

Rubus fecundus is a North American species of dewberry in section Procumbentes (formerly Flagellares) of the genus Rubus, a member of the rose family. It has been in central Canada and in the eastern and central United States, from Québec and Ontario south as far as Missouri, Alabama and South Carolina. Nowhere is it very common, though most of the known populations can be found in the Ozarks and the Appalachians.
