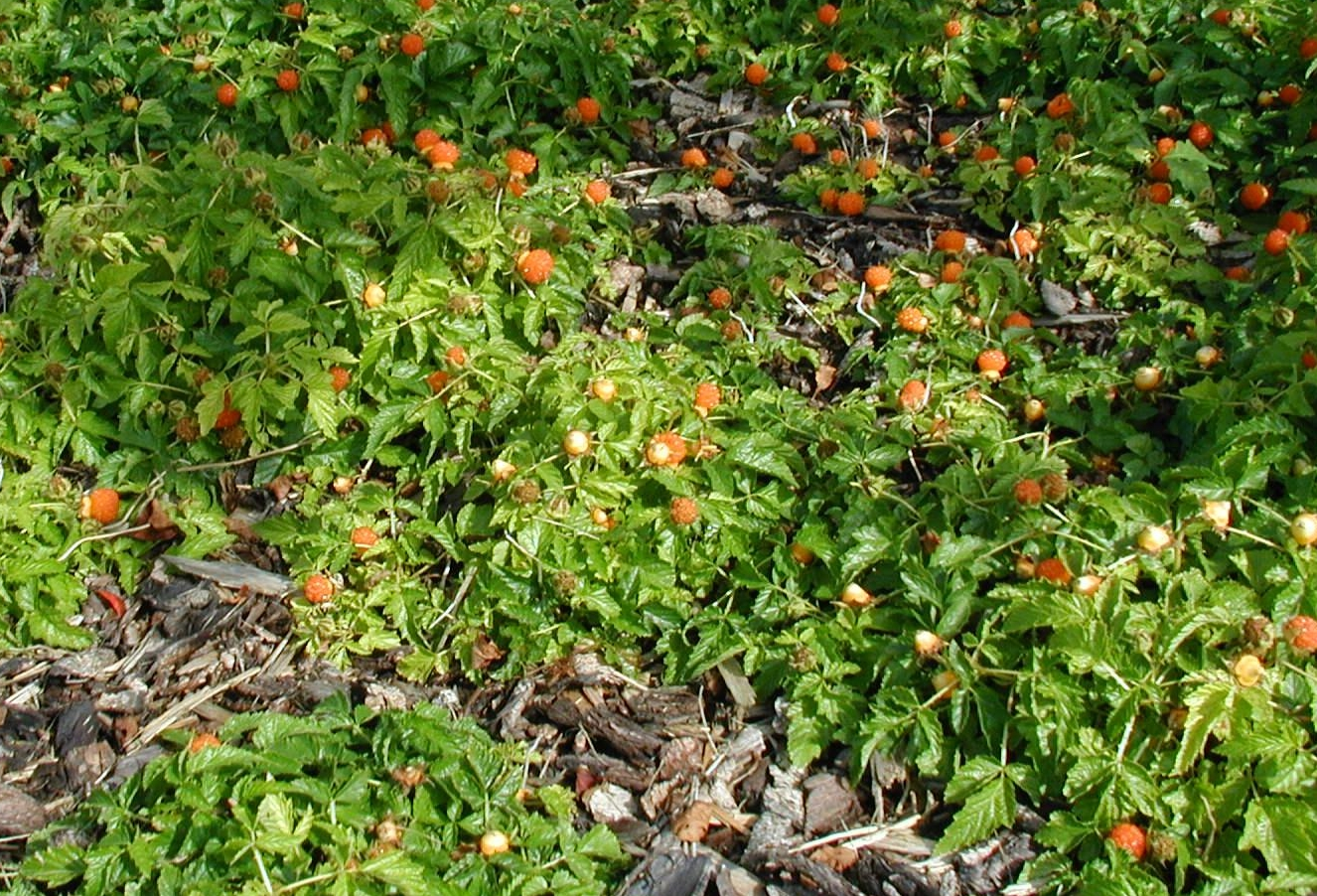
- Typical dwarf habit
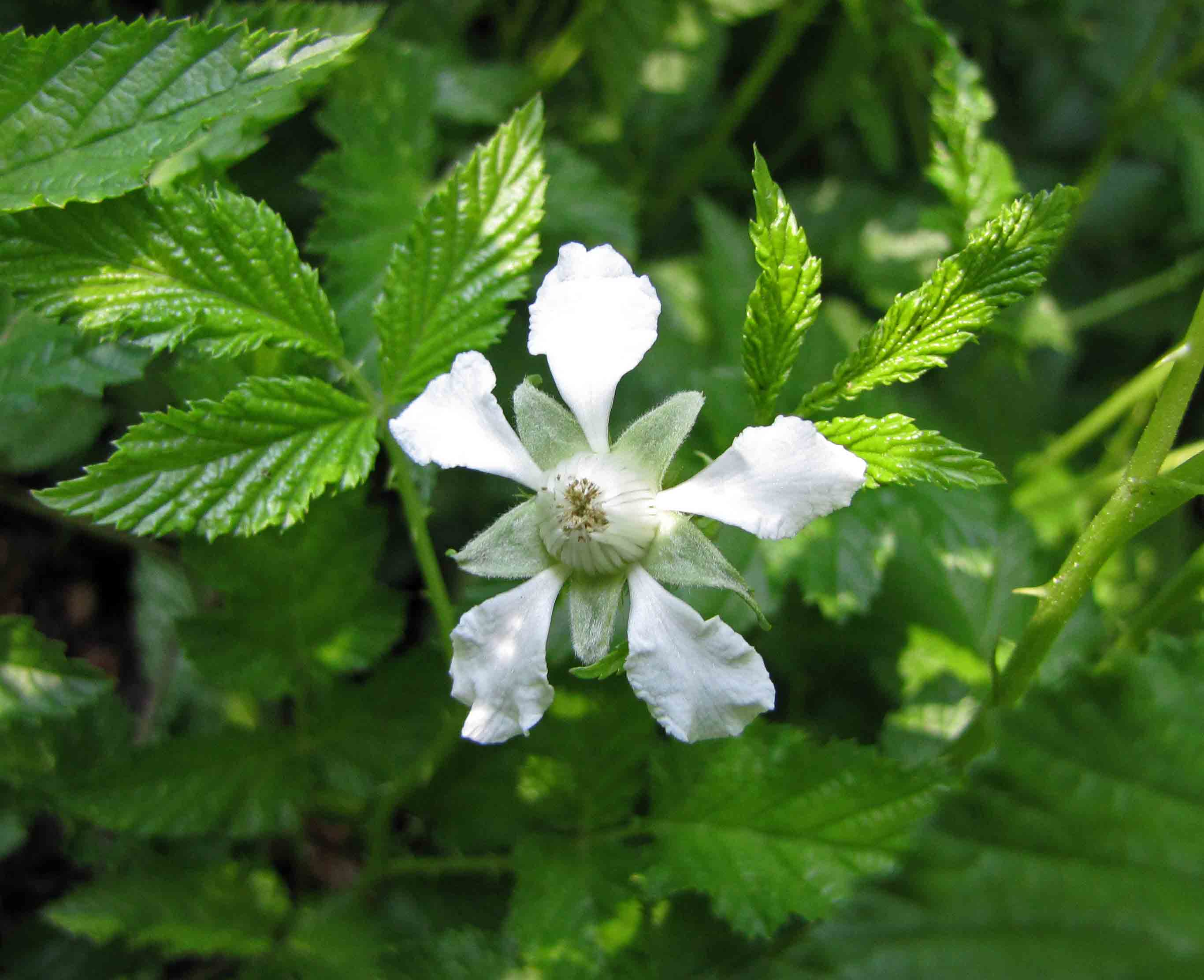
- Close-up of flower

Scientific classification
- Kingdom: Plantae
- Clade: Embryophytes
- Clade: Tracheophytes
- Clade: Spermatophytes
- Clade: Angiosperms
- Clade: Eudicots
- Clade: Rosids
- Order: Rosales
- Family: Rosaceae
- Genus: Rubus
- Species: R. xanthocarpus

Binomial name
- Rubus xanthocarpus Bureau & Franch.

Synonyms
- Rubus sitiens Focke; Rubus spinipes Hemsl.; Rubus tibetanus Focke

= Rubus xanthocarpus =

Species of plant in the rose family

Rubus xanthocarpus is an East Asian species of bramble. It is native to central and southern China, and has been naturalized in Poland and the former Czechoslovakia.

The plant is available from commercial suppliers. The orange-yellow fruit are edible, taste similar to raspberries, and can be eaten raw or made into preserves or wine.

== Etymology ==
The specific epithet xanthocarpus means "having yellow fruit".
