= Rubus riograndis =

Scientific classification
- Kingdom: Plantae
- Clade: Embryophytes
- Clade: Tracheophytes
- Clade: Angiosperms
- Clade: Eudicots
- Clade: Rosids
- Order: Rosales
- Family: Rosaceae
- Genus: Rubus
- Species: R. riograndis

Binomial name
- Rubus riograndis L.H.Bailey

Synonyms
- Rubus duplaris Shinners; Rubus trivialis var. duplaris (Shinners) Mahler

Species of fruit and plant

Rubus riograndis is a North American species of dewberry in section Verotriviales of the genus Rubus, a member of the rose family. It has been found only in Texas in the south-central United States.
