= Rubus grimesii =

Scientific classification
- Kingdom: Plantae
- Clade: Tracheophytes
- Clade: Angiosperms
- Clade: Eudicots
- Clade: Rosids
- Order: Rosales
- Family: Rosaceae
- Genus: Rubus
- Species: R. grimesii

Binomial name
- Rubus grimesii L.H.Bailey 1932

Synonyms
- Rubus cathartium Fernald

Species of fruit and plant

Rubus grimesii is a North American species of flowering plant in the rose family. It is native to the east-central United States (Delaware, Maryland, Virginia, North Carolina).

The genetics of Rubus is extremely complex, so that it is difficult to decide on which groups should be recognized as species. There are many rare species with limited ranges such as this. Further study is suggested to clarify the taxonomy.
