= Rubus curtipes =

Scientific classification
- Kingdom: Plantae
- Clade: Embryophytes
- Clade: Tracheophytes
- Clade: Spermatophytes
- Clade: Angiosperms
- Clade: Eudicots
- Clade: Rosids
- Order: Rosales
- Family: Rosaceae
- Genus: Rubus
- Species: R. curtipes

Binomial name
- Rubus curtipes L.H.Bailey 1943

Species of plant

Rubus curtipes, or shortstalk dewberry, is a North American species of dewberry of the genus Rubus, and a member of the rose family. It is native to the northeastern and north-central United States from Massachusetts west to Iowa and south to Tennessee. It is a low-growing perennial shrub notable for its short fruit stalks and white spring flowers.

== Description ==
The species was first described by Liberty Hyde Bailey in 1943. Some taxonomists have considered Rubus curtipes to be closely related to, or even a variety of, Rubus flagellaris due to morphological similarities. Although considered uncommon and with a scattered distribution, Rubus curtipes is not currently listed as threatened.

The white flowers of Rubus curtipes bloom from March to June and are arranged in small corymbs. Following flowering, the plant produces edible fruit composed of aggregates of drupelets, similar in appearance to small blackberries or dewberries. These fruits are consumed by various species of birds and mammals, and the flowers attract bees and other pollinators.

== Distribution ==
Rubus curtipes is native to the northeastern and north-central regions of the United States, with its range extending from Massachusetts west to Iowa and south to Tennessee, Virginia, southern Missouri, and Wisconsin. It is typically found in thickets, woodland edges, and open fields, often preferring well-drained soils.
