= Rubus mollior =

Scientific classification
- Kingdom: Plantae
- Clade: Tracheophytes
- Clade: Angiosperms
- Clade: Eudicots
- Clade: Rosids
- Order: Rosales
- Family: Rosaceae
- Genus: Rubus
- Species: R. mollior

Binomial name
- Rubus mollior L.H.Bailey 1945 not Gand. 1884

Species of fruit and plant

Rubus mollior is an uncommon North American species of brambles in the rose family. It grows in the central United States (Missouri, Oklahoma, Arkansas, Kansas).

The genetics of Rubus is extremely complex, so it is difficult to decide on which groups should be recognized as species. There are many rare species with limited ranges such as this. Further study is suggested to clarify the taxonomy.
