= Rubus vulgaris =

Scientific classification
- Kingdom: Plantae
- Clade: Tracheophytes
- Clade: Angiosperms
- Clade: Eudicots
- Clade: Rosids
- Order: Rosales
- Family: Rosaceae
- Genus: Rubus
- Species: R. vulgaris

Binomial name
- Rubus vulgaris Weihe & Nees 1824

Synonyms
- Synonymy: Rubus communis Bayer; Rubus commutatus G.Braun; Rubus fruticosus L. ex Dierb; Rubus fruticosu] var. vulgaris (Weihe & Nees) Bréb.; Rubus nitidus T.B.Salter; Rubus pilosus var. vulgaris (Weihe & Nees) Dumort.; Rubus pubescens var. vulgaris (Weihe & Nees) Karsch; Rubus sanctus var. vulgaris (Weihe & Nees) Kuntze; Rubus villicaulis var. minor Walpert; Rubus villicaulis subsp. vulgaris (Weihe & Nees) Čelak.; Rubus vulgaris var. elatior G.Braun ex Utsch; Rubus vulgaris var. micranthus G.Braun ex Utsch; Rubus vulgaris var. viridis Weihe & Nees; Rubus vulgaris subsp. viridis (Weihe & Nees) Focke

Species of shrub

Rubus vulgaris is a European species of flowering plant in the rose family.

Rubus vulgaris is a prickly shrub with tapering prickles curved downwards towards the base of the stem. Leaves are palmately compound with 5 leaflets. Flowers are pale lavender. Fruits are black. The species is sometimes considered to be a synonym of R. commutatus.
