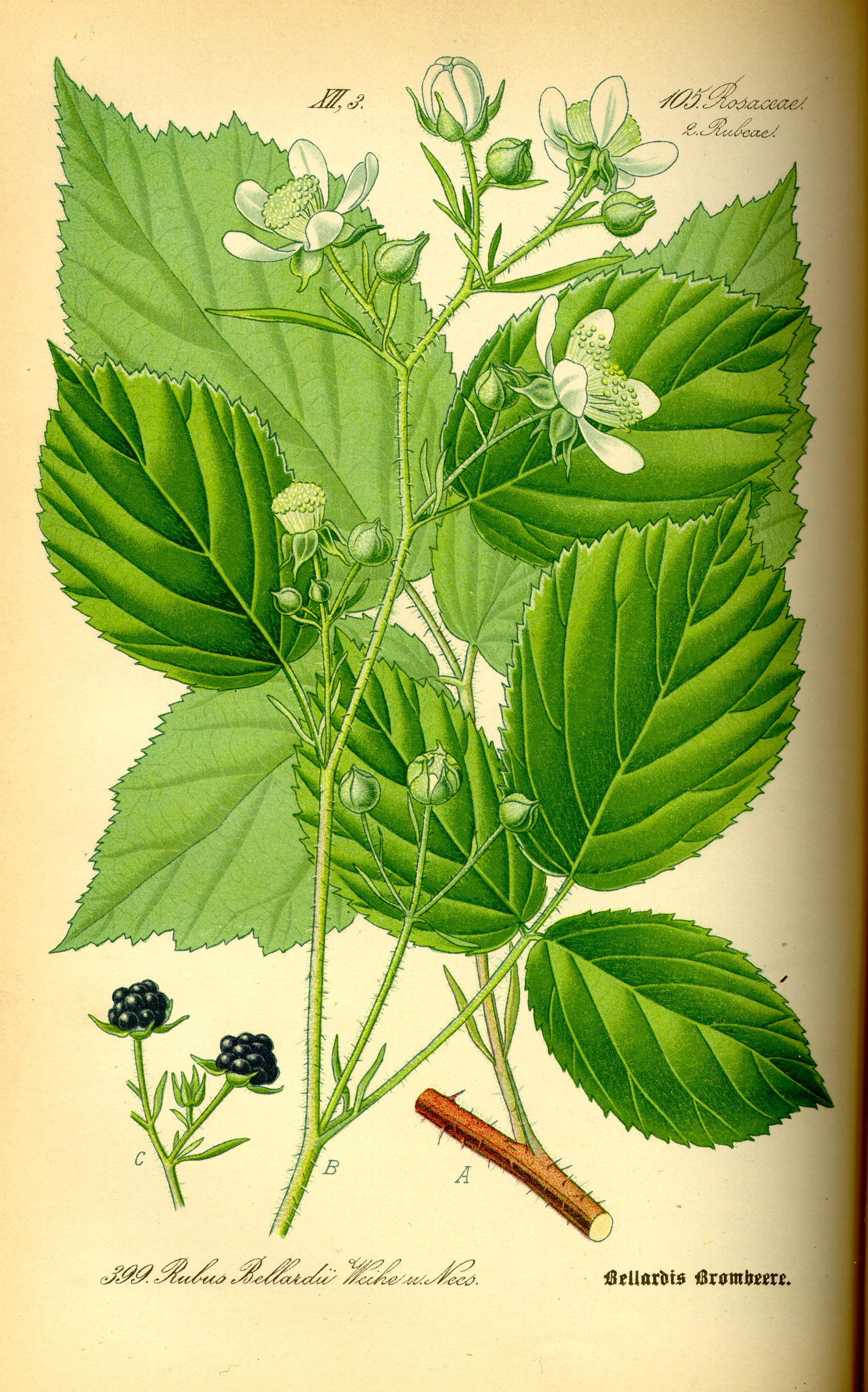

Scientific classification
- Kingdom: Plantae
- Clade: Embryophytes
- Clade: Tracheophytes
- Clade: Angiosperms
- Clade: Eudicots
- Clade: Rosids
- Order: Rosales
- Family: Rosaceae
- Genus: Rubus
- Species: R. nigricans

Binomial name
- Rubus nigricans Danthoine

Synonyms
- List: Rubus bellardii Weihe (1825); Rubus pedemontanus Pinkw. (1898)

= Rubus nigricans =

Species of fruit and plant

Rubus nigricans is a European species of bramble. The junior synonyms R. pedemontanus and R. bellardii have been more widely used in the published literature.

== Description ==
The plant forms a low arching shrub.
