= Rubus ferrofluvius =

Scientific classification
- Kingdom: Plantae
- Clade: Tracheophytes
- Clade: Angiosperms
- Clade: Eudicots
- Clade: Rosids
- Order: Rosales
- Family: Rosaceae
- Genus: Rubus
- Species: R. ferrofluvius

Binomial name
- Rubus ferrofluvius H.A.Davis, A.M.Fuller, & T.Davis 1990

Species of blackberry endemic to North America

Rubus ferrofluvius is a North American species of dewberry in the genus Rubus, a member of the rose family. It is found in Minnesota and Wisconsin.
