= Rubus oklahomus =

Scientific classification
- Kingdom: Plantae
- Clade: Tracheophytes
- Clade: Angiosperms
- Clade: Eudicots
- Clade: Rosids
- Order: Rosales
- Family: Rosaceae
- Genus: Rubus
- Species: R. oklahomus

Binomial name
- Rubus oklahomus L.H.Bailey 1932

Synonyms
- Rubus summotus L.H.Bailey

Species of fruit and plant

Rubus oklahomus is a North American species of flowering plants in the rose family. It has been found in Texas, and Oklahoma) in the south-central United States.

The genetics of Rubus is extremely complex, so that it is difficult to decide on which groups should be recognized as species. There are many rare species with limited ranges such as this. Further study is suggested to clarify the taxonomy.
