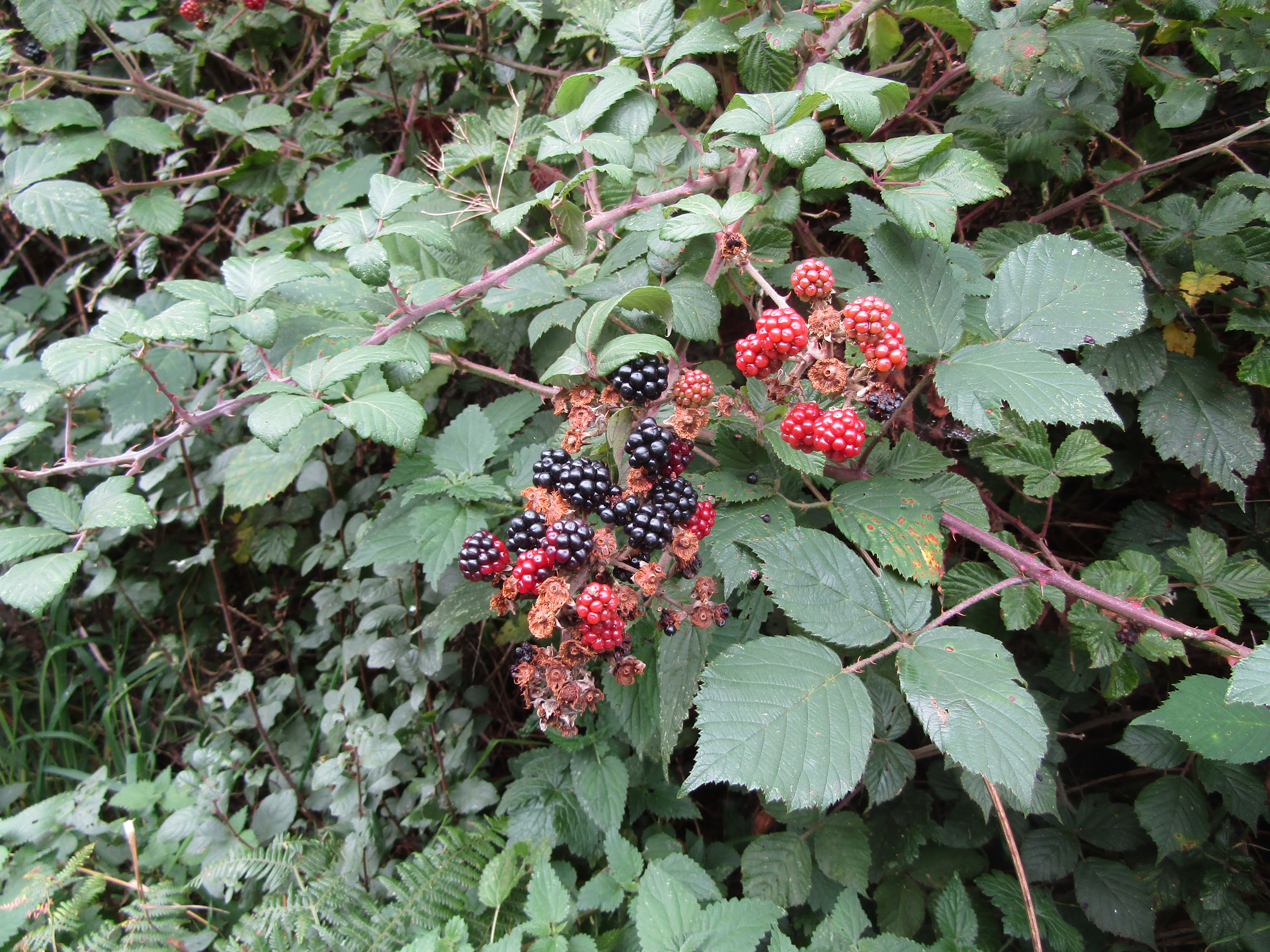
- Blackberry bush with ripe and unripe fruit

Scientific classification
- Kingdom: Plantae
- Clade: Tracheophytes
- Clade: Angiosperms
- Clade: Eudicots
- Clade: Rosids
- Order: Rosales
- Family: Rosaceae
- Subfamily: Rosoideae
- Tribe: Rubeae
- Genus: Rubus; L.

Type species
- Rubus fruticosus L.

Synonyms
- List: Ametron Raf.; Ampomele Raf.; Batidaea (Dumort.) Greene; Bossekia Neck. ex Greene; Calyctenium Greene; Cardiobatus Greene; Chamaemorus Hill; Comarobatia Greene; Cumbata Raf.; Cylactis Raf.; Dalibarda Kalm; Dyctisperma Raf.; Idaeobatus (Focke) Börner; Manteia Raf.; Melanobatus Greene; Oligacis Raf.; Oreobatus Rydb.; Parmena Greene; Psychrobatia Greene; Rubacer Rydb.; Selnorition Raf.

= Rubus =

Rubus Temporal range: Eocene–recent

Genus of plants in the rose family

Rubus is a large and diverse genus of flowering plants in the rose family, Rosaceae, subfamily Rosoideae, most commonly known as brambles. Fruits of various species are known as raspberries, blackberries, dewberries, cloudberries, and bristleberries. It is a diverse genus, and estimates of the number of Rubus species vary from 250 to over 1,000, found across all continents except Antarctica.

Most of these plants have woody stems with prickles like roses; spines, bristles, and gland-tipped hairs are also common in the genus. The Rubus fruit, sometimes called a bramble fruit, is an aggregate of drupelets. The term "cane fruit" or "cane berry" applies to any Rubus species or hybrid, which is commonly grown with supports such as wires or canes, including raspberries, blackberries, and hybrids such as loganberry, boysenberry, marionberry, and tayberry. The stems of such plants are also referred to as canes.

== Description ==
Bramble bushes typically grow as shrubs (though a few are herbaceous), with their stems being typically covered in sharp prickles. They grow long, arching shoots that readily root upon contact with soil, and form a soil rootstock from which new shoots grow in the spring. The leaves are either evergreen or deciduous, and simple, lobed, or compound. The shoots typically do not flower or set fruit until the second year of growth (i.e. they are biennial). The rootstock is perennial. Most species are hermaphrodites, with male and female parts being present on the same flower. Bramble fruits are aggregate fruits formed from smaller units called drupelets.

Around 60–70% of species of Rubus are polyploid (having more than two copies of each chromosome), with species ranging in ploidy from diploid (2×, with 14 chromosomes) to tetradecaploid (14×).

== Taxonomy ==
=== Modern classification ===
Rubus is the only genus in the tribe Rubeae.

Rubus is very complex, particularly within the blackberry/dewberry subgenus (Rubus), with polyploidy, hybridization, and facultative apomixis apparently all frequently occurring, making species classification of the great variation in the subgenus one of the grand challenges of systematic botany. In publications between 1910 and 1914, German botanist Wilhelm Olbers Focke attempted to organize the genus into 12 subgenera, a classification system that since became widely accepted, though modern genetic studies have found that many of these subgenera are not monophyletic.

Some treatments have recognized dozens of species each for what other, comparably qualified botanists have considered single, more variable species. On the other hand, species in the other Rubus subgenera (such as the raspberries) are generally distinct or else involved in more routine one-or-a-few taxonomic debates, such as whether the European and American red raspberries are better treated as one species or two (in this case, the two-species view is followed here, with R. idaeus and R. strigosus both recognized; if these species are combined, then the older name R. idaeus has priority for the broader species).

The classification presented below recognizes 13 subgenera within Rubus, with the largest subgenus (Rubus) in turn divided into 12 sections. Representative examples are presented, but many more species are not mentioned here. A comprehensive 2019 study found subgenera Orobatus and Anoplobatus to be monophyletic, while all other subgenera to be paraphyletic or polyphyletic. Molecular data have backed up classifications based on geography and chromosome number, but following morphological data, such as the structure of the leaves and stems, do not appear to produce a phylogenetic classification.

=== Fossil record ===
The genus has a likely North American origin, with fossils known from the Eocene-aged Florissant Formation of Colorado, around 34 million years old. Rubus expanded into Eurasia, South America, and Oceania during the Miocene. Fossil seeds from the early Miocene of Rubus have been found in the Czech part of the Zittau Basin. Many fossil fruits of †Rubus laticostatus, †Rubus microspermus and †Rubus semirotundatus have been extracted from bore hole samples of the Middle Miocene freshwater deposits in Nowy Sacz Basin, West Carpathians, Poland.

=== Species ===
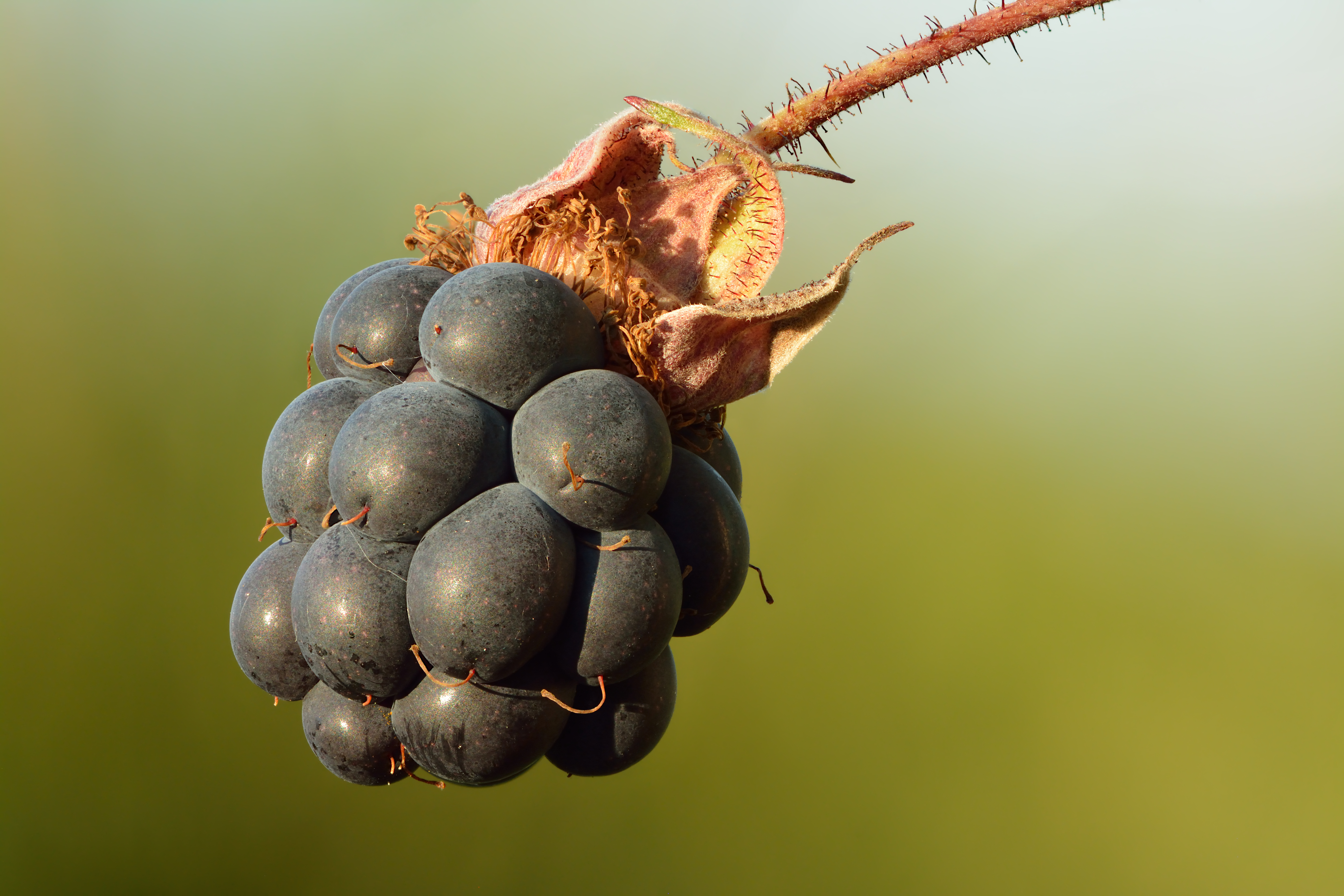
Rubus caesius berry

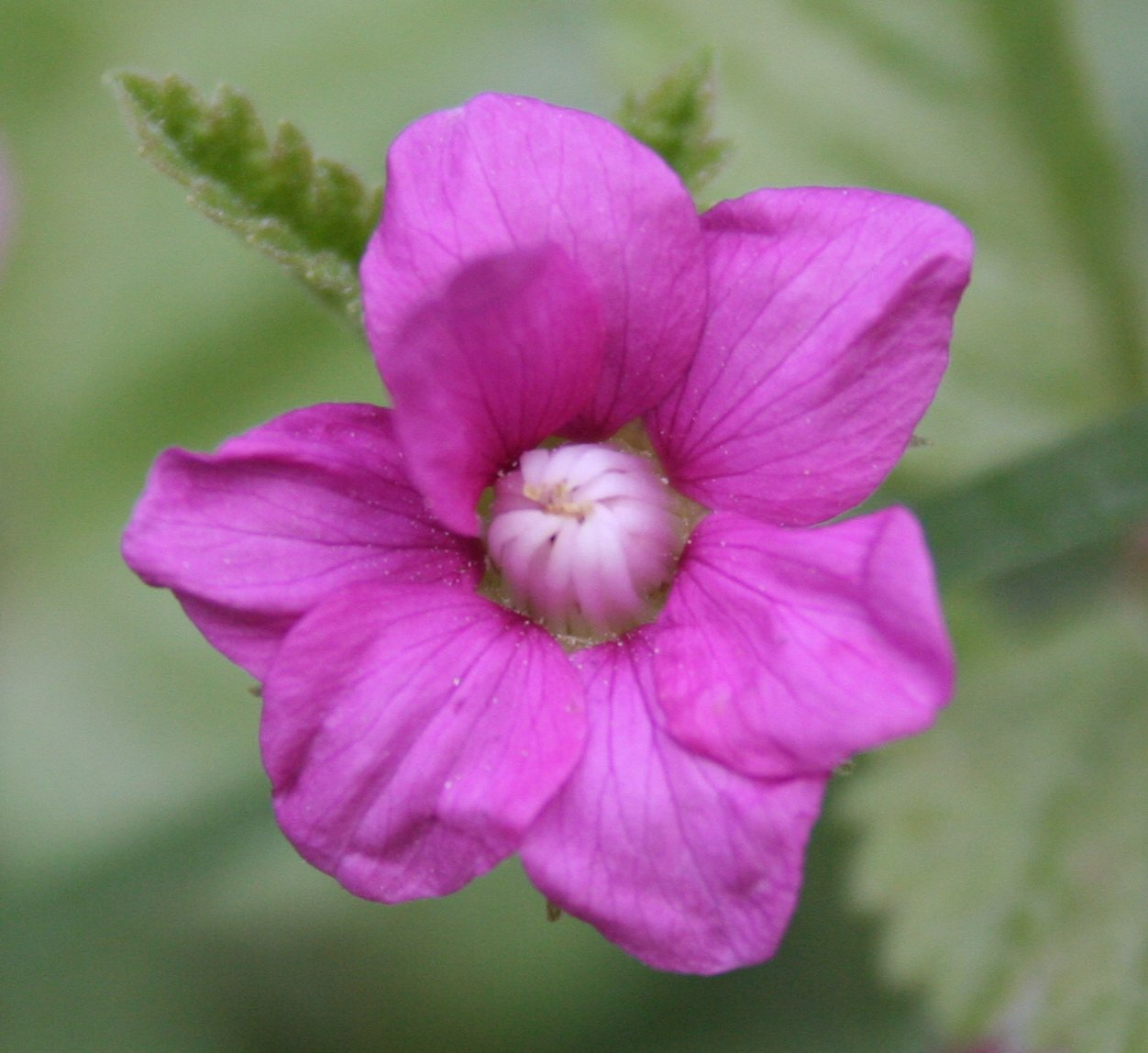
R. arcticus flower

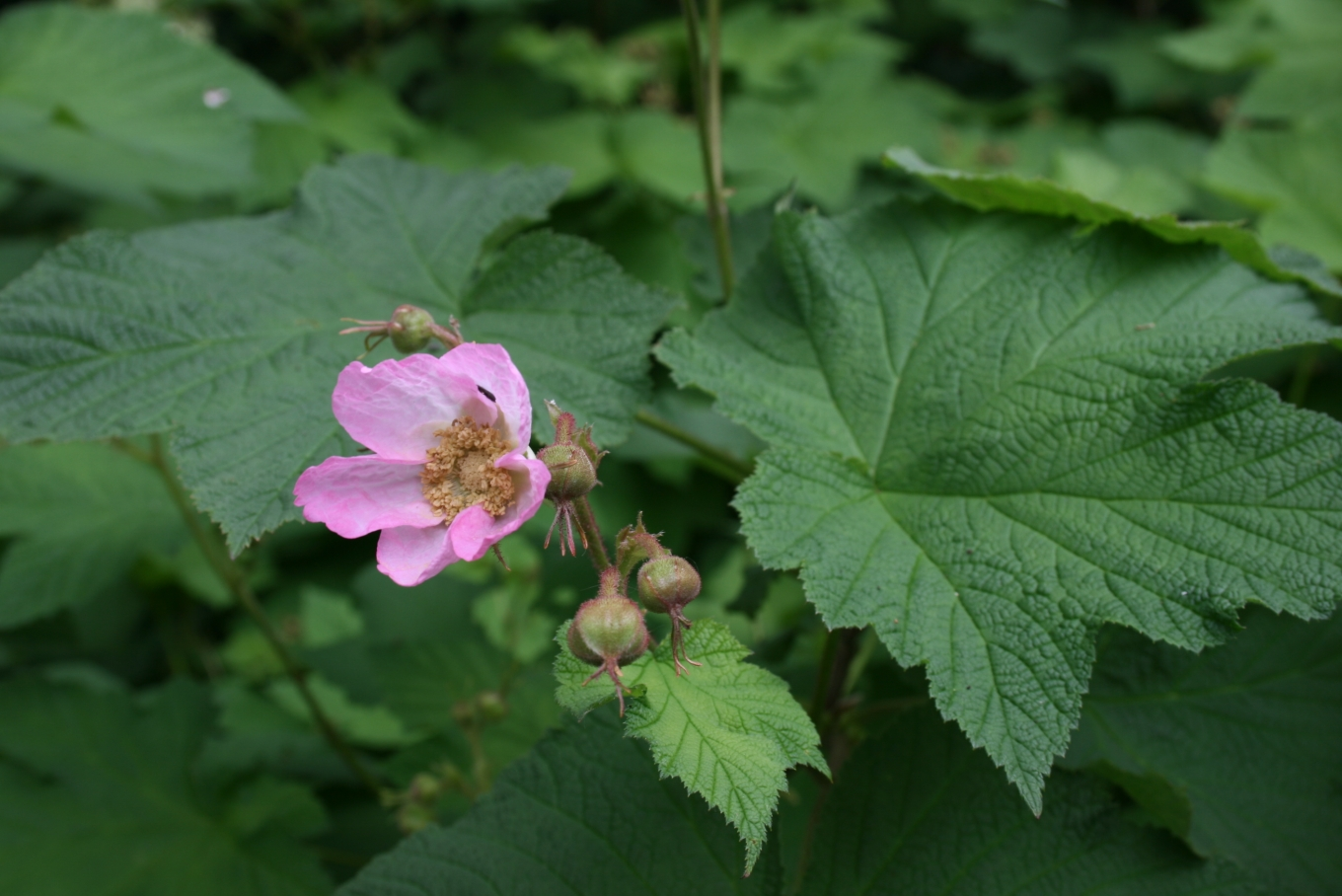
R. odoratus leaves and flower

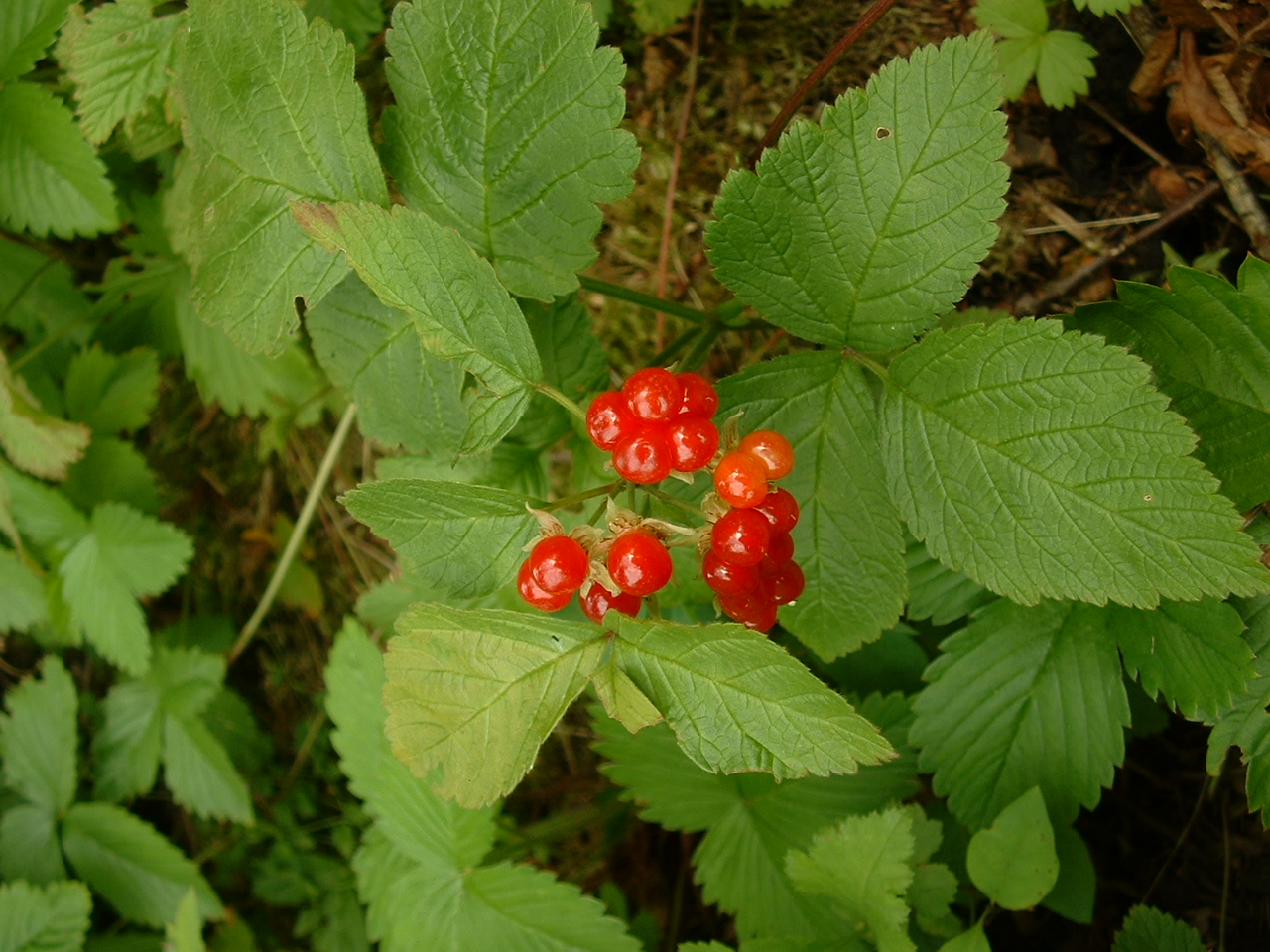
R. saxatilis leaves and berries

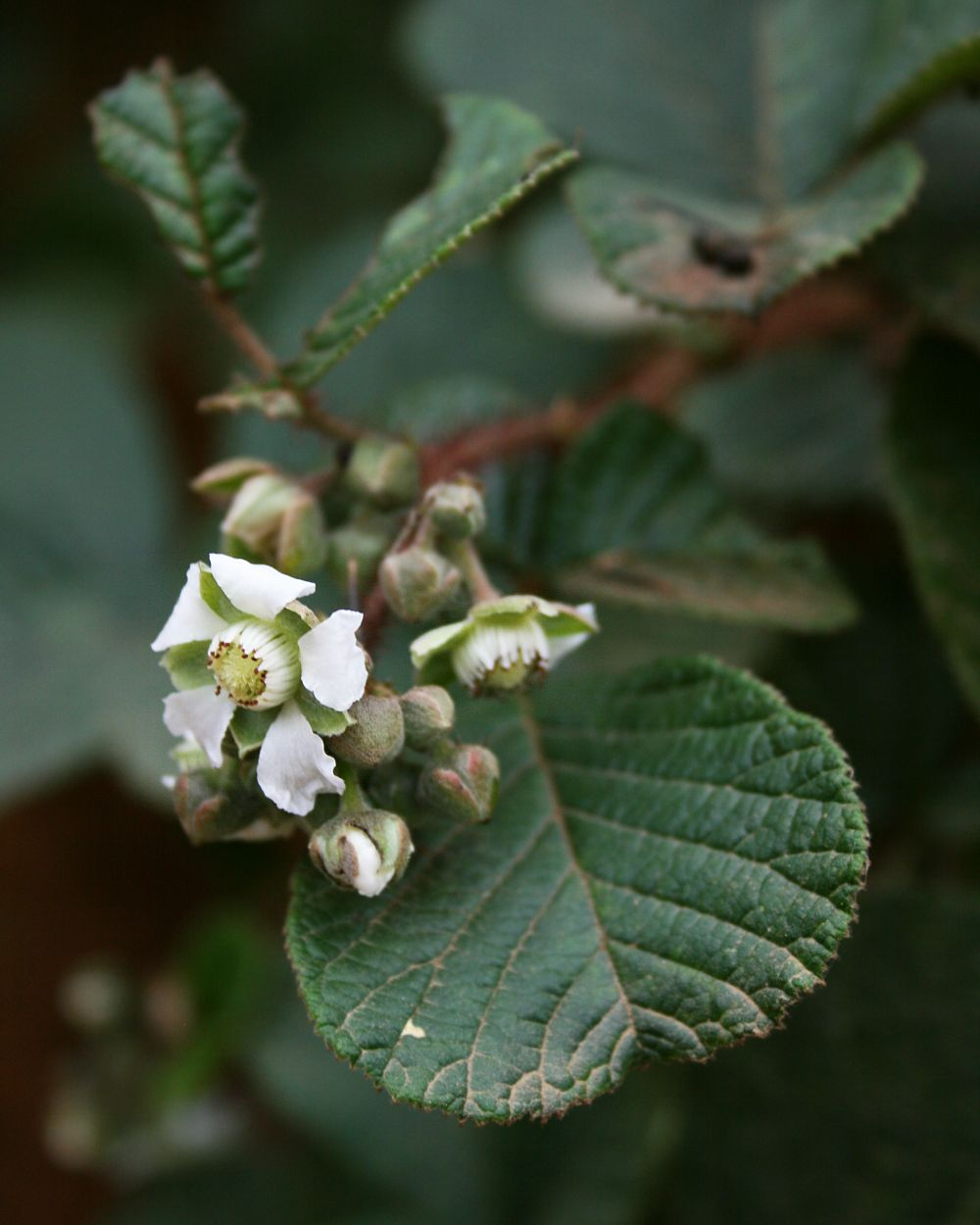
R. ellipticus var. obcordatus leaves and flowers

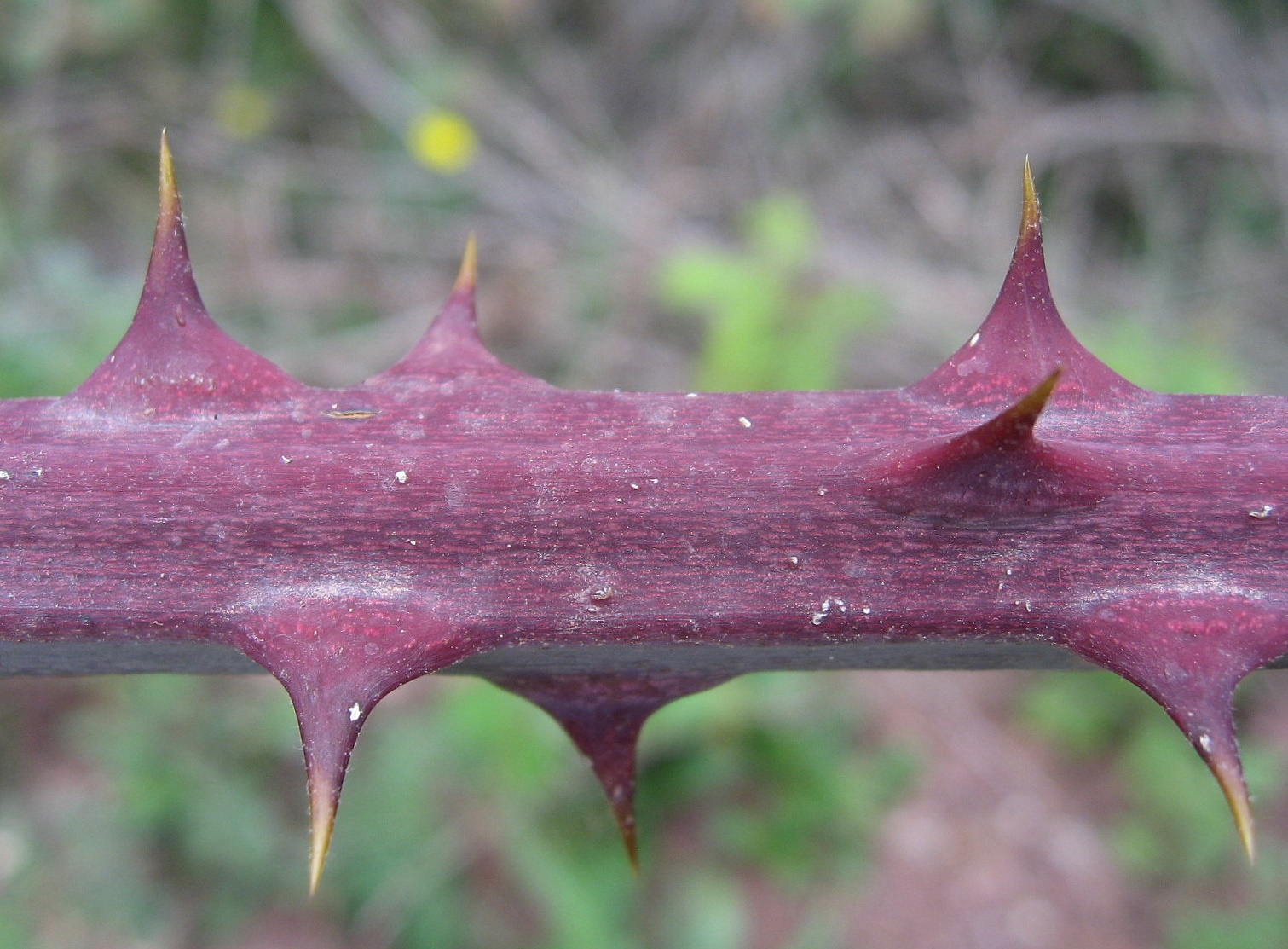
R. ulmifolius prickles

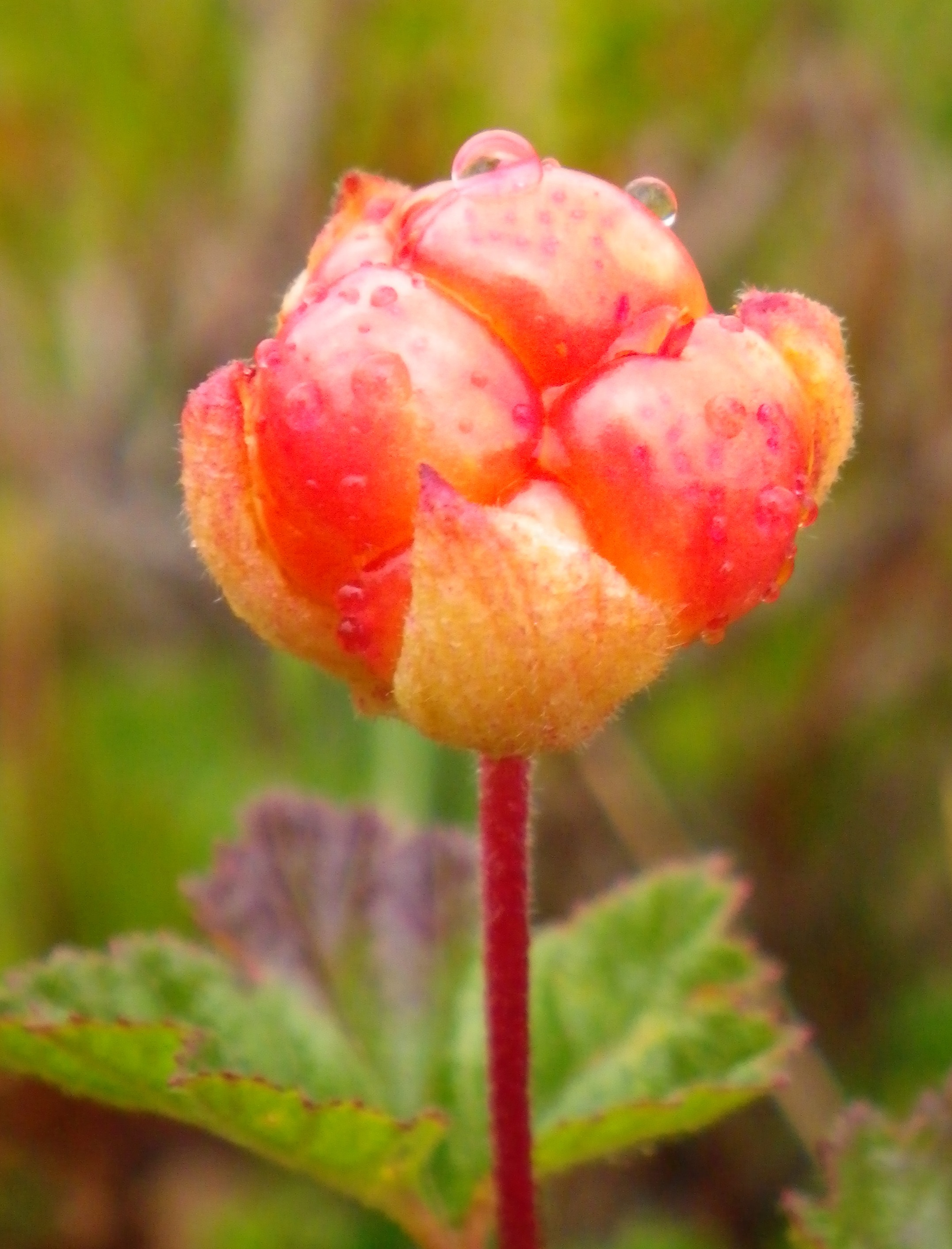
R. chamaemorus fruit

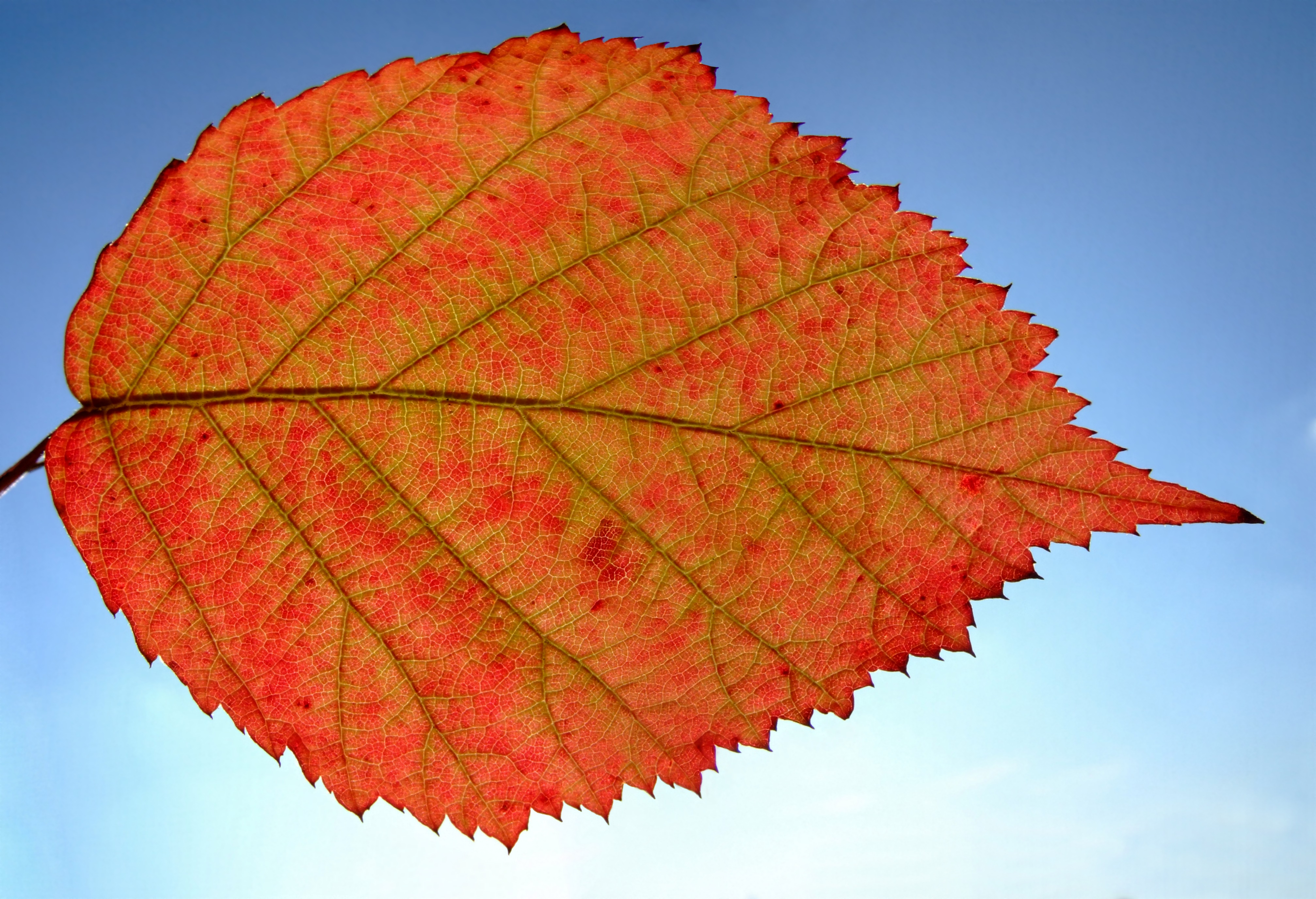
R. caesius leaf

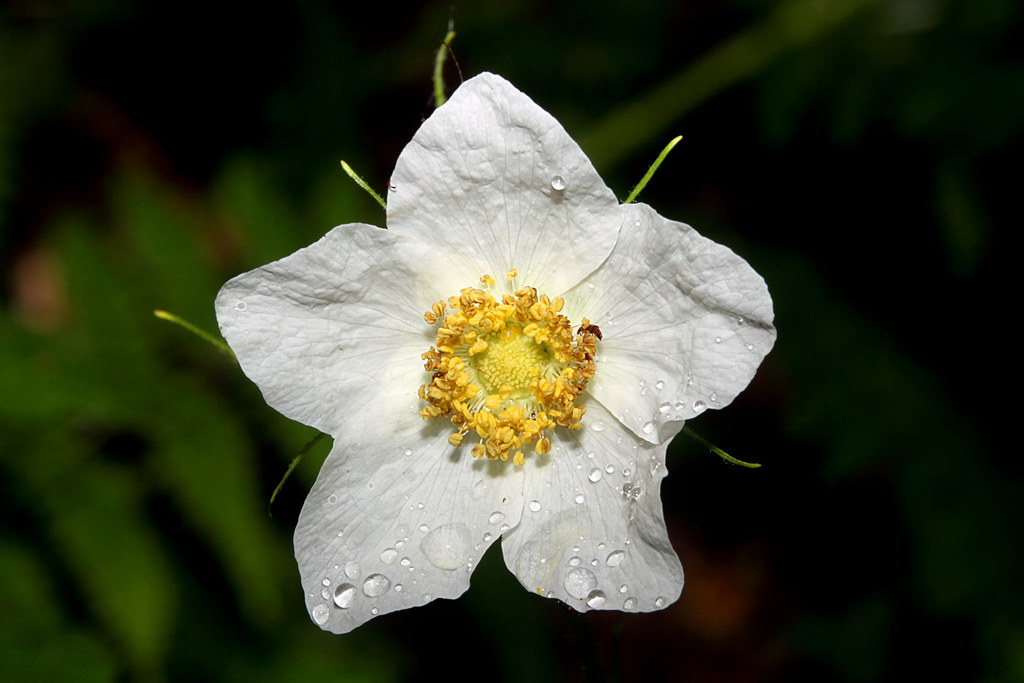
R. parviflorus flower

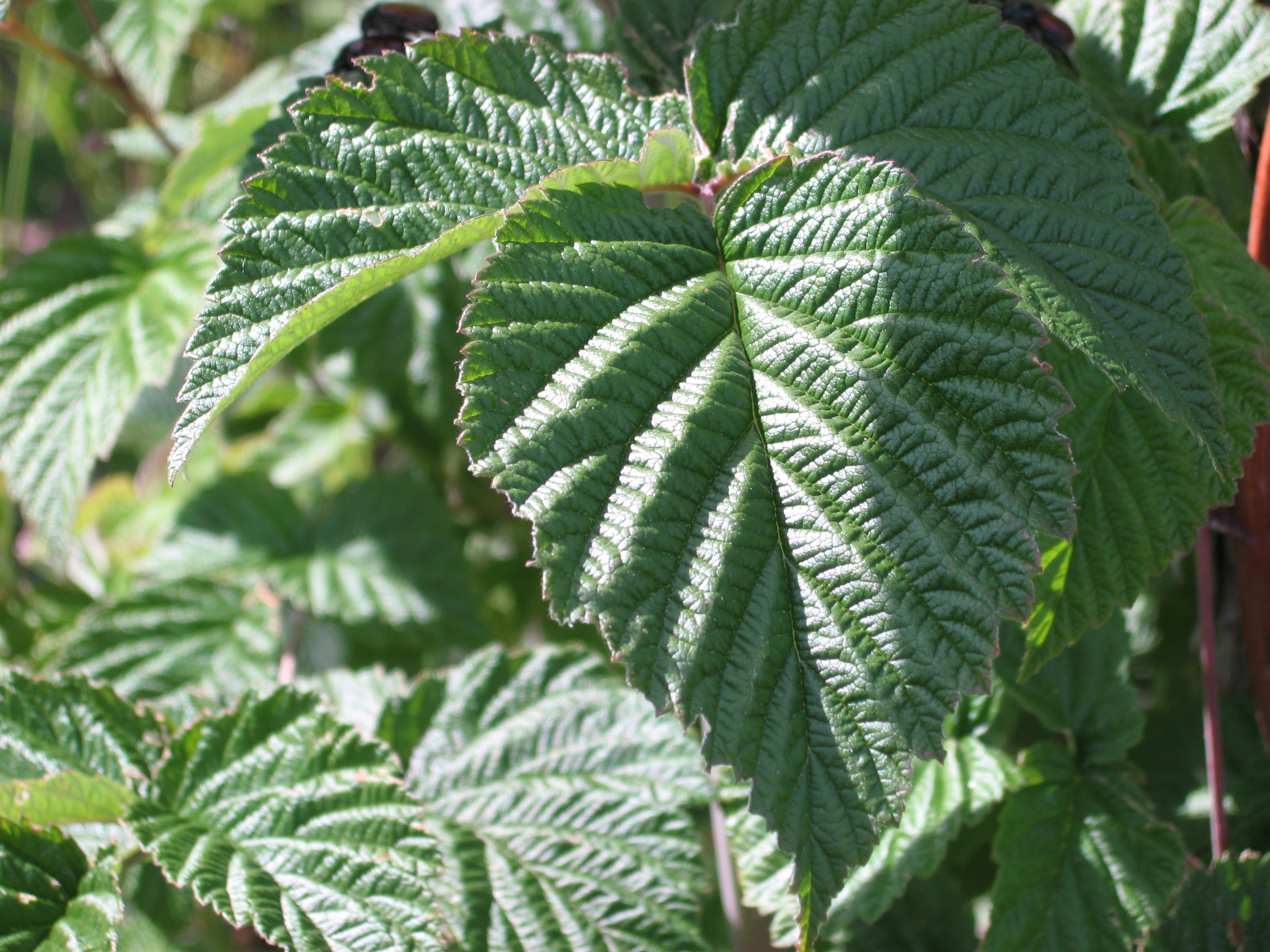
R. idaeus leaves

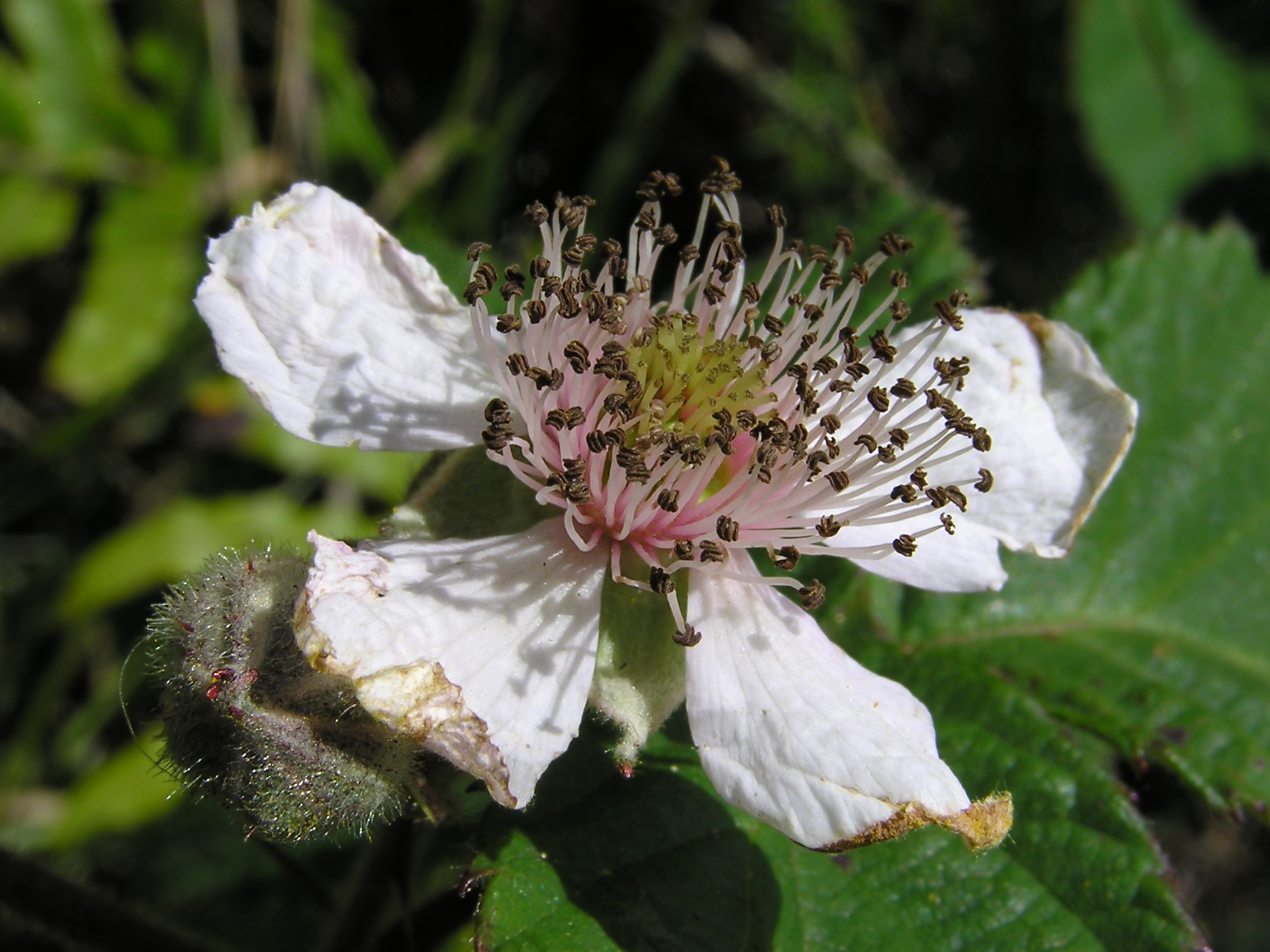
R. fruticosus flower

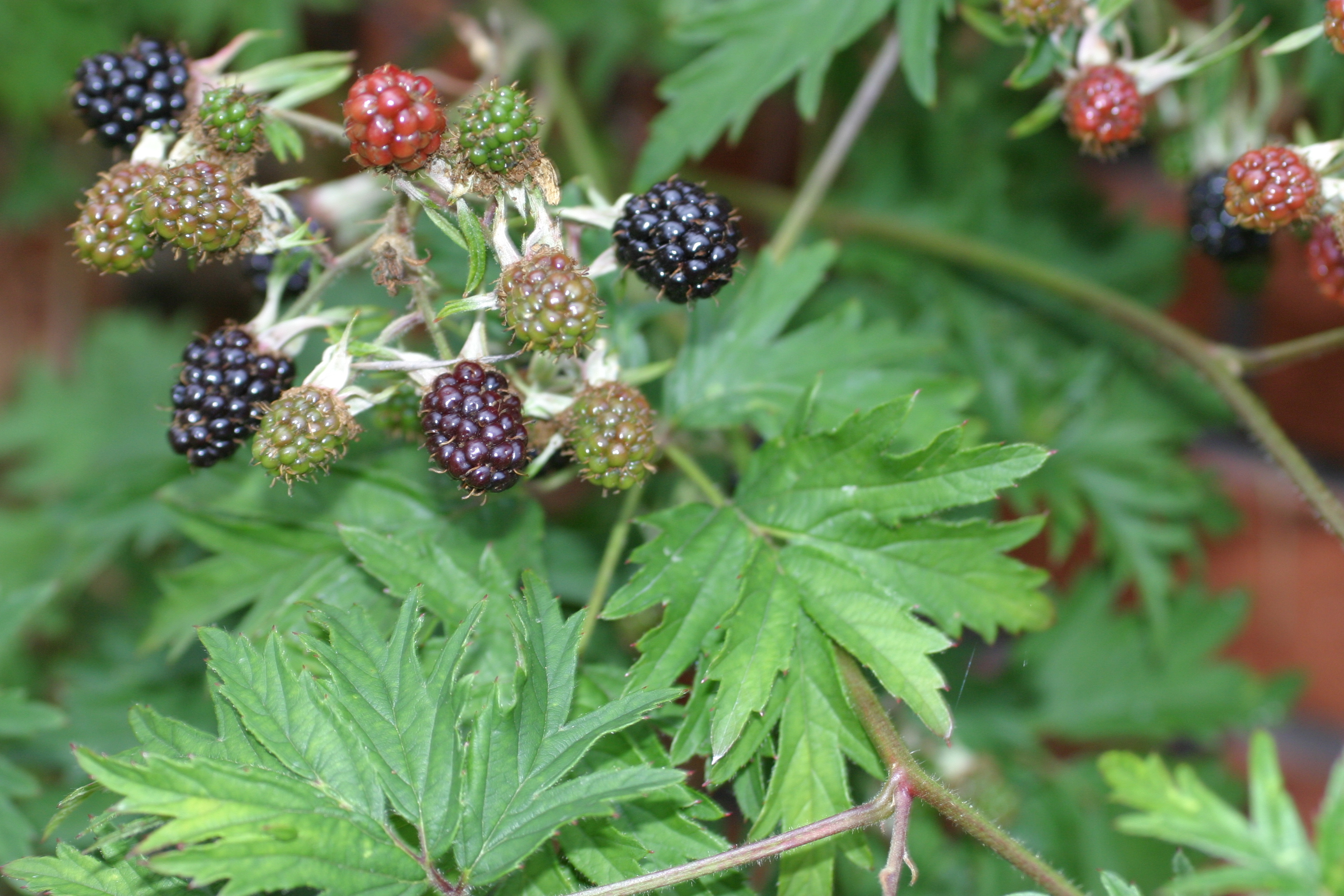
R. laciniatus berries

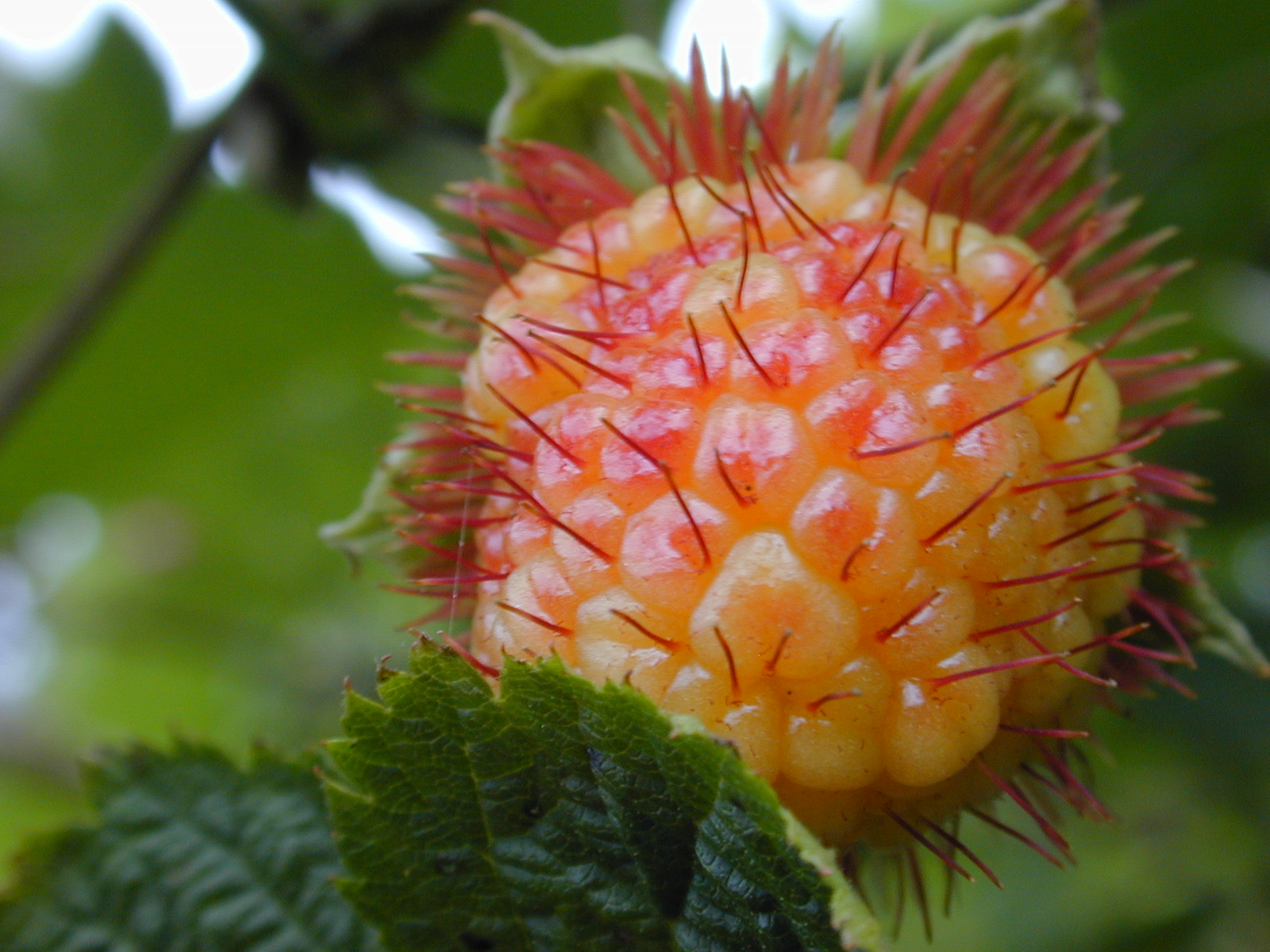
R. hawaiensis berry

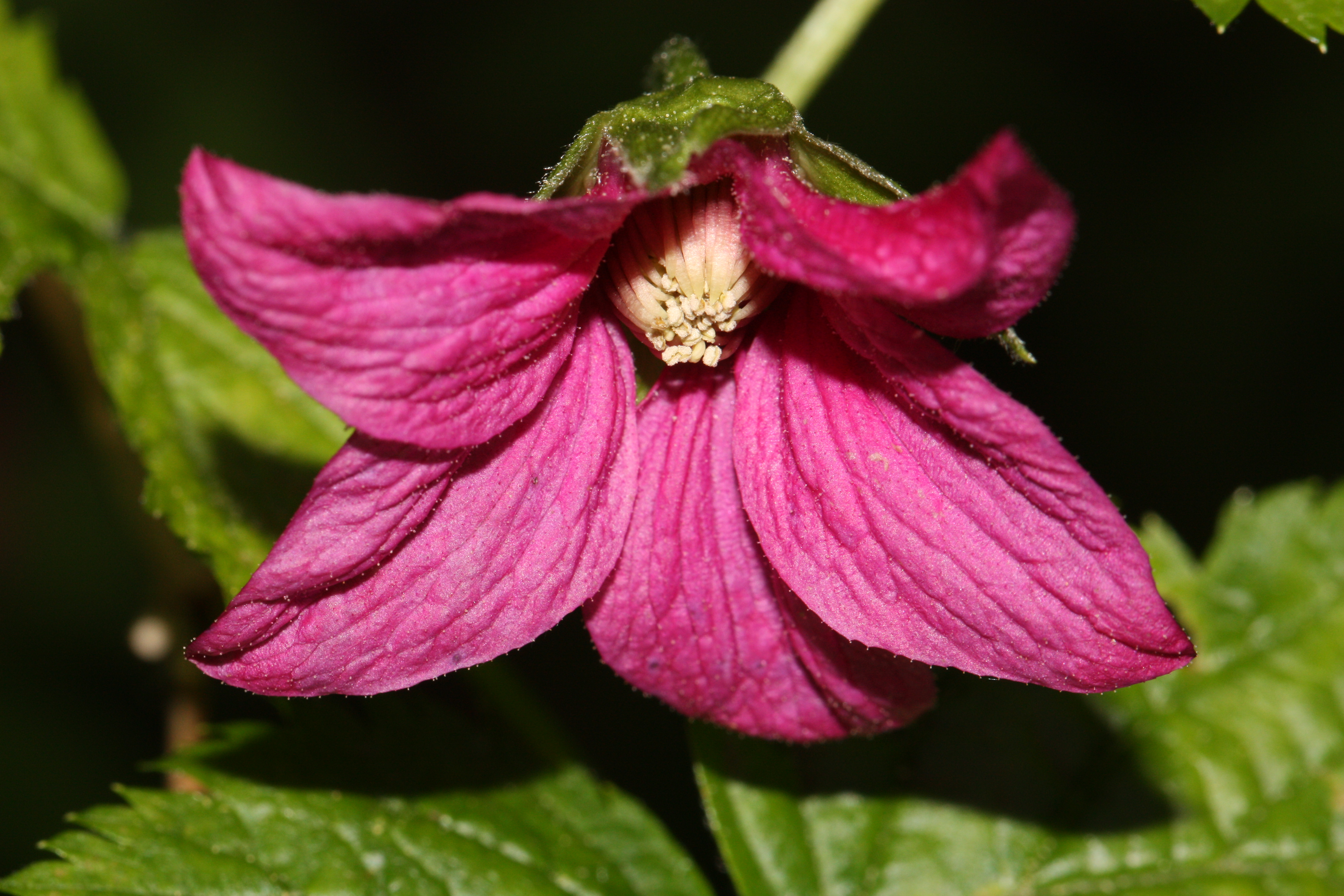
R. spectabilis var. spectabilis flower

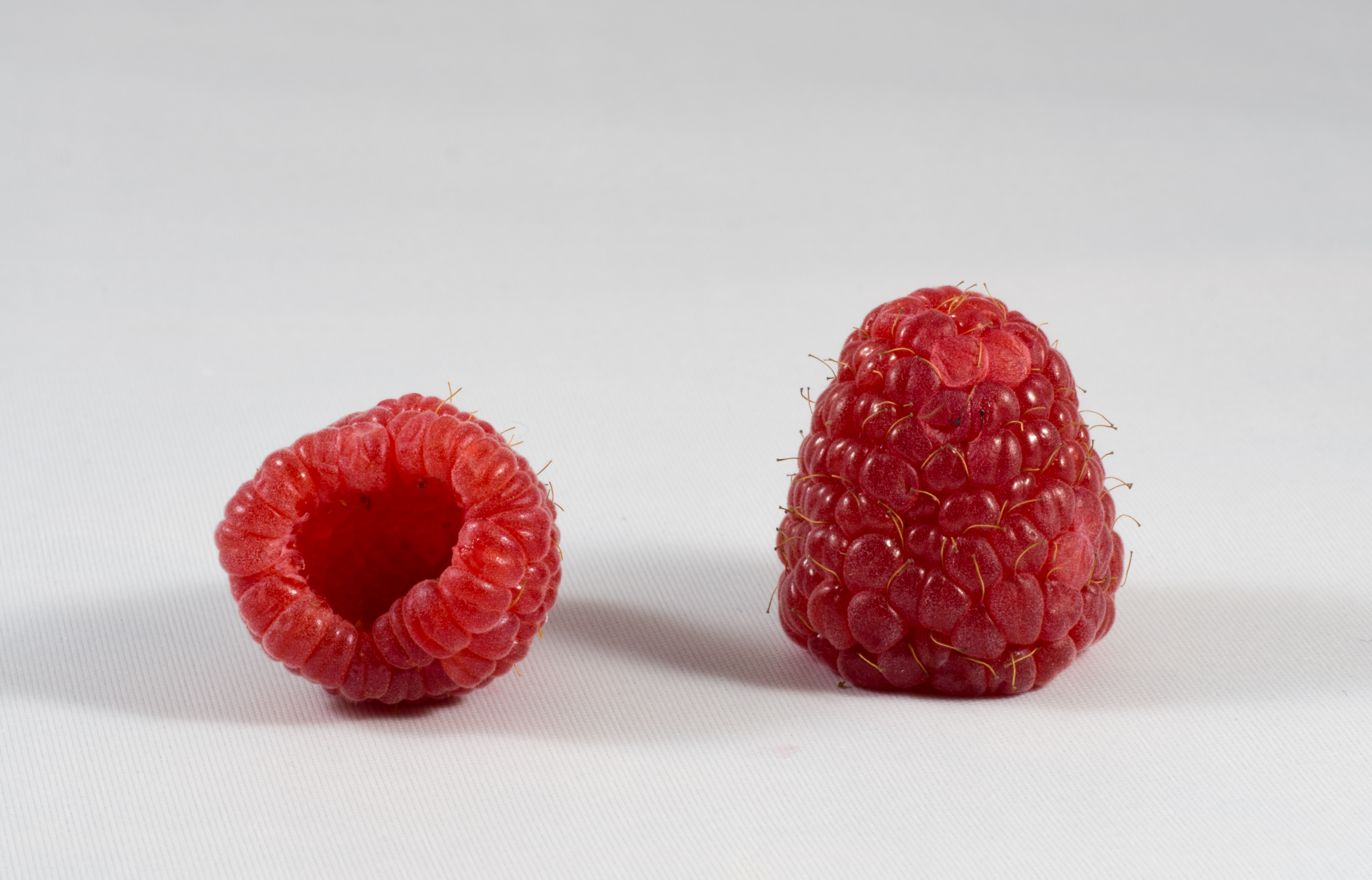
Commercially produced R. strigosus raspberries

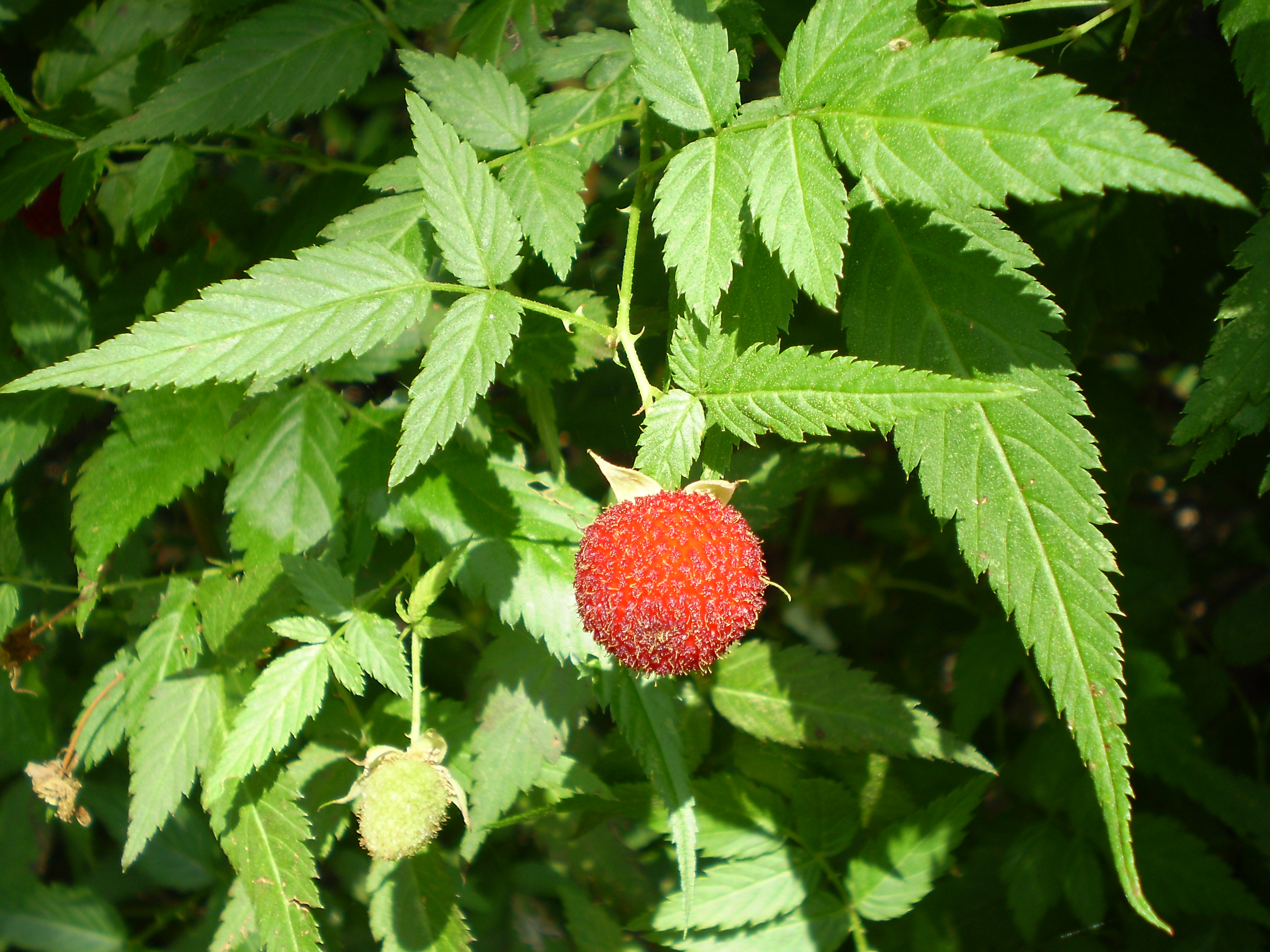
R. rosifolius leaves and berry

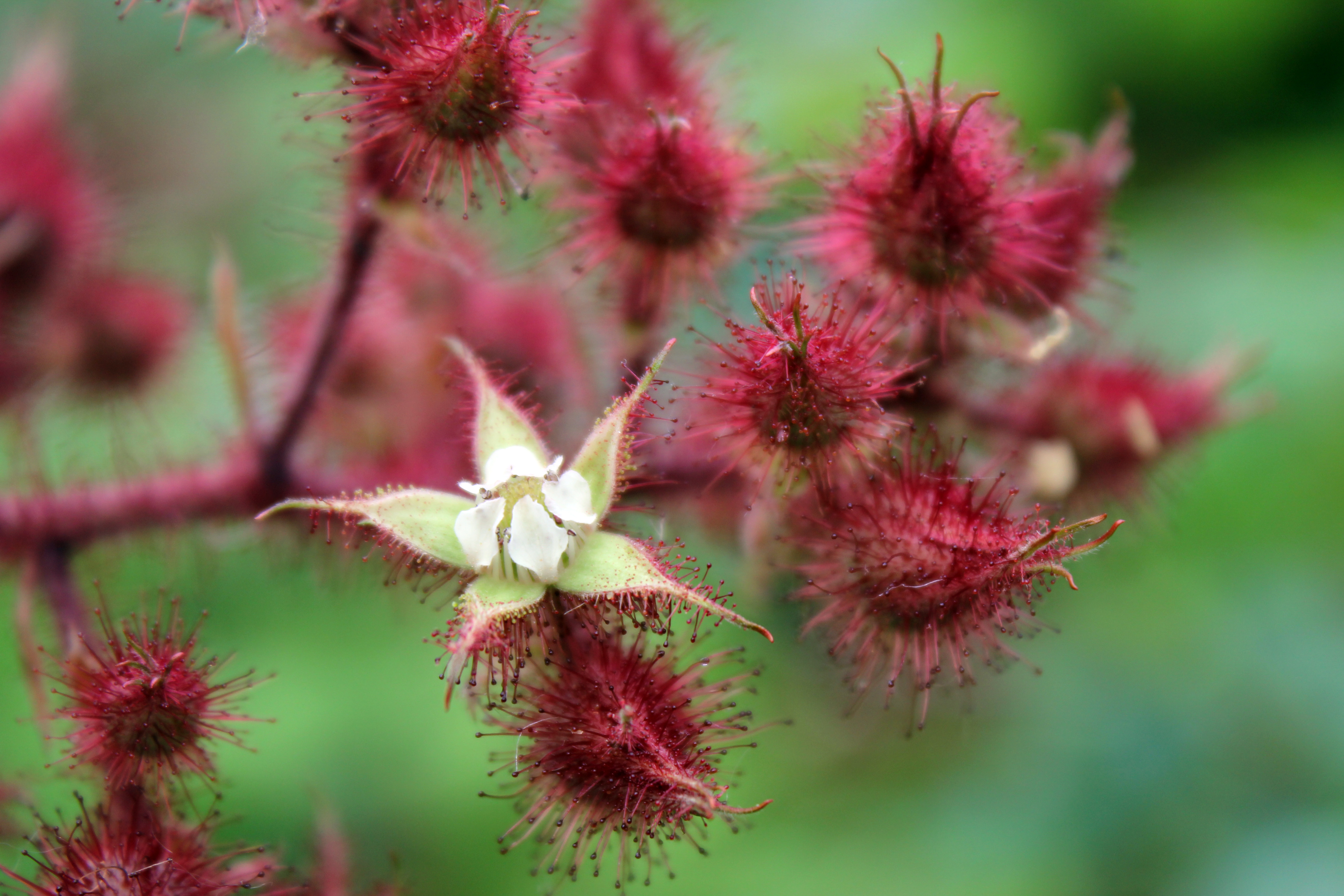
R. phoenicolasius flowers

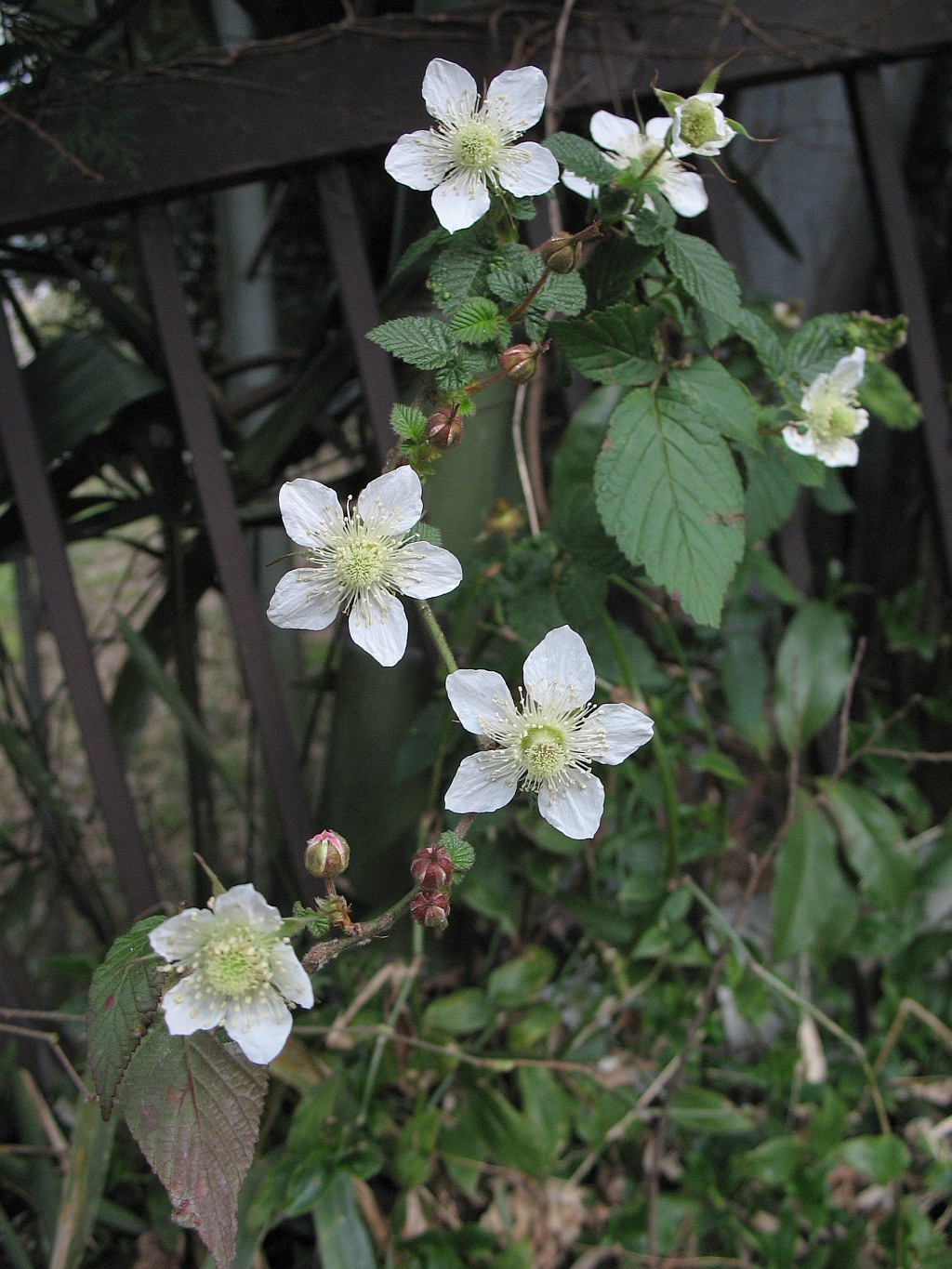
R. hirsutus flowers

Rubus is a diverse genus, with estimates of the number of species varying from 250 to over 1,000, found across all continents except Antarctica. Better-known species include:

- Rubus aboriginum – garden dewberry
- Rubus allegheniensis – Allegheny blackberry
- Rubus arcticus – Arctic raspberry
- Rubus argutus – sawtooth raspberry
- Rubus armeniacus – Himalayan blackberry
- Rubus caesius – European dewberry
- Rubus canadensis – smooth blackberry
- Rubus chamaemorus – cloudberry
- Rubus cockburnianus – white-stemmed bramble
- Rubus coreanus – bokbunja
- Rubus crataegifolius - santtalgi
- Rubus deliciosus
- Rubus domingensis
- Rubus ellipticus
- Rubus flagellaris – northern dewberry
- Rubus fraxinifolius – mountain raspberry
- Rubus glaucus
- Rubus hawaiensis
- Rubus hispidus – swamp dewberry
- Rubus idaeus – red raspberry
- Rubus illecebrosus
- Rubus laciniatus – cut-leaved blackberry
- Rubus leucodermis – whitebark raspberry
- Rubus moluccanus
- Rubus nepalensis
- Rubus nivalis – snow raspberry
- Rubus niveus
- Rubus occidentalis – black raspberry
- Rubus odoratus – purple-flowered raspberry
- Rubus parviflorus – thimbleberry
- Rubus pedatus
- Rubus pensilvanicus – Pennsylvania blackberry
- Rubus phoenicolasius – wineberry
- Rubus probus
- Rubus pubescens – dwarf raspberry
- Rubus rosifolius – roseleaf bramble
- Rubus saxatilis – stone bramble
- Rubus spectabilis – salmonberry
- Rubus tricolor
- Rubus trivialis – Southern dewberry
- Rubus ulmifolius – elm-leaved blackberry
- Rubus ursinus – trailing blackberry
- Rubus vestitus – European blackberry

A more complete subdivision is as follows:

- Subgenus Anoplobatus
  - Rubus deliciosus
  - Rubus neomexicanus
  - Rubus odoratus
  - Rubus parviflorus
- Subgenus Chamaebatus
  - Rubus calycinus
  - Rubus hayata-koidzumii
  - Rubus nivalis
  - Rubus pectinellus
- Subgenus Chamaemorus
  - Rubus chamaemorus
- Subgenus Comaropsis
  - Rubus geoides
- Subgenus Cylactis
  - Rubus arcticus
  - Rubus fockeanus
  - Rubus humulifolius
  - Rubus lasiococcus
  - Rubus pedatus
  - Rubus saxatilis
  - Rubus sierrae
  - Rubus xanthocarpus
- Subgenus Diemenicus
  - Rubus gunnianus
- Subgenus Dalibardastrum
  - Rubus amphidasys
  - Rubus nepalensis
  - Rubus tricolor
  - Rubus tsangiorum
- Subgenus Idaeobatus
  - Rubus acuminatissimus
  - Rubus adenophorus (syn. R. sagatus)
  - Rubus alexeterius
  - Rubus alpestris
  - Rubus amabilis
  - Rubus apetalus
  - Rubus archboldianus
  - Rubus aurantiacus
  - Rubus biflorus
  - Rubus chingii
  - Rubus cockburnianus
  - Rubus columellaris
  - Rubus copelandii
  - Rubus corchorifolius
  - Rubus coreanus
  - Rubus crataegifolius
  - Rubus croceacanthus
  - Rubus ellipticus
  - Rubus eustephanos
  - Rubus flosculosus
  - Rubus fraxinifolius
  - Rubus glabricarpus
  - Rubus glaucifolius
  - Rubus grayanus
  - Rubus hawaiensis
  - Rubus hirsutus
  - Rubus hoffmeisterianus
  - Rubus hypargyrus
  - Rubus idaeus
  - Rubus illecebrosus
  - Rubus innominatus
  - Rubus inopertus
  - Rubus irritans
  - Rubus komarovii
  - Rubus lasiostylus
  - Rubus leucodermis
  - Rubus ludwigii
  - Rubus lutescens
  - Rubus macilentus
  - Rubus macraei
  - Rubus mesogaeus
  - Rubus microphyllus
  - Rubus minusculus
  - Rubus niveus
  - Rubus occidentalis
  - Rubus palmatus
  - Rubus parvifolius
  - Rubus peltatus
  - Rubus pentagonus
  - Rubus phoenicolasius
  - Rubus pileatus
  - Rubus pinfaensis
  - Rubus pinnatus
  - Rubus probus
  - Rubus pungens
  - Rubus queenslandicus
  - Rubus racemosus
  - Rubus rigidus
  - Rubus rosifolius
  - Rubus sachalinensis
  - Rubus simplex
  - Rubus spectabilis
  - Rubus stans
  - Rubus suavissimus
  - Rubus subornatus
  - Rubus sumatranus
  - Rubus teledapos
  - Rubus thibetanus
  - Rubus trianthus
  - Rubus trifidus
  - Rubus vernus
- Subgenus Lampobatus
  - Rubus acanthophyllos
  - Rubus adenothallus
  - Rubus adenotrichos
  - Rubus betonicifolius
  - Rubus bogotensis
  - Rubus briareus
  - Rubus bullatus
  - Rubus choachiensis
  - Rubus coriaceus
  - Rubus costaricanus
  - Rubus eggersii
  - Rubus eriocarpus
  - Rubus fagifolius
  - Rubus florulentus
  - Rubus gachetensis
  - Rubus giganteus
  - Rubus glabratus
  - Rubus glaucus
  - Rubus hondurensis
  - Rubus imperialis
  - Rubus irasuensis
  - Rubus macvaughianus
  - Rubus megalococcus
  - Rubus nubigenus
  - Rubus peruvianus
  - Rubus roseus
  - Rubus sapidus
  - Rubus shankii
  - Rubus trichomallus
  - Rubus turquinensis
- Subgenus Malachobatus
  - Rubus acuminatus
  - Rubus alceifolius
  - Rubus assamensis
  - Rubus bambusarum
  - Rubus buergeri
  - Rubus chroosepalus
  - Rubus chrysophyllus
  - Rubus elongatus
  - Rubus fairholmianus
  - Rubus flagelliflorus
  - Rubus fockei
  - Rubus formosensis
  - Rubus gardnerianus
  - Rubus glomeratus
  - Rubus henryi
  - Rubus hunanensis
  - Rubus ichangensis
  - Rubus irenaeus
  - Rubus kawakamii
  - Rubus lambertianus
  - Rubus lineatus
  - Rubus moluccanus
  - Rubus multibracteatus
  - Rubus paniculatus
  - Rubus parkeri
  - Rubus pseudosieboldii
  - Rubus pyrifolius
  - Rubus rolfei
  - Rubus rugosus
  - Rubus setchuenensis
  - Rubus sieboldii
  - Rubus splendidissimus
  - Rubus swinhoei
  - Rubus tephrodes
  - Rubus tiliaceus
  - Rubus wardii
  - Rubus xanthoneurus
- Subgenus Micranthobatus
  - Rubus australis
  - Rubus cissoides
  - Rubus moorei
  - Rubus nebulosus
  - Rubus parvus
  - Rubus schmidelioides
  - Rubus squarrosus
- Subgenus Orobatus
  - Rubus loxensis
- Subgenus Rubus (formerly known as subgenus Eubatus)
  - Sections
    - Sect. Allegheniensis
      - Rubus allegheniensis
      - Rubus alumnus
      - Rubus pennus
      - Rubus pugnax
      - Rubus rosa – rose blackberry
    - Sect. Arguti
      - Rubus abactus
      - Rubus ablatus
      - Rubus andrewsianus
      - Rubus argutus
      - Rubus densissimus
      - Rubus frondosus – Yankee blackberry
      - Rubus laudatus
      - Rubus mollior
      - Rubus multispinus
      - Rubus oklahomus
      - Rubus orarius
      - Rubus ostryifolius
      - Rubus pensilvanicus
      - Rubus philadelphicus
      - Rubus recurvans – recurved blackberry
      - Rubus subsolanus
    - Sect. Caesii
      - Rubus caesius
    - Sect. Canadenses
      - Rubus canadensis
      - Rubus kennedyanus
    - Sect. Corylifolii
      - Rubus adenoleucus
      - Rubus aureolus
      - Rubus babingtonianus
      - Rubus britannicus
      - Rubus camptostachys
      - Rubus conjungens
      - Rubus cyclomorphus
      - Rubus dissimulans
      - Rubus dumetorum
      - Rubus eluxatus
      - Rubus fabrimontanus
      - Rubus fioniae
      - Rubus gothicus
      - Rubus lamprocaulos
      - Rubus mortensenii
      - Rubus nemorosus
      - Rubus seebergensis
      - Rubus tuberculatus
      - Rubus wahlbergii
    - Sect. Cuneifolii
      - Rubus cuneifolius
    - Sect. Hispidi
      - Rubus fulleri
      - Rubus hispidus
    - Sect. Procumbentes (formerly known as Sect. Flagellares)
      - Rubus aboriginum
      - Rubus baileyanus
      - Rubus bushii
      - Rubus celer
      - Rubus centralis
      - Rubus curtipes
      - Rubus deamii
      - Rubus depavitus
      - Rubus enslenii
      - Rubus exsularis
      - Rubus fecundus
      - Rubus ferrofluvius
      - Rubus flagellaris
      - Rubus fraternalis
      - Rubus grimesii
      - Rubus hancinianus
      - Rubus heterophyllus
      - Rubus invisus
      - Rubus ithacanus
      - Rubus kentuckiensis
      - Rubus leviculus
      - Rubus meracus
      - Rubus michiganensis
      - Rubus multifer – Kinnikinnick dewberry
      - Rubus multiformis
      - Rubus profusiflorus
      - Rubus roribaccus – Lucretia dewberry
      - Rubus satis
      - Rubus steelei
    - Sect. Rubus
      - Rubus acheruntinus
      - Rubus adornatus
      - Rubus adspersus
      - Rubus ahenifolius
      - Rubus alterniflorus
      - Rubus ammobius
      - Rubus amplificatus
      - Rubus anglocandicans
      - Rubus angustifrons
      - Rubus armeniacus (syn. R. discolor)
      - Rubus arrhenii
      - Rubus atrichantherus
      - Rubus axillaris
      - Rubus bakerianus
      - Rubus bavaricus
      - Rubus bayeri
      - Rubus bertramii
      - Rubus bifrons – Himalayan blackberry
      - Rubus bloxamianus
      - Rubus bloxamii
      - Rubus bollei
      - Rubus boreanus
      - Rubus braeuckeri
      - Rubus bregutiensis
      - Rubus calvatus
      - Rubus canescens – woolly blackberry
      - Rubus cardiophyllus
      - Rubus caucasicus
      - Rubus chlorothyrsos
      - Rubus chrysoxylon
      - Rubus cimbricus
      - Rubus cissburiensis
      - Rubus clusii
      - Rubus colemannii
      - Rubus concolor
      - Rubus conothyrsoides
      - Rubus cordifolius
      - Rubus cyri
      - Rubus dasyphyllus
      - Rubus divaricatus
      - Rubus diversus
      - Rubus drejeri
      - Rubus dumnoniensis
      - Rubus echinatoides
      - Rubus echinatus
      - Rubus egregius
      - Rubus eianus
      - Rubus ergii
      - Rubus errabundus
      - Rubus erythrops
      - Rubus fissus
      - Rubus foliosus
      - Rubus formidabilis
      - Rubus furvicolor
      - Rubus fuscoater
      - Rubus fuscus
      - Rubus gelertii
      - Rubus georgicus
      - Rubus glandithyrsos
      - Rubus glanduliger
      - Rubus glandulosus
      - Rubus gordonii
      - Rubus grabowskii
      - Rubus gratus
      - Rubus gremlii
      - RUbus hartmanii
      - Rubus hirtus
      - Rubus hylophilus
      - Rubus ieri
      - Rubus inermis
      - Rubus infestus
      - Rubus insularis
      - Rubus laciniatus
      - Rubus lamprophyllus
      - Rubus lespinassei
      - Rubus leucostachys
      - Rubus linkianus
      - Rubus macrophyllus
      - Rubus magurensis non Nyár. (1956)
      - Rubus micans
      - Rubus miszczenkoi
      - Rubus montanus
      - Rubus moschus
      - Rubus mucronulatus
      - Rubus mulleri
      - Rubus nessensis
      - Rubus nigricans (syn. pedemontanus).
      - Rubus nitidoides
      - Rubus pedatifolius
      - Rubus piceetorum
      - Rubus plicatus
      - Rubus polyanthemus
      - Rubus praecox
      - Rubus promachonicus
      - Rubus pyramidalis
      - Rubus radula
      - Rubus rhamnifolius
      - Rubus rosaceus
      - Rubus rubritinctus
      - Rubus rudis
      - Rubus sanctus
      - Rubus scheutzii
      - Rubus schlechtendalii
      - Rubus schleicheri
      - Rubus senticosus
      - Rubus separinus
      - Rubus septentrionalis
      - Rubus slesvicensis
      - Rubus sprengelii
      - Rubus sulcatus
      - Rubus thrysiflorus
      - Rubus ulmifolius
      - Rubus vestitus – European blackberry
      - Rubus vigorosus
      - Rubus vulgaris
    - Sect. Setosi (bristleberries)
      - Rubus dissensus
      - Rubus groutianus
      - Rubus junceus
      - Rubus missouricus
      - Rubus regionalis
      - Rubus semisetosus – swamp bristleberry
      - Rubus setosus
      - Rubus stipulatus
      - Rubus superioris
      - Rubus uniformis
      - Rubus vermontanus – Vermont bristleberry
      - Rubus wheeleri
      - Rubus wisconsinensis
    - Sect. Ursini (Pacific berries)
      - Rubus × loganobaccus
      - Rubus ursinus
    - Sect. Verotriviales (Southern dewberries)
      - Rubus ictus
      - Rubus lucidus
      - Rubus riograndis
      - Rubus sons
      - Rubus trivialis

==== Hybrid berries ====
The term "hybrid berry" is often used collectively for those fruits in the genus Rubus, which have been developed mainly in the U.S. and U.K. in the last 130 years. As Rubus species readily interbreed and are apomicts (able to set seed without fertilisation), the parentage of these plants is often highly complex, but is generally agreed to include cultivars of blackberries (R. ursinus, R. fruticosus) and raspberries (R. idaeus). The British National Collection of Rubus stands at over 200 species, and although not within the scope of the National Collection, also hold many cultivars.

The hybrid berries include:-

- loganberry (California, U.S., 1883) R. ×loganobaccus, a spontaneous hybrid between R. ursinus 'Aughinbaugh' and R. idaeus 'Red Antwerp'
- boysenberry (U.S., 1920s) - a hybrid between R. idaeus and R. × loganobaccus
- nectarberry - a suspected variant of boysenberry, a hybrid between R. idaeus and R. × loganobaccus
- olallieberry (U.S., 1930s) - a hybrid between the loganberry and youngberry, themselves both hybrid berries
- veitchberry (Europe, 1930s) - a hybrid between R. fruticosus and R. idaeus
- skellyberry (Texas, U.S., 2000s) - a hybrid between R. invisus and R. phoenicolasius
- marionberry (1956) - now thought to be a blackberry cultivar R. 'Marion'
- silvanberry - R. 'Silvan', a hybrid between R. 'Marion' and boysenberry
- tayberry (Dundee, Scotland, 1979) - another blackberry/raspberry hybrid
- tummelberry, R. 'Tummel' - from the same Scottish breeding programme as the tayberry
- hildaberry (1980s) - a tayberry/boysenberry hybrid discovered by an amateur grower
- youngberry - a complex hybrid of raspberries, blackberries, and dewberries

=== Etymology ===
The generic name means blackberry in Latin and was derived from the word ruber, meaning "red".

The blackberries, as well as various other Rubus species with mounding or rambling growth habits, are often called brambles. However, this name is not used for those like the raspberry that grow as upright canes, or for trailing or prostrate species, such as most dewberries, or various low-growing boreal, arctic, or alpine species. The scientific study of brambles is known as "batology". "Bramble" comes from Old English bræmbel, a variant of bræmel.

== See also ==
- Mulberry, an unrelated deciduous tree with similar-looking fruit
