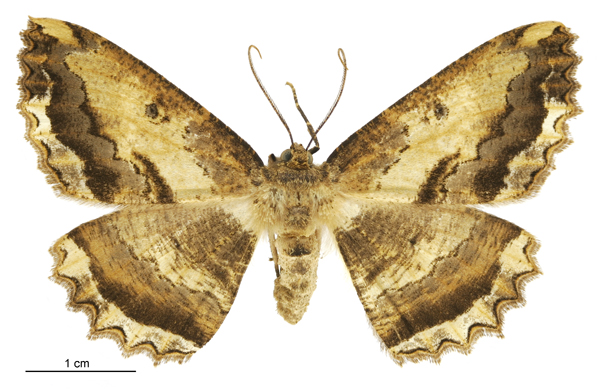

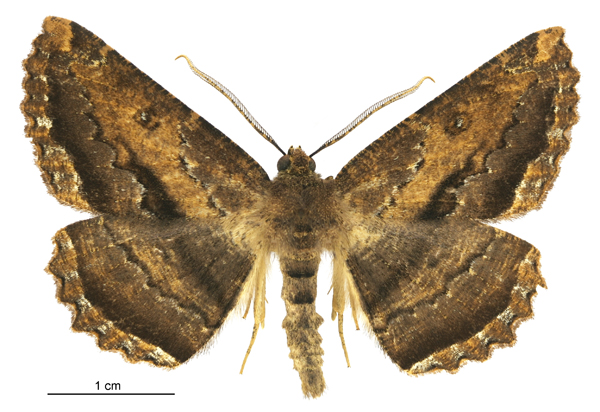
- Female (top) and male (bottom)

Scientific classification
- Kingdom: Animalia
- Phylum: Arthropoda
- Class: Insecta
- Order: Lepidoptera
- Family: Geometridae
- Genus: Gellonia
- Species: G. dejectaria

Binomial name
- Gellonia dejectaria (Walker, 1860)

Synonyms
- Boarmia dejectaria Walker, 1860; Selidosema dejectaria Walker, 1860; Boarmia attracta Walker, 1860; Boarmia exprompta Walker, 1860; Tephrosia patularia Walker, 1860; Selidosema dejectaria Walker, 1860; Scotosia erebinata Walker, 1862; Scotosia lignosata Walker, 1862; Hemerophila caprimulgata Felder & Rogenhofer, 1875

= Gellonia dejectaria =

Species of moth

Gellonia dejectaria, the brown evening moth, is a species of moth in the family Geometridae. The species was first described by Francis Walker in 1860. It is endemic to New Zealand.

Gellonia dejectaria larvae eat the leaves of the māhoe, supplejack and bush lawyer plants.

== Description ==
A male Gellonia dejectaria was originally described by Francis Walker as being slender bodied with a deep brown top and a yellow ashy colored underside and the middle leg segment of the back legs were thick. The antennae have narrow parallel projections like a comb going all the way to the tip (a trait only found in males). He described the wings being big and freckled with a dull brick-red color, having thin black lines on the inside and outside of the upper surface of the wing, having an almost black dot on the fore wing (larger wing) that has a white spot inside that dot. Another thing Walker noted was the presence of a wide band on the underside of the wing and brown dots on the undersides closer to the moth’s body.

The wingspan of the brown evening moth can get up to 2 inches (5.08 cm) in width. It also usually has a white dot in the middle of the outer edge of the forewing (larger wing). It can be difficult to identify this insect because it is very inconsistent but the larger wings and body with very slanted crosswise lines on the forewing (larger wing) will distinguish it from other species that are similar.

The larvae or caterpillar of the brown evening moth are quite variable in their color usually depending on which food plant they are feeding on and their surroundings, but they do have a distinctive large hump that can be seen on the third segment of the body of the caterpillar. Some examples of color variations of the caterpillar include; color of the twigs of a mahoe plant (Melicytus ramiflorus), a dark reddish-brown when they are found on a white rata or Akatorotoro plant (Metrosideros perforata) when the caterpillar is found on poroporo plant (Solanum aviculare) they are a purply black color, and when the caterpillar is found on a fuchsia (Fuchsia excorticata) plant are pale green olive color with hints of brown on the body which is very similar to the color of the new sprouting twigs of the plant. Not only are the caterpillars difficult to identify because of their color variation but they will often change their appearance to blend into their surroundings especially during the early stages of their life. The caterpillars have been known to tuck their first and second pairs of legs very closely to their body and then they will position their third pair of legs into a position that is straight downwards in an attempt to make themselves look like a broken thorn or a twig trying to make themselves blend into their food plants branches which is a common behavior for most Geometrid Moths. When at rest though the position of the legs of the legs is very specifically unique to the caterpillar or larvae of the brown evening moth.

The eggs of the brown evening moth are roughly 1/32 inch (0.079 cm) in length and have an irregularly oval shape. The eggs are usually a dark green color and are covered with a series of quite large hexagonal indentations. The hexagonal shapes on the eggs have at each of the angles there is a very small very bright white point. As the eggs become more developed, they will take on a much darker reddish-brown color but the very small very bright white points on the angles of the hexagon will remain bright white. The appearance of the eggs can be described generally as very impressive vivid speckled appearance.

== Range ==
=== Natural global range ===
The brown evening moth is an endemic species to New Zealand, and to current knowledge it is not found anywhere outside of New Zealand.

=== New Zealand range ===
Within New Zealand, the brown evening moth is very common and can be found all over the entire country from larger towns and cities to out in the wilderness. Outside of the mainland the brown evening moth has also been found to be on Stewart Island in Southland New Zealand.

== Habitat ==
This species is very common and can be found most anywhere in New Zealand, but they are usually found in shrublands and native forests of New Zealand resting on logs with their wings folded flatly on their back when not in a setting that has been modified by humans or built upon. They are very often observed around people though with most of their sightings taking place on buildings like outhouses, sheds, and even shaded walls of homes throughout New Zealand and even onto Stewart Island.

== Ecology ==
=== Life cycle/phenology ===
The brown evening moth starts its life as an egg which can be found laid loosely on a wide variety of plants spread on irregular branches and attached to each other loosely on a wide variety of food plants including mahoe (Melicytus ramiflorus), white rata also called the akatorotoro plant (Metrosideros perforata), and the poroporo plant (Solanum aviculare). The larvae of Gellonia dejectaria can usually be found during the whole of the New Zealand summer into early autumn (roughly December until March). The usual brood of larvae will usually become fully grown (1.5 inches or longer) late in the fall then go into a pupal stage in which they form a chamber roughly 1 to 2 inches under the soil surface then emerge around November to May. According to Gaskin and Hudson, there are at least two different broods of brown evening moths and maybe even a third determined by their phenology (timing of significant events in the insect’s life). The second of the broods undergoes the whole winter in a pupal stage before emerging in the early spring. The third brood likely emerges near the end of summer (February) and then hibernates as adults because the adults have been known to come to light on winter nights in June and July.

=== Diet and foraging ===
The larval stages of the brown evening moth will consume a wide variety of plants in New Zealand, to name a few known food plants they have been known to eat mahoe (Melicytus ramiflorus), swamp lawyer (Rubus australis), tutu (Coriaria arborea), kareao or supplejack (Ripogonum scandens), white rata or Akatorotoro (Metrosideros perforata), poroporo (Solanum aviculare), and houpara (Pseudopanax lessonii). The adult stages of the brown evening moth are nectar feeding pollinators and have been known to consume the honeydew from the Kanuka giant scale insect (Coelostomidia wairoensis).

=== Predators, parasites, and diseases ===
Parasitoids of the brown evening moth include Aleiodes sp. and Meteorus pulchricornis. As for predators of the brown evening moth, there seems to be some recorded predation from the kiore (Rattus exulans) on Tiritiri island.
