= Bush lawyer =

Bush lawyer may refer to the following:

- Bush lawyer (plant), one of several New Zealand climbing plants in the genus Rubus, especially Rubus cissoides
- (Australian and New Zealand usage) person not qualified in law who attempts to expound on legal matters. A rules lawyer.
- A poem by Banjo Paterson
- A mining agent in New Zealand (historical)
