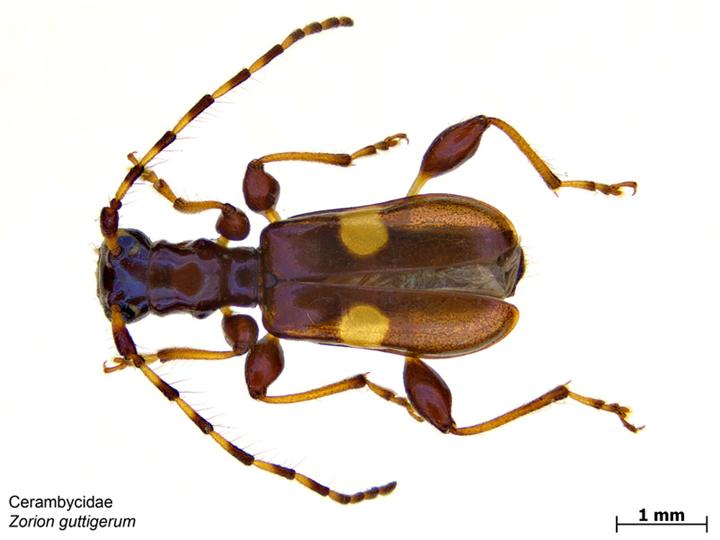
- Zorion guttigerum

Scientific classification
- Kingdom: Animalia
- Phylum: Arthropoda
- Class: Insecta
- Order: Coleoptera
- Suborder: Polyphaga
- Infraorder: Cucujiformia
- Family: Cerambycidae
- Tribe: Aphneopini
- Genus: Zorion; Pascoe, 1867

= Zorion =

Genus of beetles

Zorion is a genus of longhorn beetle of the family Cerambycidae that is endemic to New Zealand. Ten species are currently recognised.

== Distribution ==
Zorion is endemic to New Zealand and is widespread throughout the North and South Island. Some species are also found on offshore islands:

== Species ==
Commonly known as the flower longhorn beetle, it was first described by Pascoe in 1867 and belongs to the tribe Aphneopini. Listed below are the 10 recognised species:

- Zorion angustifasciatum Schnitzler, 2005
- Zorion australe Schnitzler, 2005
- Zorion batesi Sharp, 1875
- Zorion dugdalei Schnitzler, 2005
- Zorion guttigerum (Westwood, 1845)
- Zorion kaikouraiense Schnitzler, 2005
- Zorion minutum (Fabricius, 1775)
- Zorion nonmaculatum Schnitzler, 2005
- Zorion opacum Sharp, 1903
- Zorion taranakiense Schnitzler, 2005

== Habitat ==
They are often found in great numbers on flowers. Canopies and bushes are also common locations that Zorion often inhabit. Additionally, some species can also be found on flowering Chinese Privet (Ligustrum sinense) . Other examples include:

- Z. opacum were found to associate with blackberries on Chatham Islands.
- Z. minutum can be found on flowering shrubs during the last three months of a year. They have also been observed to forage on mangaeo (Litsea calicaris) and on carrot flowers.
- Z. guttigerum/Z. castum were observed in abundance on Dracophyllum flowers.

== Biology ==
=== Morphology ===
Adults are usually 3–7mm long, often colourful and striking. The species Z. guttigerum (blue with orange spots) has been considered New Zealand's most strikingly colourful beetle. Equally striking is Z. minutum, displaying an eye catching orange with yellow spots.

They have a tarsal formula of 5-5-5, although appearing as 4-4-4.

Species of the genus Zorion have a slim body shape and a smooth exterior, with a distinct waist separating its thorax from the elytra. Their heads are wider than their prothorax, with filliform antennae that are as long as their bodies (or longer), in both males and females. Eyes are usually small and emarginate, where the inner margin is concave or with a 'notch'. Pronotum is cylindrical and divided in three areas with a triangular scutellum. It has five segments on its abdomen that is covered by the elytra. The elytra is short in Zorion, with a pointed to rounded apex. The legs increase in length from anterior, and reaching the longest at its posterior.

Females in the genus Zorion are morphological similar, except for a less prominent head, antennae slightly shorter than its elytra, and a slightly wider waist.

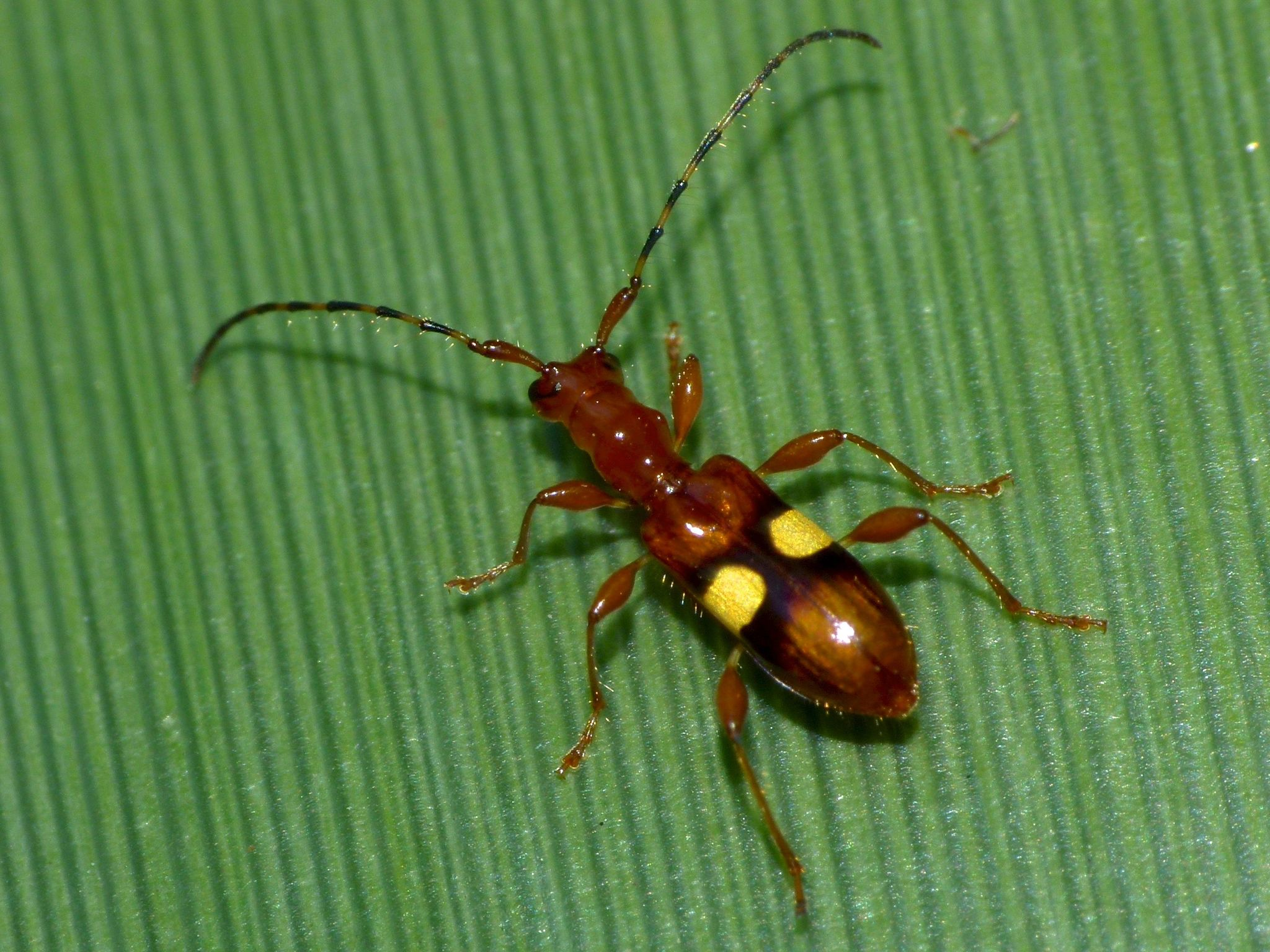
Z. australe

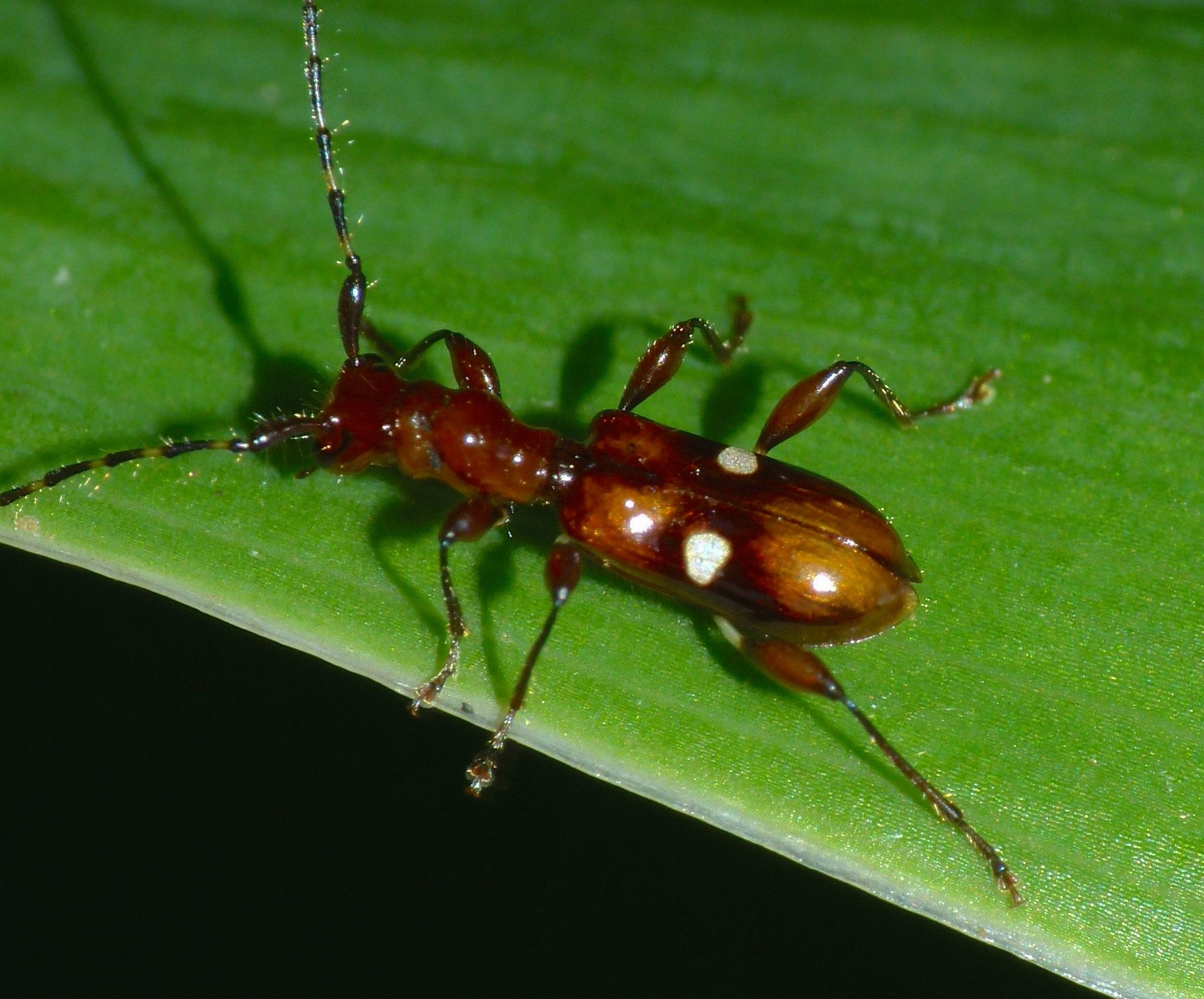
Z. batesi

=== Notable Defining Characteristics of Zorion Species ===
- Z. nonmaculatum – Elytra not unicoloured and without spots
- Z. batesi - Spots on elytra are small
- Z. taranakiensis - Spots on elytra are large and entire; spots are ivory coloured
- Z. guttigerum/Z. castum - Spot is golden coloured
- Z. minutum - Red-brown body with yellowish spots
- Z. australe - Orange/Yellow body, femur is the same colour as elytra and pronotum
- Z. kaikouraiensis - Orange/Purple body, femur is much lighter than pronotum
- Z. angustifasciatum - Femur has a dark ring
- Z. dugdalei - Glossy elytra
- Z. opacum - Dull elytra

== Life-cycle ==
Zorion species are known to utilise a wide range of exotic and native plants for the purpose of oviposition. Females of certain species have also been observed to oviposit in cut branches of Eucalyptus sp. Host plants for these species include freshly dead branches of both native and exotic plants.

Females lay their eggs in or on these host plants and the larvae hatches in approximately 6–25 days depending on species and temperature. As the larvae are wood-borers, they make tunnels that allow them to feed internally.

Similarly, the larval stage varies depending on environmental factors such as species, climate and temperature, however, the length of this stage is usually between 2 and 36 months, prior to pupation.

Pupating occurs in September with adults common towards November. Most pupate within a host plant, but there are some that do so within the soil instead. There is a tendency for the adult to remain – for a length of time – within the pupae after eclosion, and before emergence.

Since many Cerambycids do not hibernate, and can feed all year round, they can therefore overwinter at any stage in the life-cycle (excluding the egg stage).

== Behaviour ==
=== Diet ===
Zorion mainly feed on pollen from a variety of flowers. They also feed on foliage, bark and even live shoots prior to the beetle's sexual maturation. When feeding on flowers, they notably consume small flowers that are arranged into an inflorescence such as the Hebe (Scrophulariaceae) and Pomaderris (Rhamnacaea). Zorion species also have the habit of feeding between the bark and the sap wood. Feeding and mating are most prominent between October and March.

Their larvae are wood-borers and are known to feed internally on Corynocarpus laevigatus (Karaka) where they are sometimes laid in broken branches.

=== Pollination ===
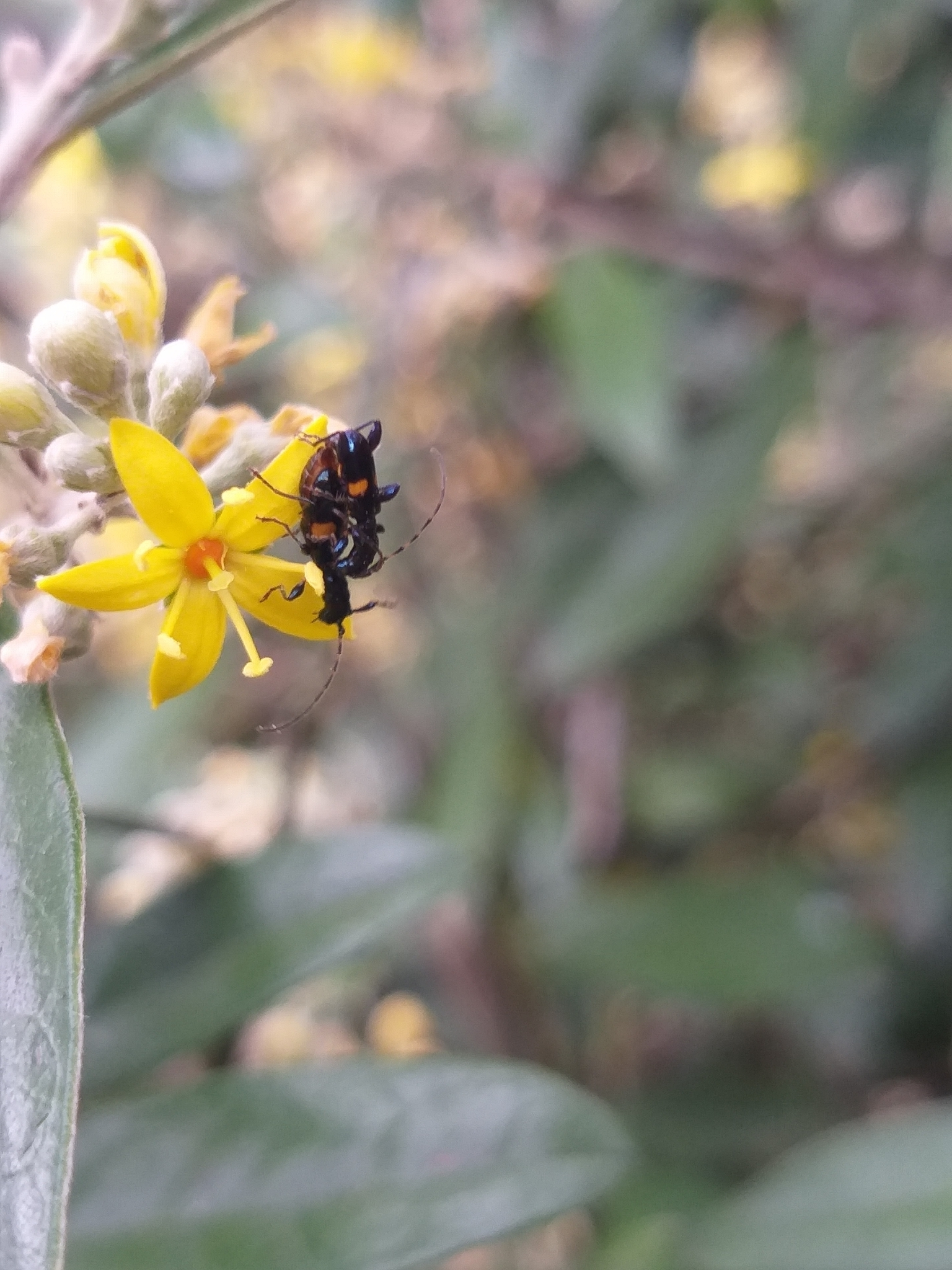
Z. guttigerum pair mating on flowers.

It has been suggested that their behaviour contributes to pollination in plants, where the wide visitation range encourages a lower degree of specialisation. Despite being wood-feeders and having their initial life-cycle within woody substrates, the adults often frequent flowering plants and shrubs for food. Zorion adults are commonly found in a wide range of environments ranging from canopies to shrubs, to dead wood to flowers. It could be suggested that the degree of specialisation in pollination might increase within a species, rather than as an entire genus, given the wide variety of plants and flowers Zorion frequents.

Their range of habitat and frequency to forage in and around flowering plants suggests that it is important to the pollination of New Zealand plants and trees. The plants and trees it frequents for oviposition and food, may also benefit from its presence when it comes to pollination. While adult feeding is insignificant to plants, visiting flowers certainly helps pollinations through feeding and other activities such as mating.

In the genus Zorion, these beetles consume pollen and have the unique characteristic of a specialised structure similar to that in corbiculate bees. It utilises a 'pollen basket', and is suggested to be an important pollinator for plants like the harakeke, amongst others. As an additional example, Z. minutum confines itself almost exclusively to flowers and notably helps pollinate the flowers of the Swamp Lawyer (Rubus australis). Relationships between insect pollinator and flower has evolved unique characteristics that facilitate effective pollination.
