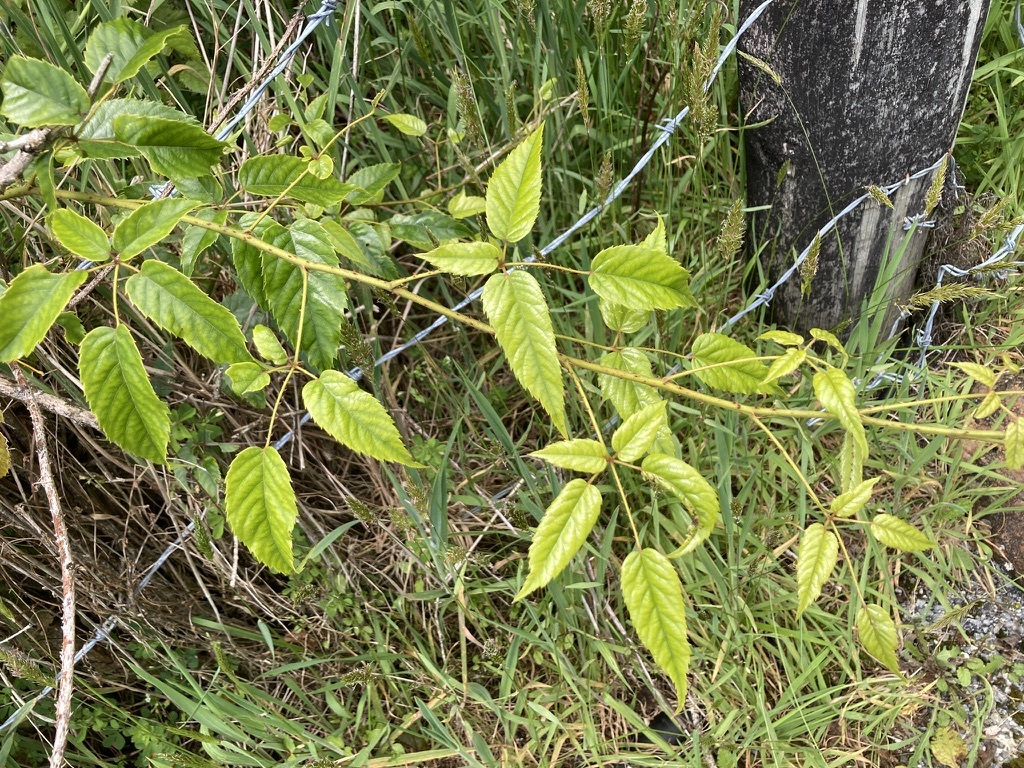
- Leaves and habit of Rubus cissoides

Conservation status
- Not Threatened (NZ TCS)

Scientific classification
- Kingdom: Plantae
- Clade: Tracheophytes
- Clade: Angiosperms
- Clade: Eudicots
- Clade: Rosids
- Order: Rosales
- Family: Rosaceae
- Genus: Rubus
- Subgenus: Rubus subg. Micranthobatus
- Species: R. cissoides

Binomial name
- Rubus cissoides A.Cunn.

= Rubus cissoides =

Species of flowering plant

Rubus cissoides, commonly called bush lawyer or tātarāmoa in te reo Māori, is a species of flowering plant in the family Rosaceae.

The species forms perennial scrambling vines with reddish prickles on the branches, compound leaves with 3-5 leaflets each up to 15 centimetres (6 in) long, white flowers from September to November and red berries from December to April.

Alan Cunningham described R. cissoides in 1839. The conservation status is Not Threatened. It is widespread on all three main islands of mainland New Zealand, and it has been used by Māori as food, medicines and construction materials.

== Description ==
Rubus cissoides plants are dioecious vines up to 10 metres (33 feet) long that scramble or climb on other vegetation. The young stems are covered in hooked reddish prickles, especially on the underside, while mature stems are without prickles, hairless, and up to 17 centimetres (3 inches) in diameter. The leaves are palmately or ternately compound, smooth and hairless, with up to 5 long and narrow leaflets (young plants) or 3–5 leaflets (mature plants). The petioles and petiolules have hooked prickles. Leaflets are variable in size and shape, 6–15 cm (2 1/4–6 in) long and up to 6 cm wide, lanceolate or oblong, sharply toothed on the edges, with a pointed tip.

The inflorescences are large and much-branched panicles of white flowers up to 20 cm long. The flowers have 5 sepals and 5 petals, and are either male (with numerous stamens, but with no style or only a rudimentary one) or female (with functional style, but with no stamens or only a few rudimentary stamens). The berries are around 1 cm in diameter, yellow to red, and made up of about 10–15 drupelets.

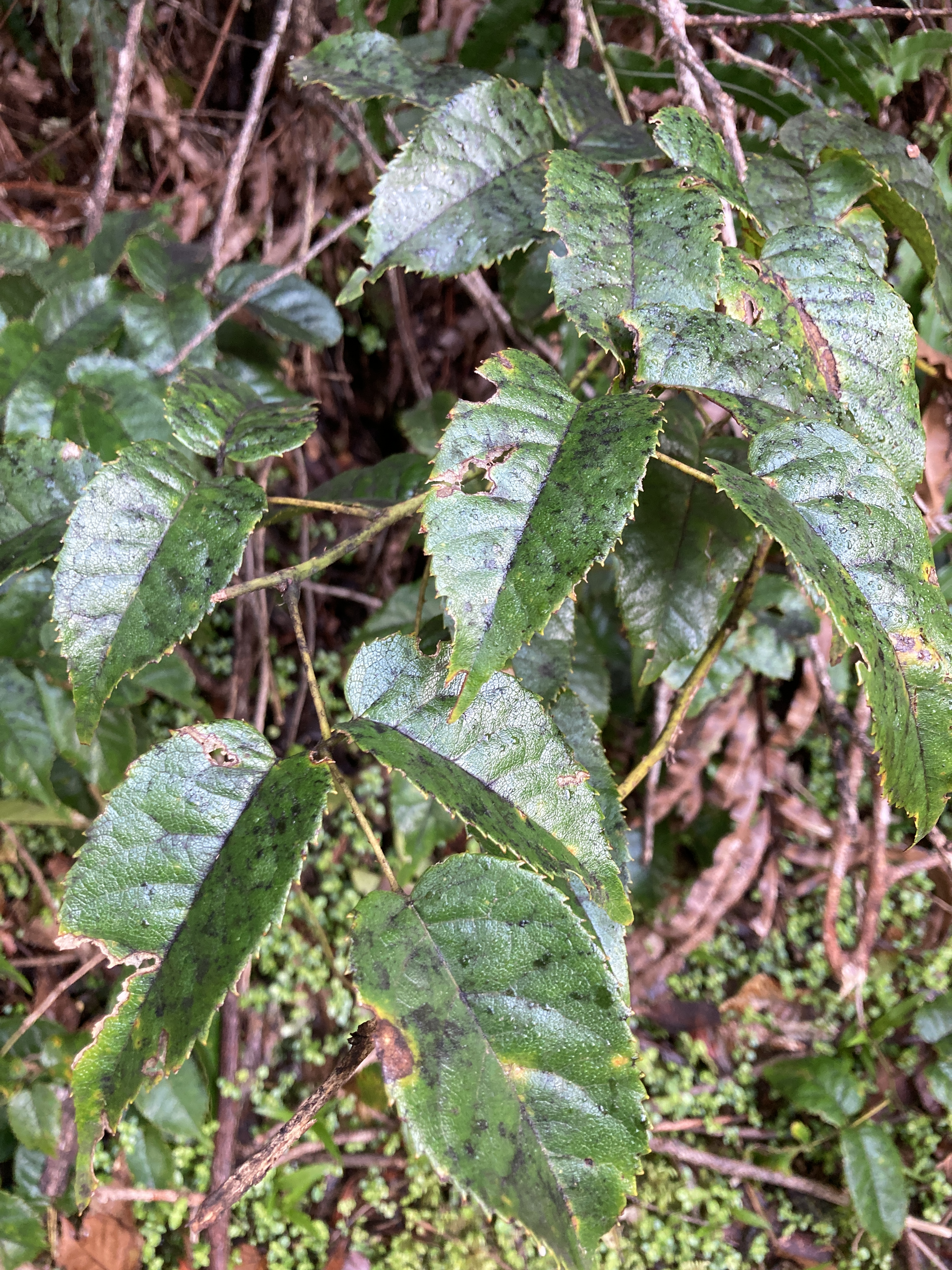
Leaves

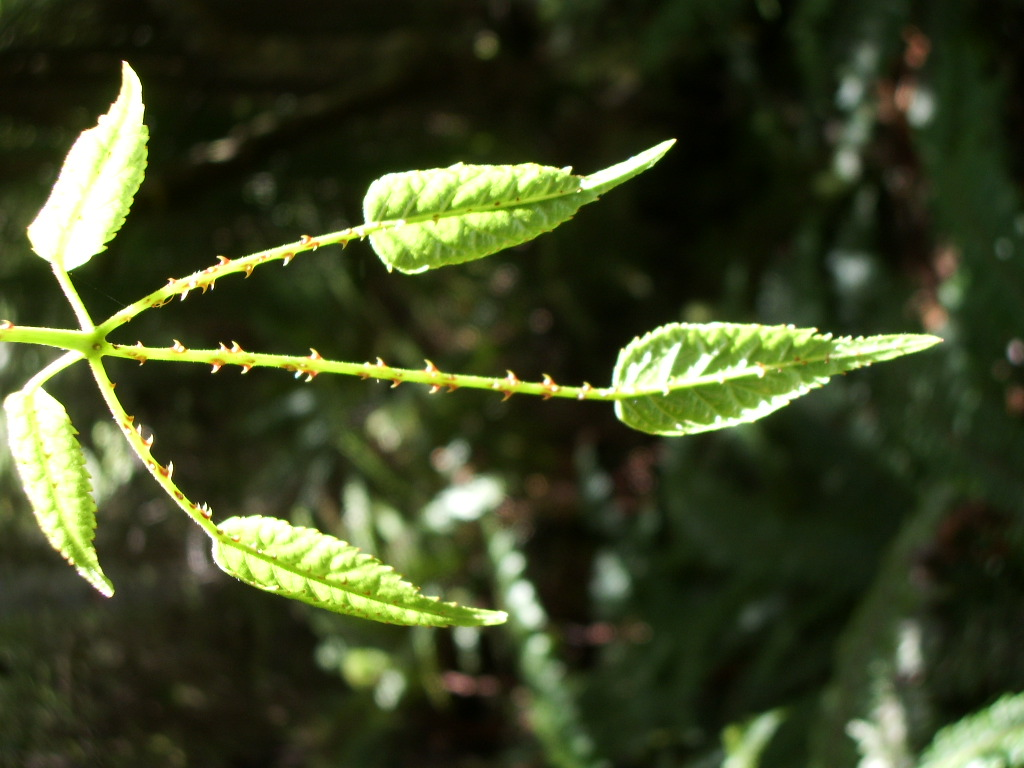
Leaflets close-up

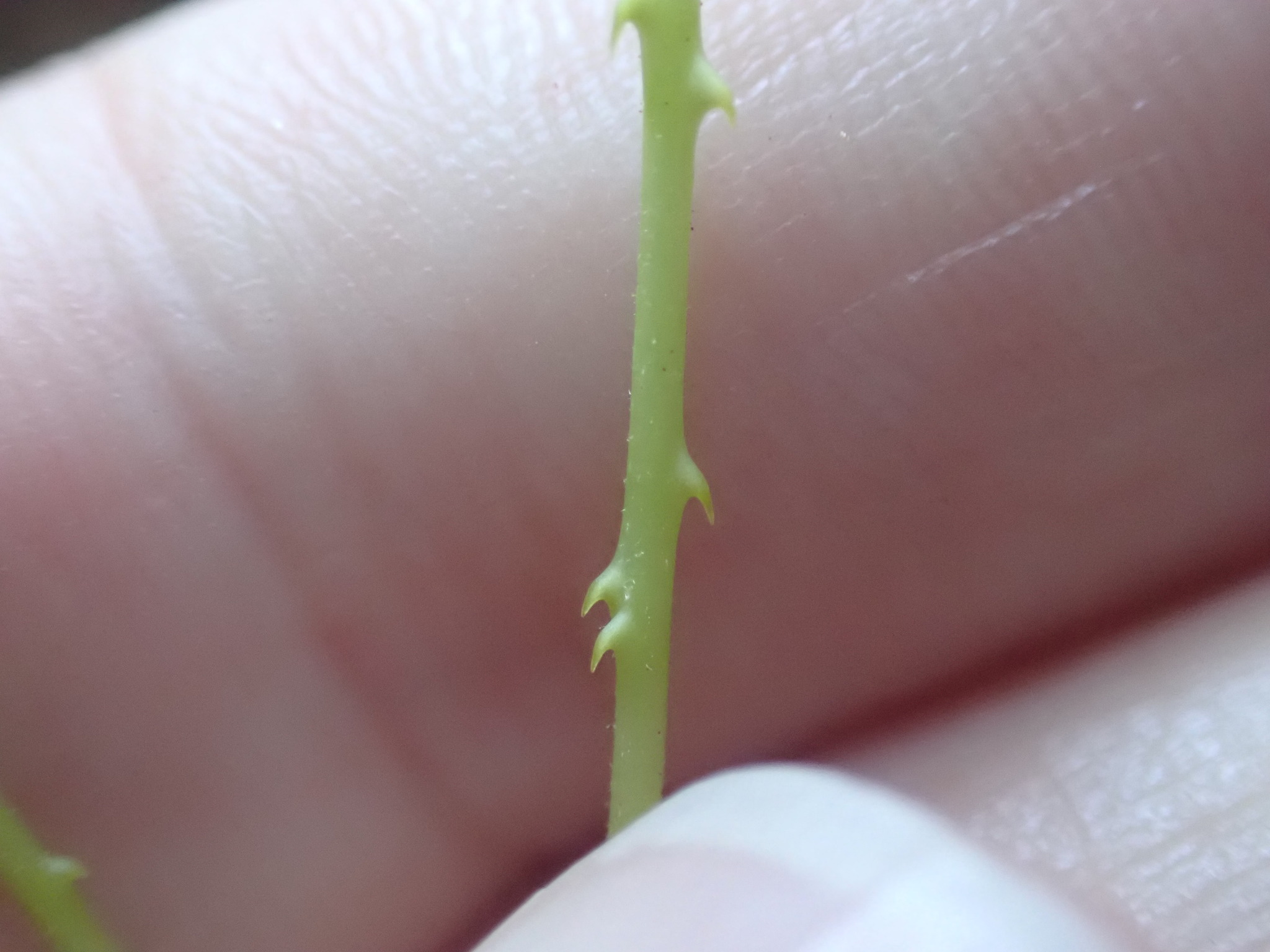
Prickles close-up

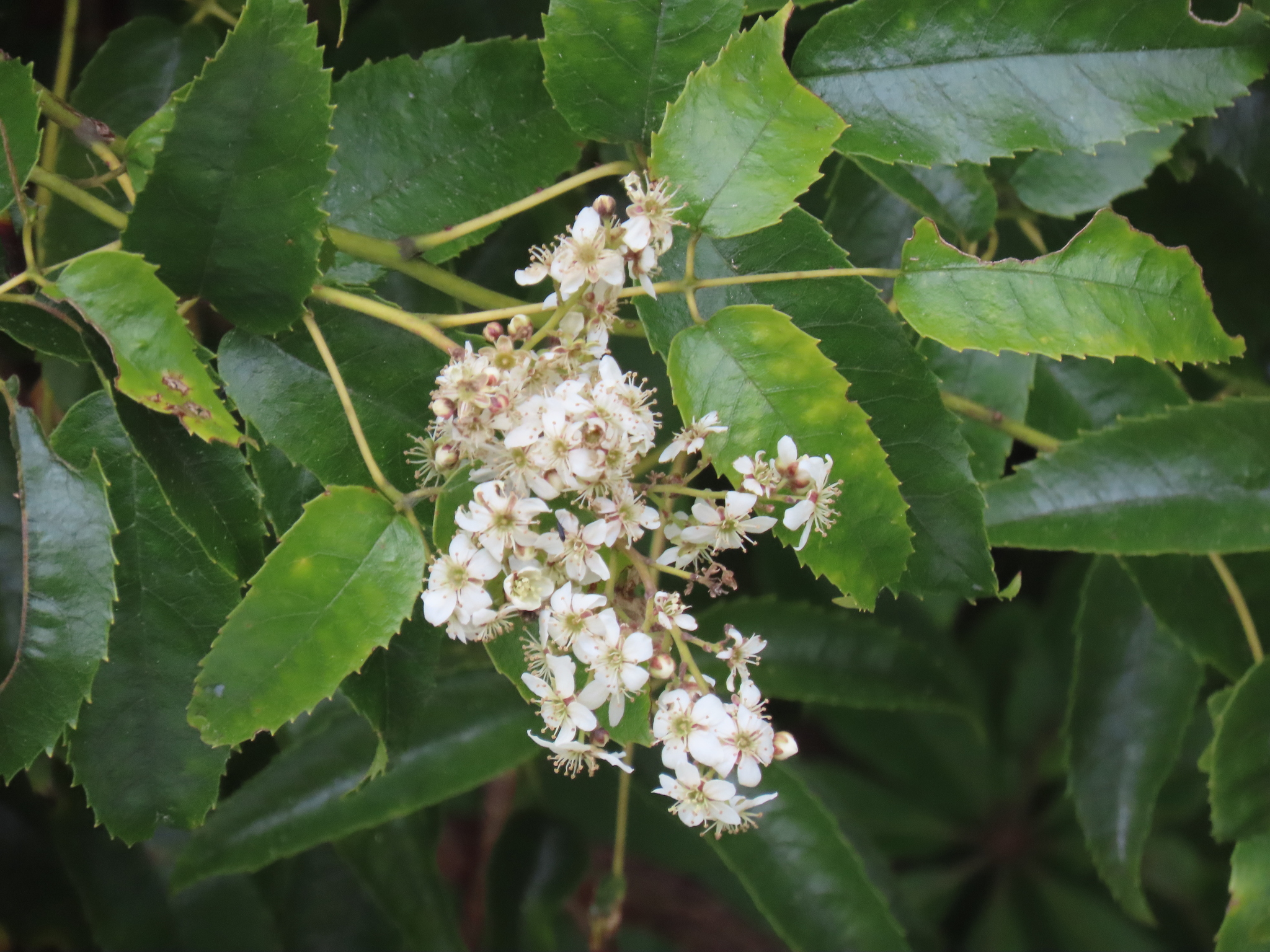
Leaflets and flowers

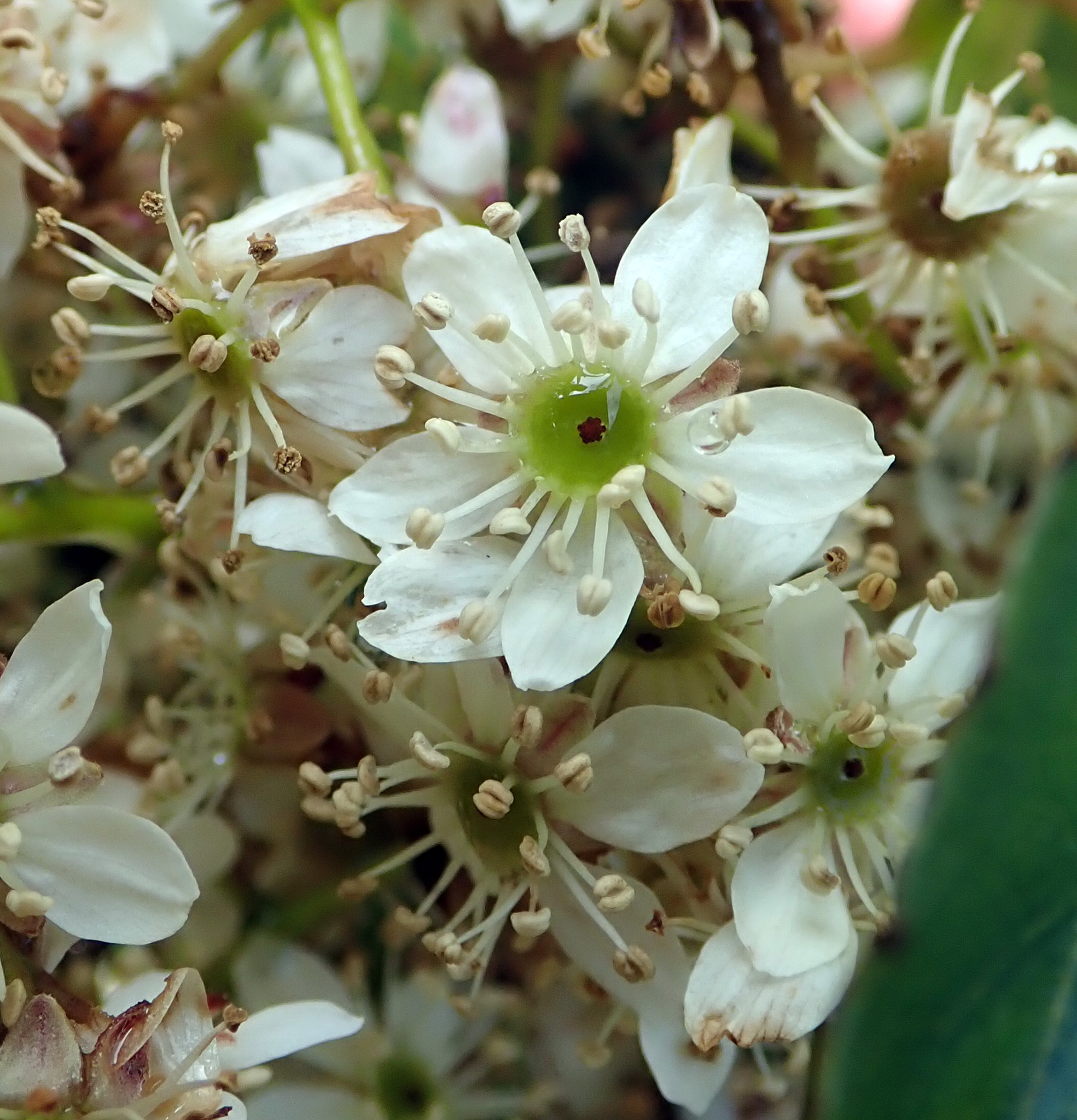
Close-up of white flowers

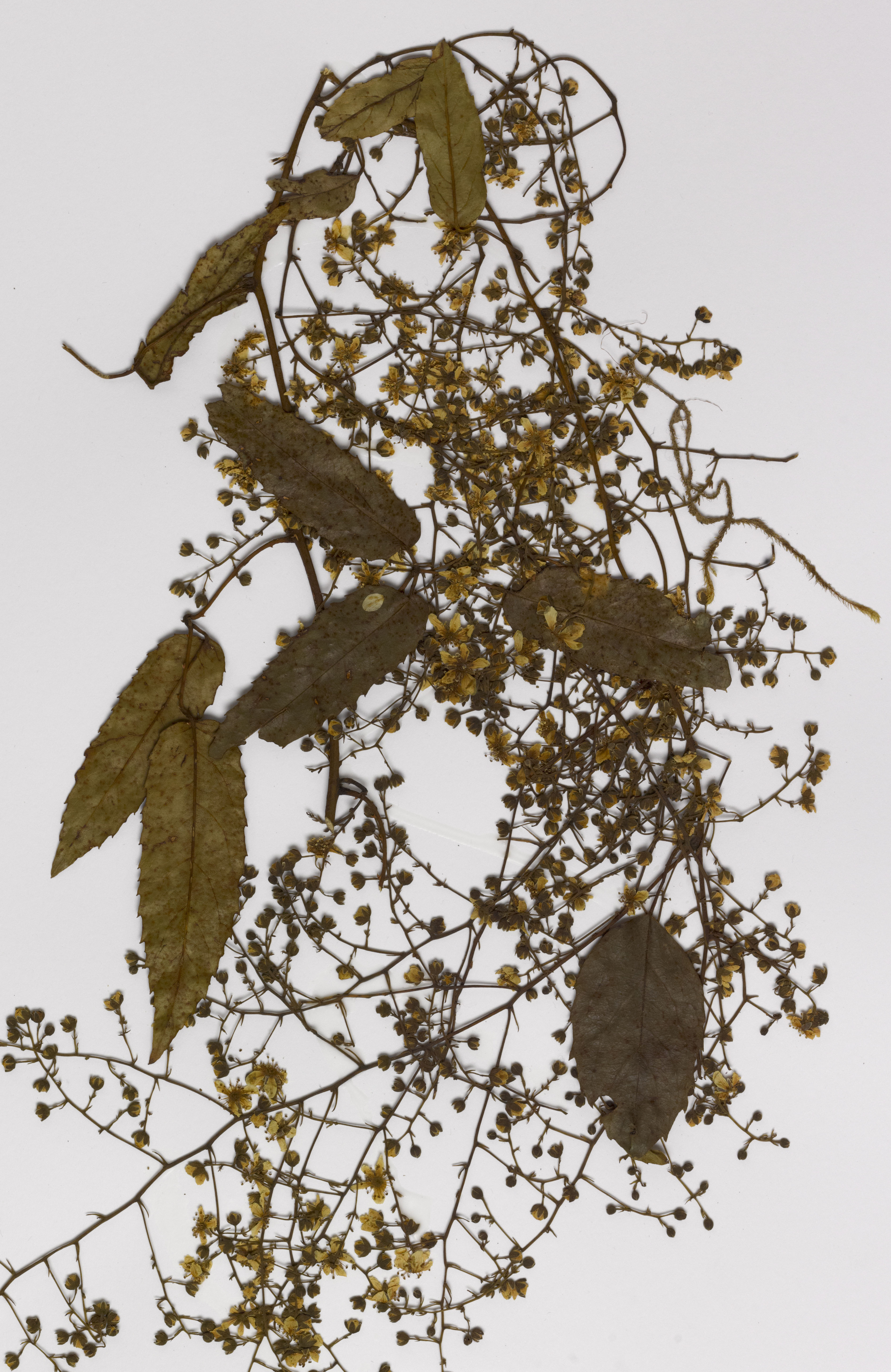
Dry foliage

=== Similar species ===
In addition to R. cissoides, there are four other endemic species of Rubus in New Zealand, including R. australis, R. parvus, R. schmideloides, and R. squarrosus. These can be distinguished from one another using prickle, leaf, inflorescence and fruit characteristics. Rubus cissoides is the most common native species in New Zealand, and has sharply toothed leaflets that are long and narrow.

== Taxonomy ==
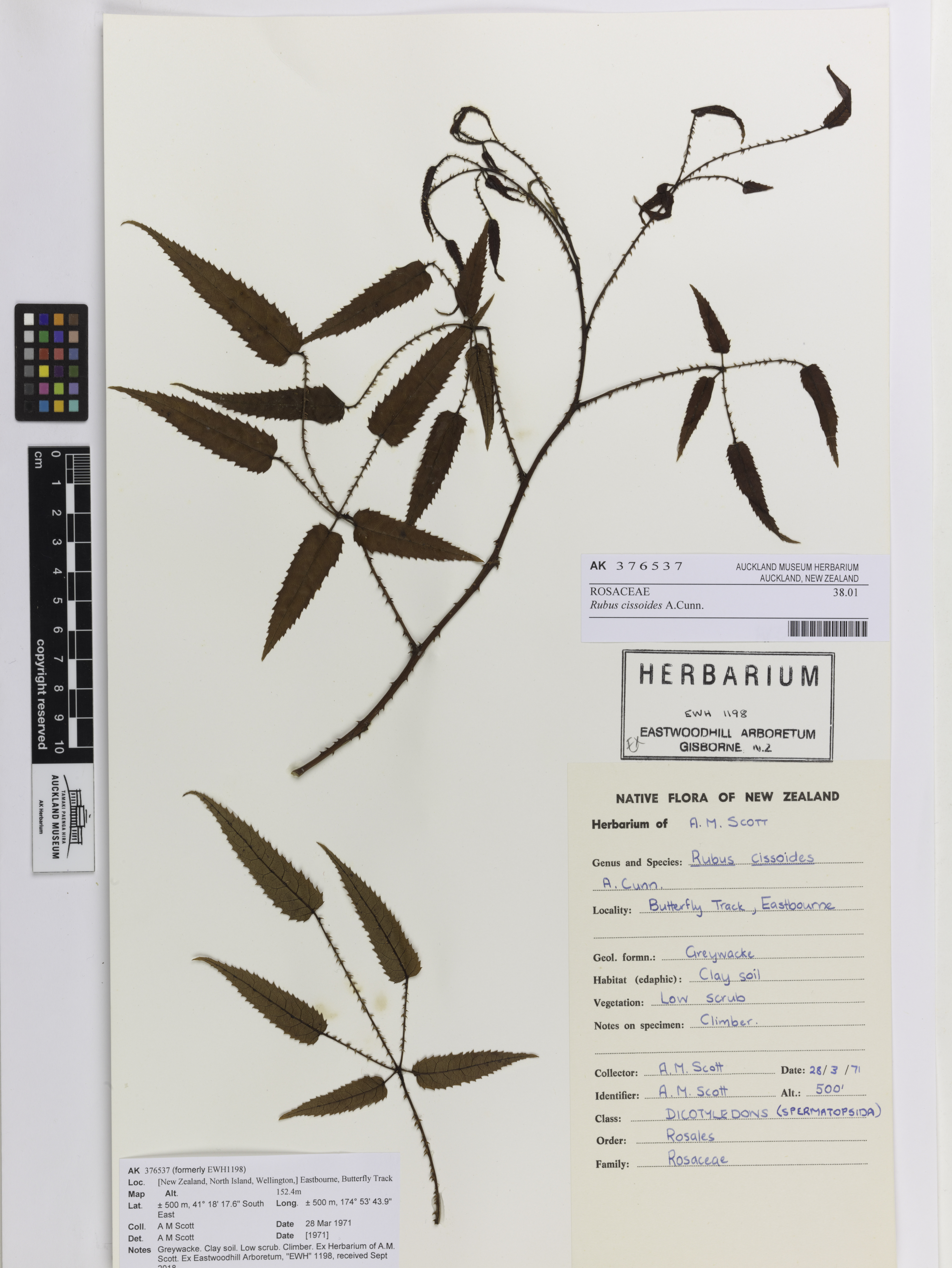
Herbarium specimen

Rubus cissoides A.Cunn. is in the family Rosaceae. The species was described in 1839 by Alan Cunningham, based on the type specimen collected in 1826 by Cunningham from "dense forests of Whangaroa". The type specimen is lodged at Kew Herbarium (K000762091). The epithet cissoides means "ivy like" and is derived from the Greek words kissos (ivy, Cissus) and -oides (likeness). Rubus cissoides is the same genus, Rubus, as the blackberry and raspberry.

Many of the native New Zealand Rubus species, including R. cissoides, are commonly called bush lawyer or tātarāmoa in te reo Māori, and other vernacular names for this and other similar Rubus species in New Zealand include taramoa, akatātarāmoa, taraheke, and tātaraheke. They are considered to be "hook climbers", and are woody, low to high climbing vines or lianes that have backwardly curving hooked prickles, which allow the plant to grip, climb up and find support on shrubs or other vegetation.

== Distribution and habitat ==
Rubus cissoides is endemic to and widespread in New Zealand, and occurs on all three of the main islands: North Island, South Island and Stewart Island. It is found in lowland and montane habitats, often in forests, but also in scrub and wetland margins, often in moist, sunny environments.

== Conservation status ==
Rubus cissoides is considered to be Not Threatened in the most recent assessment (2017–2018) under the New Zealand Threat Classification System system for plants.

== Ecology ==
=== Life cycle and phenology ===
In a seed germination experiment, 82% of R. cissoides seeds germinated, with some germinating in spring, remaining seeds germinating at a slow, steady rate over two years.

Young plants spread over the forest floor until finding an appropriate shrub or vegetation for support. They can support themselves up to a height of about 60cm before requiring support in the form of other vegetation.

R. cissoides is insect-pollinated, and it flowers from September to November and fruits from December to April.

=== Herbivory and diseases ===
The non-native herbivores, deer and possums, eat small amounts of the foliage or leaf litter of R. cissoides, and possums have been known to eat the berries and flowers of R. cissoides.

The blackberry rust fungus Phragmidium violaceum, appears as black patches on the leaves and can cause mild infections in R. cissoides.

== Uses ==
Rubus cissoides and other native New Zealand Rubus species were used by Māori and continue to have multiple uses, including as food, construction materials, or medicines. The fruits are eaten by birds and people, the branches can be used for making traps, and the crushed berries form a dye which is blue or purple in colour. Some of the ways Māori used Rubus plants medicinally include using the bark of the stem to treat abdominal pains, using root bark to treat diarrhea, and preparing crushed leaves to relieve chest congestions and colds.
