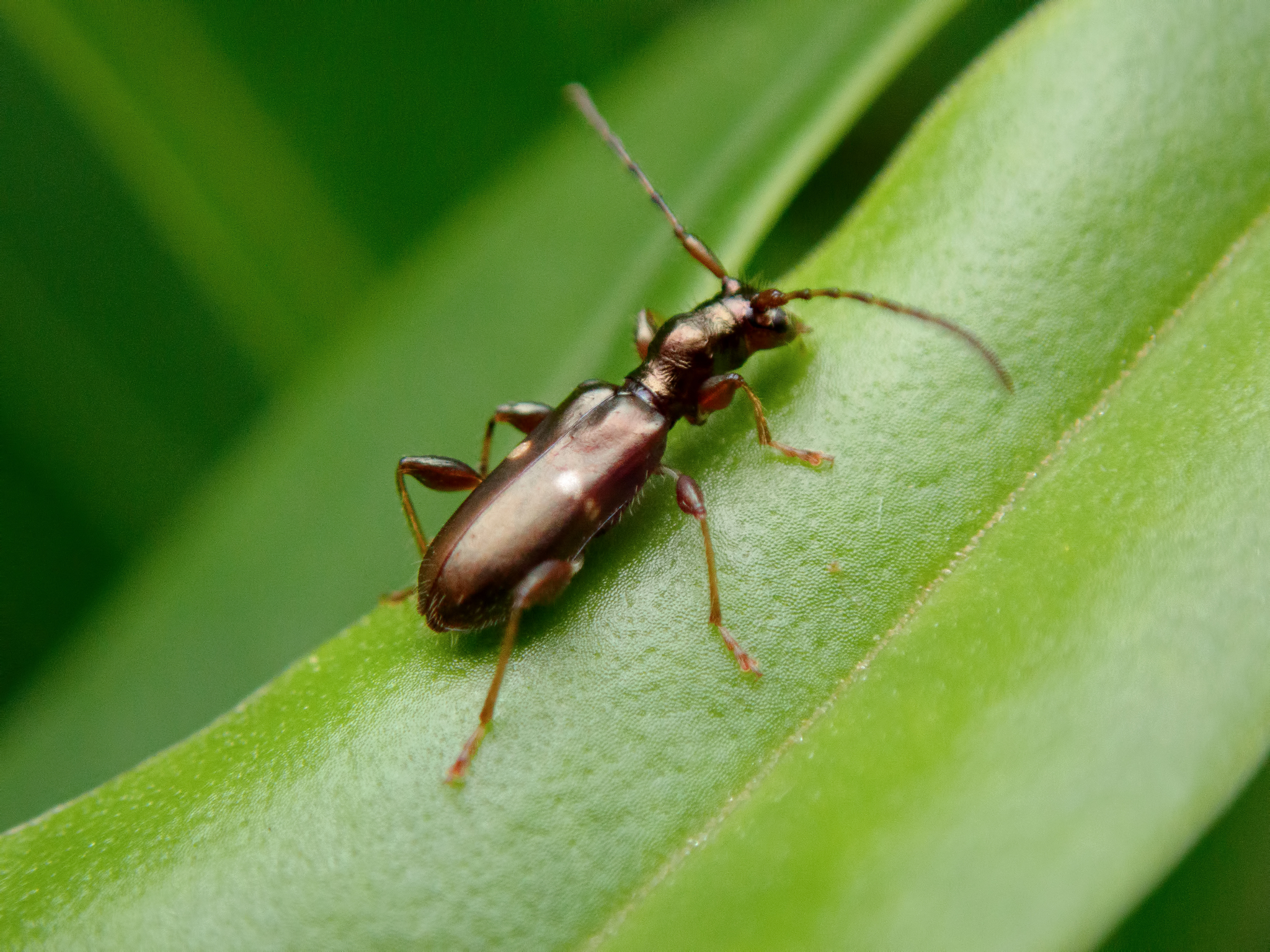

Conservation status
- Naturally Uncommon (NZ TCS)

Scientific classification
- Kingdom: Animalia
- Phylum: Arthropoda
- Class: Insecta
- Order: Coleoptera
- Suborder: Polyphaga
- Infraorder: Cucujiformia
- Family: Cerambycidae
- Genus: Zorion
- Species: Z. opacum

Binomial name
- Zorion opacum Sharp, 1903

= Zorion opacum =

Species of beetle

Zorion opacum is a species of longhorn beetle restricted to the Chatham Islands of New Zealand. They were first formally described in 1903 by David Sharp. They are distinguished from other Zorion by their silky dull appearance. Adults occur from early November to early March, the warmer months in the southern hemisphere. The adults feed on pollen whereas the larvae feed on bark and trunks of plants such as Veronica barkeri. Under the New Zealand Threat Classification System, they are listed as "Naturally Uncommon" due to their small distribution.

== Taxonomy ==
This species was first described in taxonomic literature in 1903 by David Sharp from three specimens collected by Hugo Schauinsland. Sharp examined a specimen supposedly collected from Otago, but thought this locality might be an error. In an 1898 paper, Frederick Hutton reported the occurrence of Zorion minitum in the Chatham Islands, but this was probably the first record of Z. opacum. The genus was most recently revised in 2005, during which it was given an updated description. The lectotype (a specimen chosen to serve as the type specimen when the original describer did not assign one) is stored in the Natural History Museum, London.

Z. opacum are members of the genus Zorion, which is composed of ten species, all of which are restricted to New Zealand. They are members of the tribe Aphneopini, which are broadly referred to as "flower longhorn beetles".

== Description ==
As adults, the males are 3.18–6.96 mm in length whereas the females are 3.78–7.12 mm. The texture of the head, prothorax (first part of the thorax) and the elytra (hardened plates that cover the abdomen) have a silky dull appearance. This feature distinguishes it from the other known Zorion species which all have a glossy texture on at least the elytra. The base colour of the body is golden-brown, with the head and upper surface of the prothorax being dark brown. As in all Zorion, the antennae have eleven segments. The first two segments are golden-brown (occasionally dark brown), whereas segments three to seven (or sometimes three to eight) are partly pale brown before transitioning to dark brown. The remaining segments are all dark or pale brown. At their base, the elytra are dark brown before transitioning to light brown further down, with a pair of small pale spots on them that vary in size or may even be absent. The tip of the elytra are also rounded. The females also have hairs on a fold at the sides of the elytra, whereas these hairs are usually absent in males.

== Distribution and habitat ==
They are endemic, or restricted to, the Chatham Islands in New Zealand. They have been found on Chatham Island and Pitt Island, as well as some of the smaller surrounding islands. They are associated with forest, shrub, bush and broadleaf habitat. They have been found on several native plant species such as Coprosma, Muehlenbeckia australis and Plagianthus regius. They have also been recorded on blackberry.

== Life history ==
Adults have been recorded between early November and early March (warmer months). Rearing records of collected larvae have reported females taking 216–245 days to mature whereas male took 216–245 days. Like other Zorion, the adults feed on pollen whereas the larvae are known to feed on the bark and trunks of plants. The larvae have been successful reared to maturity from plants endemic to the Chatham Islands such as Veronica barkeri, Myrsine chathamica, Myrsine coxii and Plagianthus.

== Conservation status ==
Under the New Zealand Threat Classification System, this species is listed as "Naturally Uncommon" with the qualifiers of "Range Restricted" and "Island Endemic". This is due to the species only occurring on the Chatham Islands.
