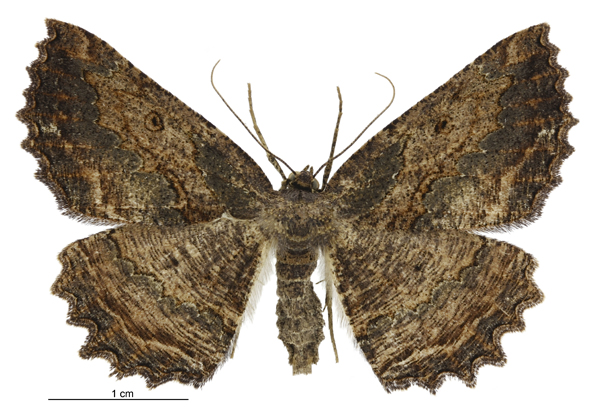

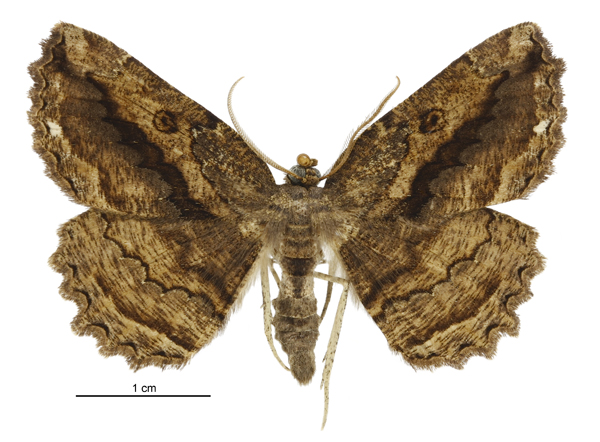
- Female (top) and male (bottom)

Scientific classification
- Kingdom: Animalia
- Phylum: Arthropoda
- Class: Insecta
- Order: Lepidoptera
- Family: Geometridae
- Genus: Gellonia
- Species: G. pannularia

Binomial name
- Gellonia pannularia (Guenée, 1868)

Synonyms
- Gnophos pannularia Guenée, 1868; Eunoumeana pannularia (Guenée, 1868)

= Gellonia pannularia =

Species of moth

Gellonia pannularia, the lesser brown evening moth, is a species of moth in the family Geometridae. The species was first described by Achille Guenée in 1868. It is endemic to New Zealand.
