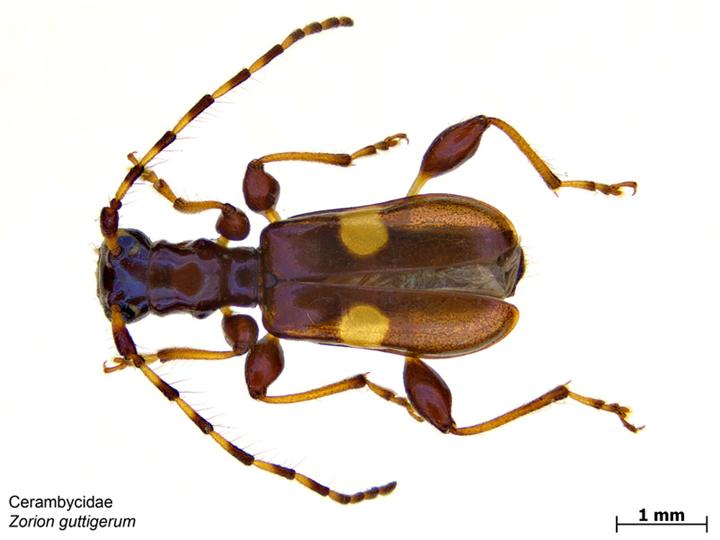

Scientific classification
- Kingdom: Animalia
- Phylum: Arthropoda
- Class: Insecta
- Order: Coleoptera
- Suborder: Polyphaga
- Infraorder: Cucujiformia
- Family: Cerambycidae
- Genus: Zorion
- Species: Z. guttigerum

Binomial name
- Zorion guttigerum (Westwood, 1845)
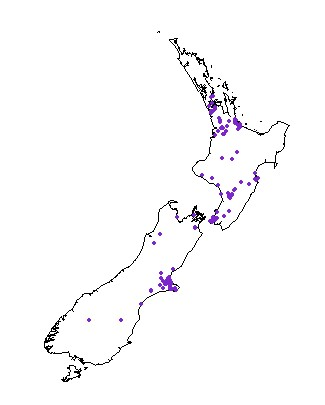
- Distribution of Zorion guttigerum in New Zealand using research grade iNaturalist data (5 October 2021)

= Zorion guttigerum =

Species of insect

Zorion guttigerum, commonly known as the Flower longhorn beetle, is an endemic species of beetle in New Zealand. It is found on the flowers of many plant species and feeds on nectar and pollen.

== Taxonomy ==
Zorion guttigerum was first described as Obrium guttigerum by John Westwood in 1845, and was later reassigned to genus Zorion.

Zorion currently includes 10 extant species, all of which are endemic to New Zealand. They belong to the family of longhorn beetles (Cerambycidae), of which there are approximately 180 known endemic species. In New Zealand, long-horn beetles are important pollinators for native plants, including harakeke (common flax).

== Distribution ==
Zorion guttigerum is widespread throughout the North Island and South Island.

== Species description ==
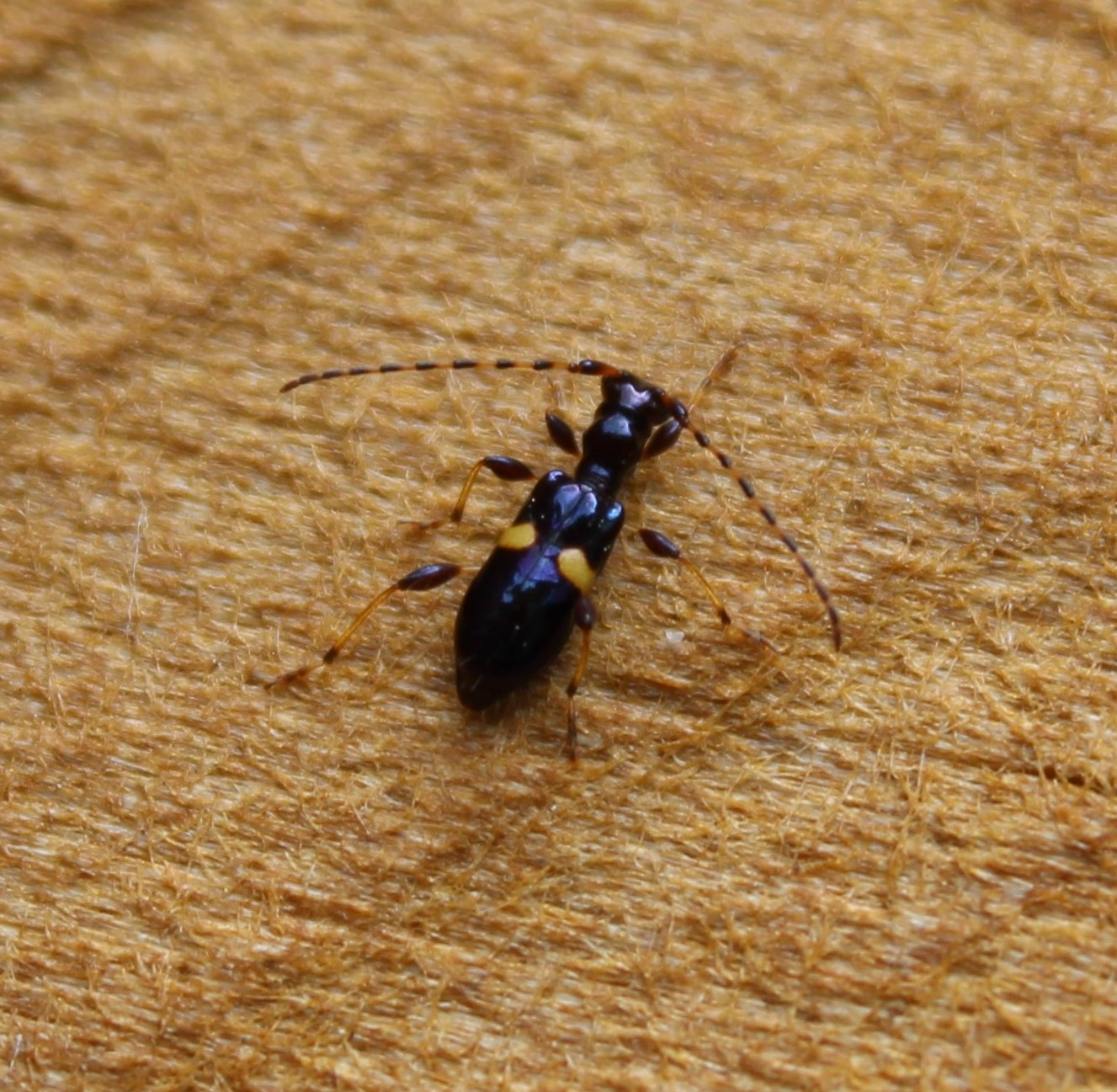
Zorion guttigerum

Adults are variable in size and can range from 3–7 mm in length. They are a dark purple brown colour with a bright golden spot on each elytron. They have been described as the most strikingly colourful beetle within New Zealand fauna. Unlike most Cerambycinae species, where the antennae are elongate and extend past the body, Z. guttigerum have antennae generally shorter than their body. Males tend to have longer antennae than females, although females are significantly larger in size.

Zorion guttigerum are diurnal beetles. They are good flyers and often fly between flower clusters. Adults mate and feed on the flowers of the many plant species they visit. Males may exhibit aggressive behaviour towards other males on the same flower cluster, even in the absence of females. After mating, females leave the flowers to lay eggs, while males remain on the flowers. Feeding and mating occur on flowers of many plant species usually between October and March. It has been found that the body colour of this species plays an important role in mating success in both males and females.

Females lay eggs in freshly cut and broken branches of both native and exotic plants. Larvae feed internally on the bark and woody materials.

== Plant visitation ==
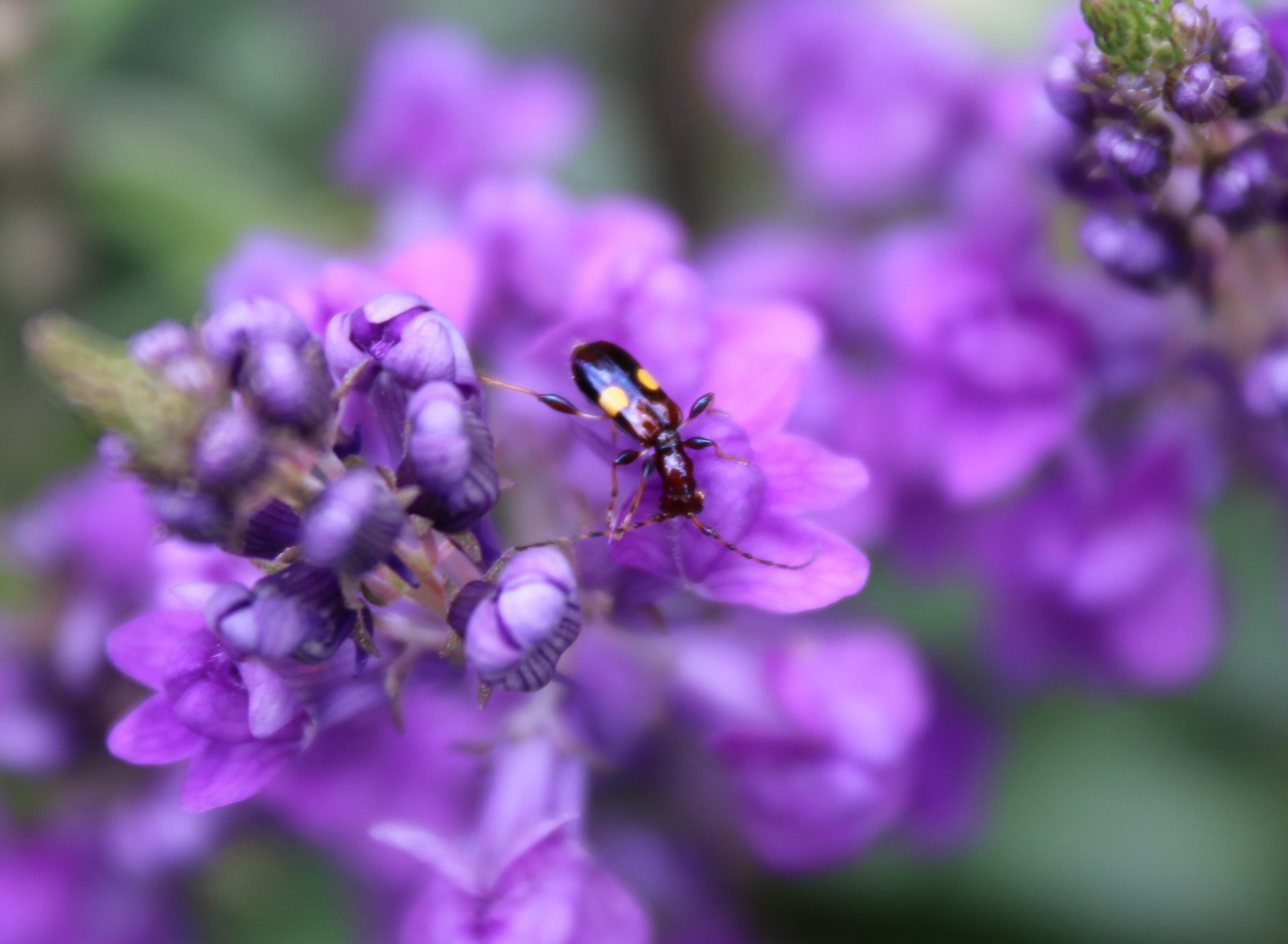
Zorion guttigerum visiting Linaria purpurea (purple toadflax)

Zorion guttigerum are often found in great numbers near flowers and they may be important pollinators for many New Zealand native plants. They are a very generalist species and are known to visit a wide variety of plants. The species listed below are few selected examples of the plants visited by this beetle.

=== Native flowers ===
Zorion guttigerum is known to visit the flowers of many native and endemic species. Some host species include: Discaria toumatou (matagouri), Phormium tenax (harakeke), Schefflera digitata (patē), Pennantia corymbose (kaikōmako). They also visit the flowers of two beech species, Nothofagus menziesii (silver beech) and Nothofagus fusca (red beech).

=== Exotic flowers ===
Zorion guttigerum also visits flowers of exotic plant species, some of which include: Physocarpus opulifolius (ninebark), Lagunaria patersonia (Norfolk Island hibiscus), Roldana petasitis (velvet groundsel), and some Acacia species.

=== Other plants ===
Aside from flowers, Z. guttigerum have been found on the foliage and branches of some plants including: Pseudowintera colorata (pepperwood), Chamaecytisus palmensis (tree lucerne), Sophora microphylla (kōwhai), Galium palustae (marsh bedstraw), and Olearia virgata (twiggy tree daisy).

Adults also visit orchards around New Zealand. Although the recorded orchards in New Zealand are dominated by honeybees as flower visitors, Z. guttigerum was often a commonly reported flower visitor in kiwifruit (Actinidia chinensis var. deliciosa) and avocado (Persea americana) orchards.
