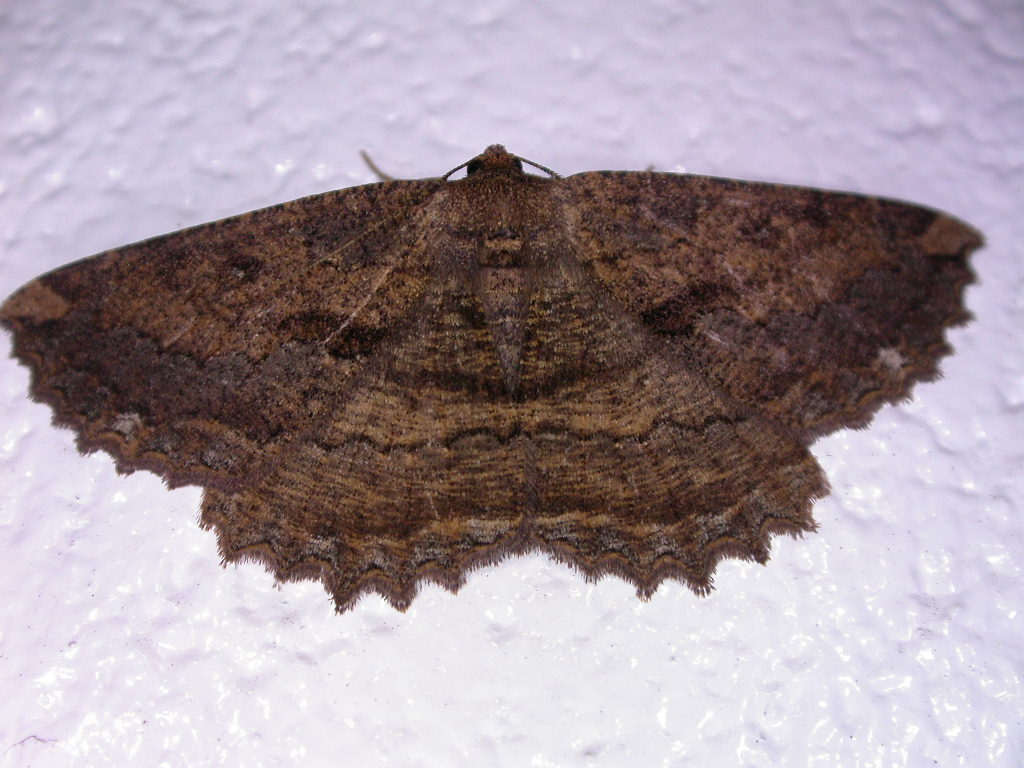
- Gellonia dejectaria

Scientific classification
- Kingdom: Animalia
- Phylum: Arthropoda
- Class: Insecta
- Order: Lepidoptera
- Family: Geometridae
- Genus: Gellonia; Meyrick, 1884

= Gellonia =

Genus of moths

Gellonia is a genus of moths in the family Geometridae erected by Edward Meyrick in 1884.

== Species ==
- Gellonia dejectaria Walker, 1860
- Gellonia pannularia Guenée, 1868
