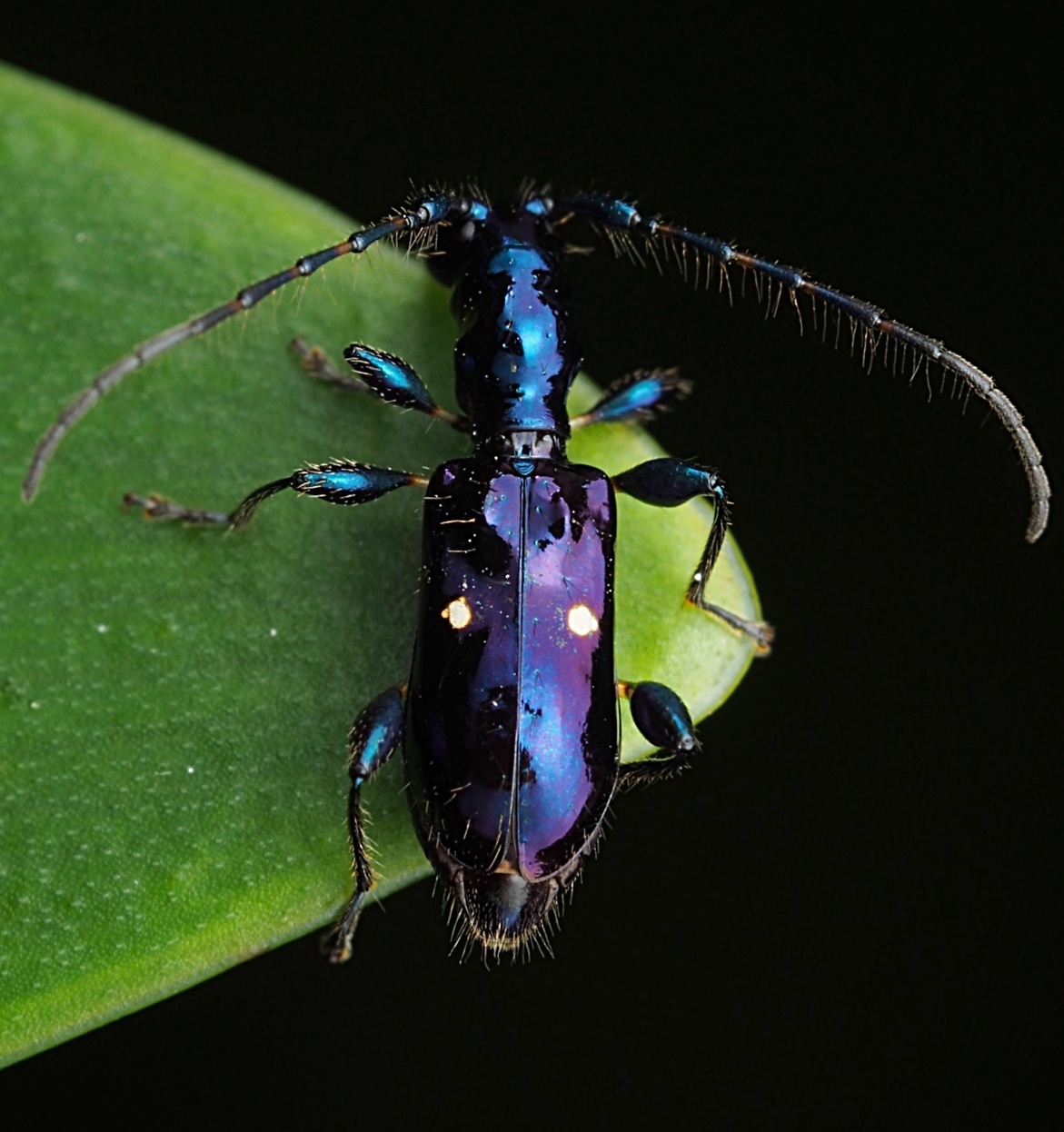

Scientific classification
- Kingdom: Animalia
- Phylum: Arthropoda
- Class: Insecta
- Order: Coleoptera
- Suborder: Polyphaga
- Infraorder: Cucujiformia
- Family: Cerambycidae
- Genus: Zorion
- Species: Z. batesi

Binomial name
- Zorion batesi Sharp, 1875

= Zorion batesi =

Species of beetle

Zorion batesi are a species of longhorn beetle endemic to New Zealand.
