= Zorion angustifasciatum =

Scientific classification
- Kingdom: Animalia
- Phylum: Arthropoda
- Clade: Pancrustacea
- Class: Insecta
- Order: Coleoptera
- Suborder: Polyphaga
- Infraorder: Cucujiformia
- Family: Cerambycidae
- Genus: Zorion
- Species: Z. angustifasciatum

Binomial name
- Zorion angustifasciatum Schnitzler, 2005

Species of beetle

Zorion angustifasciatum is a species of longhorn beetle in the genus Zorion. It was first described by Franz-Rudolf Schnitzler in 2005. This species is endemic to New Zealand and only found on Three Kings Island.
