= Aphneopini =

Scientific classification
- Kingdom: Animalia
- Phylum: Arthropoda
- Clade: Pancrustacea
- Class: Insecta
- Order: Coleoptera
- Suborder: Polyphaga
- Infraorder: Cucujiformia
- Family: Cerambycidae
- Subfamily: Cerambycinae
- Tribe: Aphneopini; Aurivillius, 1912

Tribe of insects

Aphneopini is a tribe of long-horned beetles in the subfamily Cerambycinae. It contains 6 genera with 21 species.

== Genera ==
- Aphneope Pascoe, 1863
- Calaphneope Vives et al., 2011
- Caledorion Vives & Sudre. 2015
- Spiniphra Hayashi, 1961
- Zoedia Pascoe, 1862
- Zorion Pascoe, 1867
