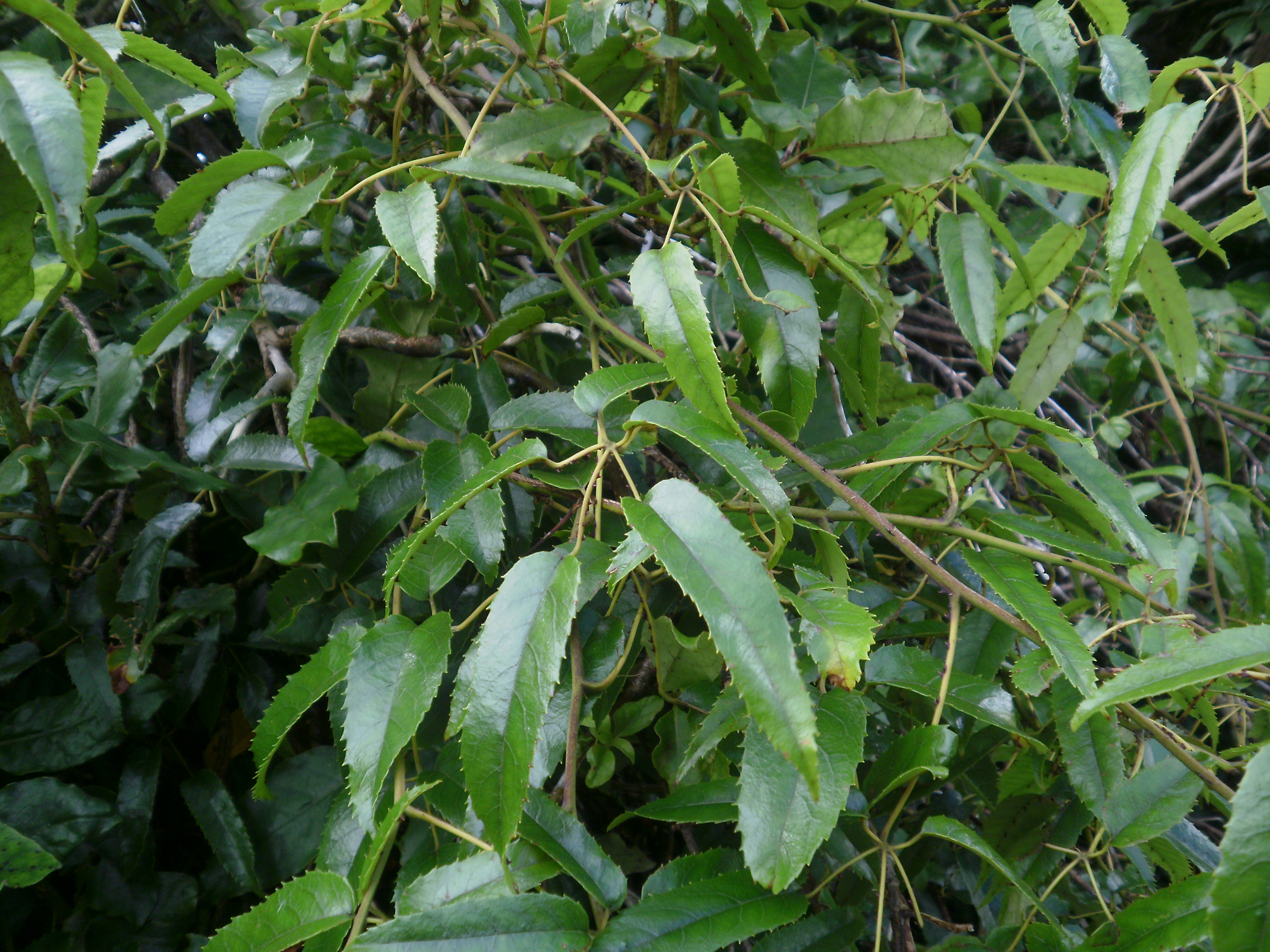
- Rubus cissoides

Scientific classification
- Kingdom: Plantae
- Clade: Embryophytes
- Clade: Tracheophytes
- Clade: Spermatophytes
- Clade: Angiosperms
- Clade: Eudicots
- Clade: Rosids
- Order: Rosales
- Family: Rosaceae
- Genus: Rubus
- Subgenus: Rubus subg. Micranthobatus

Species
- Rubus australis; Rubus cissoides; Rubus parvus; Rubus schmidelioides; Rubus squarrosus

= Bush lawyer (plant) =

Common name for a group of blackberry plants

Bush lawyer is a common name of a group of climbing blackberry plants (subgenus Micranthobatus of the genus Rubus) that are found in New Zealand, many of them rampant forest vines. There are five native species of bush lawyer in New Zealand, all endemic:

Image	Name	Distribution
	Rubus australis G.Forst. 1786	New Zealand
	Rubus cissoides A.Cunn. 1839	New Zealand
	Rubus parvus Buchanan 1873 publ. 1874	New Zealand
	Rubus schmidelioides A.Cunn. 1839	New Zealand
	Rubus squarrosus Fritsch 1886	
	Rubus moorei F.Muell. 1858	Australia

The Māori language name of the plant is tātarāmoa.

Tātaramoa, or “bush lawyer”, has hooked thorns that snag clothing and rip or prick the skin.

The colloquial English name is often said to have been given because once this thorny plant becomes attached to you it will not let you go until it has drawn blood:

Some overseas trampers might not understand or appreciate the common name of Rubus cissoides, but North Americans certainly do. In New Zealand the thorny vine is best known as bush lawyer. Found throughout the country up to 1000m, the plant has hand-shaped leaves with three to five toothed 'fingers', white flowers and a yellowish-red fruit. The berry is shaped like a small blackberry and was once used by early Europeans to make jams and jellies. But the plant's most noticeable feature is its thorns.

The backward-pointing prickles on the stems help the vine climb to the open canopy of a forest but also snare unwary trampers who stray from the track. You'll immediately know bush lawyer when you encounter it as the thorns will painfully scrape across your bare thighs or arms, quickly drawing blood. And, like any good American lawyer, once it gets a hold of you, it doesn't let go easily.

== See also ==
- Wait-a-minute tree
