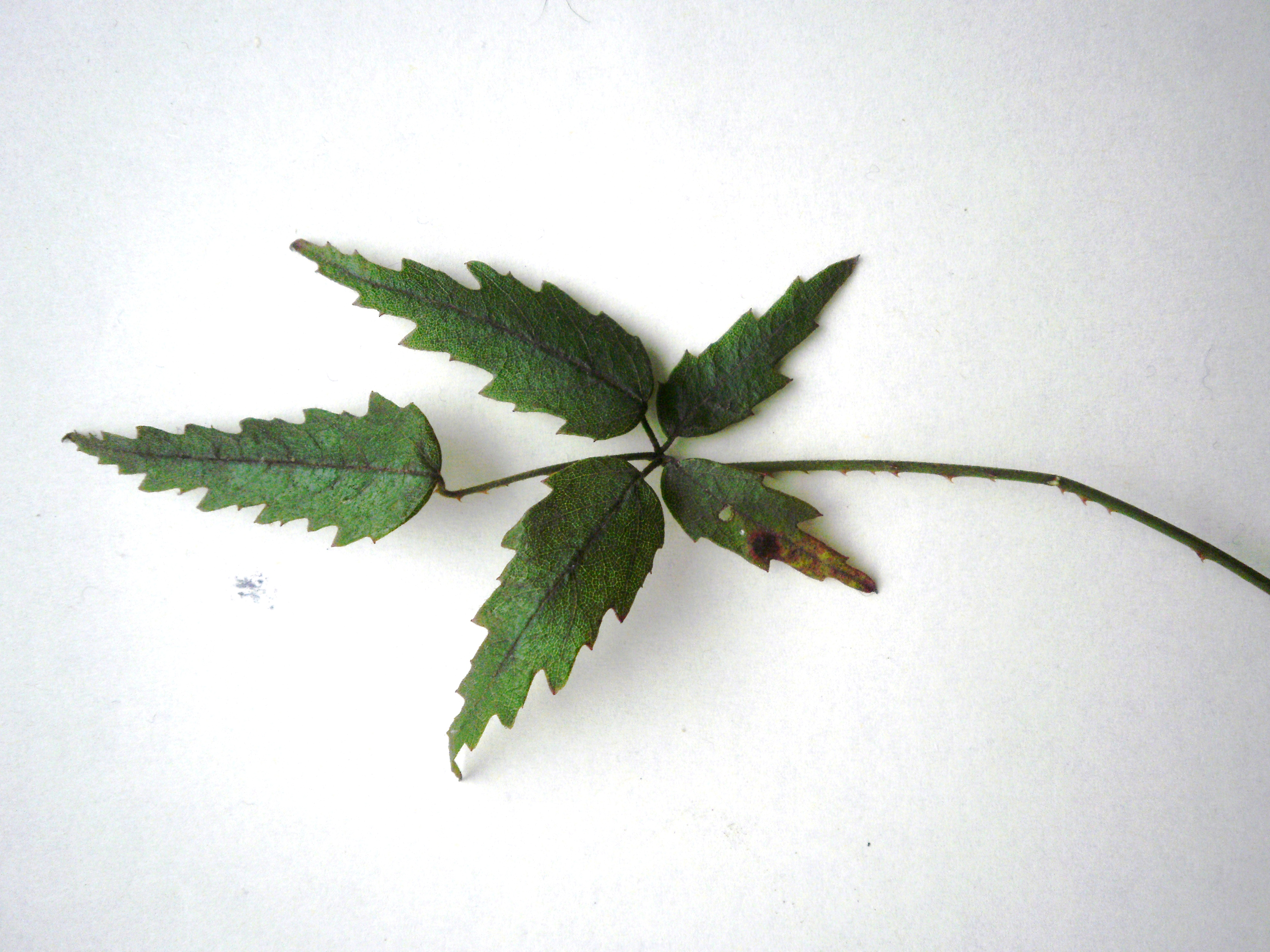

Scientific classification
- Kingdom: Plantae
- Clade: Embryophytes
- Clade: Tracheophytes
- Clade: Angiosperms
- Clade: Eudicots
- Clade: Rosids
- Order: Rosales
- Family: Rosaceae
- Genus: Rubus
- Subgenus: Rubus subg. Micranthobatus
- Species: R. schmidelioides

Binomial name
- Rubus schmidelioides A.Cunn.

= Rubus schmidelioides =

Species of fruit and plant

Rubus schmidelioides, commonly called bush lawyer or white leaved lawyer, is a climbing plant species found commonly in New Zealand. The Māori names are tātarāmoa and akatātarāmoa. Typically found in scrub and forest, the plant's hooked branches allow it to climb across the ground and into shrubs and trees. The fruits are yellow to orange.

== Description ==
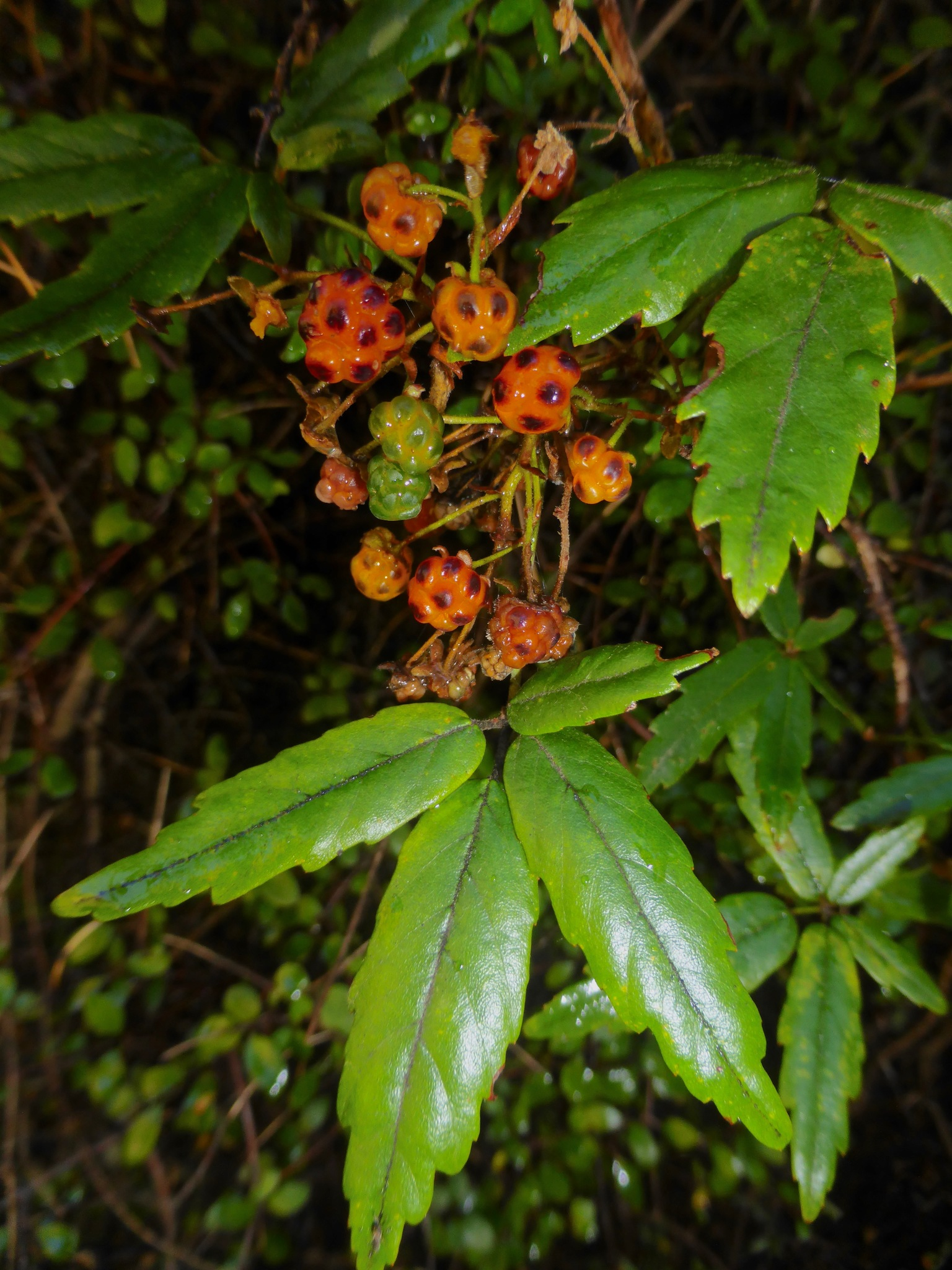
Leaves and ripe fruit

Rubus schmidelioides is a dicot liana and is a dense shrub with intertwining branchlets. It is a perennial plant that grows up to 10 metres (33 ft) long, or forms a bush when there is no support nearby. It ascends its host using small reddish hooks along its stems. The stems are long and tapering, up to 10 centimetres (4 in) in diameter. It has branchlets up to 40 mm (1.6 in) in diameter. These are covered in short soft hair when young but become hairless and smooth when mature, and grow large red spikes. It has small narrow stipules and petioles which are around 20 mm (0.79 in) long.

The leaves are glossy, ranging from orange to green/brown, and are arranged in a compound palmate pattern with 3–5 leaflets. The leaflets are terminal with an oval, oblong or lanceolate shape. There is a clear midrib on the leaves and they have a serrated margin. The bottom sides are grey-white. The leaflets are glabrous on the upper surface but hairy along the underside, with hair colour ranging from white, brown or grey. The leaves often curl downwards. Leaflets are commonly 2–6 cm (0.79–2.36 in) long, 2.5–3.5 cm (0.98–1.38 in) wide and the petiolule is on average 10–50 mm (0.39–1.97 in) long.

In juvenile plants, leaflets are narrower and more glabrous compared to the mature forms. In open scrubland environments, however, mature plants retain their juvenile leaves. This variant is called var. subpauperatus. On the Chatham Islands, the leaves of R. schmidelioides are on average larger than leaves from populations on New Zealand.

Inflorescences are on a 10 mm (0.39 in) long smooth branchlet, without spikes. Flowers are a white aggregate. The flower sepals are 2 mm (0.079 in) long and petals are 4–7 mm (0.16–0.28 in) long. Each flower has five petals. Full flowers are usually 10–25 cm (3.9–9.8 in) long. It has five white or cream petals which are usually up to 5–7 mm (0.20–0.28 in) long and have an oval shape. Fruit of the plant is yellow or orange and composed of 8–12 aggregate drupelets to form a fruit 5–9 mm (0.20–0.35 in) in diameter. The fruits of R. schmidelioides are aggregate drupelets and are yellowish. Their size is usually 5–7 mm (0.20–0.28 in) long.

=== Phenology ===
Rubus schmidelioides flowers from September until November. These flowers are white and hang in long panicles. The plant then fruits from December until April. It reproduces through male and female flowers. Male flowers contain numerous stamens with an ovary that is either absent or undeveloped. Female flowers have a rudimentary stamen and several carpels.

=== Similar species ===
Rubus schmidelioides can be easily distinguished from other introduced sub-species of Rubus as it has much smaller flowers and does not have long hairs on its stems, which other Rubus species tend to have. It also has much more visible spikes on its stems due to their red colouring.

== Taxonomy ==
The species was first formally described by English botanist Allan Cunningham in 1839. It is a member of the subgenus Micranthobatus, which includes forest vines endemic to New Zealand and Australia. The species epithet schmidelioides means "Like Schmidelia", a former genus name used for soapworts.

The species has two variants, Rubus schmidelioides var. schmidelioides, and Rubus schmidelioides var. subpauperatus.

=== Etymology ===
The Māori language name tātarāmoa is used in other Polynesian languages to refer to plants of the genus Caesalpinia, which while unrelated, have spiky fruits. The name refers to spurs on rooster feet. Other name used in Māori is akatātarāmoa. The English language name lawyer is used for a number of scrambling varieties of Rubus, and likely refers to the hooks of the plant being difficult to remove.

== Distribution and habitat ==
Rubus schmidelioides var. schmidelioides and its variant var subpauperartus are both endemic to New Zealand and the Chatham islands. It is found mainly in the South Island in eastern Canterbury but can also be found in other areas of the country and on Stewart Island.

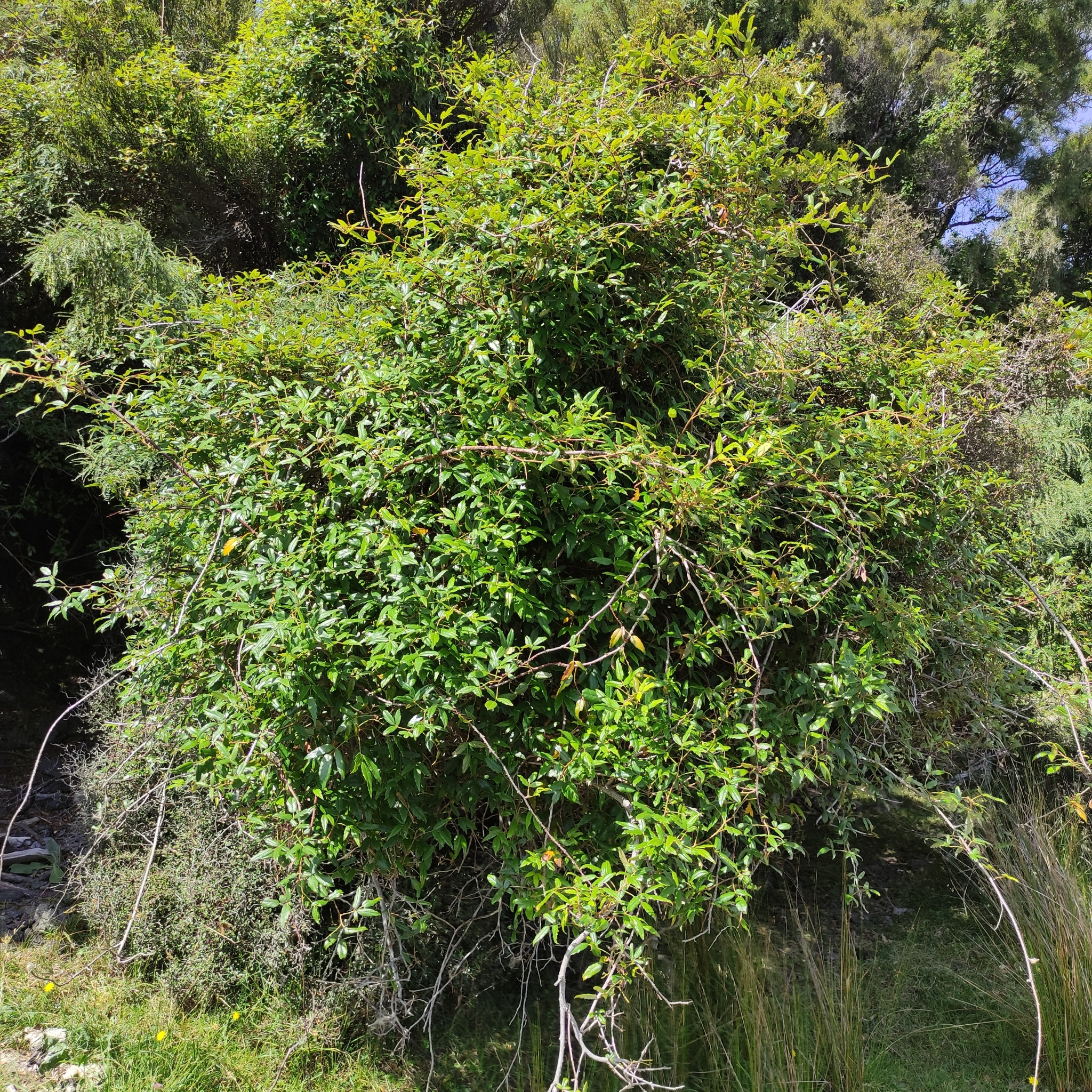
Rubus schmidelioides is typically a liana, growing on other trees and shrubs

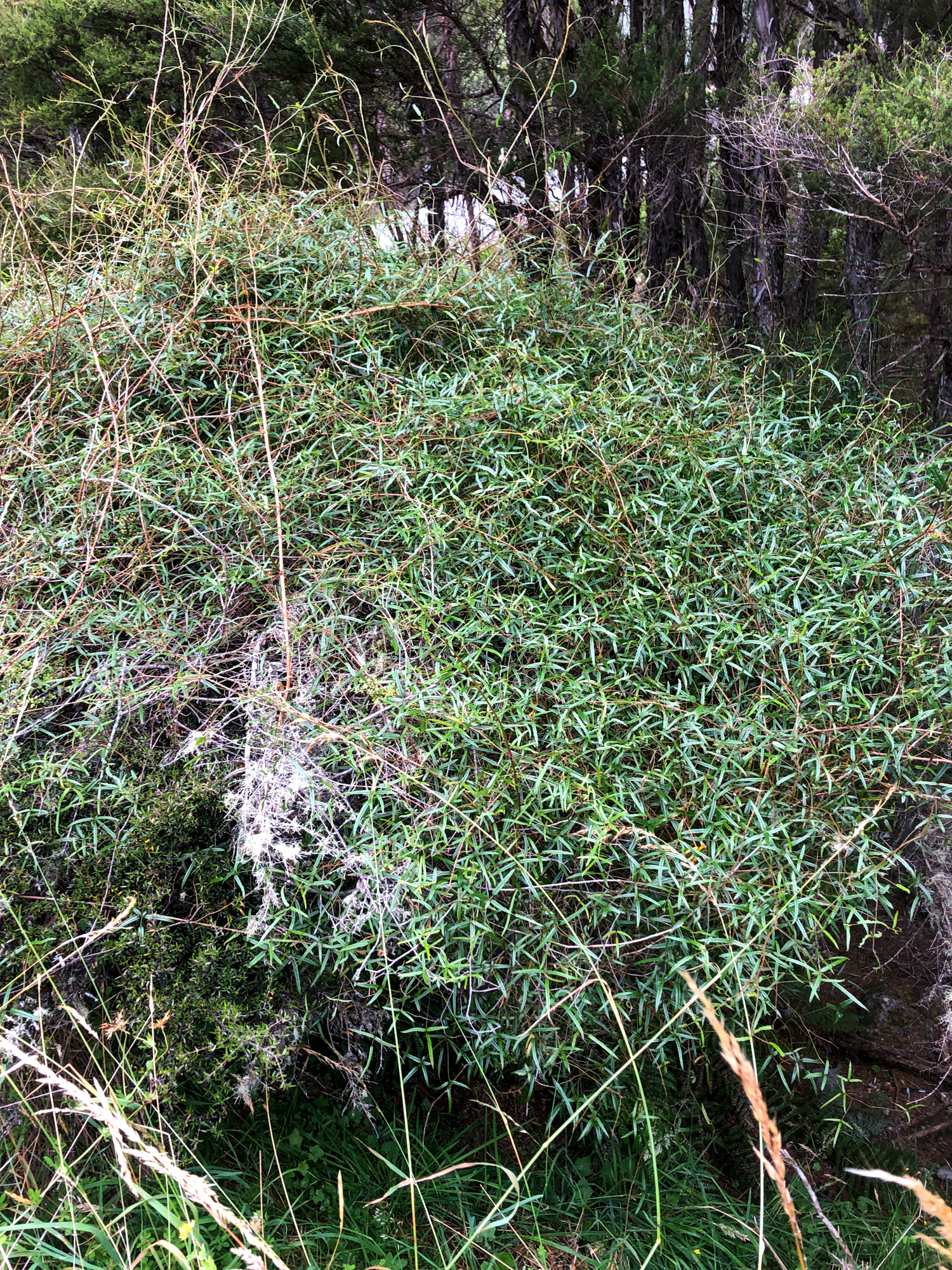
Rubus schmidelioides can form dense thickets when no plants are closeby

Rubus schmidelioides is found primarily in scrub and forest. Its variant, Rubus schmidelioides var. subpauperatus, can be found in open scrublands or exposed rocky sites. It has previously been found in the driest vegetation zones surrounding lakes and in a freshwater wetland near the Waitangiroto River.

Rubus schmidelioides grows best during the mid-stages of succession when the tree canopies have not grown high. Juveniles struggle to grow in areas of low light where the canopy is already established. Rubus schmidelioides favors environments with alluvial soils and appears to be more common in indigenous forests.

== Ecology ==
A gall mite Acalitus rubensis commonly feeds on R. schmidelioides and causes erineum on the underside of the leaflets in the process. The adults of the endemic beetle Eucolaspis feed on the leaves. Endemic caterpillars of the moth Heterocorssa rubophaga feed in flowers, on fruit and the young shoots of R. schmidelioides, and induce gall on the stems. An endemic flat mite species Tenuipalpus rangiorae feed on R. schmidelioides leaves and lay eggs on the surface of the leaflets. The larvae of gall flies, one leaf vein, one stem and petiole gall species and one stem gall species inflict galls on the upper side of the leaflets, mid ribs of the leaf and stems respectively. An endemic species of scale insect feeds on R. schmidelioides and causes sooty mold on its leaflets.

Rubus schmidelioides leaflets and fruit are both eaten by possums and leaflets are also browsed by introduced deer, although neither have a large impact on R. schmidelioides distribution. Rubus schmidelioides is susceptible to both European blackberry rust and the rust species Kuehneola uredines. Kererū, kākā, riflemen, pipipi, grey warbler, fantail and silvereye are all observed to eat R. schmidelioides berries. The woody twigs and leaflets were likely grazed by moa before their extinction. The plant has domatia.

Rubus schmidelioides is pollinated by the introduced honey bee and the endemic bee Lasioglossum.

== Conservation ==
Its current conservation status is not threatened.

== Uses ==
Noticing similarities to European wild blackberries, Early European settlers in New Zealand used tātarāmoa berries to create foods such as preserves or jams.

== In culture ==
Some traditions involving the Polynesian navigator Kupe in Māori culture describe tātarāmoa as a plant lain down by Kupe as an obstacle, to prevent pursuing husbands, angry at Kupe for taking their wives.

Tātarāmoa berries are a traditional food in Māori culture, typically eaten by children. The bark and leaves of the plant has uses in rongoā medical practices, including infusions created from the leaves. It was used to "tonify the gut", "for treating respiratory congestion and coughs, and was chewed as a remedy for toothache". Along with other native plants in a steam bath, it was also used to treat rheumatism. The berries can also be used to create a traditional dye.

== Gallery ==
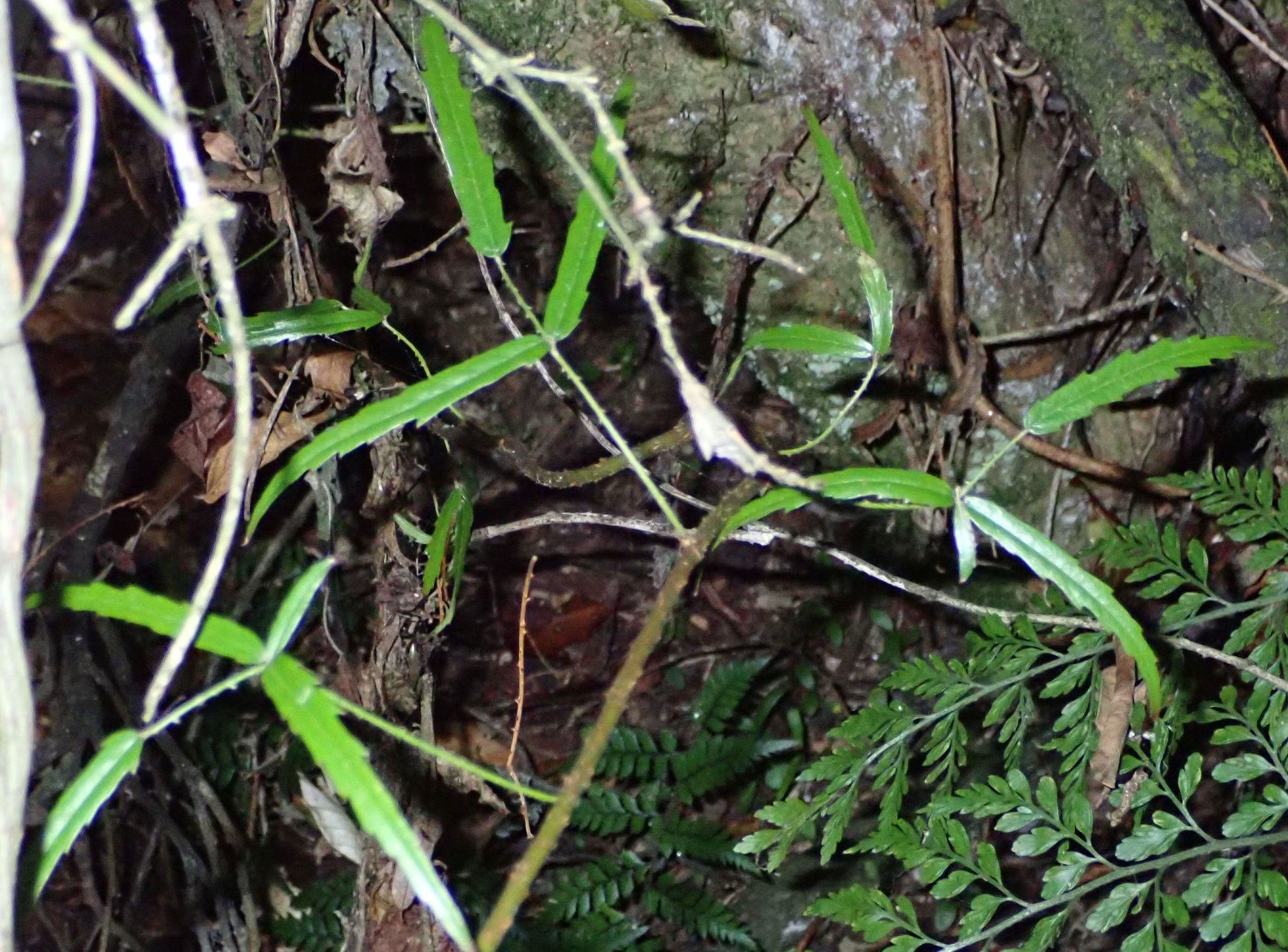
var. subpauperatus

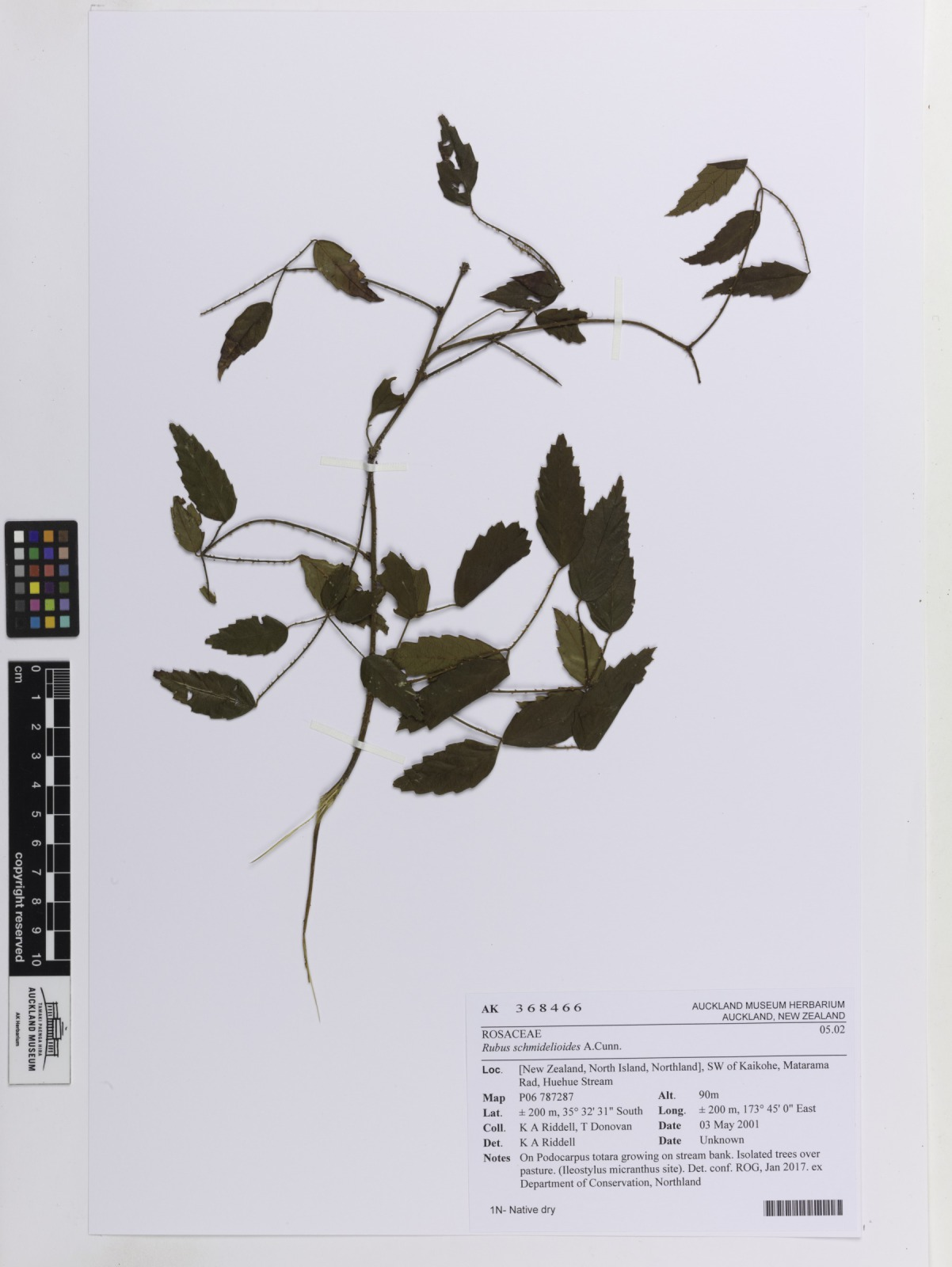
Herbarium specimen

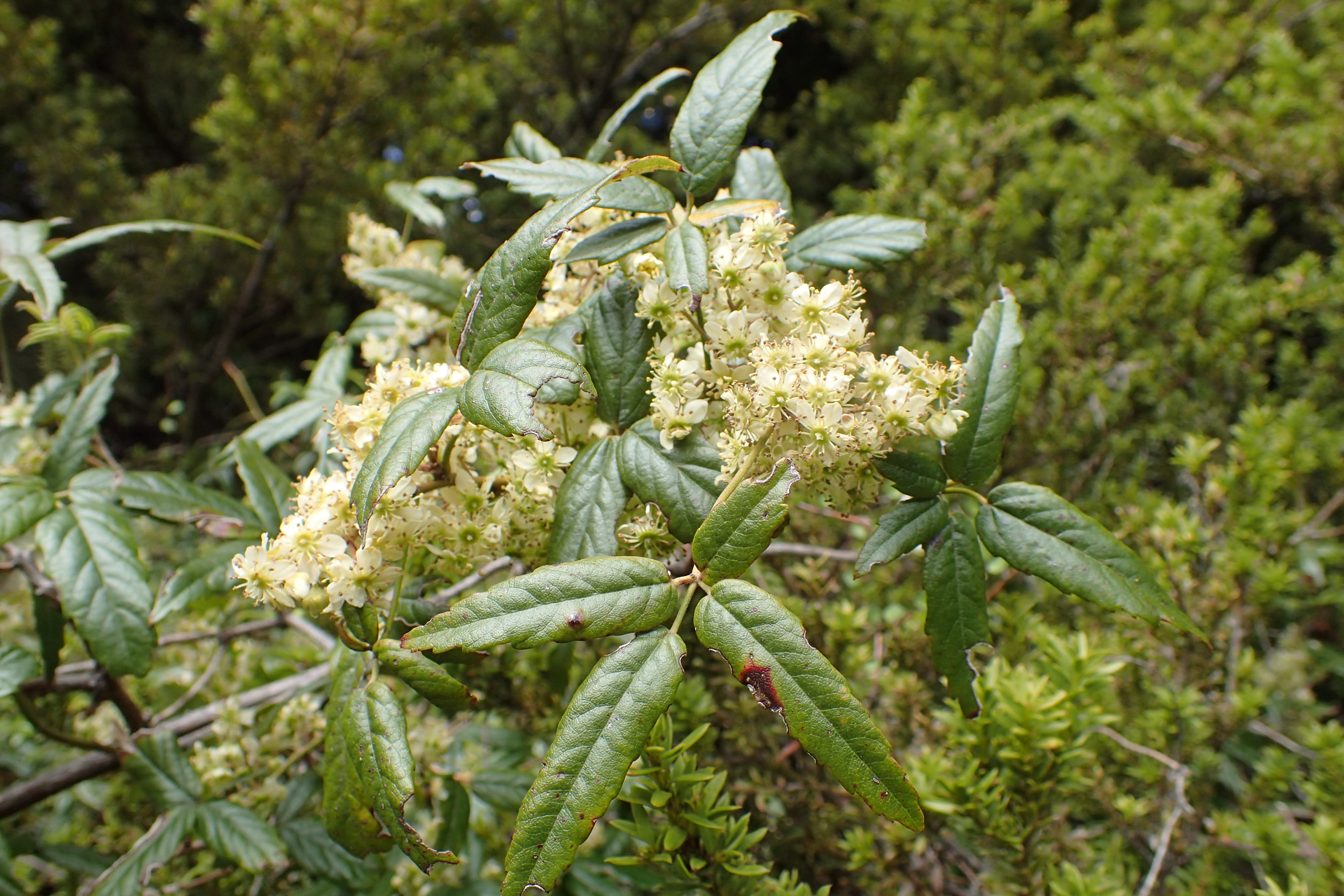
Flowers

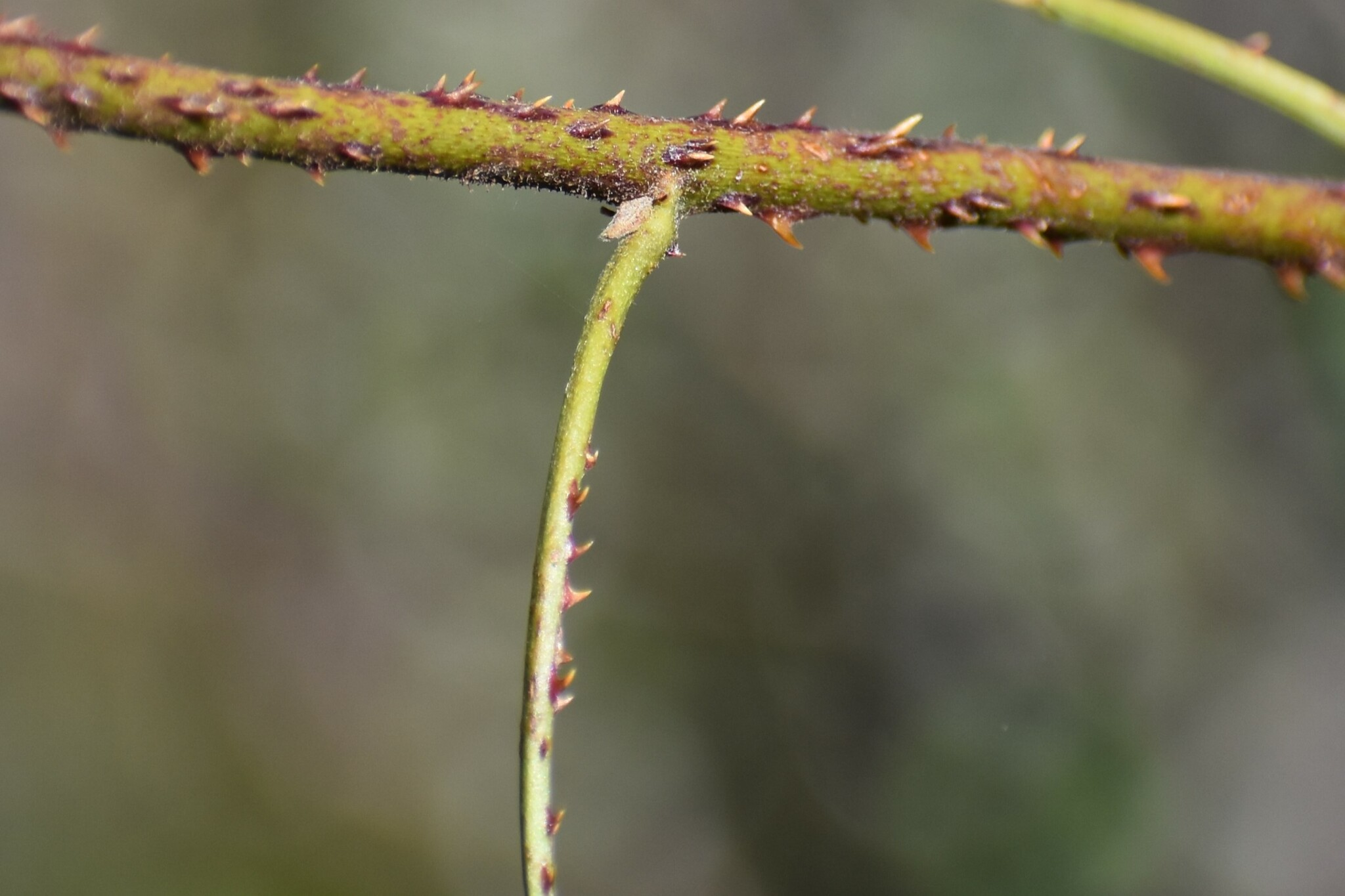
Thorns

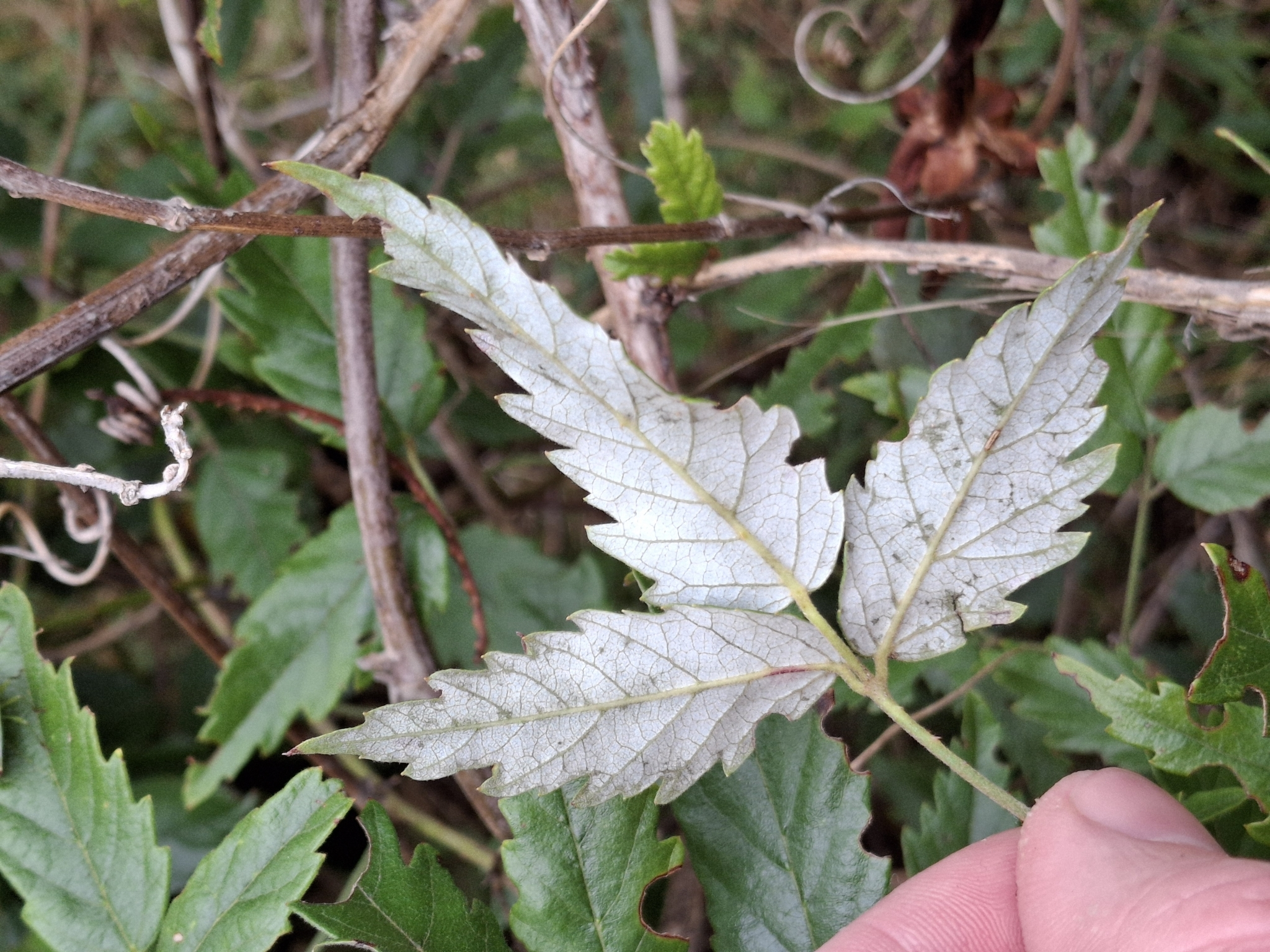
Underside of leaf
