= Rubus moorei =

Scientific classification
- Kingdom: Plantae
- Clade: Embryophytes
- Clade: Tracheophytes
- Clade: Spermatophytes
- Clade: Angiosperms
- Clade: Eudicots
- Clade: Rosids
- Order: Rosales
- Family: Rosaceae
- Genus: Rubus
- Species: R. moorei

Binomial name
- Rubus moorei F.Muell.

Synonyms
- Rubus moorei var. leichhardtianus Domin; Rubus moorei f. sericea C.T.White

Species of plant

Rubus moorei, the bush lawyer, is an Australian species of bramble. It forms a prickly shrub reaching up to 3 metres (10 feet). It is hermaphroditic and the fruit is up to 2.5 centimetres (1 inch) long.

The species is native to subtropical areas of southeastern Queensland and eastern New South Wales, Australia. The fruit is edible and good-tasting, but has many stony seeds.
