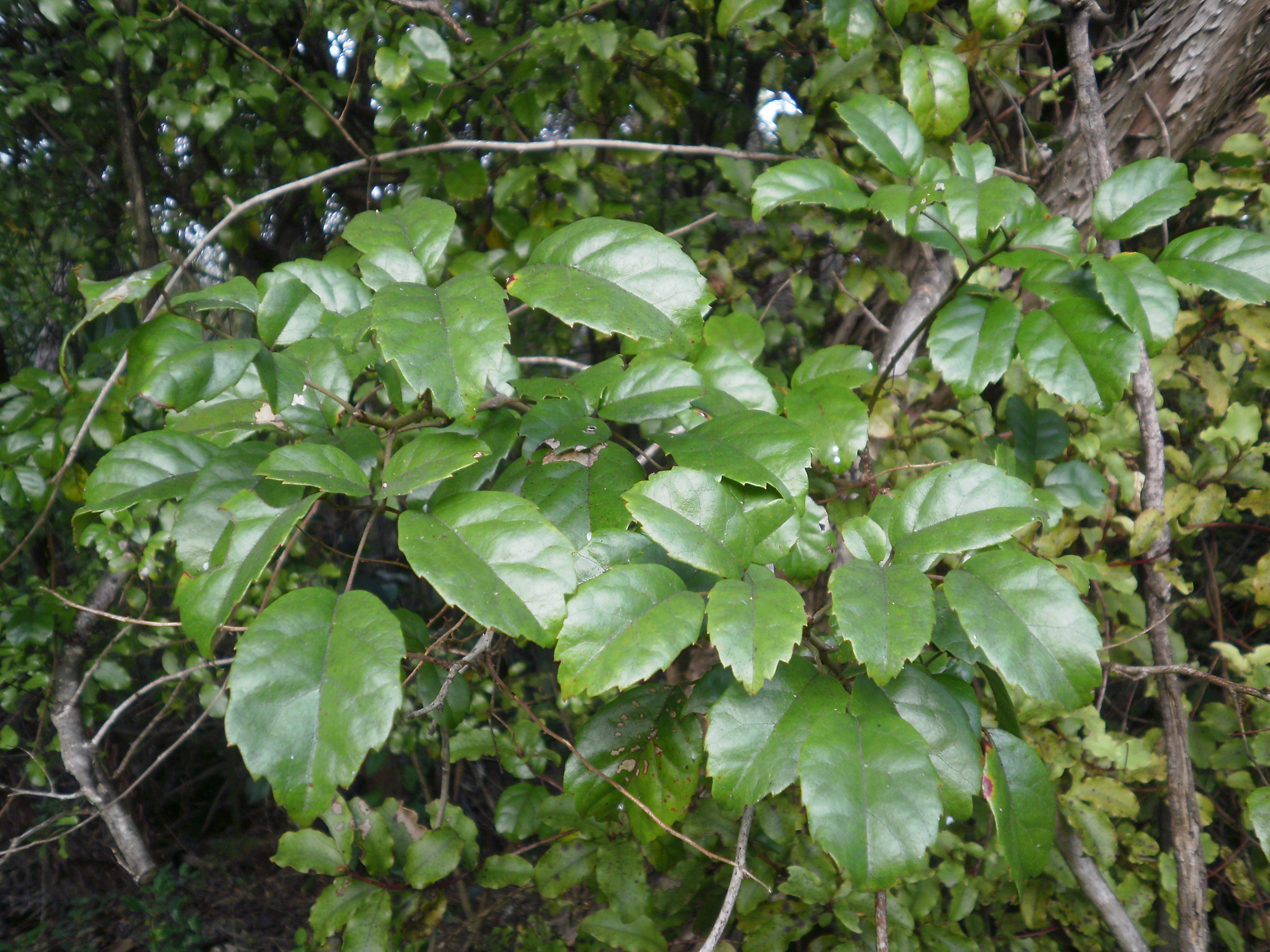

Scientific classification
- Kingdom: Plantae
- Clade: Tracheophytes
- Clade: Angiosperms
- Clade: Eudicots
- Clade: Rosids
- Order: Rosales
- Family: Rosaceae
- Genus: Rubus
- Subgenus: Rubus subg. Micranthobatus
- Species: R. australis

Binomial name
- Rubus australis G.Forst.

= Rubus australis =

Species of plant endemic to New Zealand

Rubus australis, commonly called swamp lawyer, is a climbing plant species found in New Zealand. Its hooked branches allow it to climb across the ground and into shrubs and trees.

R. australis produces yellow- to red-coloured fruit, while small white flowers are produced between October and November. The Māori language name of the plant is tātarāmoa.
