= Evans Peak (British Columbia) =

Mountain in British Columbia, Canada

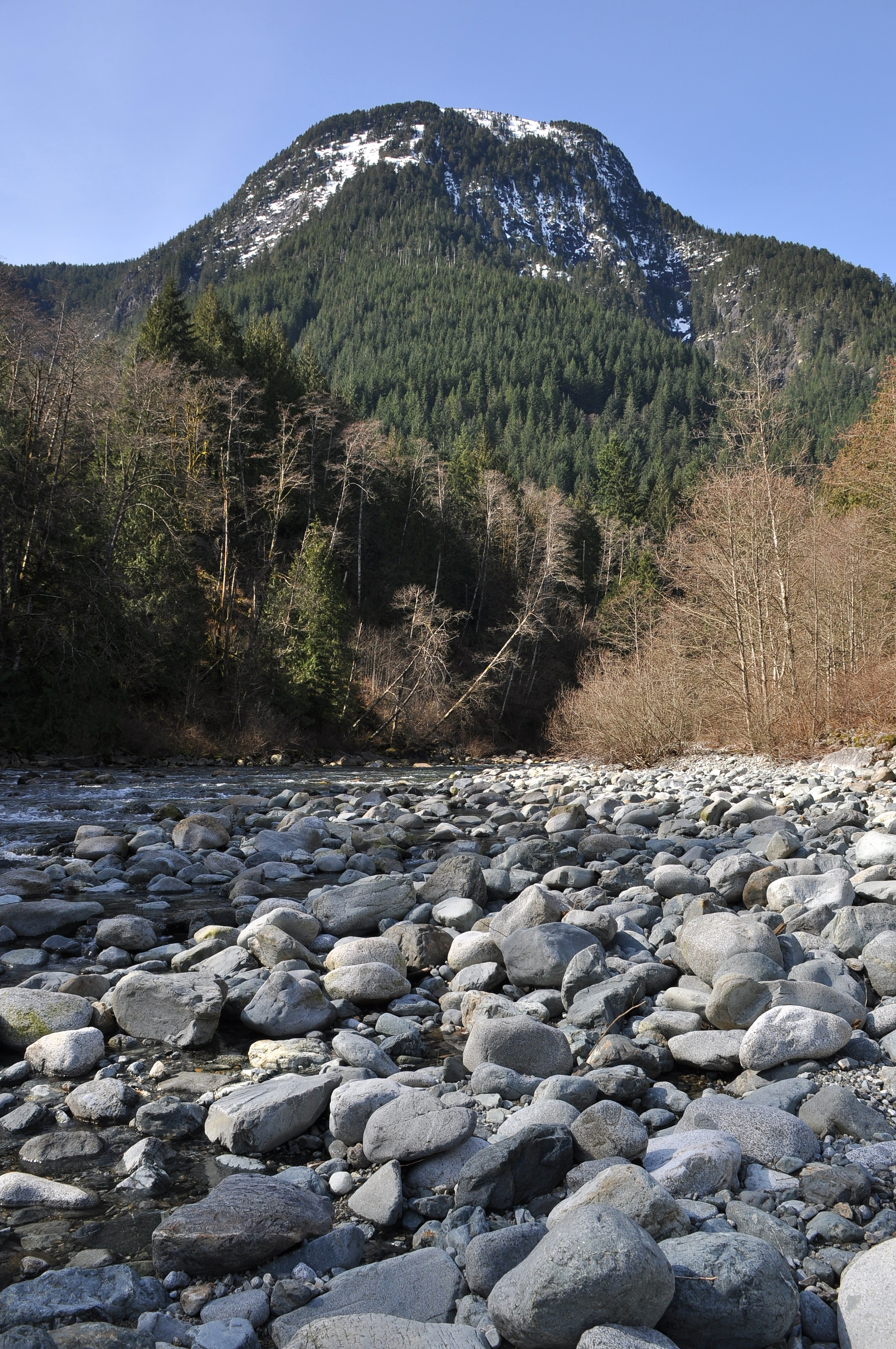

Highest point
- Elevation: 1,132 m (3,714 ft)
- Prominence: 132 m (433 ft)
- Parent peak: Alouette Mountain 1361 m
- Listing: Mountains of British Columbia
- Coordinates: 49°20′16″N 122°28′40″W

Geography
- Location within British Columbia
- Interactive map of Evans Peak
- Location: Golden Ears Provincial Park, British Columbia, Canada
- District: New Westminster Land District
- Parent range: Garibaldi Ranges
- Topo map: NTS 92G8 Stave Lake

Climbing
- Easiest route: Hike

Evans Peak is a peak to the Northwest of Alouette Lake in Golden Ears Provincial Park, British Columbia.

The peak is named for a father and son, Leslie and John Evans, who vanished in the valley between Edge Peak and Blanshard Peak in the spring of 1966. An extensive search failed to find them and are presumed dead.
