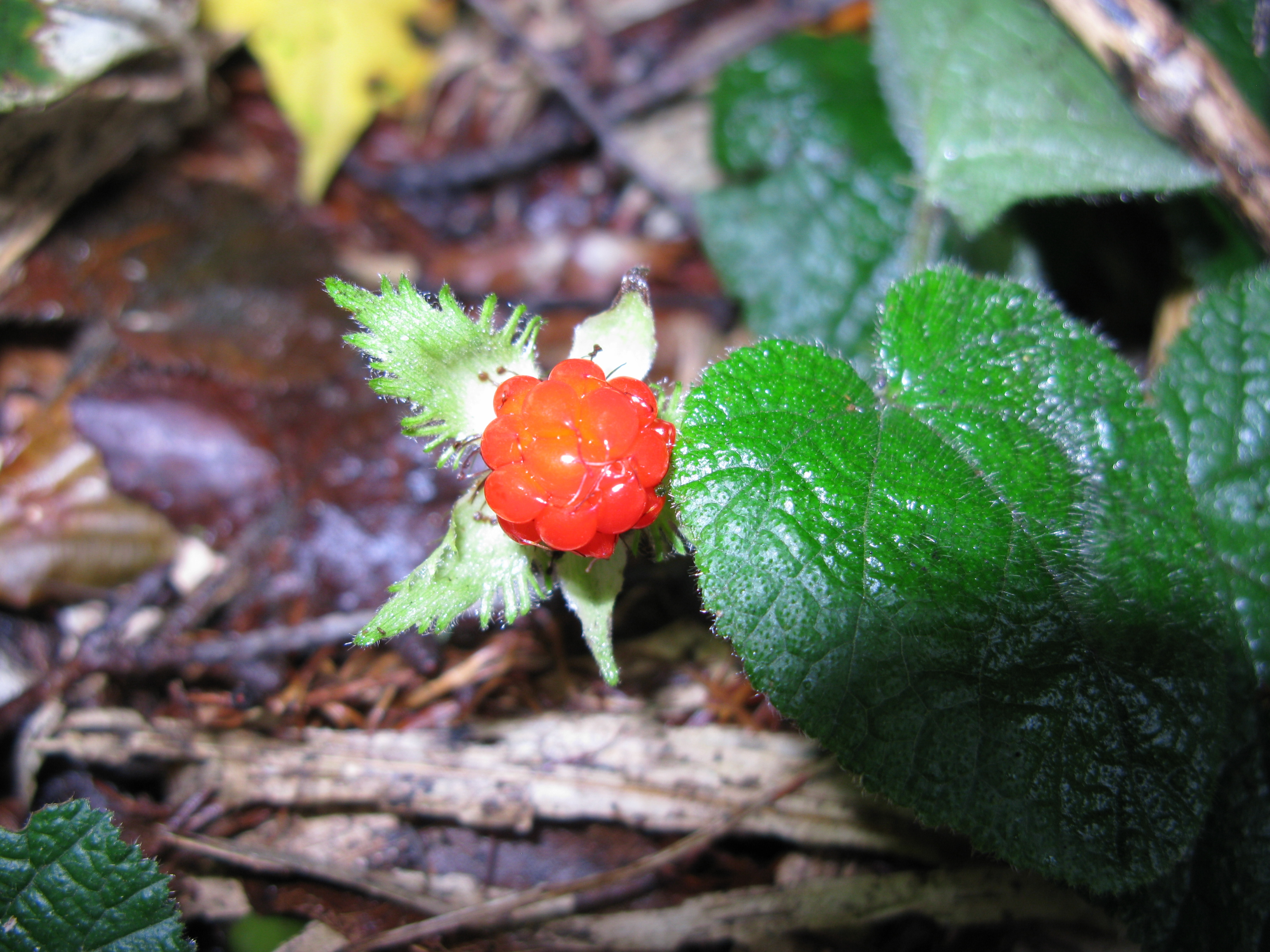
- Rubus pectinellus

Scientific classification
- Kingdom: Plantae
- Clade: Tracheophytes
- Clade: Angiosperms
- Clade: Eudicots
- Clade: Rosids
- Order: Rosales
- Family: Rosaceae
- Genus: Rubus
- Subgenus: Rubus subg. Chamaebatus; Focke

Type species
- Rubus rolfei

= Rubus subg. Chamaebatus =

Subgenus of fruits and plants

Rubus subgenus Chamaebatus is a subgenus of flowering plant in the rose family. Species within this subgenus are:

Image	Name	Distribution
	R. calycinus Wall. ex D. Don 1825	China (Sichuan, Xizang, Yunnan), Bhutan, India (Sikkim), Indonesia (Java), Myanmar, Nepal
	R. nivalis Douglas ex Hook. 1832	Canada (British Columbia), United States (Washington, Idaho, Oregon, California)
	R. pectinarioides H.Hara 1972	China (Xizang, Yunnan), Bhutan, India (Sikkim)
	R. pectinaris Focke 1910	India (Arunachal Pradesh), China (Sichuan)
	R. pectinellus Focke 1910	China (Fujian, Guizhou, Hubei, Hunan, Jiangxi, Sichuan, Taiwan, Yunnan, Zhejiang) Japan, Philippines
	R. rolfei S.Vidal 1885	Philippines, Taiwan
