= Crickmer =

Crickmer may refer to:

- Crickmer, West Virginia, a community in Fayette County, West Virginia
- Mount Crickmer, a mountain in the Garibaldi Ranges
- Walter Crickmer, an English football club manager
