= Golden Ears =

Golden Ears may refer to:

- Golden ear, a term for a person with an above-standard sense of hearing
- Golden Ears (mountain) a mountain in British Columbia
  - Golden Ears Provincial Park, a provincial park in British Columbia, Canada
  - Golden Ears Bridge, a bridge in British Columbia
