= Robie Lewis Reid =

Robie Lewis Reid (1866 – 1945) was a historian and jurist in British Columbia, Canada. Reid wrote many books and essays on the history of British Columbia, but his special interest was the study of the works of Rudyard Kipling. Another special field of interest was that coins of early British Columbia, concerning which he remains one of the main authorities.

== Biography ==
Reid was born in Cornwallis Township, Kings County, Nova Scotia, in the community of Steam Mill Village on November 3, 1866, but ventured to British Columbia in 1885 to Victoria, British Columbia, in 1885 to write the provincial teacher's examination. During this experience he met Frederic W. Howay, with whom he established a personal and professional relationship that lasted sixty years. Reid persuaded Howay to return to Nova Scotia with him to register for Law at Dalhousie University, from which they graduated together in 1890 and in 1893 formed the lawfirm Howay & Reid. Reid was appointed debenture commissioner for New Westminster after that city's Great Fire in 1898.

In 1907 Reid joined William J. Bowser, then Attorney-General of British Columbia and later Premier, and D.S. Wallbridge to form Bowser, Reid & Wallbridge. From 1927 to 1943 Reid was a Bencher of the Law Society of British Columbia. Reid was also a member of the UBC board of governors from 1913 to 1935, and President of the British Columbia Historical Association in 1937, and is credited with the founding of the British Columbia Historical Quarterly. He was made a Fellow of the Royal Society of Canada in 1936, and was also a Member of the American Historical Association, Washington.

Dr. Reid's interests in literature and the arts are also well documented. He was the first President of the Vancouver Little Theatre Association, and a member and chairman of the Board of the Vancouver Public Library.

He died on February 6, 1945, of failing health.

== Legacy ==
- Mount Robie Reid to the north of the Maple Ridge and Mission, British Columbia, near the Golden Ears, was named in commemoration of Reid, Mount Judge Howay just to the northeast was named for his colleague F.W. Howay.
- The Howay-Reid Collection at the University of British Columbia was founded by Reid's donation of his personal book collection of 9,000 books, over 4,000 pamphlets, and a collection of assorted other media, including maps, photographs, correspondences, plus 50,000 file cards naming books he had been searching for. At the time of its creation this was the largest collection of Canadiana anywhere in the country.
