= Alouette Lake =

Lake and reservoir in British Columbia, Canada

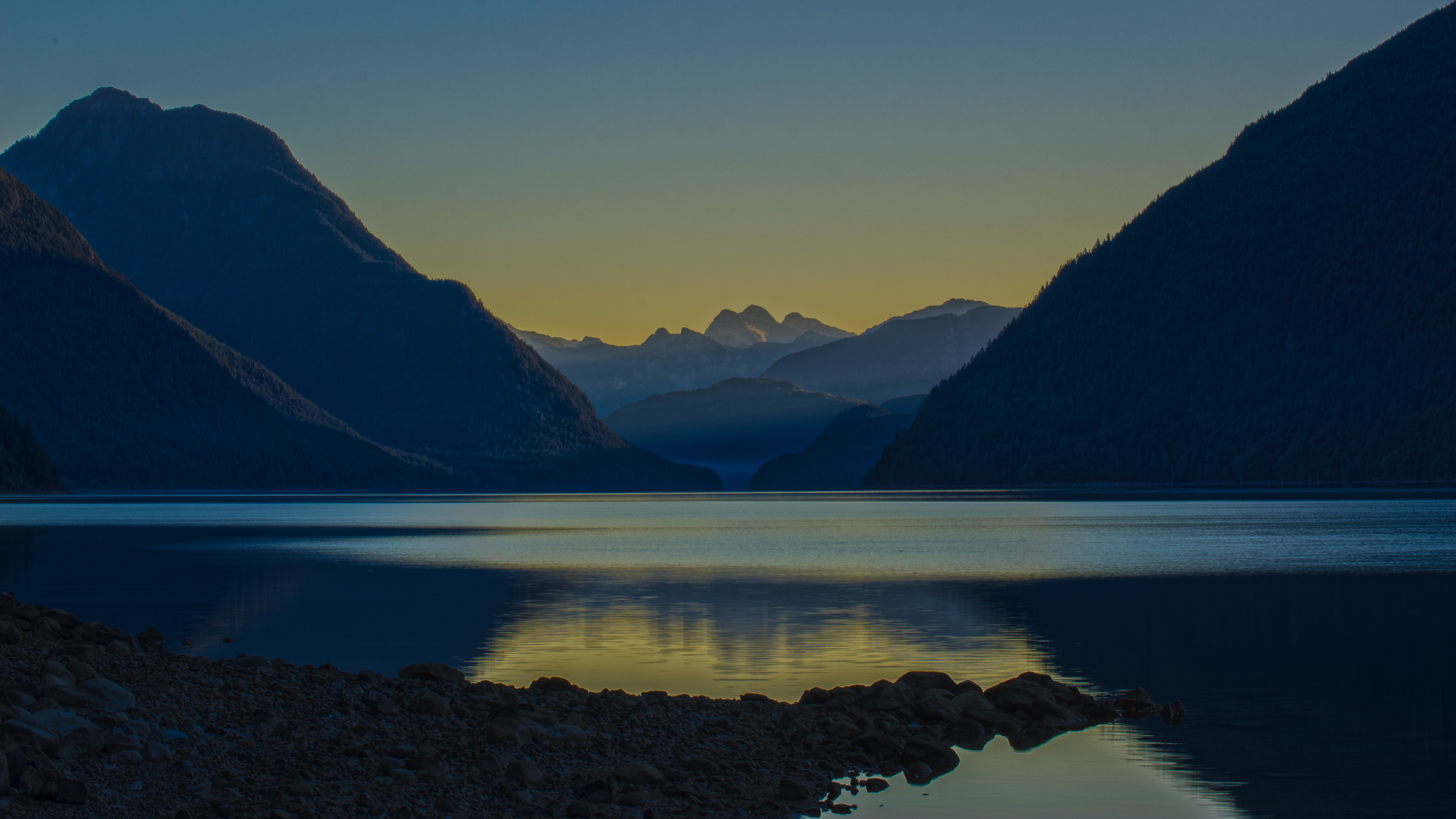
- Alouette Lake at sunrise

- Location within British Columbia
- Location: British Columbia
- Coordinates: 49°20′N 122°25′W
- Lake type: reservoir
- Primary inflows: South Alouette River, Gold Creek
- Primary outflows: South Alouette River
- Basin countries: Canada
- Max. depth: 522 ft (159 m)

Alouette Lake, originally Lillooet Lake and not to be confused with the lake of that name farther north, is a lake and reservoir in Maple Ridge, British Columbia, Canada. It is at the southeastern foot of the mountain group known as the Golden Ears and is about 16 km in length on a northeast–southwest axis. It, and the Alouette River (formerly the Lillooet River), were renamed in 1914 to avoid confusion with the larger river and lake farther north, with "Alouette", the French word for "lark", being chosen as being melodious and reminiscent of the original name in tone.

Most of the basin of Alouette Lake has never been logged and its north flank is protected as part of Golden Ears Provincial Park (formerly part of Garibaldi Provincial Park until that park's division). A small portion of the lake and its largely inaccessible northwestern shore, near its narrows, are actually part of the District of Mission due to the rectangular shape of that district's boundary. North of the portion of the lake that is in Mission, the rest of its northern end is not in either municipality.

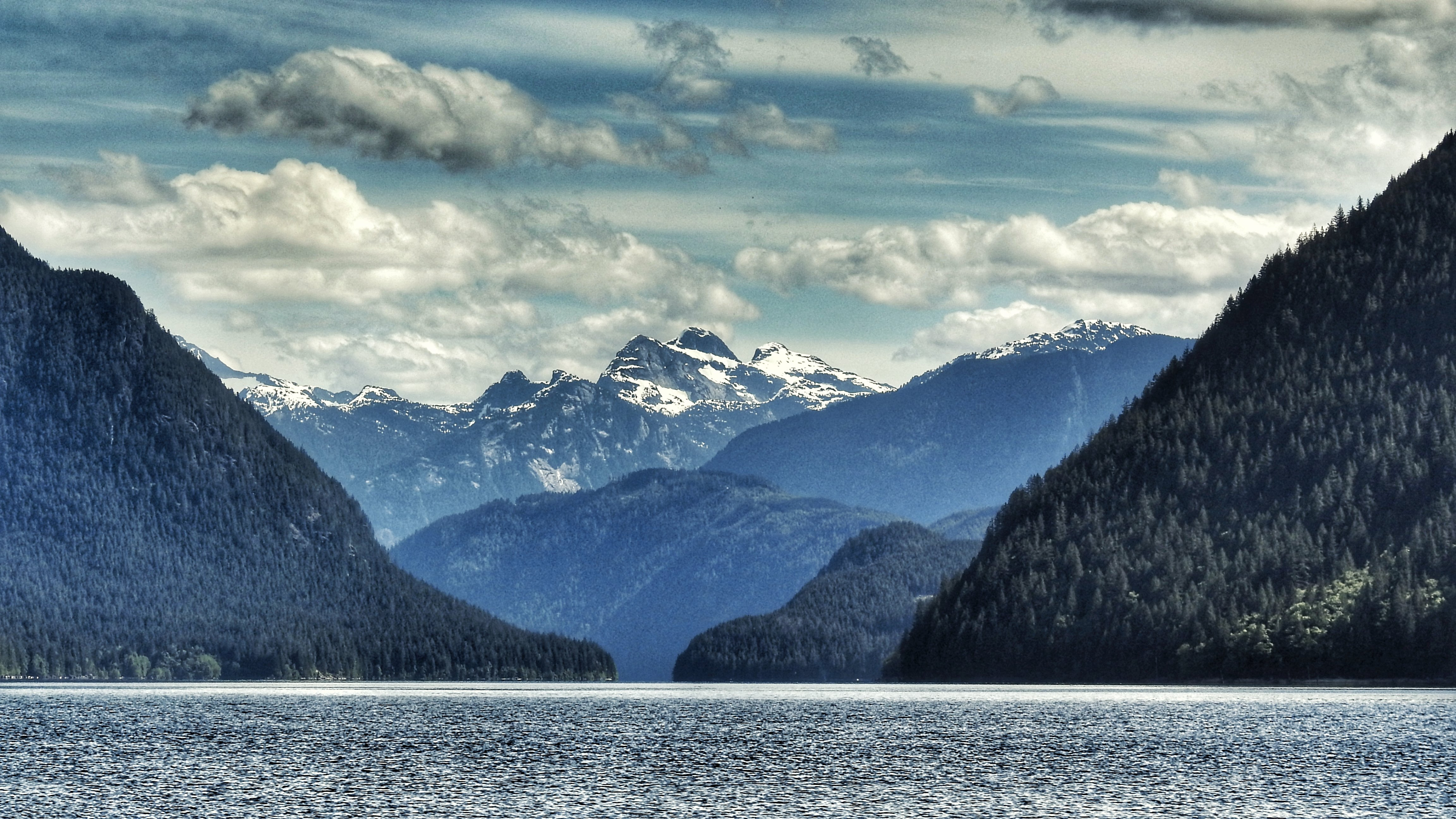
Looking northeast from Alouette Lake toward Stonerabbit Peak

== Alouette Dam ==
Originally only 2 km in length, the lake was considerably expanded by the 1928 construction of the Alouette Dam at 49°17′10″N 122°29′12″W, which is 11.5 km (7 mi) along the upper reaches of the South Alouette River. A 1,067 metres (3,501 ft) long tunnel connects Alouette Lake and Stave Lake. At the end of the tunnel is a penstock which feeds the small Alouette Powerhouse, an 8 MW power station operated by BC Hydro, which lies midway along the west shore of Stave Lake.49°22′16″N 122°18′47″W There is no powerhouse at the dam, however, as the point of the reservoir is to feed the tunnel through the flank of the ridge between Mounts Crickmer and Robie Reid. A former railway grade leading to the dam along the river was also used as a logging railway.

== Facilities ==
A large public beach, picnic site and campground that are part of the provincial park are located on the lake's western shore.

== Climate ==
Climate data for Alouette Lake
Month	Jan	Feb	Mar	Apr	May	Jun	Jul	Aug	Sep	Oct	Nov	Dec	Year
Record high °C (°F)	12.2 (54.0)	12.0 (53.6)	19.5 (67.1)	26.7 (80.1)	30.6 (87.1)	31.1 (88.0)	33.9 (93.0)	35.5 (95.9)	32.0 (89.6)	23.0 (73.4)	16.0 (60.8)	12.2 (54.0)	35.5 (95.9)
Mean daily maximum °C (°F)	3.3 (37.9)	6.0 (42.8)	8.1 (46.6)	12.8 (55.0)	16.2 (61.2)	18.5 (65.3)	22.5 (72.5)	22.2 (72.0)	18.6 (65.5)	13.1 (55.6)	7.2 (45.0)	4.5 (40.1)	12.8 (55.0)
Daily mean °C (°F)	0.9 (33.6)	3.1 (37.6)	4.5 (40.1)	7.8 (46.0)	11.1 (52.0)	13.8 (56.8)	16.8 (62.2)	16.9 (62.4)	13.9 (57.0)	9.3 (48.7)	4.6 (40.3)	2.2 (36.0)	8.7 (47.7)
Mean daily minimum °C (°F)	−1.5 (29.3)	0.1 (32.2)	0.9 (33.6)	2.8 (37.0)	6.0 (42.8)	8.9 (48.0)	11.1 (52.0)	11.5 (52.7)	9.1 (48.4)	5.5 (41.9)	2.0 (35.6)	0.0 (32.0)	4.7 (40.5)
Record low °C (°F)	−13.5 (7.7)	−10.0 (14.0)	−7.8 (18.0)	−2.8 (27.0)	−0.6 (30.9)	2.2 (36.0)	5.6 (42.1)	5.6 (42.1)	−0.6 (30.9)	−3.9 (25.0)	−6.0 (21.2)	−14.0 (6.8)	−14.0 (6.8)
Average precipitation mm (inches)	367.6 (14.47)	301.3 (11.86)	268.6 (10.57)	200.0 (7.87)	135.5 (5.33)	119.0 (4.69)	80.9 (3.19)	99.7 (3.93)	161.0 (6.34)	275.0 (10.83)	351.2 (13.83)	415.5 (16.36)	2,775.3 (109.27)
Average snowfall cm (inches)	36.0 (14.2)	12.0 (4.7)	12.6 (5.0)	1.1 (0.4)	0.3 (0.1)	0.0 (0.0)	0.0 (0.0)	0.0 (0.0)	0.0 (0.0)	0.0 (0.0)	6.1 (2.4)	25.2 (9.9)	93.3 (36.7)
Average precipitation days	21	19	20	18	15	15	9	12	13	18	21	23	204
Average snowy days	7	3	3	0	0	0	0	0	0	0	1	5	19
Source: Environment and Climate Change Canada

== See also ==
- List of lakes of British Columbia
