= R. L. Reid =

R. L. Reid may refer to:

- Robert Lewis Reid (1862–1929), American painter and muralist
- Robie Lewis Reid (1866–1945), Canadian historian and jurist
