= Mount Judge Howay =

Mountain in British Columbia, Canada

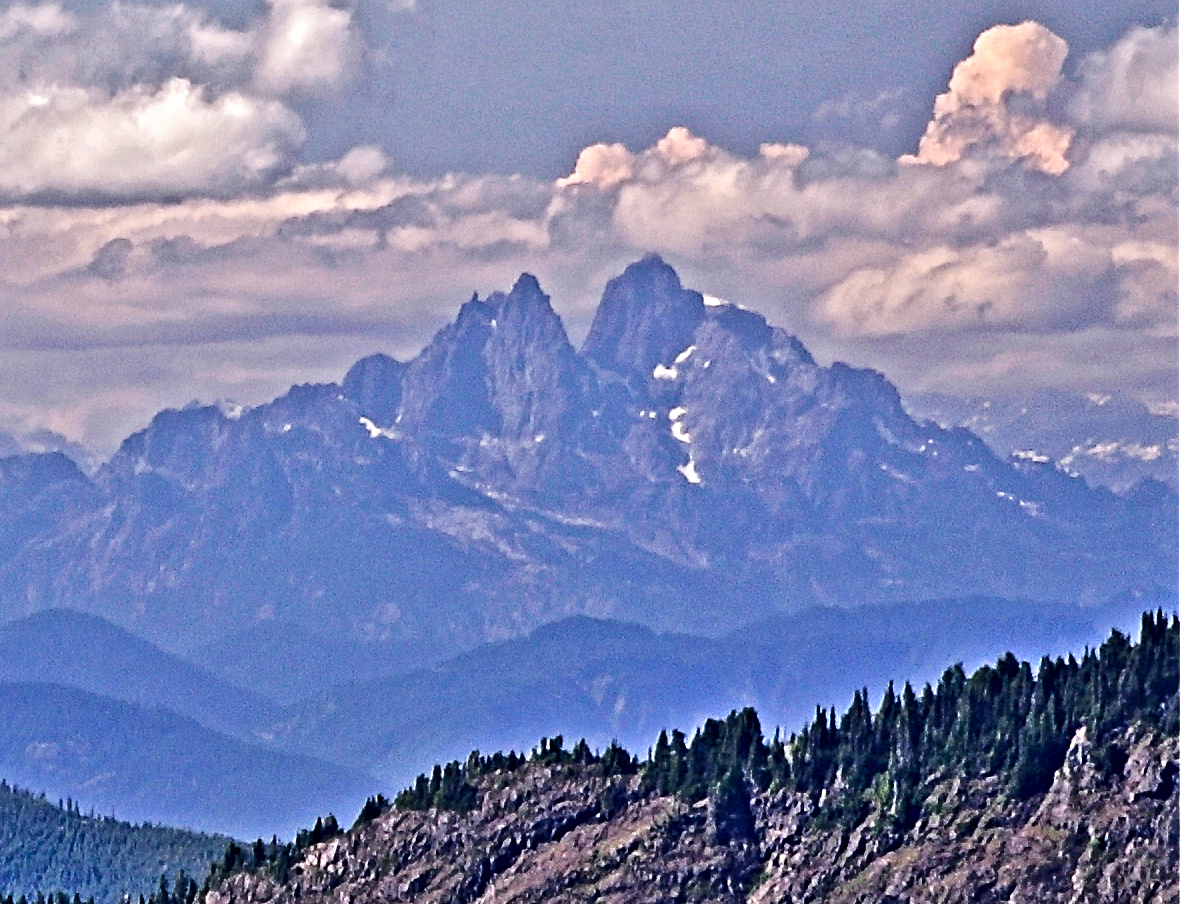

Highest point
- Elevation: 2,262 m (7,421 ft)
- Prominence: 1,627 m (5,338 ft)
- Listing: Mountains of British Columbia; Canada prominent peaks 98th
- Coordinates: 49°30′25″N 122°19′18″W

Geography
- Location within British Columbia Location within Canada
- Interactive map of Mount Judge Howay
- Location: Lower Mainland, British Columbia, Canada
- District: New Westminster Land District
- Parent range: Pacific Ranges
- Topo map: NTS 92G9 Stave River

Climbing
- First ascent: 1921 Tom Fyles; E. Fuller; H. O'Conner
- Easiest route: navigation, technical rock climbing

Mount Judge Howay, originally the Snow Peaks (a term which included Mount Robie Reid), is a distinctive twin summit located 10 km (6 mi) from the Central Fraser Valley and, close up, the north end of Stave Lake. Being one of the highest peaks in the region, it is visible from many of the peaks around Vancouver, British Columbia. It is in the eastern part of Golden Ears Provincial Park. Mount Robie Reid is to the south.

== Name ==
Mount Judge Howay is named for Frederic W. Howay, a noted jurist and judge primarily known for being an authority on the history of British Columbia. Just to the southwest, Mount Robie Reid commemorates his lifelong colleague in law and history, Robie Lewis Reid.

== Access ==
Due to its remote location and complicated topography, it is a very difficult peak to climb. To approach it from the southeast requires a canoe to get to the head of the lake, an approach on deactivated logging roads, a ford of the Stave River, climbing through steep Pacific Coast rainforest while orienteering through cliff bands.

== Climate ==
Based on the Köppen climate classification, Mount Judge Howay is located in a marine west coast climate zone of western North America.Most weather fronts originate in the Pacific Ocean, and travel east toward the Coast Mountains where they are forced upward by the range (Orographic lift), causing them to drop their moisture in the form of rain or snowfall.

== See also ==
- Geography of British Columbia
