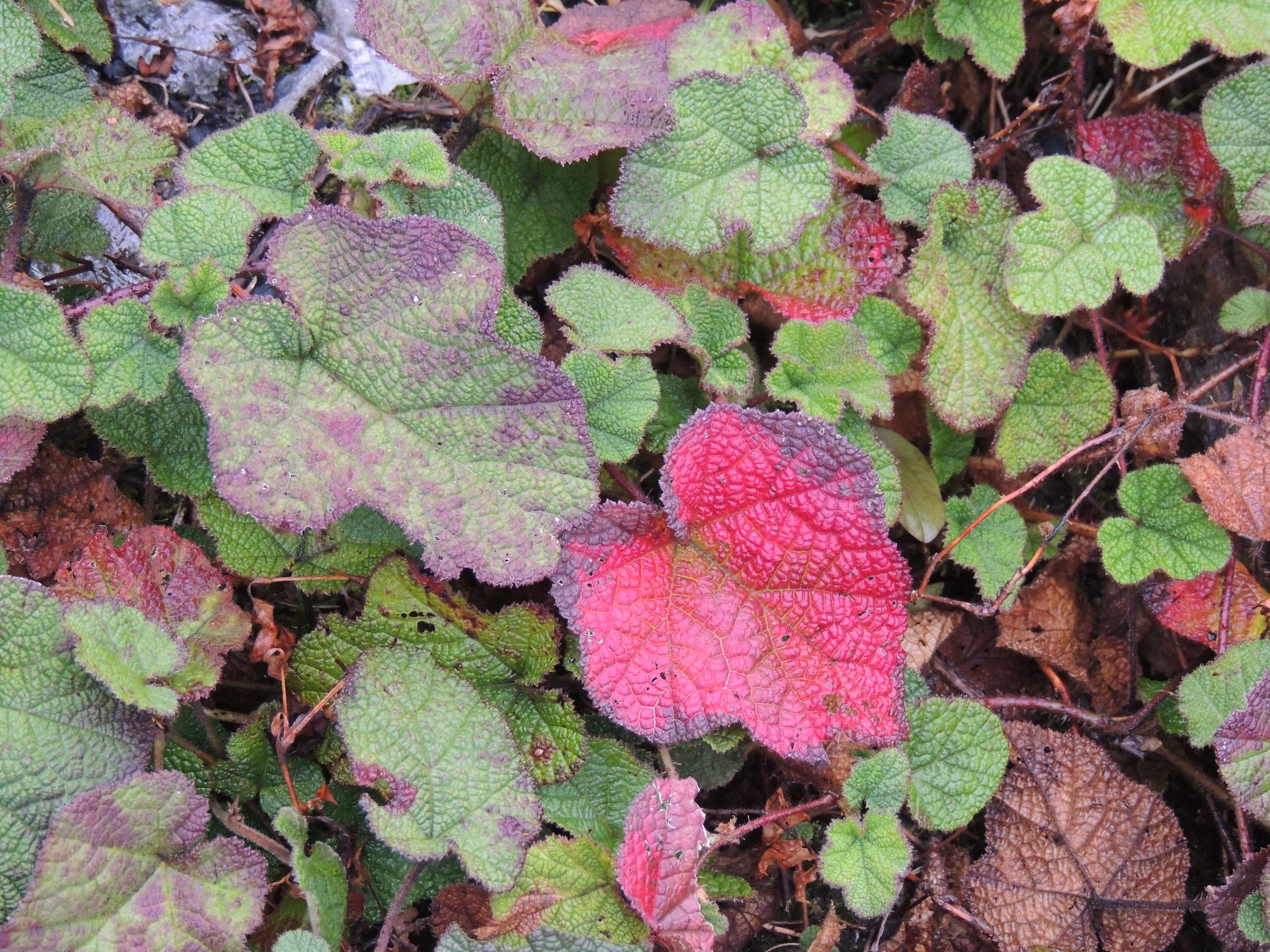

Scientific classification
- Kingdom: Plantae
- Clade: Embryophytes
- Clade: Tracheophytes
- Clade: Spermatophytes
- Clade: Angiosperms
- Clade: Eudicots
- Clade: Rosids
- Order: Rosales
- Family: Rosaceae
- Genus: Rubus
- Subgenus: Rubus subg. Chamaebatus
- Species: R. calycinus

Binomial name
- Rubus calycinus Wall. ex D.Don

= Rubus calycinus =

Species of fruit and plant

Rubus calycinus is a species of flowering plant in the rose family.

It forms a low-growing perennial plant with creeping, semi-woody main stems up to 3 metres (10 ft) long that root at the nodes and form dense carpets of growth on the ground. The fruit is produced on erect, sparsely branched or unbranched lateral stems up to 20 centimetres (8 in) tall that grow from the leaf nodes.
