= Alouette River =

River in British Columbia, Canada

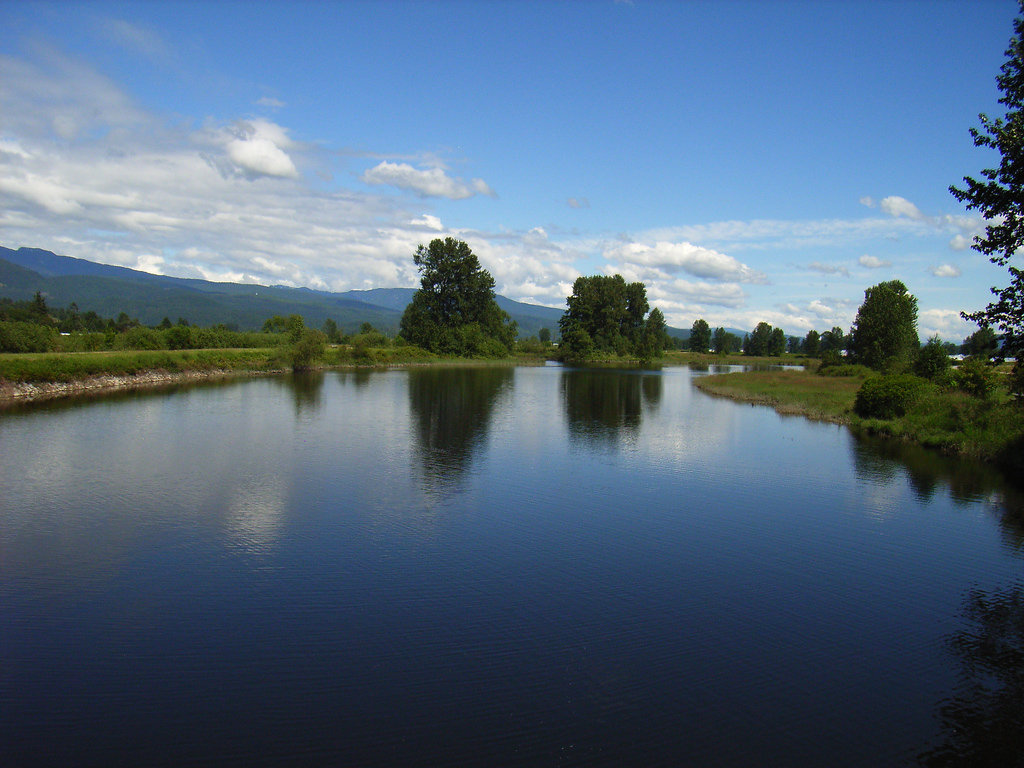

Location
- Country: Canada
- Province: British Columbia
- District: New Westminster Land District

Physical characteristics
- Mouth: Pitt River
  - coordinates: 49°15′52″N 122°42′31″W
  - elevation: 11 m (36 ft)
- Discharge
  - location: Haney
  - average: 5.16 m^{3}/s (182 cu ft/s)
  - minimum: 0.184 m^{3}/s (6.5 cu ft/s)
  - maximum: 236 m^{3}/s (8,300 cu ft/s)

Alouette River is a tributary of the Pitt River in the Canadian province of British Columbia.

The Alouette River was known as the Lillooet River until 1914, at which time its name was changed to avoid confusion with the much larger Lillooet River. The name Alouette, French for "lark", was ostensibly chosen because it sounds similar to Lillooet.

== Course ==
The Alouette River is formed at the confluence of the North and South Alouette Rivers. The smaller of the two, the North Alouette flows from Jacobs Lake south to its confluence with the South Alouette. The river flows over a minor set of falls about halfway from its mouth. The South Alouette originates on the slopes of Mount Robie Reid and flows into Alouette Lake. After exiting the lake the river flows west before converging with the North Alouette. From there, the river flows west to join the Pitt River. The Pitt River flows south to join the Fraser River east of Vancouver.

== See also ==
- List of rivers of British Columbia
- List of tributaries of the Fraser River
