= Stonerabbit Peak =

Mountain in British Columbia, Canada

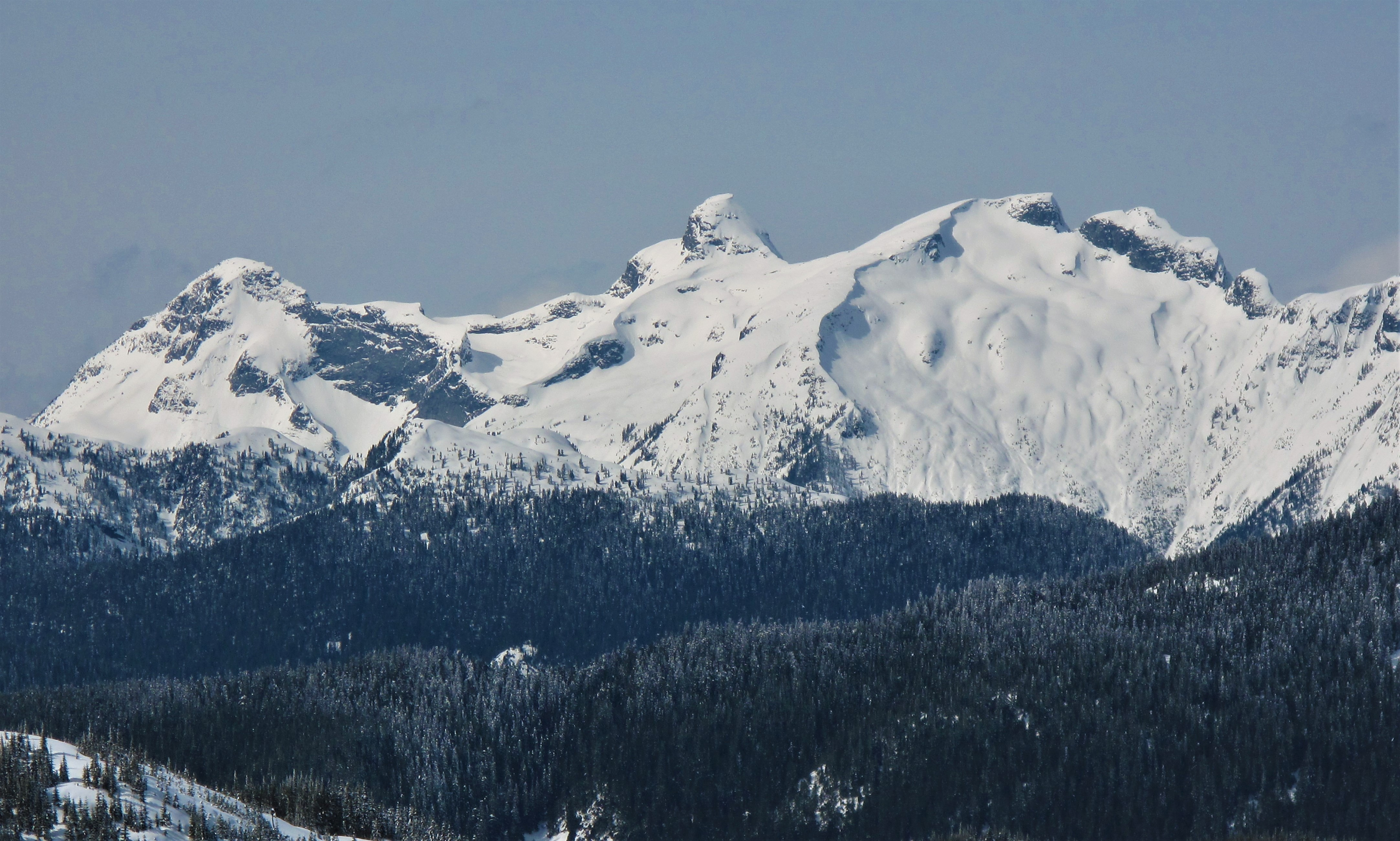
- Stonerabbit Peak (left), with Mt. Ratney (center) and Mt. Bardean (right). Southeast aspect

Highest point
- Elevation: 1,857 m (6,093 ft)
- Prominence: 172 m (564 ft)
- Parent peak: Mount Ratney (1,967 m)
- Isolation: 1.09 km (0.68 mi)
- Listing: Mountains of British Columbia
- Coordinates: 49°29′01″N 122°08′10″W

Geography
- Location within British Columbia Location within Canada
- Interactive map of Stonerabbit Peak
- Country: Canada
- Province: British Columbia
- District: New Westminster Land District
- Parent range: Coast Mountains
- Topo map: NTS 92G8 Stave Lake

Geology
- Rock type: Granite

Climbing
- Easiest route: Scrambling via West ridge

Stonerabbit Peak is a 1,857-metre (6,093-foot) mountain summit located in British Columbia, Canada.

== Description ==
Stonerabbit Peak is part of the Coast Mountains and is situated 35 km (22 mi) north-northwest of Chilliwack and 7 km (4 mi) northeast of the northern end of Stave Lake. Precipitation runoff from the peak drains west to Stave Lake, and east to Harrison Lake via Skwellepiol Creek, and ultimately to the Fraser River. Stonerabbit Peak is more notable for its steep rise above local terrain than for its absolute elevation as topographic relief is significant with the summit rising 1,720 m (5,640 ft) above Winslow Creek in approximately 5 km (3.1 mi).

== Etymology ==
The mountain is named after the summit cairn placed by the first ascent party. The mountain's toponym was officially adopted February 4, 1980, by the Geographical Names Board of Canada as recommended by Glenn Woodsworth, Geological Survey of Canada on behalf of Alpine Club of Canada, and as identified in BC Mountaineer Magazine, October 1976.

== Climate ==
Based on the Köppen climate classification, Stonerabbit Peak has a subarctic climate. Most weather fronts originate in the Pacific Ocean, and travel east toward the Coast Mountains where they are forced upward by the range (Orographic lift), causing them to drop their moisture in the form of rain or snowfall. As a result, the Coast Mountains experience high precipitation, especially during the winter months in the form of snowfall. Winter temperatures can drop below −20 °C with wind chill factors below −30 °C.

== Gallery ==
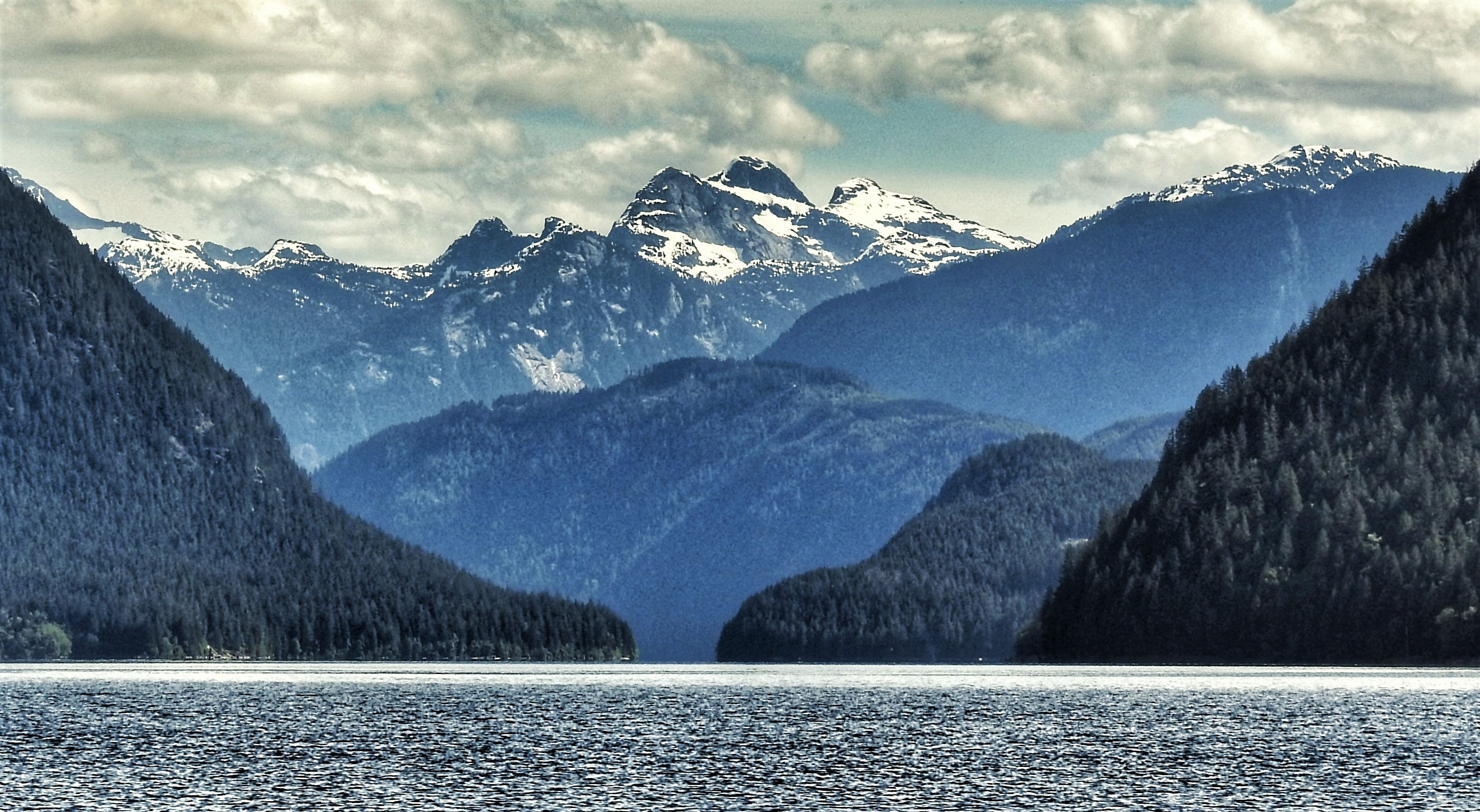
Looking northeast from Alouette Lake toward Stonerabbit Peak, Mount Ratney and Mount Bardean bunched together in the centre

== See also ==
- Geography of British Columbia
