= Rubus calycinoides =

Scientific classification
- Kingdom: Plantae
- Clade: Embryophytes
- Clade: Tracheophytes
- Clade: Spermatophytes
- Clade: Angiosperms
- Clade: Eudicots
- Clade: Rosids
- Order: Rosales
- Family: Rosaceae
- Genus: Rubus
- Species: R. calycinoides

Binomial name
- Rubus calycinoides Kuntze

Species of fruit and plant

Rubus calycinoides is a species of flowering plant in the rose family native to Asia from the Himalayas to Myanmar.

== Taxonomy ==
The species was described by Otto Kunze in 1879.

The botanical name Rubus calycinoides can be misleading, as the name was separately published to refer to two distinct species. R. calycinoides, as described by Bunzo Hayata and Gen-ichi Koidzumi in 1913, is now considered a taxonomic synonym of R. rolfei.
