= Edge Peak =

Mountain in British Columbia, Canada

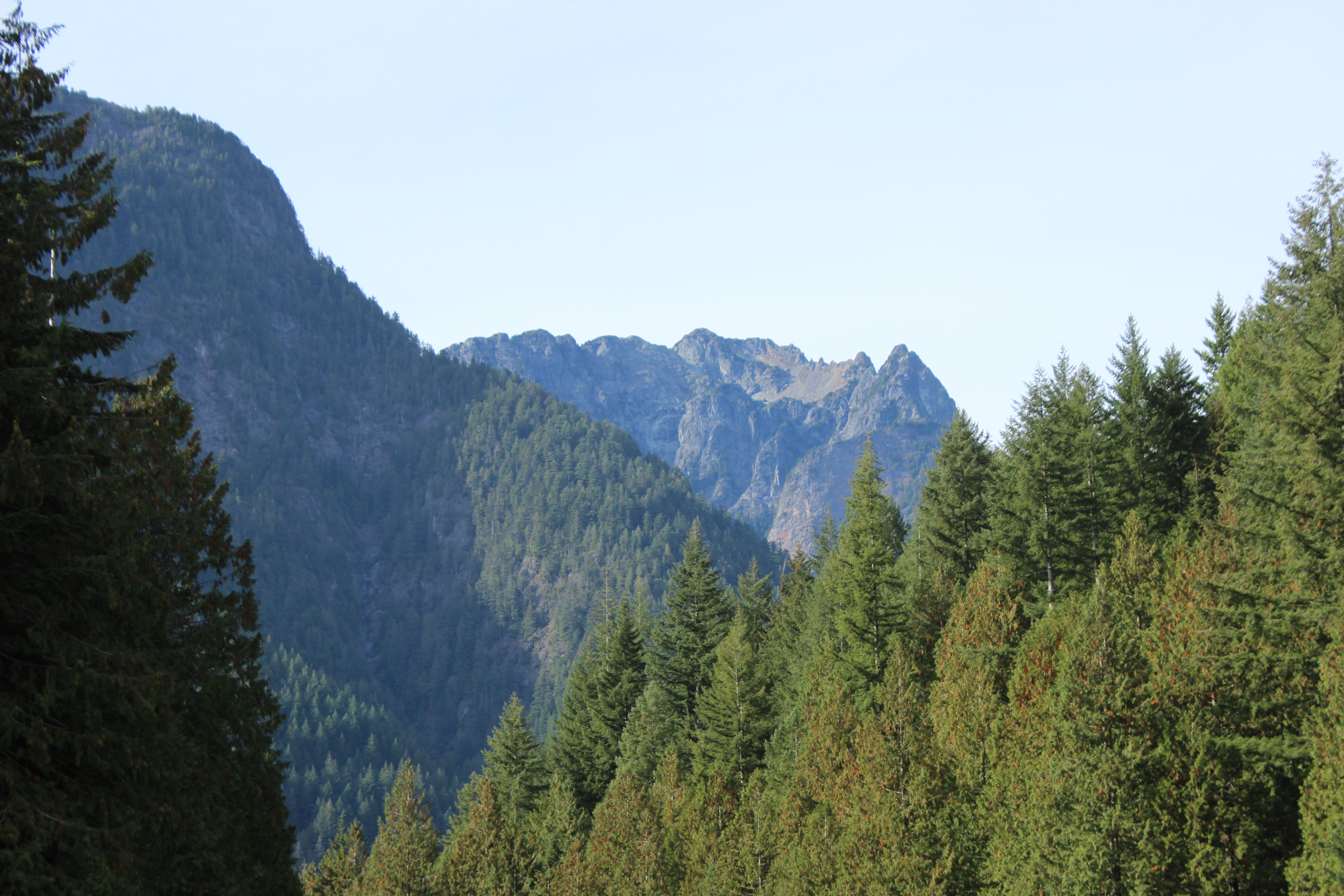
- Edge Peak viewed from the southeast

Highest point
- Elevation: 1,680 m (5,510 ft)
- Prominence: 250 m (820 ft)
- Coordinates: 49°21′22″N 122°29′53″W

Geography
- Location within British Columbia
- Interactive map of Edge Peak
- Location: British Columbia, Canada
- District: New Westminster Land District
- Parent range: Garibaldi Ranges
- Topo map: NTS 92G8 Stave Lake

Climbing
- First ascent: 1929 H. Sommerville; A. Lambert; D. McKee; J. Irving
- Easiest route: 3rd-4th class scramble

Edge Peak is a summit in the Golden Ears Group, located in Golden Ears Provincial Park north of Maple Ridge, British Columbia. The peak is not named for its shape but rather for Sam Edge who climbed it in 1876. Other mountains in this area include Golden Ears and Blanshard Peak.
