= Blanshard Peak =

Mountain in British Columbia, Canada

- Blanshard Needle
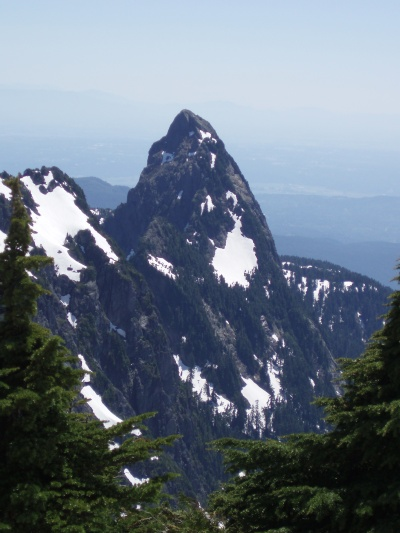
- Blanshard Peak seen from near the summit of Golden Ears (mountain)

Highest point
- Elevation: 1,550 m (5,090 ft)
- Prominence: 170 m (560 ft)
- Listing: Mountains of British Columbia
- Coordinates: 49°20′36″N 122°30′00″W

Geography
- Location within British Columbia
- Location in Golden Ears Provincial Park
- Country: Canada
- Province: British Columbia
- District: New Westminster Land District
- Parent range: Garibaldi Ranges
- Topo map: NTS 92G14 Cheakamus River

Climbing
- First ascent: 1918 P. James, Don Munday, M. Worsley
- Easiest route: 30 m of 5th class, 4th class scramble

Blanshard Peak also known as The Blanshard Needle by local climbers is a distinctive rock pinnacle in Golden Ears Provincial Park that is visible from many places in the Lower Mainland. Named for the first governor of the colony of Vancouver Island, the name of the summit and area is the subject of some confusion due to the labeling of the entire Golden Ears Group on the published maps for the area. Mount Blanshard is the proper name of the Golden Ears massif, and later became attached by authors of climbing guides to the summit at the southern end of the group.

== Gallery ==
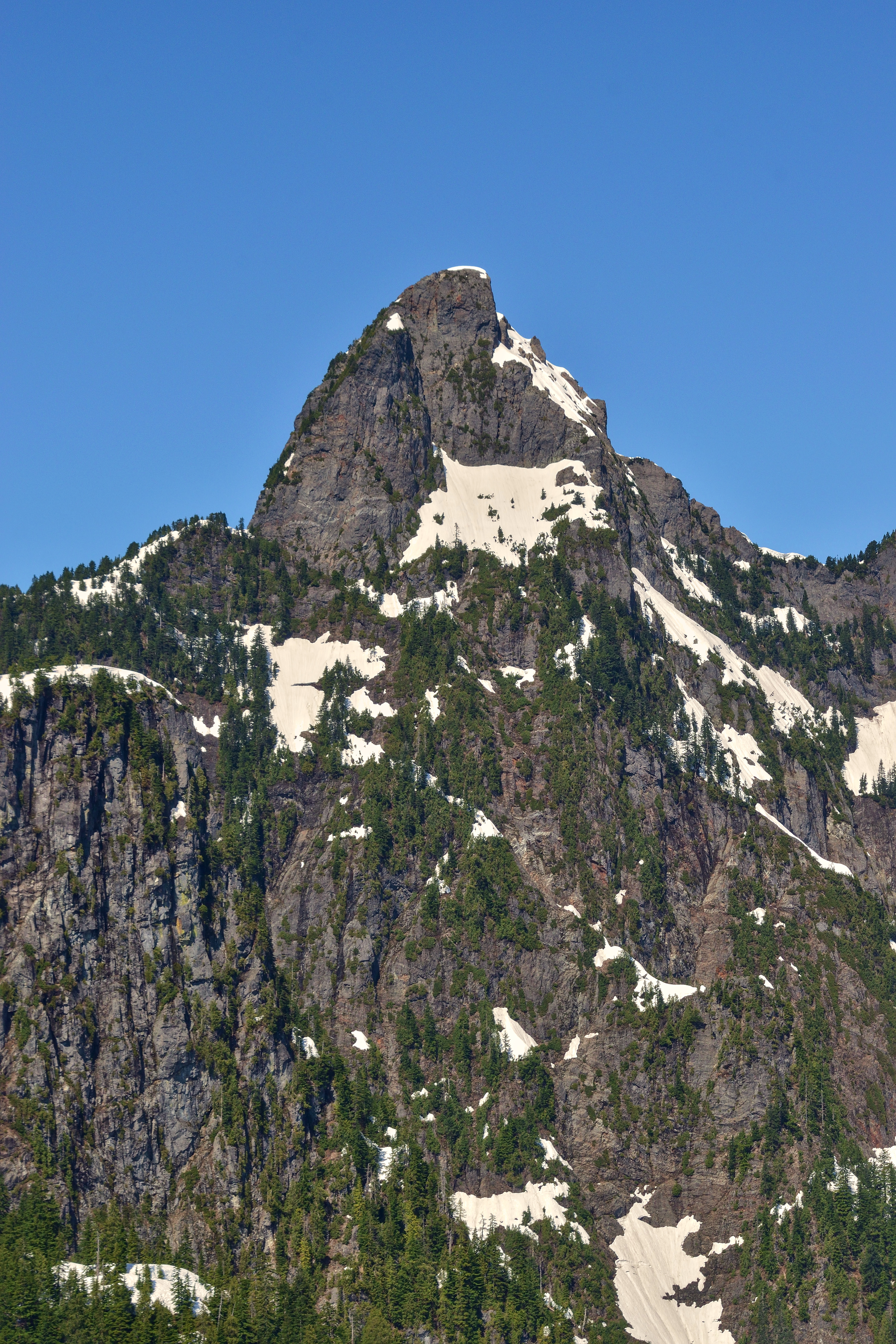
Blanshard viewed from Evans Peak

== See also ==
- Golden Ears Group
- Golden Ears (mountain)
- Edge Peak
