= Mount Crickmer =

Mountain in British Columbia, Canada

- Location within British Columbia
- Interactive map of Mount Crickmer

Highest point
- Elevation: 1,359 m (4,459 ft)
- Prominence: 1,049 m (3,442 ft)
- Coordinates: 49°19′14″N 122°22′37″W

Geography
- Location: B.C., Canada
- District: New Westminster Land District
- Parent range: Garibaldi Ranges
- Topo map: NTS 92G8 Stave Lake

Mount Crickmer is one of the southernmost summits of the Garibaldi Ranges of the Coast Mountains, overlooking the Central Fraser Valley in the Lower Mainland of British Columbia, Canada. Forming a rocky knoll at the northern end of a relatively flat-topped southeast–northwest axis ridge named Blue Mountain, which divides the basin of Alouette Lake, which lies immediately below it to the west, and the valley of the Stave River; Stave Lake is immediately at its eastern foot. A northerly ridge towards Mount Robie Reid, the next summit northwards, forms a col at Florence and Morgan Lakes low enough to give Crickmer a considerable prominence of 1049m. Beneath that col there is a diversion tunnel feeding the waters of Alouette Lake to the Alouette Powerhouse on Stave Lake.

Crickmer is the highest point in the City of Mission and was named on April 1, 1957 for the Reverend William Burton Crickmer, the first rector of the Church of St. John the Divine, at Derby (Old Fort Langley) in 1859.
