= Snow bramble =

Snow bramble or snowy bramble is a common name for several plants and may refer to:

- Rubus deliciosus, Boulder raspberry, sometimes called snowy bramble
- Rubus nivalis, native to northwestern North America
- Rubus parviflorus, native to northern North America
