= Mount Robie Reid =

Mountain in British Columbia, Canada

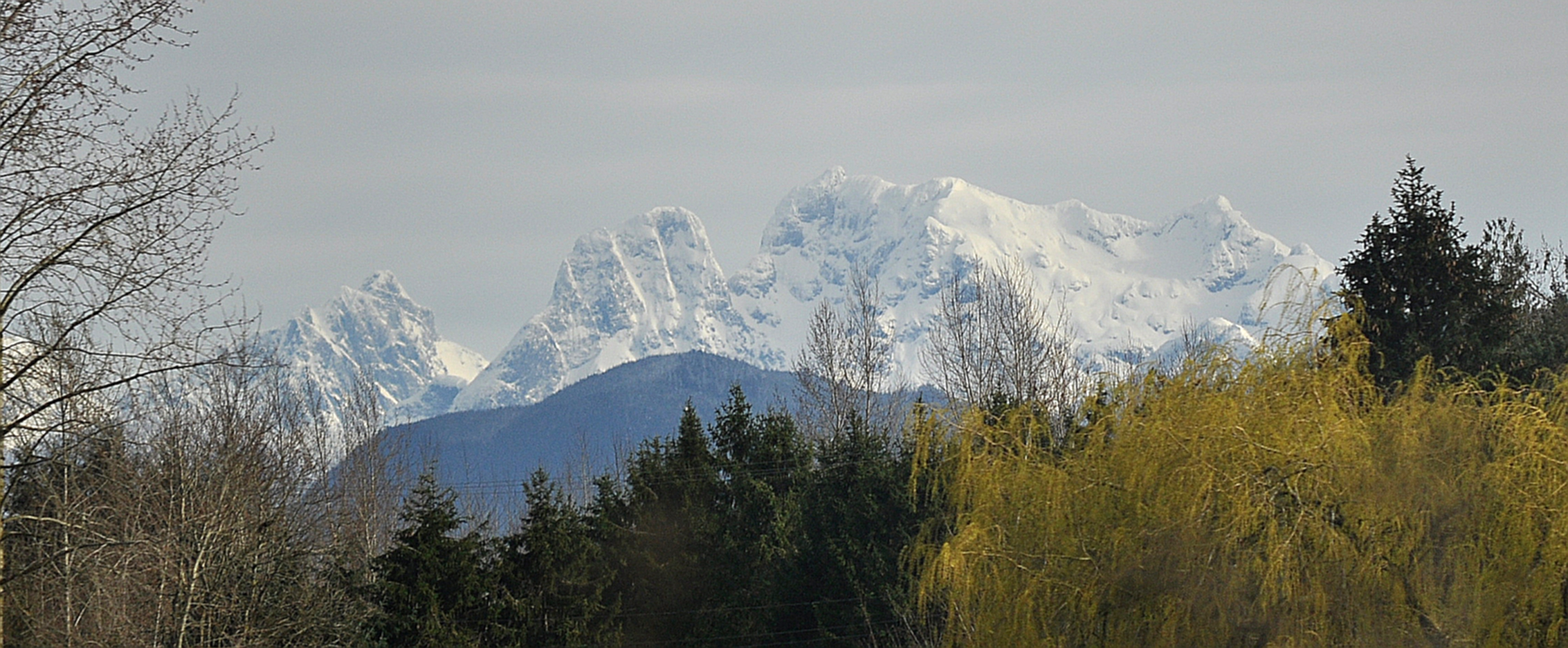
- Mount Robie Reid from Langley

Highest point
- Elevation: 2,095 m (6,873 ft)
- Prominence: 1,253 m (4,111 ft)
- Coordinates: 49°25′55″N 122°21′22″W

Geography
- Location within British Columbia
- Location: British Columbia, Canada
- District: New Westminster Land District
- Parent range: Garibaldi Ranges
- Topo map: NTS 92G8 Stave Lake

Mount Robie Reid 2,095 m (6,873 ft) is a mountain in the eastern part of Golden Ears Provincial Park in the southern end of the Garibaldi Ranges overlooking the Lower Mainland region of British Columbia, Canada. It lies to the north of Mission, British Columbia and on the west side of the upper end of Stave Lake, and to the northeast of the group of summits known as the Golden Ears. Mount Judge Howay is to the north. Robie Reid has a prominence of 1,245 m (4,085 ft) relative to the lowest col between the valleys of Tingle and Osprey Creeks (Osprey Creek is a tributary to the Pitt River drainage).

Together with Mount Judge Howay, which lies northeast across the deep valley of Tingle Creek, it was known as one of the Snow Peaks, and until its renaming in 1944 was referred to by old-timers as Old Baldy. Its name commemorates Robie Lewis Reid, a noted historian and educator whose colleague Frederic W. Howay is commemorated by Mount Judge Howay. Although relatively low, views of it dominate the mountain skyline from western Abbotsford and is also visible from Maple Ridge, North Surrey and New Westminster-Coquitlam, though from most of Mission it is invisible due to intervening smaller mountains and hill country.
