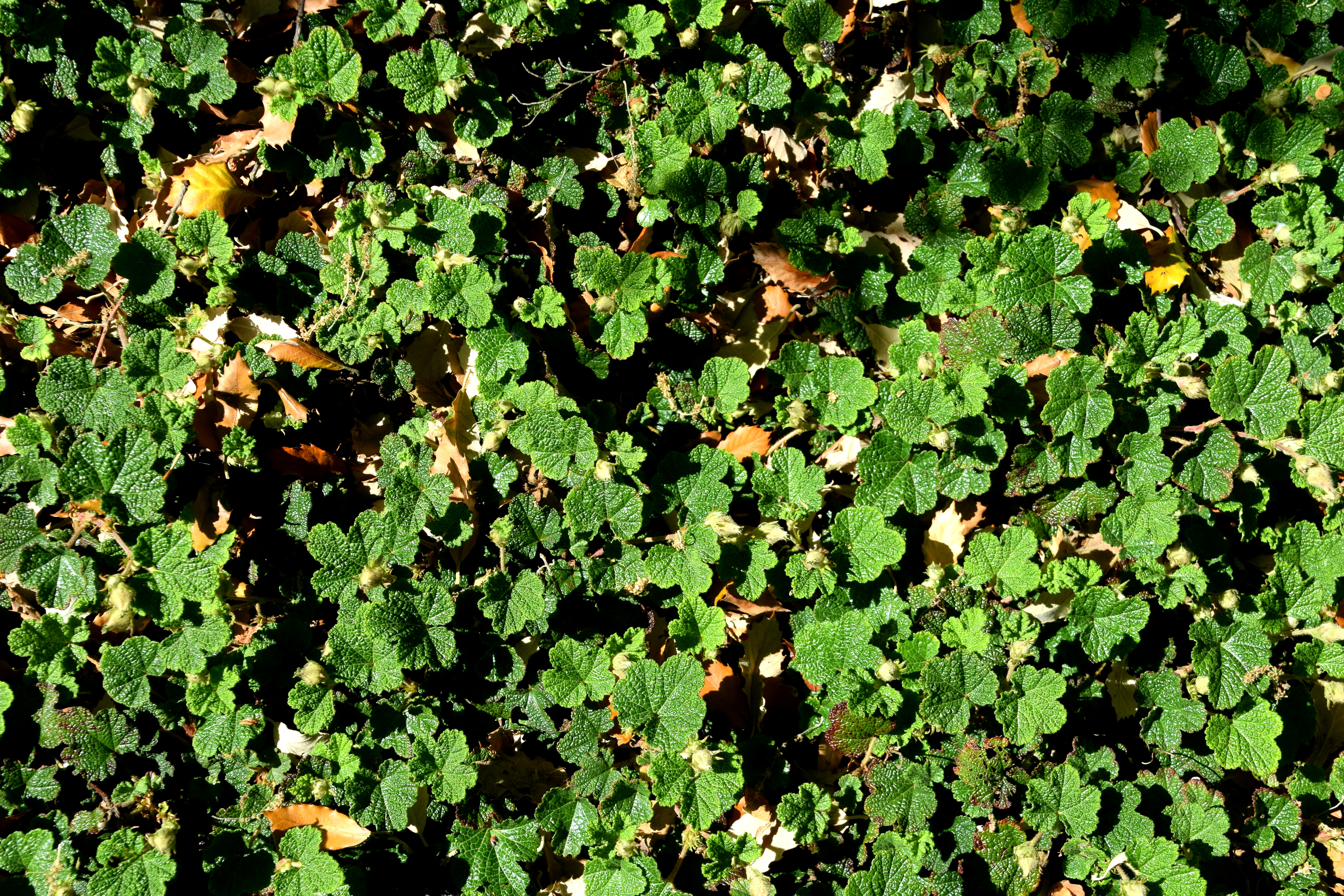

Scientific classification
- Kingdom: Plantae
- Clade: Embryophytes
- Clade: Tracheophytes
- Clade: Angiosperms
- Clade: Eudicots
- Clade: Rosids
- Order: Rosales
- Family: Rosaceae
- Genus: Rubus
- Species: R. rolfei

Binomial name
- Rubus rolfei S.Vidal

Synonyms
- Rubus alceifolius Vidal; Rubus calycinoides Hayata; Rubus calycinoides Hayata ex Koidz.; Rubus calycinoides subsp. macrophyllus H.L.Li; Rubus calycinoides var. macrophyllus H.L.Li; Rubus elmeri Focke; Rubus hayata-koidzumii Naruh.; Rubus pentalobus Hayata; Rubus rolfei subsp. lanatus Hayata; Rubus rolfei var. lanatus Hayata

= Rubus rolfei =

Species of flowering plant

Rubus rolfei, known as creeping raspberry, crinkle-leaf creeper, or Taiwanese creeping bramble, is a low-growing species of bramble. It is native to Taiwan and common in the horticultural trade.

== Description ==
White flowers are borne in early summer, followed by aggregate fruits. Creeping raspberry fruits are similar in appearance to blackberries or red raspberries, but differ in that their color is yellow to orangish-red.

== Taxonomy ==
The names Rubus pentalobus, R. hayata-koidzumii and R. calycinoides are considered taxonomic synonyms of Rubus rolfei. Rubus calycinoides, as described by Otto Kuntze, is a distinct species.

== Distribution and habitat ==
The species is originally from Taiwan, where it grows at high elevations.

== Uses ==
Plants are sometimes used to form a low growing, non-invasive, semi-evergreen to evergreen groundcover. Cultivars such as 'Emerald Carpet' are common in the plant trade.

The fruits are edible.
