= Crickmer, West Virginia =

Unincorporated community in West Virginia, United States

- Unincorporated community
- Location within West Virginia Location within the United States
- Coordinates: 37°53′30″N 80°54′22″W
- Country: United States
- State: West Virginia
- County: Fayette
- Elevation: 2,992 ft (912 m)
- Time zone: UTC-5 (Eastern (EST))
  - Summer (DST): UTC-4 (EDT)
- GNIS ID: 1537821

Crickmer is an unincorporated community in Fayette County, West Virginia, United States.

The community has the name of Ed Crickmer.
