= Golden Ears Group =

Mountainous area of British Columbia, Canada

Coordinates: 49°21′46″N 122°30′27″W

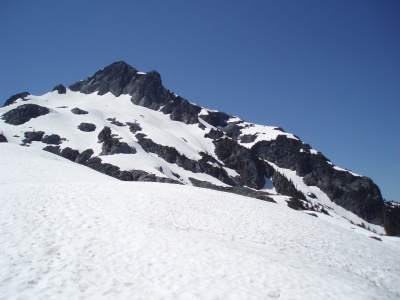
Golden Ears viewed while climbing

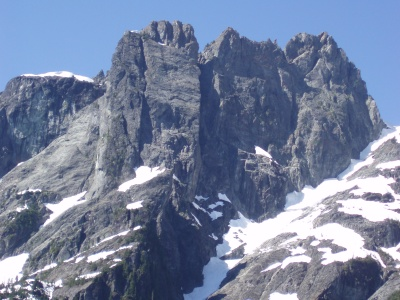
Edge Peak from the north

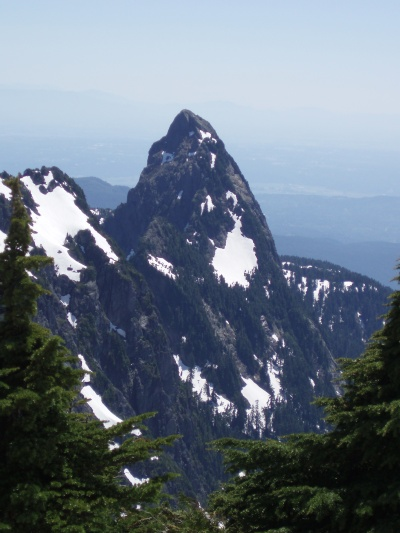
Blanshard Peak from near the summit of Golden Ears

The Golden Ears is the name used by the Bivouac Mountain Encyclopedia for a group of mountains in the southern portion of Golden Ears Provincial Park, and visible to most of the Lower Mainland of British Columbia. It is a part of the Garibaldi Ranges, and is located in Golden Ears Provincial Park.

Historically there has been confusion regarding the name of the area. Originally, the massif was referred to as The Golden Eyries, which became corrupted to Golden Ears in reference to the pointy ears-like shape of the double summit of the mountain now named Golden Ears. Although already known as the Golden Ears, the mountain was dubbed Mount Blanshard by Lieut. Richard Charles Mayne in 1859, in honour of the first governor of the colony of Vancouver Island.

Some time after this, the peaks in the area were conferred their existing names:

- Golden Ears 1,716 m (5,630 ft), the twin summit
- Edge Peak 1,680 m (5,512 ft), a large blocky summit in the center of the group, named for Sam Edge who climbed it in 1876
- Blanshard Peak 1,550 m (5,085 ft), the dramatic peak at the southernmost end of the group, also known as The Blanshard Needle

== See also ==
- Golden Ears
- Edge Peak
- Blanshard Peak
- Golden Ears Provincial Park
