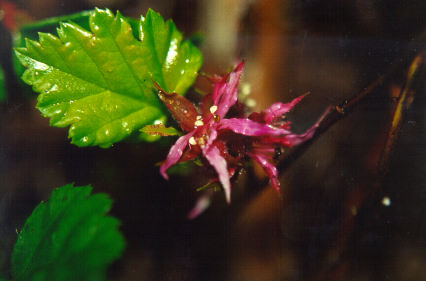

Scientific classification
- Kingdom: Plantae
- Clade: Embryophytes
- Clade: Tracheophytes
- Clade: Spermatophytes
- Clade: Angiosperms
- Clade: Eudicots
- Clade: Rosids
- Order: Rosales
- Family: Rosaceae
- Genus: Rubus
- Subgenus: Rubus subg. Chamaebatus
- Species: R. nivalis

Binomial name
- Rubus nivalis Douglas ex Hook. 1832

Synonyms
- Cardiobatus nivalis (Douglas ex Hook.) Greene

= Rubus nivalis =

Berry and plant

Rubus nivalis, commonly known as snow raspberry, is a North American species of bramble.

== Description ==
Rubus nivalis is a small, prickly shrub up to 15 centimetres (6 inches) tall, with stems creeping along the ground. The leaves are evergreen, 6.5 cm (2 1/2 in) long, either simple or with three lobes, rarely divided into three leaflets.

Blooming from June to September, the flowers are pink or magenta, with five petals. The fruit is a red berry with 3–10 drupelets.

== Distribution and habitat ==
The species is native to northwestern North America. It can be found in British Columbia, Washington, Idaho, Oregon, and far northern California. It grows in shaded forests and moist soil.

== Uses ==
The berry is edible.
