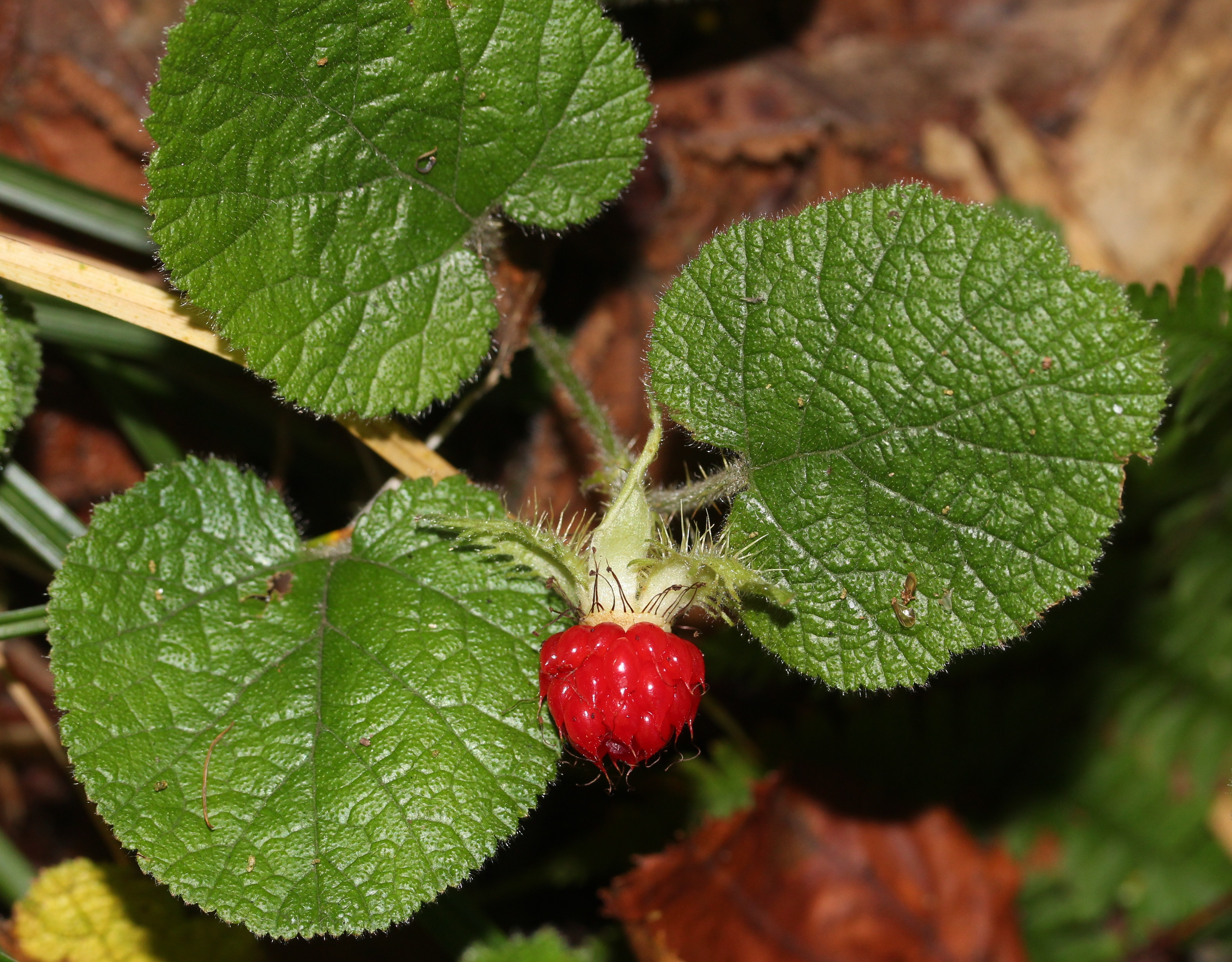

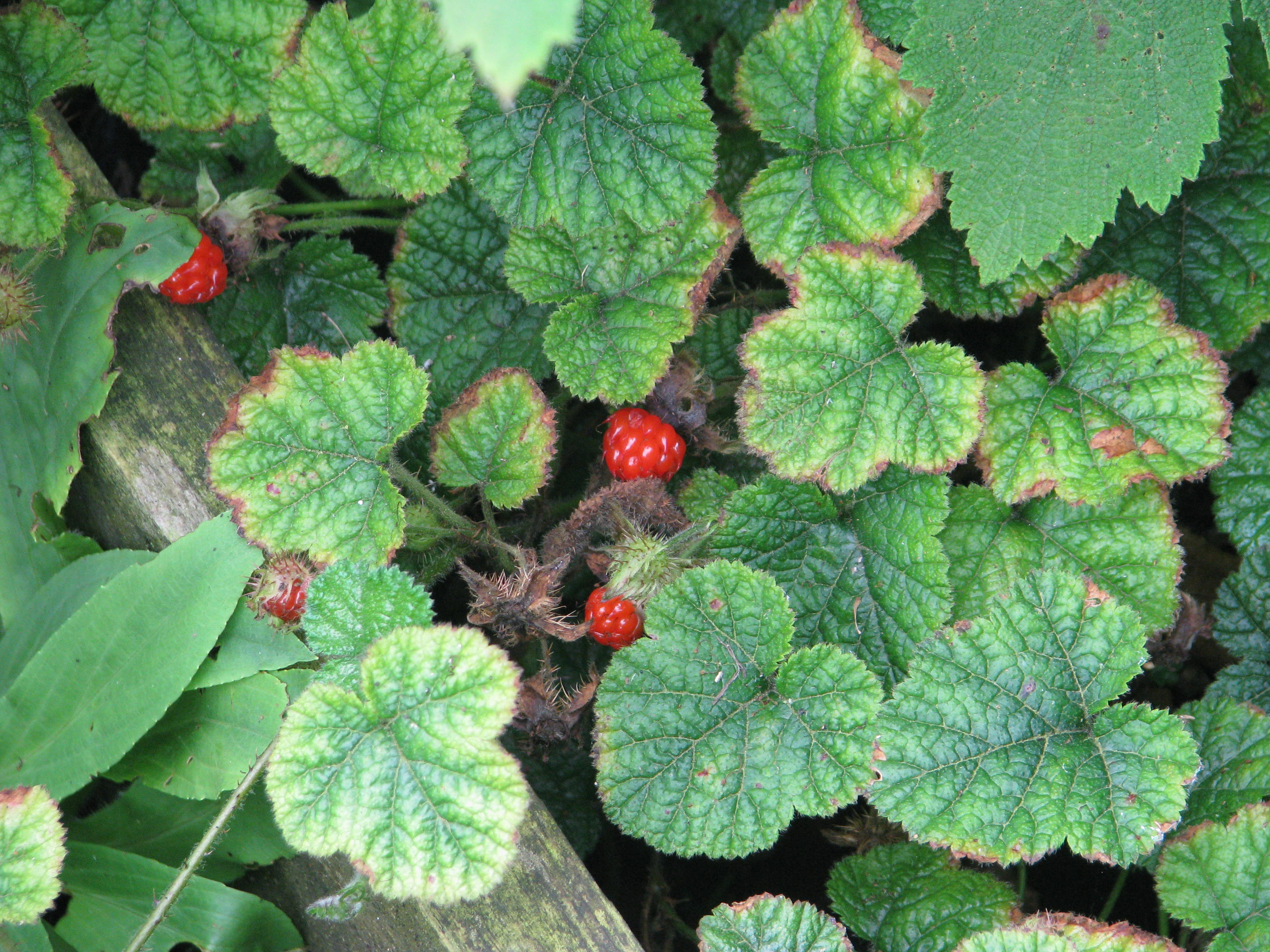

Scientific classification
- Kingdom: Plantae
- Clade: Embryophytes
- Clade: Tracheophytes
- Clade: Angiosperms
- Clade: Eudicots
- Clade: Rosids
- Order: Rosales
- Family: Rosaceae
- Genus: Rubus
- Species: R. pectinellus

Binomial name
- Rubus pectinellus Maxim.

= Rubus pectinellus =

Species of fruit and plant

Rubus pectinellus, commonly known as atibulnak, is an Asian species of bramble.

== Description ==
Atibulnak is a small trailing woody shrub, usually around 0.5 to 1 metre (1 1/2 to 3 1/2 feet) long. Both the stems and leaves are covered with small spines. The leaves are either heart-shaped or with three lobes and have a rough and hairy texture with serrated margins. The leaves are around 3 to 6 centimetres (1 1/4 to 2 1/4 inches) across. They are borne alternate on the stems.

It has white flowers around 2 cm (3/4 in) across. These bear fruits around 1.4 to 1.6 cm (1/2 to 5/8 in) in diameter which turn bright red when ripe.

== Distribution and habitat ==
The species is native to Japan, southern China, Taiwan, and the Philippines. It usually grows in forests and valleys at elevations of 700 to 3,000 m (2,300 to 9,800 ft).

== Uses ==
The fruits are edible, either raw or cooked, and have a pleasant subacid flavor. The leaves are also eaten as a vegetable in the Philippines.
