= Golden Ears (peaks) =

Mountains in British Columbia, Canada

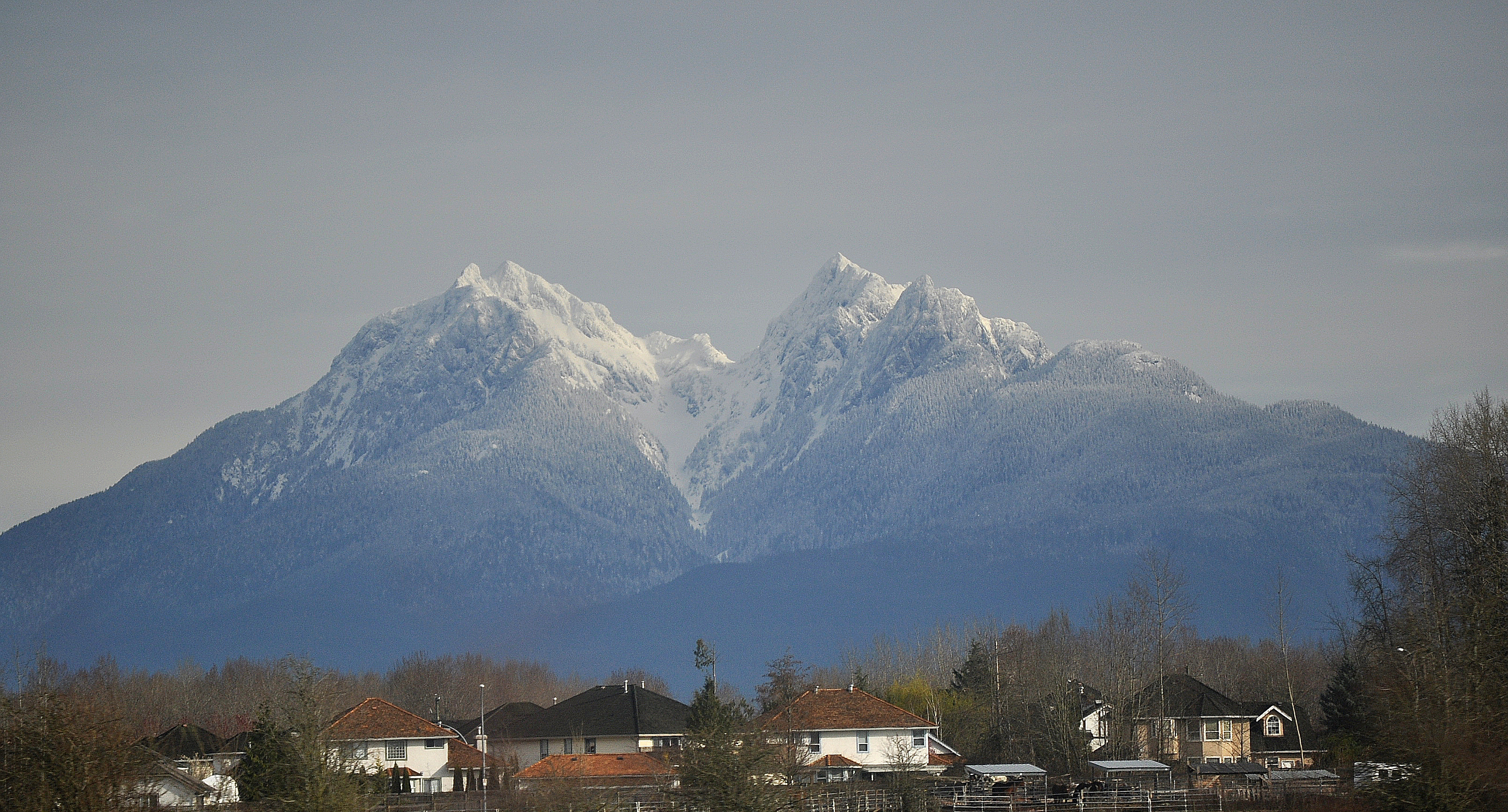

Highest point
- Elevation: 1,716 m (5,630 ft)
- Prominence: 1,002 m (3,287 ft)
- Coordinates: 49°21′46″N 122°30′27″W

Geography
- Location within British Columbia
- Interactive map of Golden Ears
- Location: British Columbia, Canada
- District: New Westminster Land District
- Parent range: Garibaldi Ranges
- Topo map: NTC 92G7 Port Coquitlam

Climbing
- First ascent: 1911 BCMC Party
- Easiest route: Scrambling. There is a trail that runs from the West Canyon Parking Lot up to the peak. The trail is difficult, and there is a walk-in campground about half-way up, and an emergency shelter on Panorama Ridge, near the highest peak.

Golden Ears is the name of the double summit that lies north of Maple Ridge, British Columbia and is visible from most of the western Lower Mainland. The mountain is in Golden Ears Provincial Park, and was originally referred to as Golden Eyries, possibly for golden eagles that were observed near the summit. There is confusion about the name, because of the twin summits the peak exhibits. Many people believe that the mountain is named because it looks like ears which become golden in the sunset light.

== Naming ==
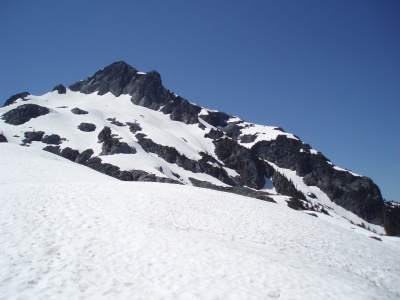
View while ascending Golden Ears.

The area encompassing Golden Ears, Edge Peak and Blanshard Peak (Blanshard Needle) was originally called The Golden Eyries, and the name was corrupted to Golden Ears. The similarity of the 1,716 m (5,630 ft) peak of the double summit to cat ears led people to believe that this mountain had the name Golden Ears. In the 1930s or 1940s the government of the day renamed the entire area to Mount Blanshard, and gave Edge Peak its name, named the southernmost summit Blanshard Peak, and conferred the official name Golden Ears to the 1,716 m (5,630 ft) peak with the twin summit.

Current editions of the NTC map 92G/07 and 92G/08 have the label Mount Blanchard since the Golden Ears group lies on the border between these two maps. People in the Lower Mainland have always referred to the area, the park and the peak as Golden Ears.

== See also ==
- Golden Ears Group
- Golden Ears Provincial Park
