= Frederic William Howay =

Canadian historian, lawyer and jurist

- Born: November 25, 1867; London, Ontario, Canada
- Died: October 4, 1943 (aged 75); New Westminster, British Columbia, Canada
- Known for: Historian

Frederic William Howay FRSC (November 25, 1867 – October 4, 1943), also spelled Frederick, was a Canadian historian, lawyer, and jurist.

== Biography ==
Born in London, Ontario, Howay moved to British Columbia as a child. After attending school in New Westminster, Howay wrote his Provincial Teachers' exam in 1884 in Victoria, British Columbia. He spent three years teaching at schools in Canoe Pass and Boundary Bay. In 1887, he studied law at Dalhousie University and received a Bachelor of Law degree in 1890. He was called to the British Columbia bar in 1891. In 1907, he was appointed a Judge of County Court of New Westminster. He retired in 1937.

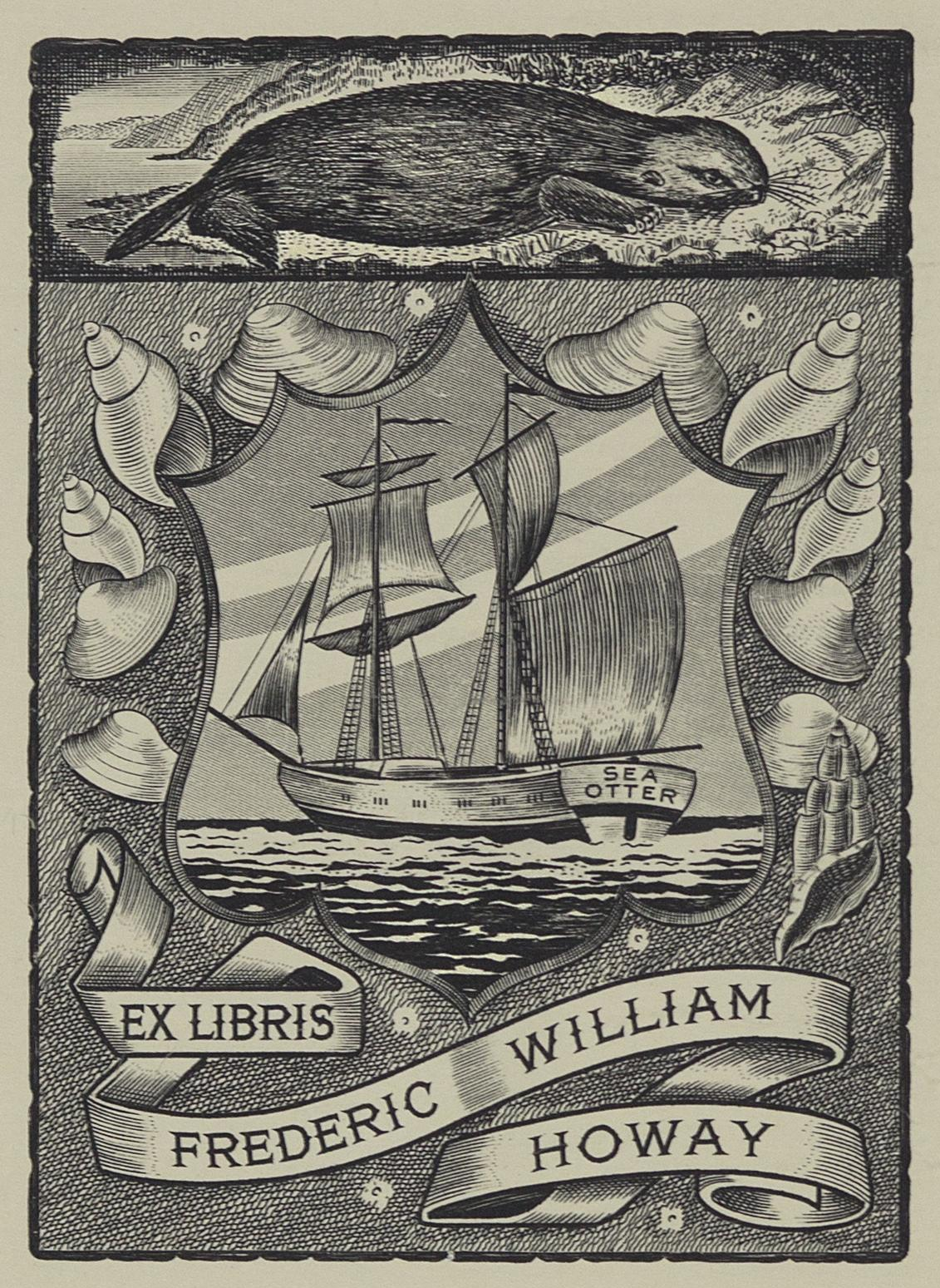
Bookplate circa 1925

In 1933, he was awarded the Royal Society of Canada's J. B. Tyrrell Historical Medal. He was a Fellow of the Royal Society of Canada, the Royal Geographical Society and the Royal Historical Society. In 1932, he was elected to the American Antiquarian Society. From 1922 to 1926, he was president of the British Columbia Historical Federation. From 1941 to 1942, he was president of the Royal Society of Canada. He also served as a member of the Historic Sites and Monuments Board of Canada, briefly serving as its interim chairman.

In 1933, he was awarded an honorary Doctor of Laws from the University of British Columbia. Mount Judge Howay, north of Stave Lake, is named in his honour.

He died in 1943 in New Westminster, British Columbia.

== Selected works ==
- British Columbia from the Earliest Times to the Present, Vol 1 with Ethelbert Olaf Stuart Scholefield (S.J. Clarke, 1913)
- British Columbia from the Earliest Times to the Present, Vol 2 with Ethelbert Olaf Stuart Scholefield (S.J. Clarke, 1913)
- British Columbia from the Earliest Times to the Present, Vol 3 (Biographical) with Ethelbert Olaf Stuart Scholefield (S.J. Clarke, 1913)
- British Columbia from the Earliest Times to the Present, Vol 4 (Biographical) with Ethelbert Olaf Stuart Scholefield (S.J. Clarke, 1913)
- The Early History of the Fraser River Mines (C.F. Banfield, 1926)
- British Columbia: The Making of a Province (The Ryerson press, 1928)
- Builders of the West: A Book of Heroes (Ryerson Press, 1929)
- The Hawaiian Islands with Frank Alfred Golder and George Verne Blue (Captain Cook Sesquicentennial Commission, 1930)
- Captain George Vancouver (Ryerson Press, 1932)
- The voyage of the New Hazard to the Northwest coast, Hawaii and China, 1810-1813 with Stephen Reynolds (Peabody museum, 1938)
- British Columbia and the United States with Henry Forbes Angus and Walter Noble Sage(The Ryerson Press, 1942)
- The journal of Captain James Colnett aboard the Argonaut from April 26, 1789 to Nov. 3, 1791 (The Champlain Society, 1940)
- The Dixon-Meares Controversy (Da Capo Press, New York, N.Y. 1969)
- Early shipping in Burrand Inlet, 1863-1870 (s.n., s.l. 1937)

Professional and academic associations
Preceded by Robert Charles Wallace	President of the Royal Society of Canada; 1941–1942	Succeeded by James Collip
