= Golden Ears Provincial Park =

Provincial park in British Columbia, Canada

- IUCN category II (national park)
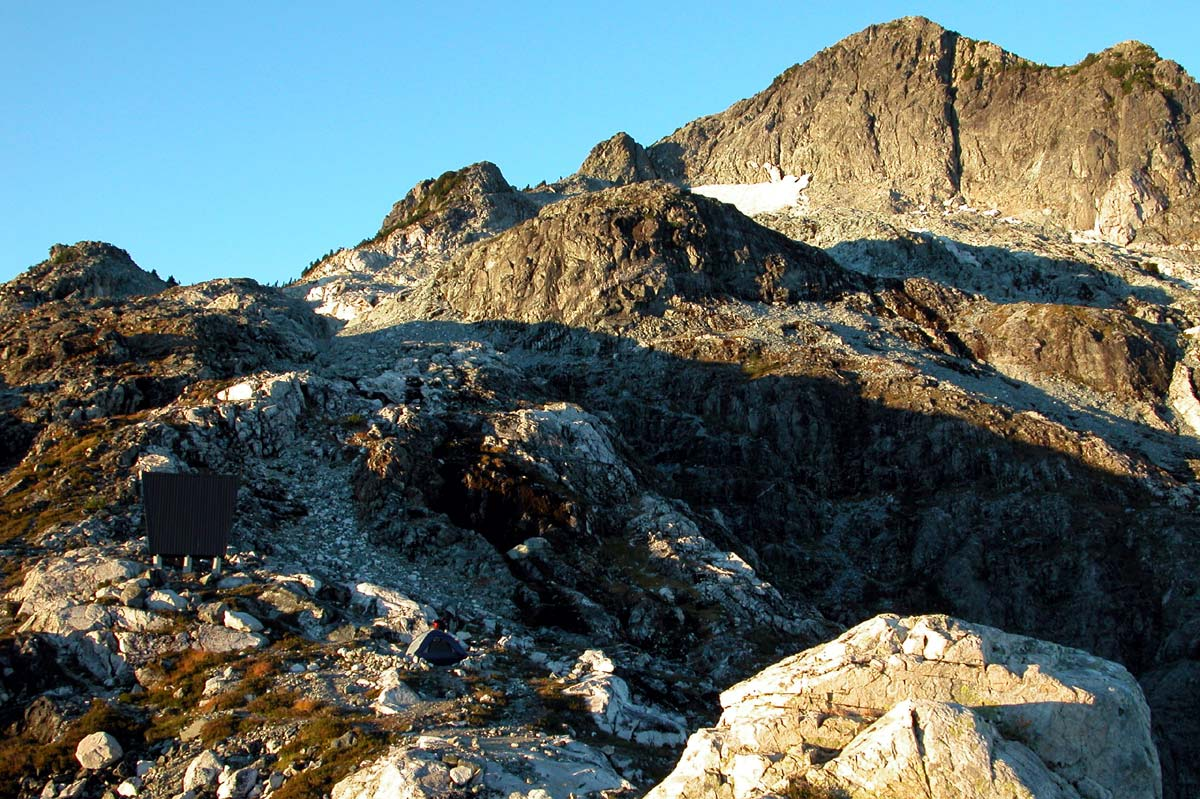
- Golden Ears Summit

- Location within British Columbia Location within Fraser Valley Regional District
- Interactive map of Golden Ears Provincial Park
- Location: Lower Mainland, British Columbia, Canada
- Nearest city: Maple Ridge
- Coordinates: 49°28′0″N 122°27′0″W
- Area: 609 km^{2} (235 sq mi)
- Established: 1967
- Visitors: 956,515 (in 2017-18)
- Governing body: BC Parks
- Website: bcparks.ca/golden-ears-park/

Golden Ears Provincial Park is a 555.9 square kilometres (214.6 sq mi) provincial park in British Columbia, Canada. It is named after the prominent twin peaks, which are commonly referred to as Golden Ears (Mount Blanshard) (elevation: 1,716 metres (5,630 ft)). The park was originally part of Garibaldi Provincial Park (established 1927) and was split off as a separate park in 1967. The area was logged extensively in the 1920s by the Lougheed and Abernathy Logging Company. Golden Ears Provincial Park is a protected area that contains many endangered species of flora and fauna.

== First Nations territory ==
The area encompassed by Golden Ears Provincial Park sits within the traditional territory of the Coast Salish people. The following is a list of First Nations whose traditional territories include all or part of Golden Ears Provincial Park.

- Katzie First Nation
- Kwantlen First Nation
- Matsqui First Nation
- Sts'Ailes people
- Tsawwassen First Nation
- Stó꞉lō Nation
- In-SHUCK-ch Nation
- St’at’imc/Lillooet Tribal Council

=== Traditional use ===
Historically, the area enclosed by the boundaries of Golden Ears Provincial Park provided an important source of sustenance and resources for the local First Nations. The Katzie First Nation traditionally used the areas in what are now the southern and western sections of the park for hunting and fishing. Several sites of cultural importance to the Katzie First Nation are also enclosed within the boundaries of the park. The St’at’imc/Lillooet people traditionally used the northern area of what is now Golden Ears Park as a trade corridor. The Kwantlen First Nation traditionally used what is now the southeastern portion of the park for hunting and trapping.

Some examples of animals that were traditionally hunted by the local First Nations include mule deer, Roosevelt elk, mountain goat, black bear, North American beaver, and American marten. Archeological studies of the area indicate that fishing around Alouette Lake has been taking place for several thousand years. Fish that were historically harvested in Alouette Lake and Alouette River include five different species of Pacific salmon, steelhead, sturgeon, and trout. Many species of plants were historically gathered in the area, including but not limited to cedar bark, Wapato (Sagittaria latifolia), cranberries, and other types of berries.

=== Current use ===
The local First Nations whose territory is included within the park have retained their rights to gather resources within the park boundaries. Hunting and trapping are only permitted for individuals who belong to one of the local Nations. The Katzie Cultural Education Society provides some educational programs at the Outdoor Learning Centre in the park.

=== First Nations involvement in management decisions ===
The Order in Council that created Golden Ears Provincial Park as a separate entity from Garibaldi Park makes no mention of First Nations involvement in this decision. BC Parks has made a commitment to include First Nations voices in the decision-making processes for management of Golden Ears Provincial Park. One core ideal outlined in the Golden Ears Park Management Plan is that the park must allow for the local First Nations to continue their traditional practices, such as hunting and gathering. Opportunities for park visitors to learn about First Nations culture relevant to the park area are also part of the core ideals of the Golden Ears Park Management Plan.

The Katzie First Nation has done significant work to ensure that their traditional territories are being managed according to their principles. The Katzie First Nation has been involved in efforts to bring spawning salmon to Alouette Lake, which was blocked by the creation of a dam on Alouette River in 1928; these efforts have been made in partnership with BC Hydro and the Alouette River Management Society. The Katzie First Nation has also been involved in a study of plant diversity and abundance in the Alouette Lake riparian zone.

== Industrial history ==
In 1897 a copper mine was developed along the east side Pitt Lake in Golden Ears Park. The mine title changed hands many times prior to closure during the Great Depression. Pitt Lake's lost gold mine is a legend of an Indigenous man named Slumach, who was aware of a large gold deposit in the park. The History Channel produced a show, Deadman's Curse, which aired in July 2022, documenting the search for the gold and research into Slumach.

Timber harvest in the 1920s by the Lougheed and Abernathy Logging Company was extensive and at one point the largest in North America. In 1929, a large forest fire consumed 60,000 hectares (150,000 acres) of forest and halted logging in the area. Most of the old growth cedar and hemlock was either logged or lost in the wildfire.

In 1926, BC Hydro constructed the Alouette Dam on Allouette Lake for power generation. The Alouette reservoir is connected to Stave Lake via a diversion tunnel.

== History and creation of Golden Ears Provincial Park ==
The Golden Ears Provincial Park was named after the twin peaks of Mount Blanshard. In 1933, the area that is now Golden Ears Park was incorporated into Garibaldi Provincial Park because of the scenic and recreational value of the area. Golden Ears Provincial Park is 62,539 hectares of protected area designated as separate from Garibaldi Provincial Park in 1967 primarily for the appreciation of the barrier between Golden Ears and Garibaldi areas. The creation of Golden Ears Provincial Park allowed more focus to be placed on the recreational elements available in the region surrounding Alouette Lake. The park is often used for hiking, horseback riding, and boating. The expansion of highways increased the accessibility of Golden Ears Provincial Park, which led to the rise in popularity of camping in the area.

== Golden Ears Park management plan ==
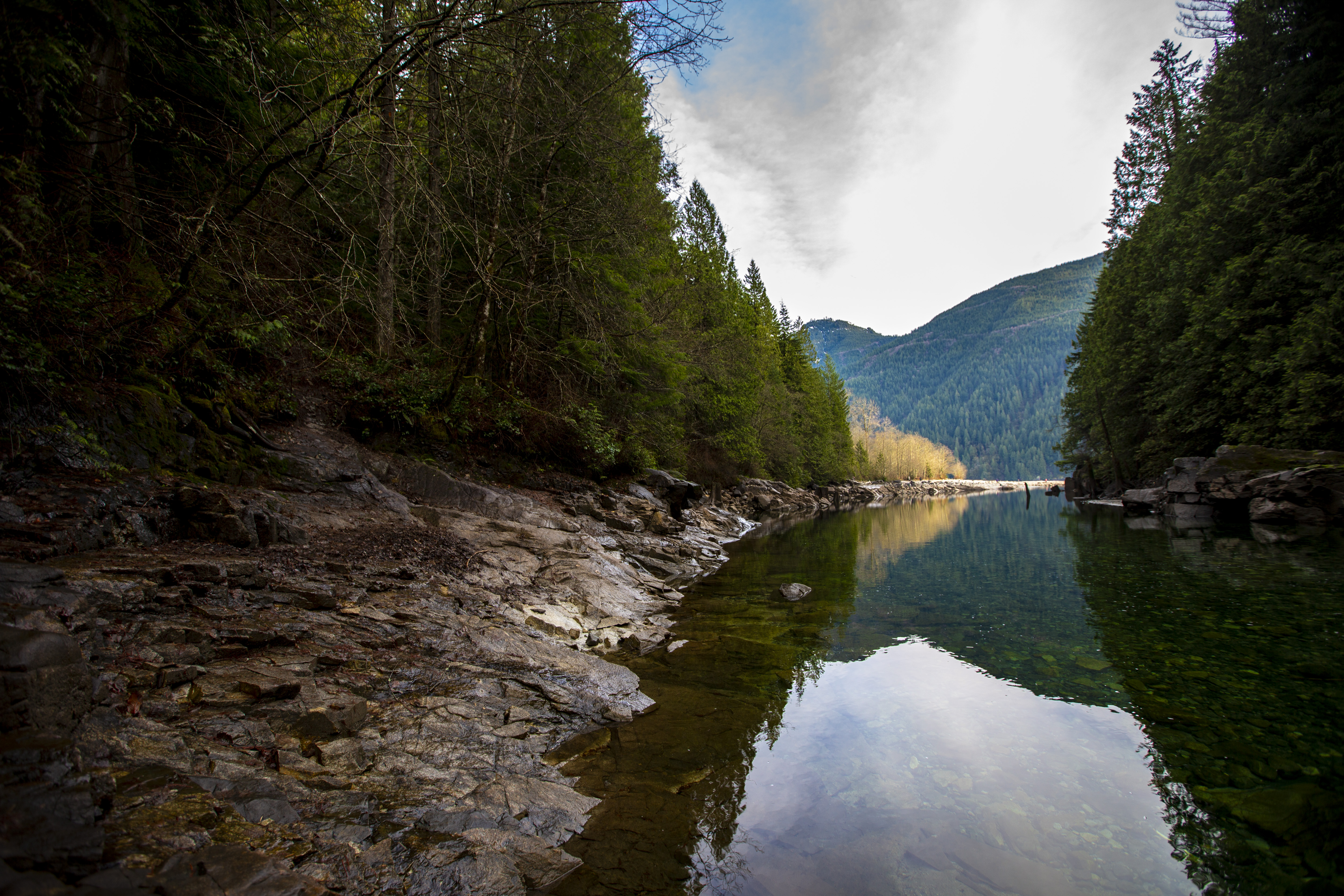
Golden Ears Provincial Park

=== Purpose and objectives ===
Golden Ears Park is one of the largest and most popular parks in British Columbia, attracting an average of 610,000 visitors every year. Following the park's heightened popularity and continued increase in foot traffic, the province of British Columbia enacted the official Golden Ears Park Management Plan in November of 2013, to preserve the natural beauty and ecological components of the park. The plan highlights the park's unique features and significant amenities, including its cultural, natural, and recreational values.

=== Protecting and maintaining wildlife populations ===
Ecological conservation initiatives have been put in place to preserve the park’s natural ecosystem and protect the wildlife that inhabit Golden Ears from the impacts of repeated recreational activity. Erosion is a common issue that the management plan addresses: erosion from hiking trails due to heavy foot traffic, and shoreline erosion caused by water sports and recreational boating. The province plans to collaborate with regulatory agencies to mitigate erosion concerns. There are also research plans in place to develop a deeper understanding of the park's wildlife populations, and supporting recovery initiatives for endangered species.

== Species at risk ==
Over 85 BC Red listed species have been documented in Golden Ears Park. Some Red listed species that may be found in Golden Ears Park are Actaea elata, spotted owl, monarch butterfly, and the sage thrasher. The aforementioned species are registered as endangered in Schedule 1 of the Species at Risk Act (SARA). Many other BC Red listed species can also be found in the park. The Government of British Columbia has documented 1824 Blue listed species in Golden Ears Park, such as grizzly bears. Western population grizzly bears are registered as a species of special concern in Schedule 1 of SARA.

== Vegetation in the park ==
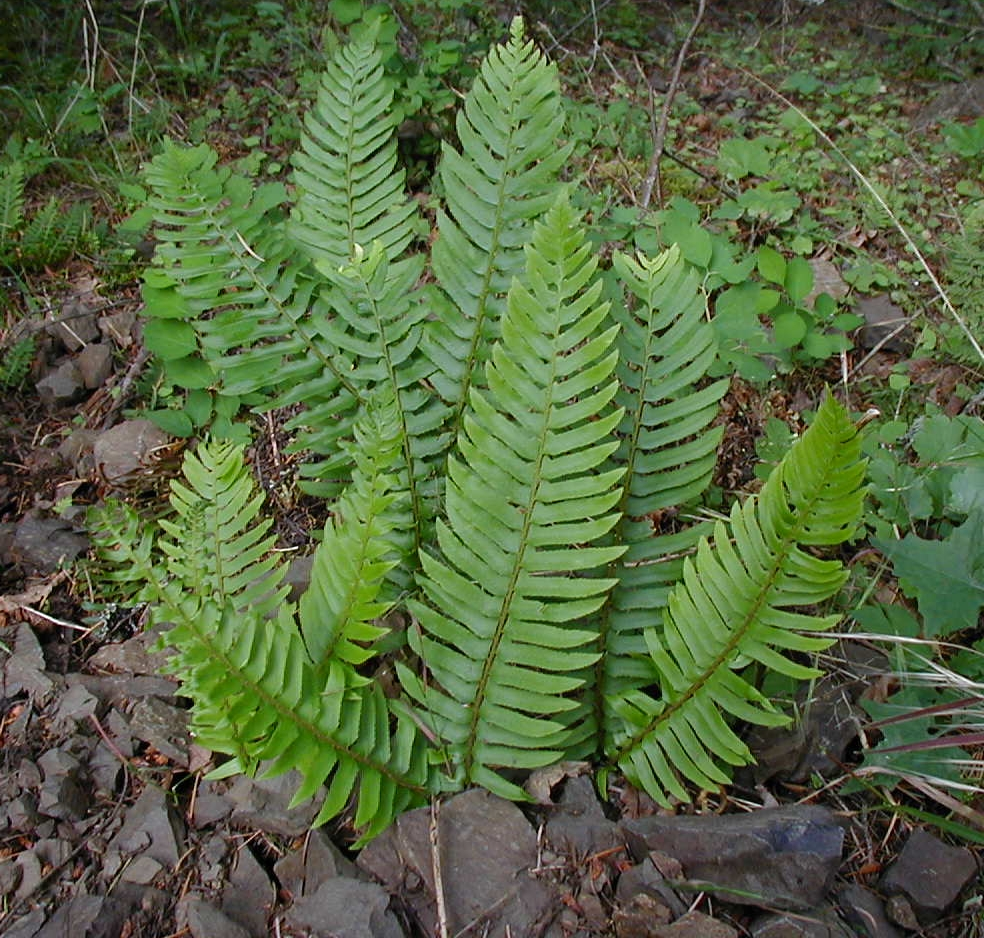
Western Sword Fern

Golden Ears Park is home to three eco-sections within its borders, Eastern Pacific Ranges, Southern Pacific Ranges, and the Fraser Lowlands. Within the three eco-sections lies a large diversity of plants, including ferns, trees, and wildflowers. Ferns often observed include the Western sword fern, leathery grape fern, American parsley fern, and the common bracken. Douglas fir are present in the higher elevations of Golden Ears Park. Other plant species that are often observed include the Himalayan blackberry, salmonberry, snow bramble, skunk cabbage, and knotweed.

=== Invasive species ===
The Himalayan blackberry and the knotweed family are both non-native species to British Columbia. Himalayan blackberry are known to grow over top of low-growing plants, and become very dense to the point of limiting the movement of other animals in the area. The Golden Ears Management Plan was to outline a vision for the future use(s) of the park, and explains in detail goals that BC Parks has for managing of the spread and preventing the introductions of invasive species in the 56,000-hectare park.

=== Endemic species ===
With the multitude of ecology management plans currently underway and efforts being made by many sectors of the public, native species of plants found in British Columbia are able to live, grow and regain previously strained population numbers within the protected areas of BC Parks such as Golden Ears. Golden Ears Provincial Park lends itself to being a protected area for many endemic species of trees in Canada. Sitka spruce, western white pine, Douglas fir, and mountain hemlock trees are all considered to be endemic to the Pacific Northwest, and are protected within the park boundary in order to preserve the habitat that these red and blue listed species live in.

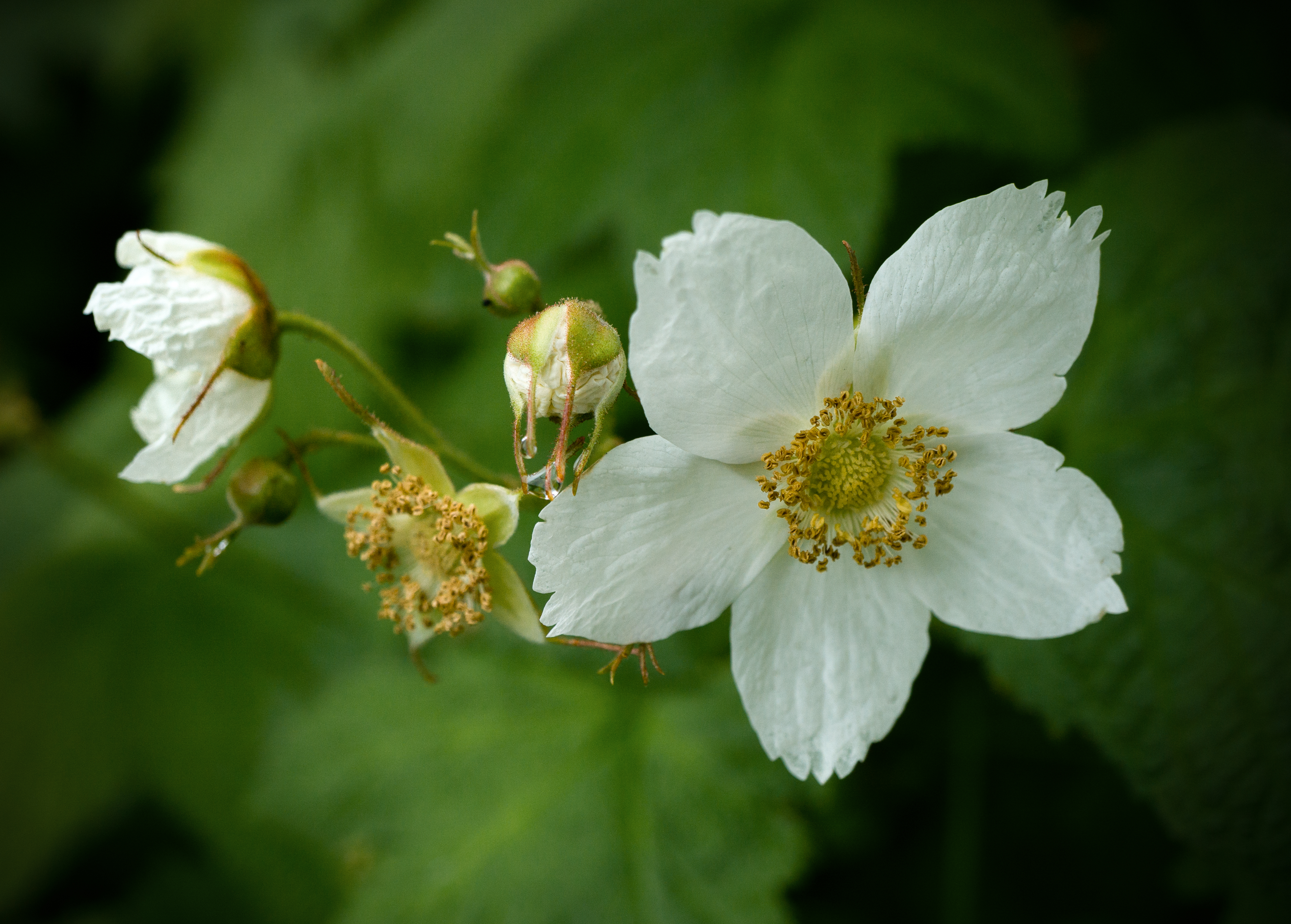
Snow bramble

Aside from the tree populations found within the park, there are many endangered plant species that are native to British Columbia that can be found thriving in Golden Ears Provincial Park, species such as coastal wood ferns, Menzies' Burnet, and snow bramble.

== Camping ==
There are three main campgrounds at Golden Ears Park, with a total capacity of 409 vehicle accessible campsites. There are also backcountry campsites available at the park, also known as "Walk-In/Wilderness Camping". These Campsites are available at Alder Flats on the West Canyon Trail and Panorama Ridge on the Golden Ears Trail, but no facilities are provided. Finally, there are three group campgrounds available for reservation, by any group booking a minimum of 15 adults, with a maximum total of 50 persons.

=== Alouette Campground ===
The Alouette campground is the largest of the three main campgrounds in the park, with 206 campsites.

=== Gold Creek Campground ===
Gold Creek campground is the second largest of the three main campgrounds in the park, with 148 campsites on it. Gold Creek is the only campground of the three that is open year-round. Amenities are restricted during the winter months.

=== North Beach Campground ===
North Beach campground is the smallest of the three main campgrounds in the park, with 55 campsites.

=== Walk-in/wilderness camping ===
Wilderness/walk-in camping is permitted at Alder Flats on the West Canyon Trail and Panorama Ridge on the Golden Ears Trail, with pit toilets at both sites.

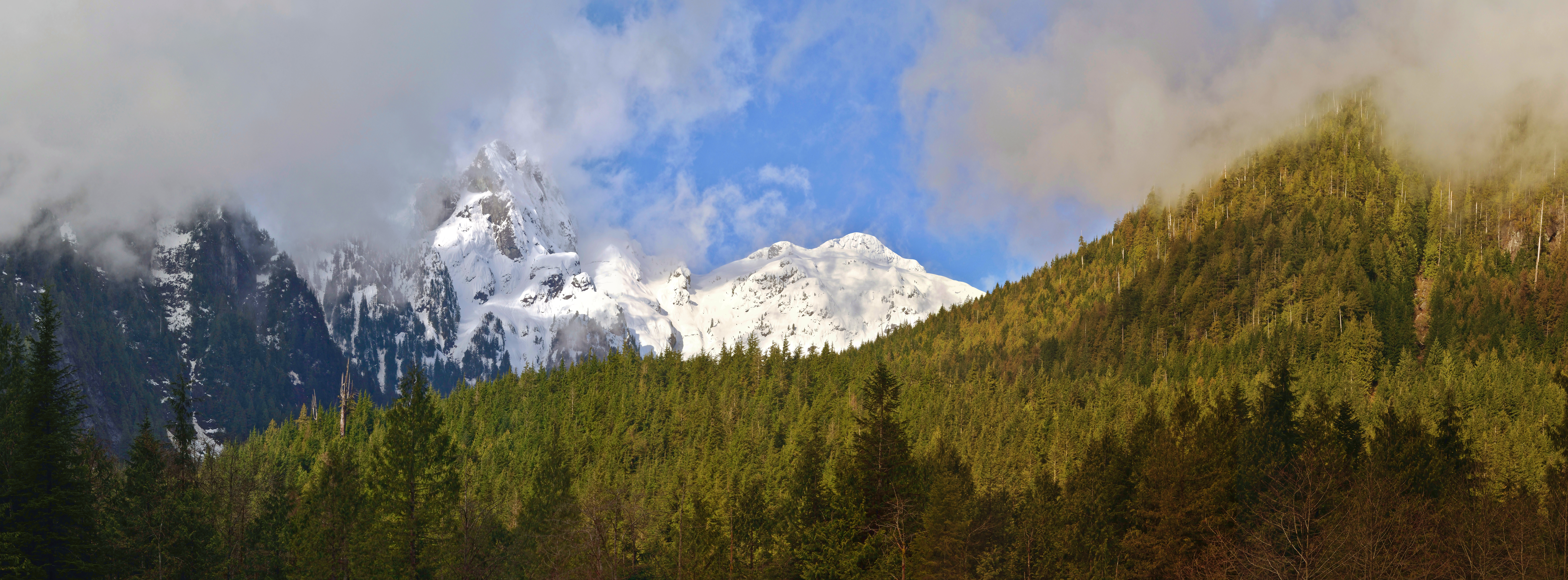
View of Golden Ears from Viewpoint Beach near Alder Flats

=== Rustic Marine Campsites ===
Rustic marine campsites are located on Alouette Lake at Moyer Creek, The Narrows and Alouette River (north end of the lake).

== Hiking ==
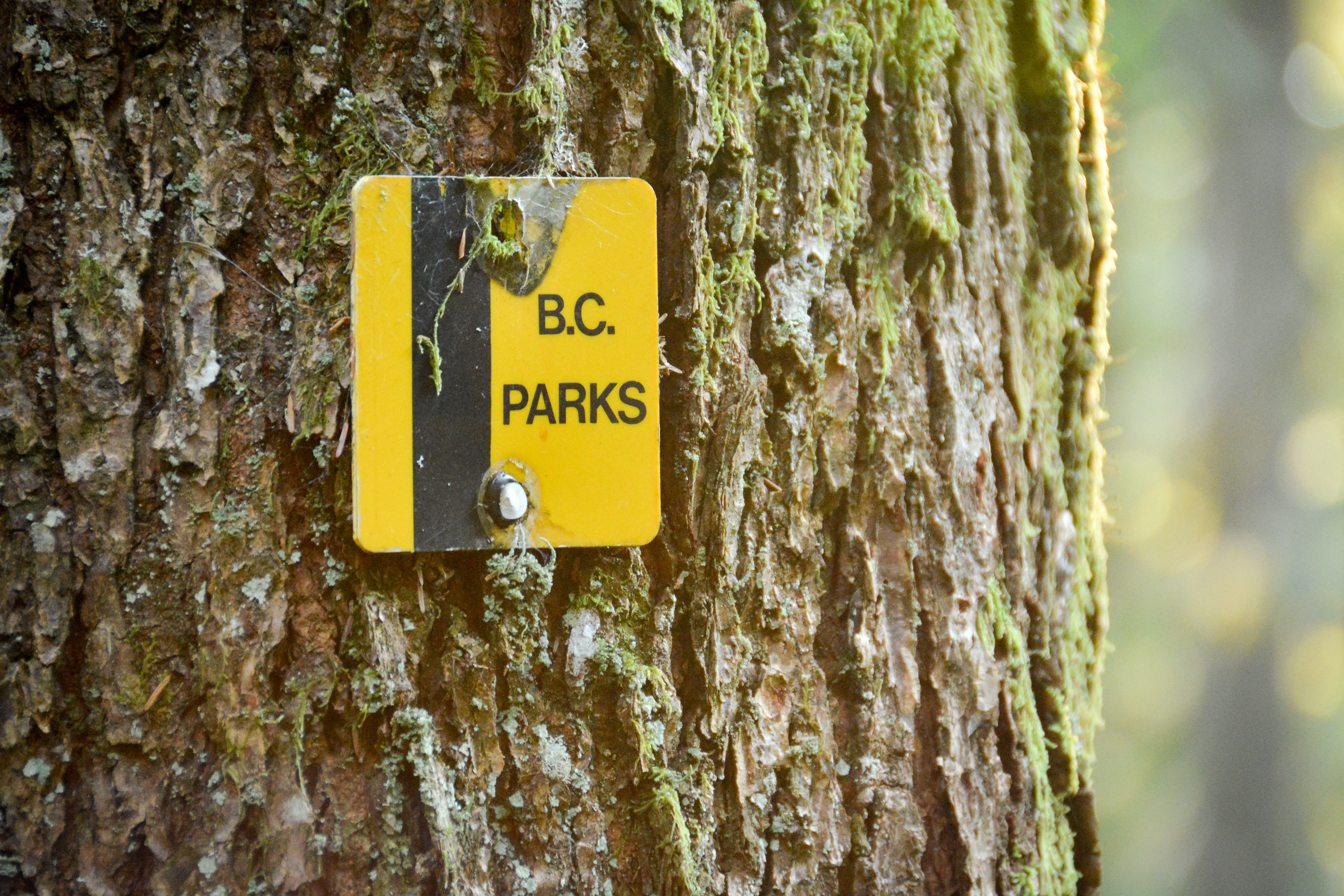
BC Parks trail marker in Golden Ears Provincial Park

There is an extensive network of hiking trails in the park ranging from short walks to strenuous backcountry trips.

=== Golden Ears Trail ===
This trail goes to the Northern summit of the Golden Ears massif.

== Climbing ==
There are two mountains accessible by official trails that require intermediate skills to reach the peaks.

== Horseback riding ==
There is an extensive network of over 20 kilometres (12 mi) of gravel/dirt horse trails in the park.

== Incidents ==
Some incidents have resulted in the injury to or death of park patrons.

For example, in July 2018, police received a call from BC Ambulance that a 21 year old man had been swept away by the current from Gold Creek in Golden Ears Provincial Park. A second man tried to help, and both were carried over the falls. The second man was found downstream with non-life-threatening injuries and was transported to hospital. Ridge Meadows Search and Rescue (RMSAR) was deployed, and though an initial search did not find the first man, when the search continued the following morning, a body was found and recovered.

The previous year, in April 2017, emergency services were called to Golden Ears Provincial Park after receiving a report of a man being swept away by swift water in Gold Creek.

In September 2015, Ridge Meadows RCMP were called to Alouette Lake in Golden Ears Provincial Park after a boat capsized on the lake. Four friends had experienced engine troubles with their 15-foot craft, and after pulling in to North Beach to check it out, were later swamped by a large wave. The boat took on water and sunk. Two of the boaters made it to shore and found campers at Gold Creek, while a third made it to shore and headed into the Alouette campground. The three survivors were treated for hypothermia, and released from a hospital a day later. Members of the Maple Ridge Fire Department, Ridge Meadows RCMP, British Columbia Ambulance Service, Ridge Meadows SAR, RCMP Air 1, British Columbia Ambulance Service's Air Ambulance searched for the fourth missing boater. The woman was never found and presumed deceased.

In July 2013, a 21-year-old man drowned in what appeared to have been a swimming accident in the park.

== Filming location ==
- The 2014 movie Dawn of the Planet of the Apes credits being shot in Golden Ears Provincial Park.
- The 2014 movie Godzilla shot a scene on North Beach in the park.
- The 2010 movie The Lightning Thief shot scenes in the park.
- The 2008 movie Twilight (starring Robert Pattinson and Kristen Stewart) shot some of its outdoor forest scenes in the park.
- The 1982 movie First Blood (starring Sylvester Stallone as Rambo) was shot in Golden Ears Provincial Park.
- Annanna & Kristina's Grocery Bag, a documentary shot a scene in the park.

== See also ==
- Golden Ears Bridge, a 6 laned bridge across the Fraser River, completed and open to traffic in June 2009.
