= List of Phacelia species =

List of Phacelia species. This plant genus is in the family Hydrophyllaceae, basal in one of the two main euasterid lineages.

This is a list of binomial names, including both accepted species and synonyms.

Source: Index Kewensis (at IPNI) and ITIS.

== A ==
- Phacelia acanthominthoides Elmer
- Phacelia acaulis Brand
- Phacelia adenophora Howell
- Phacelia adspersa Brand
- Phacelia affinis A.Gray
- Phacelia alba Rydb.
- Phacelia aldea R.Br. ex Sweet
- Phacelia alpina Rydb.
- Phacelia altotonga B.L.Turner
- Phacelia alvordensis M.E.Jones
- Phacelia amabilis Constance
- Phacelia ambigua M.E.Jones
- Phacelia anelsonii Macbride
- Phacelia arenicola Brandegee

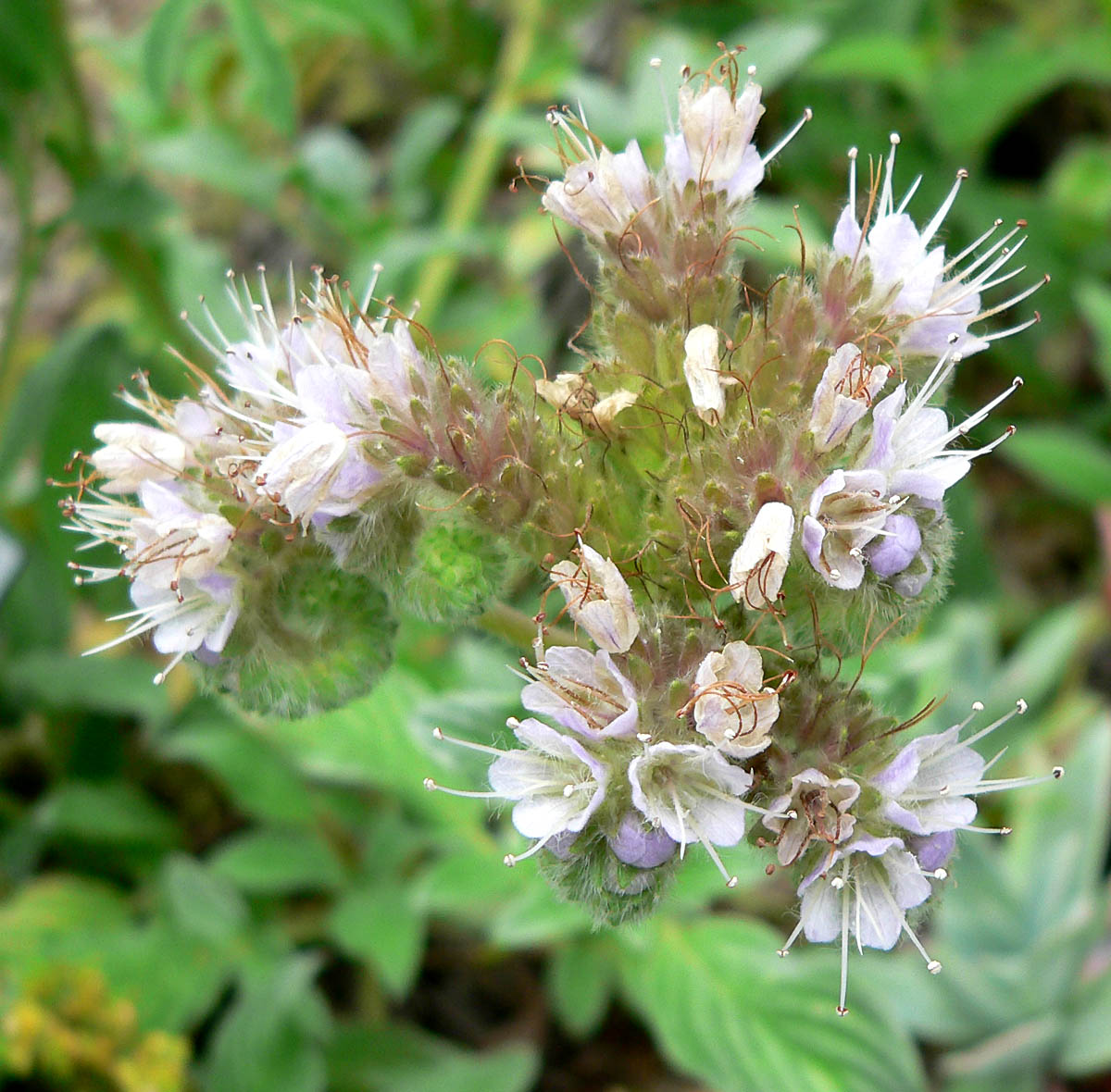
Phacelia argentea

- Phacelia argentea A.Nelson & Macbride
- Phacelia argillacea Atwood
- Phacelia arizonica A.Gray
- Phacelia artemisioides Griseb.
- Phacelia arthuri Greene
- Phacelia austromontana Howell

== B ==
- Phacelia bakeri Macbride
- Phacelia barnebyana Howell
- Phacelia beatleyae Reveal & Constance
- Phacelia bicknellii Small
- Phacelia bicolor Torr. ex S.Wats.
- Phacelia biennis A.Nelson
- Phacelia bipinnatifida Michx.
- Phacelia bolanderi - Bolander's phacelia, Bolander's scorpionweed, Blue-flowered grape-leaf, caterpillar flower
- Phacelia boliviana Brand

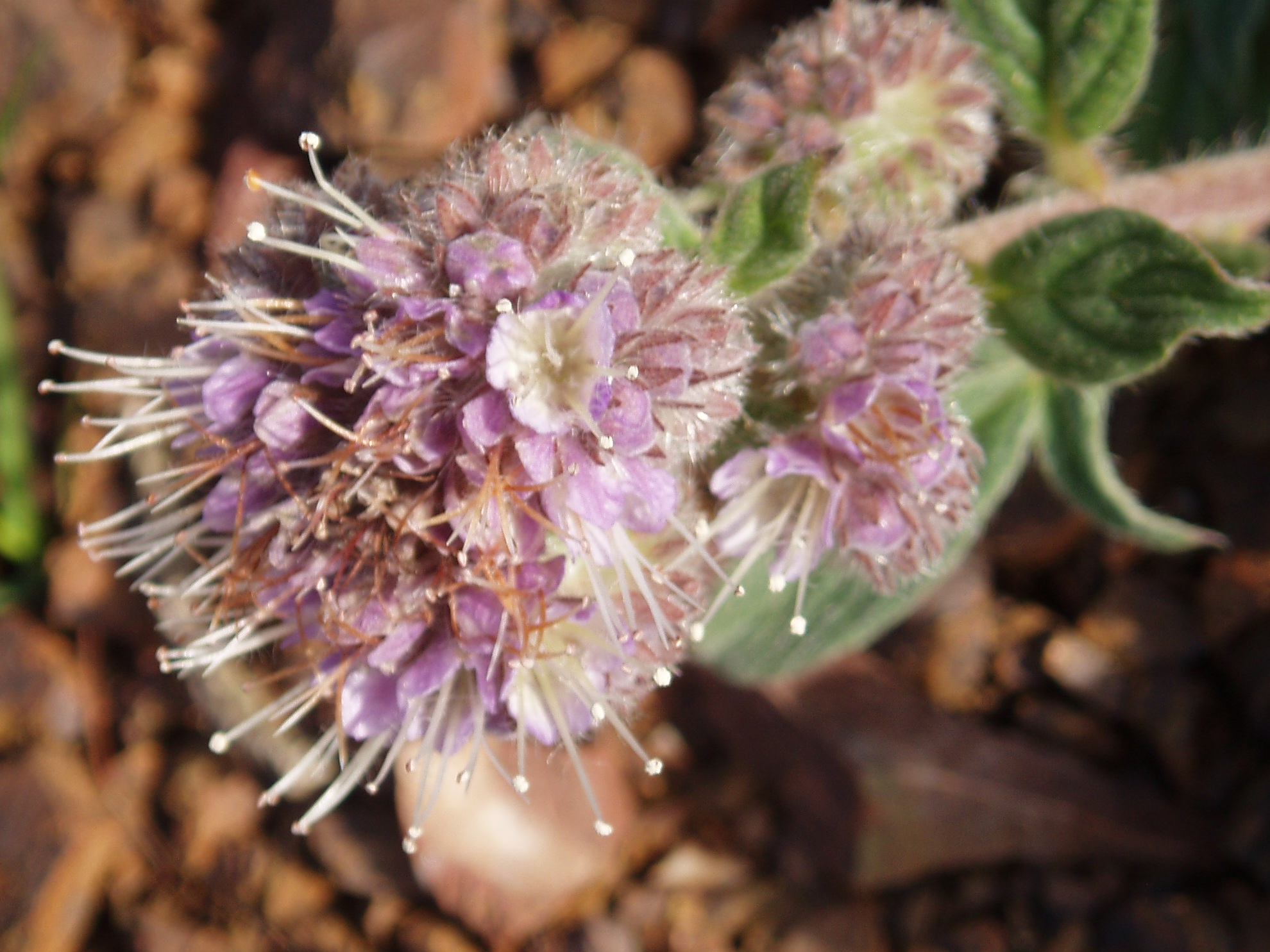
Phacelia californica

- Phacelia bombycina Wooton & Standl.
- Phacelia boykinii Small
- Phacelia brachyantha Benth.
- Phacelia brachyloba A.Gray
- Phacelia brachystemon Kunze ex Brand
- Phacelia brannani Kellogg
- Phacelia brevistylis Buckl.
- Phacelia breweri A.Gray - Brewer's phacelia
- Phacelia burkei Rydb.

== C ==
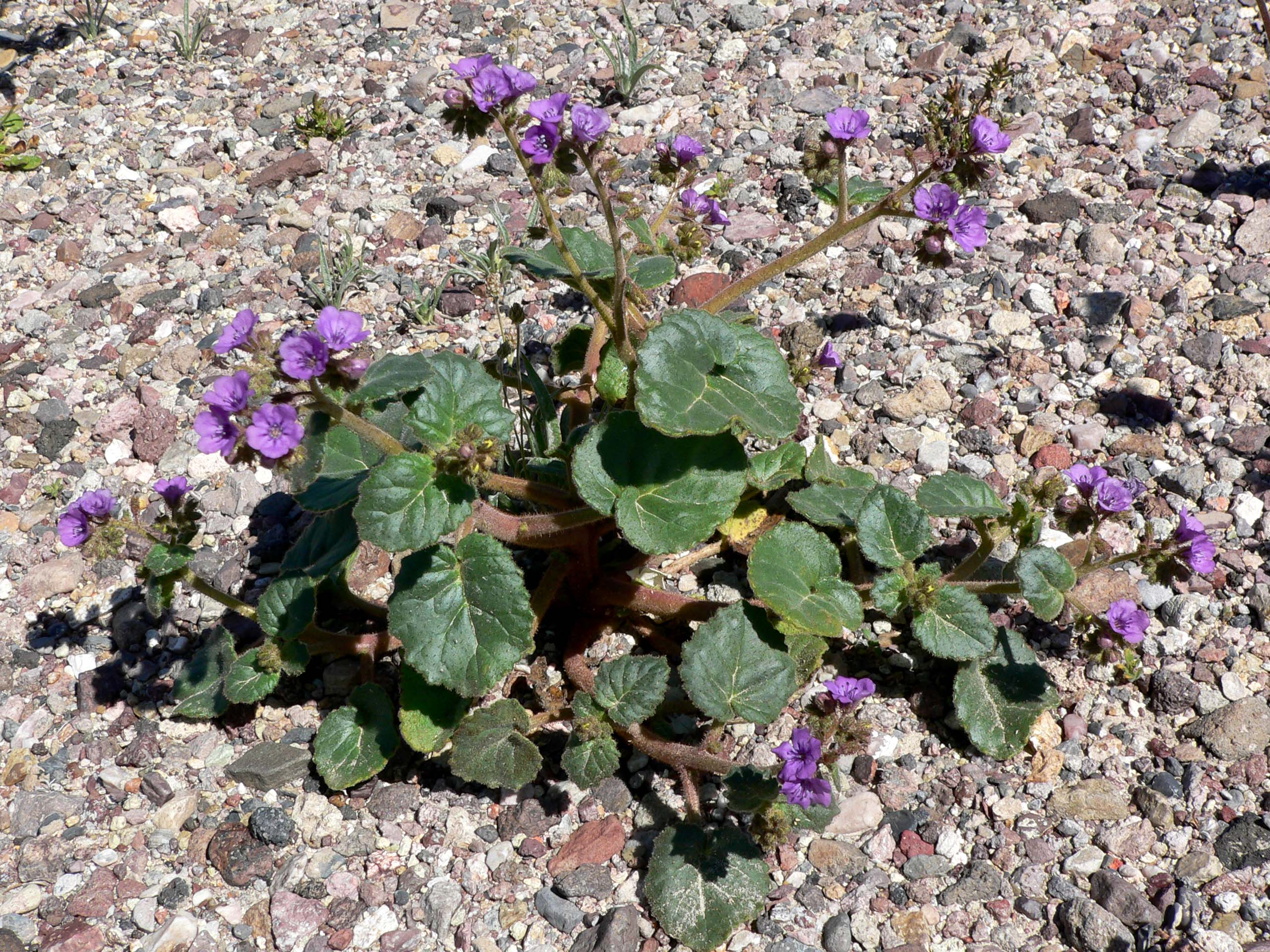
Caltha-leaved Phacelia Phacelia calthifolia

- Phacelia caerulea Greene
- Phacelia californica Cham.
- Phacelia calthifolia - Caltha-leaved phacelia
- Phacelia campanularia - California bluebell
- Phacelia campestris A.Nelson
- Phacelia canescens Nutt.
- Phacelia capitata Kruckeb.
- Phacelia carmenensis B.L.Turner

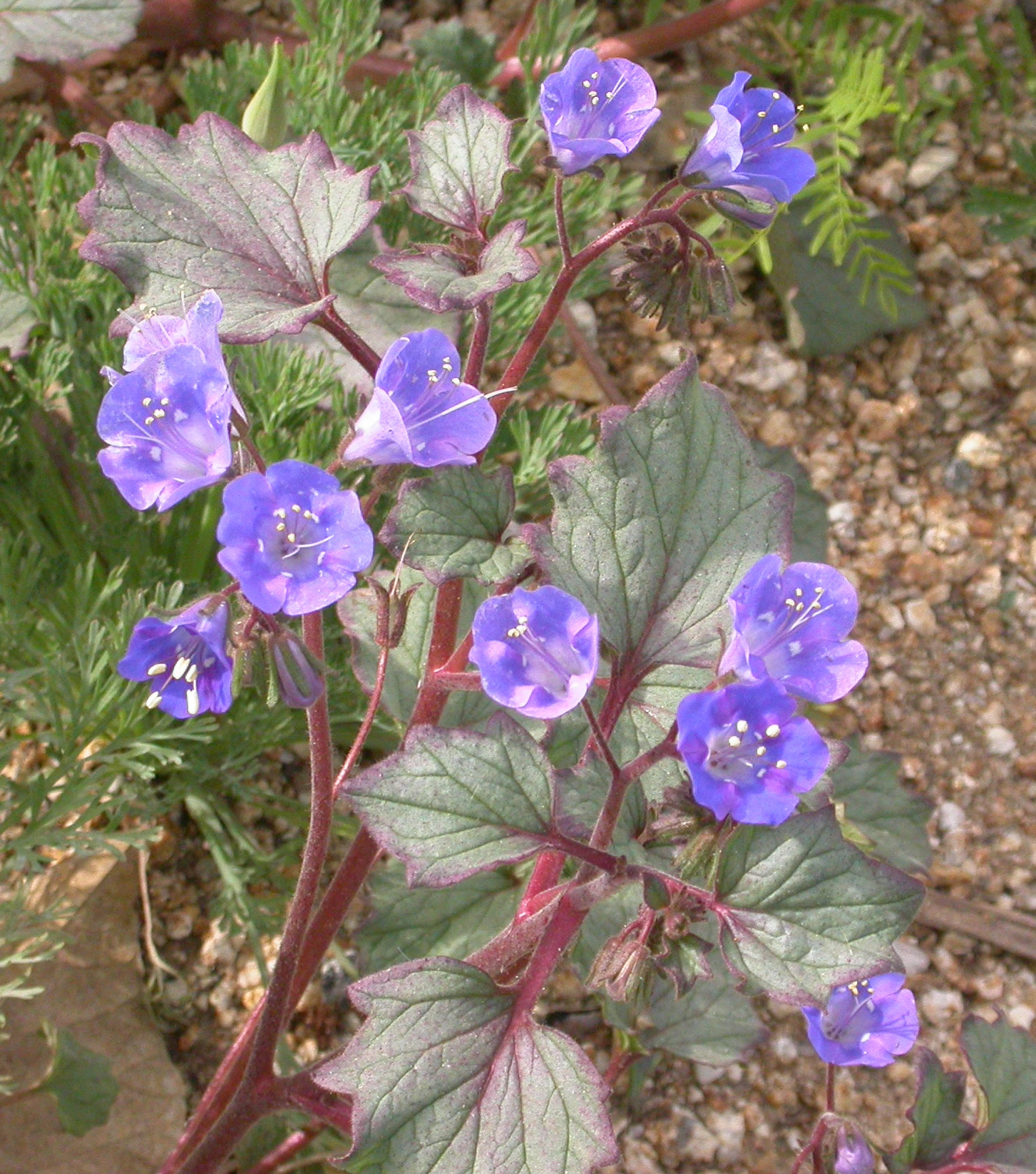
California Bluebell Phacelia campanularia

- Phacelia cedrosensis J.N.Rose
- Phacelia cephalotes A.Gray
- Phacelia cicutaria - caterpillar phacelia, caterpillar scorpionweed; includes P. hispida A.Gray
- Phacelia ciliata Benth.
- Phacelia ciliosa Rydb.
- Phacelia cinerea Eastwood ex Macbride
- Phacelia circinata Jacq.f.
- Phacelia circinatiformis A.Gray
- Phacelia clinopodioides Bert.
- Phacelia conferta G.Don
- Phacelia congdonii Greene

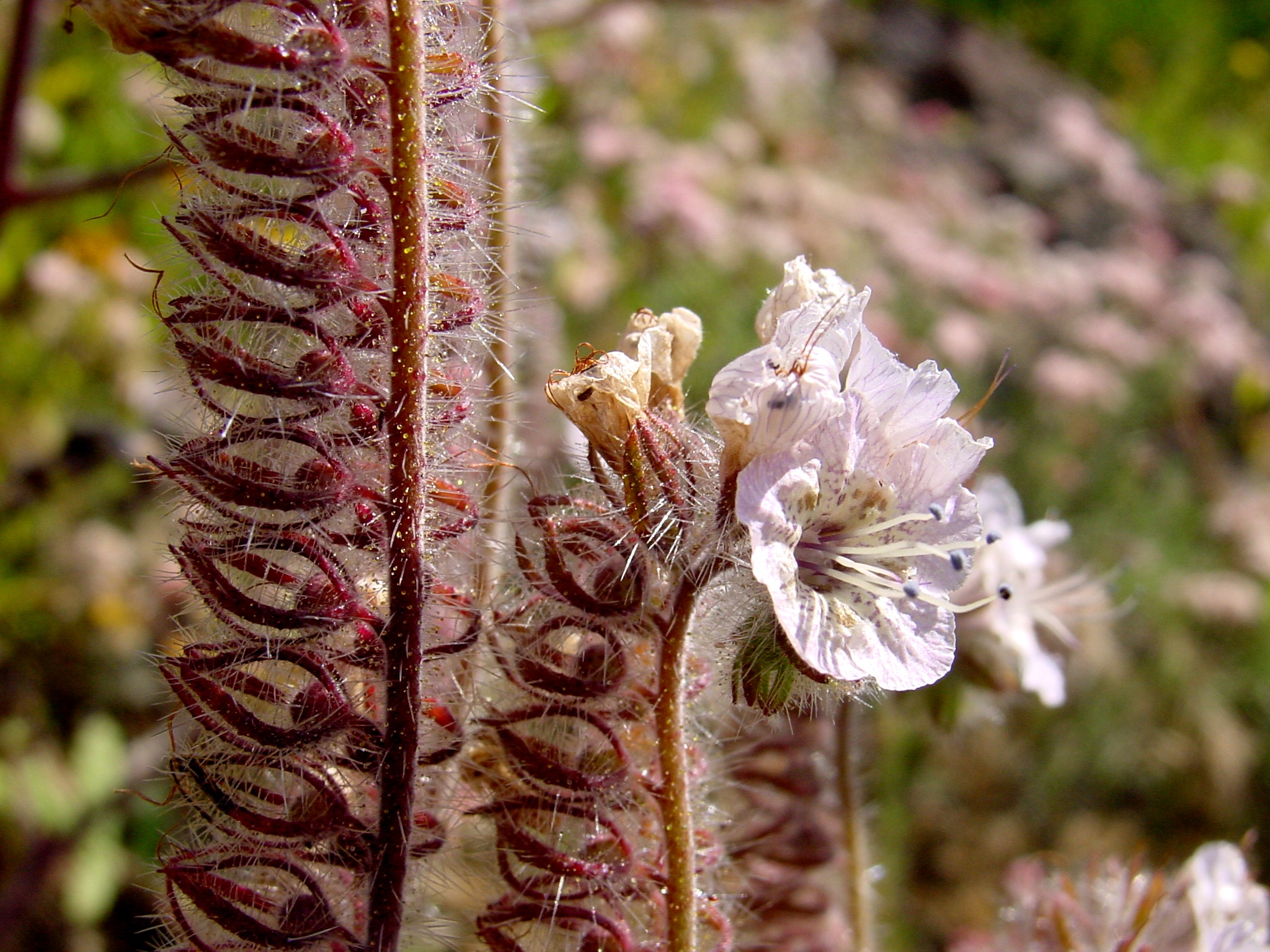
Caterpillar Phacelia Phacelia cicutaria

- Phacelia congesta Hook.
- Phacelia constancei Atwood
- Phacelia cookei Constance & Heckard
- Phacelia cooperae A.Gray
- Phacelia cordifolia S.Wats. ex Brand
- Phacelia corrugata A.Nelson
- Phacelia corymbosa Jepson
- Phacelia coulteri Greenm.
- Phacelia covillei S.Watson

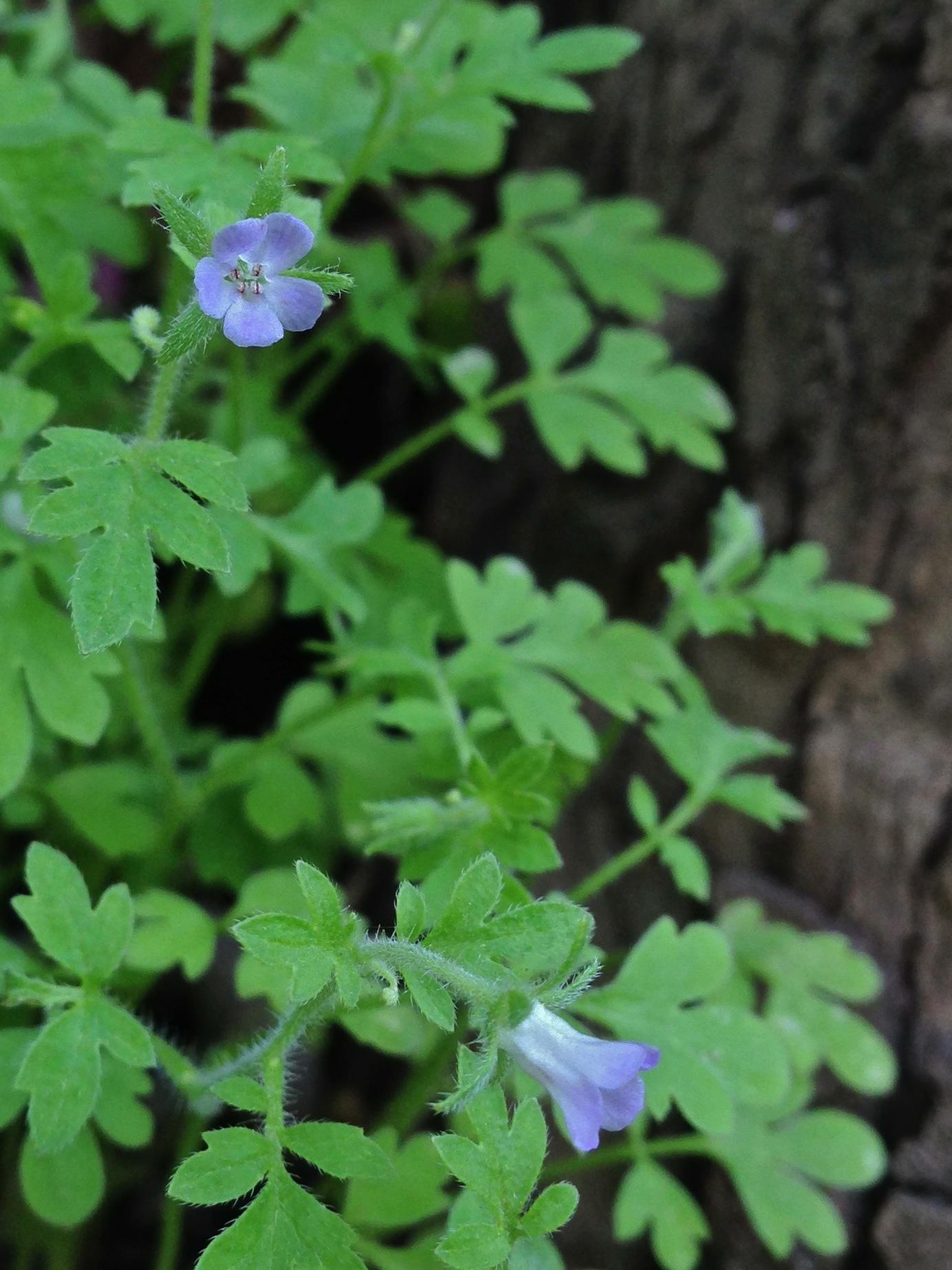
Phacelia covillei "Coville's Phacelia"

- Phacelia crassifolia Parry or Torr. ex S.Wats.

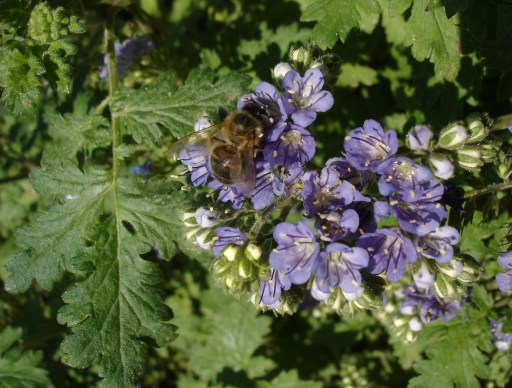
Phacelia congesta

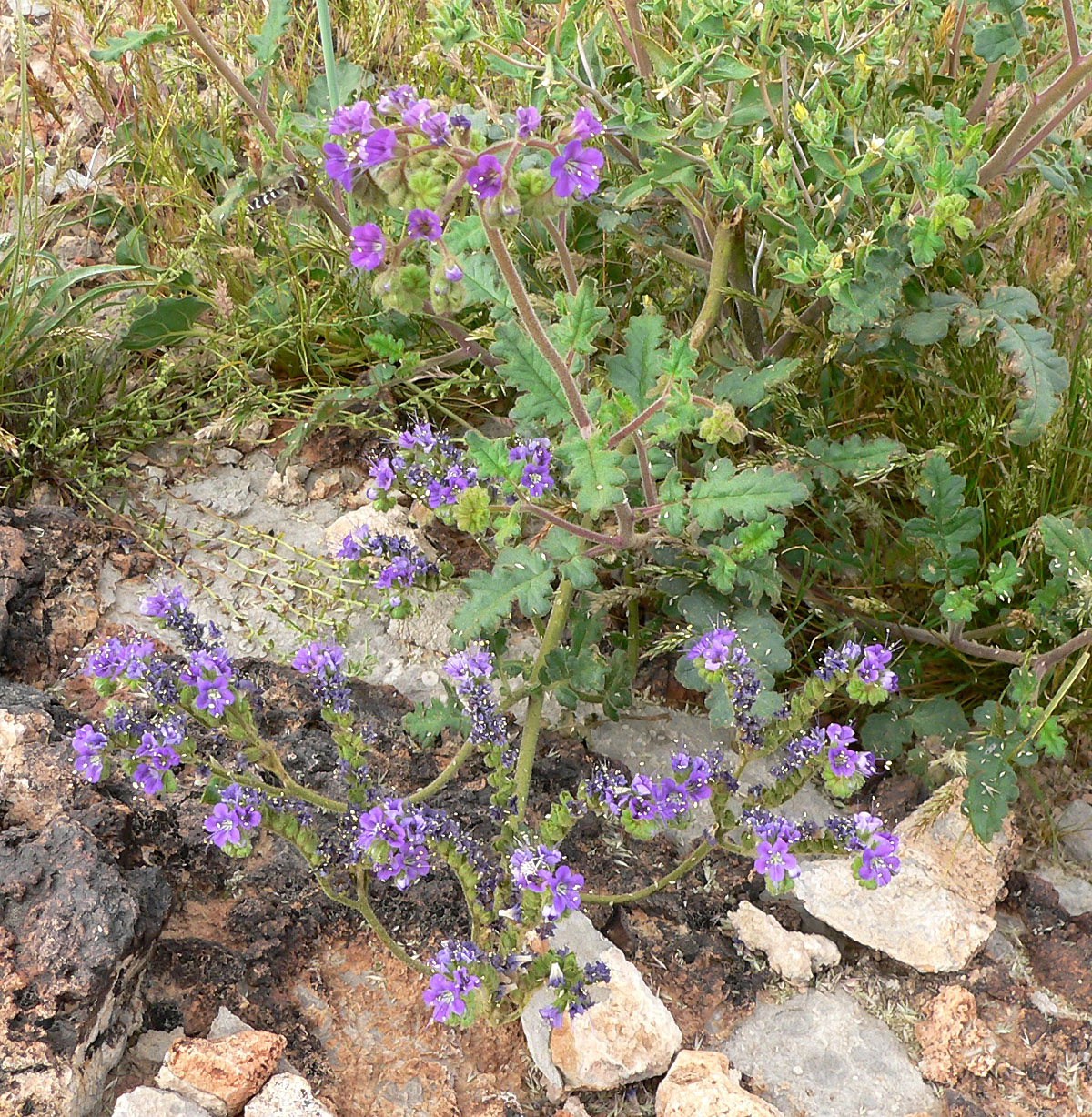
Notch-leaved Phacelia Phacelia crenulata

- Phacelia crenulata - notch-leaved phacelia
- Phacelia cronquistiana S.L.Welsh
- Phacelia cryptantha Greene
- Phacelia cumingii A.Gray
- Phacelia curvipes Torr. ex S.Wats.

== D ==
- Phacelia dalesiana Howell
- Phacelia davidsonii A.Gray
- Phacelia demissa A.Gray
- Phacelia denticulata Osterh.
- Phacelia dissecta Small
- Phacelia distans Benth. - blue phacelia
- Phacelia divaricata (Benth.) A.Gray
- Phacelia dociana Jepson & Hoover
- Phacelia douglasii Torr.
- Phacelia dubia Trel. ex Trel., Branner & Coville

== E ==
- Phacelia egena (Greene ex Brand) Greene ex J.T. Howell
- Phacelia eisenii Brandegee
- Phacelia endiplus Steud.
- Phacelia eremica Jepson
- Phacelia exilis (Gray) G.J.Lee
- Phacelia eximia Eastw.

== F ==
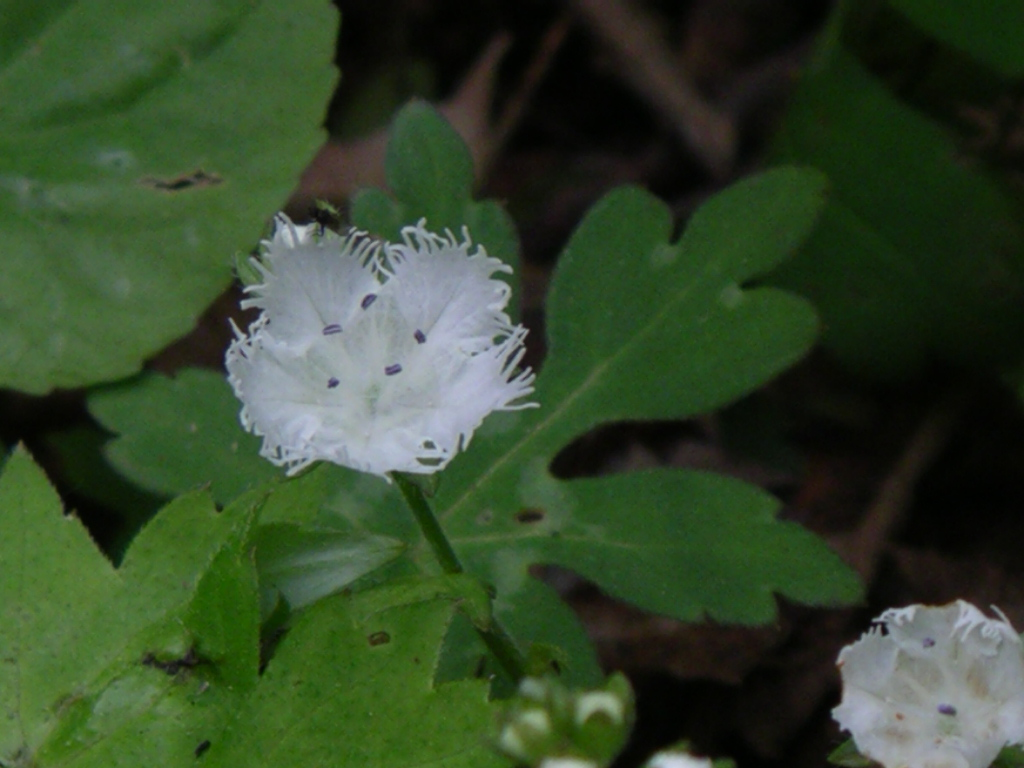
Fringed Phacelia Phacelia fimbriata

- Phacelia fallax Fernald
- Phacelia filiae N.D.Atwood, F.J.Sm. & T.A.Knight
- Phacelia filiformis Brand
- Phacelia fimbriata - fringed phacelia
- Phacelia firmomarginata A.Nelson
- Phacelia flaccida Elmer
- Phacelia floribunda Greene

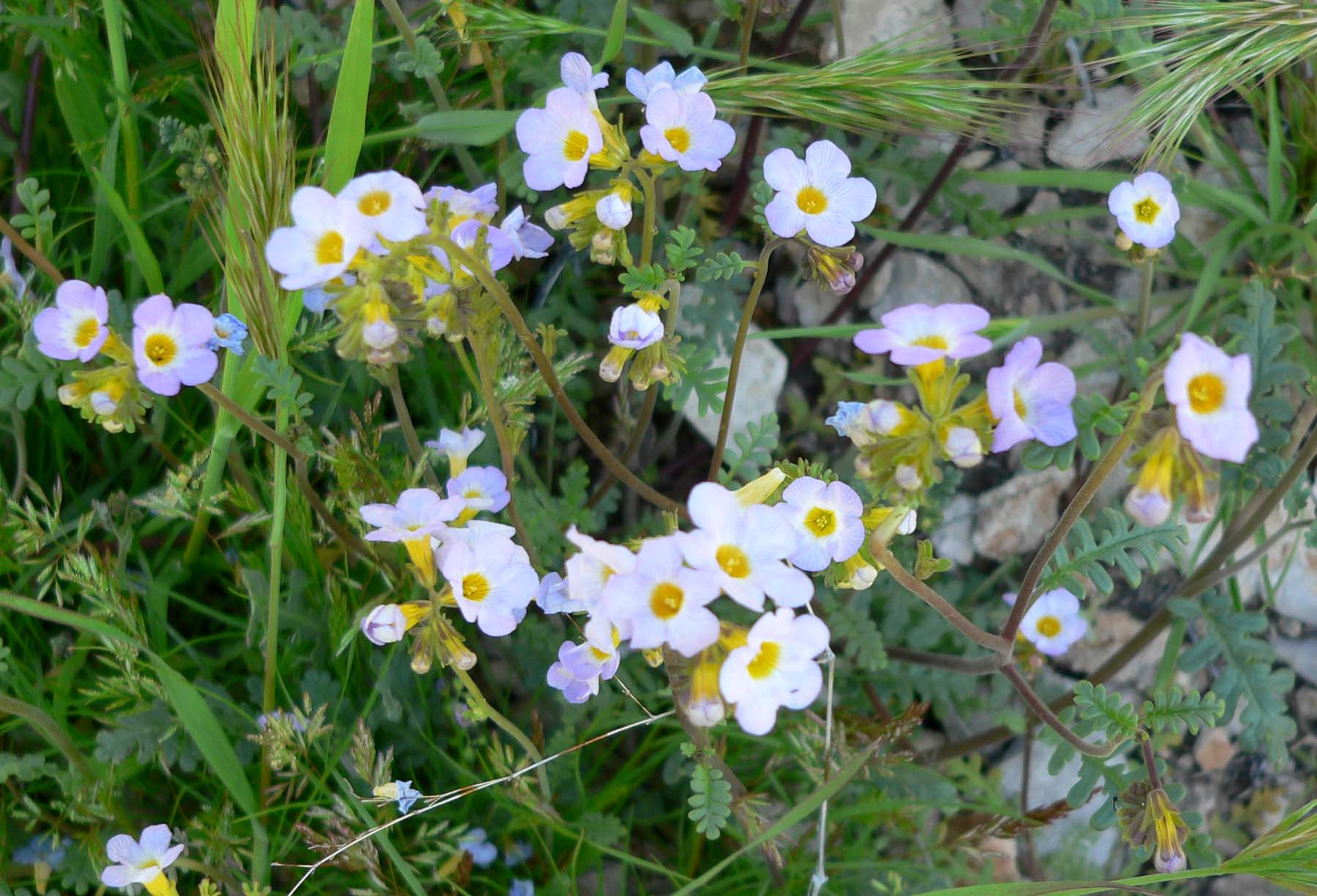
Notch-leaved Phacelia Phacelia fremontii

- Phacelia foliosa Phil.
- Phacelia foliosepala A.Nelson & Macbride
- Phacelia formosula Osterh.
- Phacelia franklinii A.Gray - Franklin's phacelia
- Phacelia fremontii - Fremont phacelia
- Phacelia furcata Dougl. ex Hook.

== G ==
- Phacelia gentryi Constance
- Phacelia geraniifolia Brand
- Phacelia gilioides Brand
- Phacelia glaberrima (Torr.ex S.Wats.)Howell
- Phacelia glabra Nutt.
- Phacelia glandulifera Piper
- Phacelia glandulosa Nutt.
- Phacelia glechomaefolia A.Gray
- Phacelia grandiflora A.Gray
- Phacelia greenei Howell
- Phacelia grisea A.Gray
- Phacelia gymnoclada Torr. ex S.Wats.
- Phacelia gypsogenia I.M.Johnst.

== H ==
- Phacelia hardhamae Munz
- Phacelia hastata Dougl. ex Lehm. - silverleaf scorpionweed
- Phacelia heterophylla Pursh
- Phacelia hintoniorum B.L.Turner
- Phacelia hirsuta Nutt.
- Phacelia hirtuosa A.Gray
- Phacelia hossei Brand
- Phacelia howelliana Atwood
- Phacelia howellii Macbride
- Phacelia hubbyi L.M. Garrison
- Phacelia humilis Torr ex Gray - low scorpionweed
- Phacelia hydrophylloides Torr. ex A.Gray

== I ==
- Phacelia idahoensis L.F.Hend.
- Phacelia imbricata Greene
- Phacelia incana Brand.
- Phacelia inconspicua Greene.
- Phacelia indecora Howell
- Phacelia infundibuliformis Torr.
- Phacelia insularis Munz
- Phacelia integrifolia Torr.
- Phacelia inundata Howell
- Phacelia invenusta A.Gray
- Phacelia inyoensis (Macbride) Howell
- Phacelia irritans Brand
- Phacelia ivesiana Torr.
- Phacelia ixodes Kellogg

== K ==
- Phacelia knighti A.Nelson

== L ==
- Phacelia laxa Small
- Phacelia laxiflora Howell
- Phacelia leibergii Brand
- Phacelia lemmonii A.Gray
- Phacelia lenta Piper
- Phacelia leonis Howell
- Phacelia leptosepala Rydb. - narrowsepal scorpionweed
- Phacelia leptostachya Greene
- Phacelia leucantha Lemmon ex Greene
- Phacelia linearis Holzinger - linearleaf scorpionweed
- Phacelia longipes Torr. ex A.Gray
- Phacelia lutea (Hook. & Arn.)Howell
- Phacelia luteopurpurea A.Nelson
- Phacelia lyallii Rydb. - Lyall's phacelia
- Phacelia lyonii (A.Gray) Rydb.

== M ==
- Phacelia maculata Wood
- Phacelia malvifolia Cham. & Schlecht.
- Phacelia mammillarensis Atwood
- Phacelia marcescens Eastwood ex Macbride
- Phacelia marshall-johnstonii N.D.Atwood & D.J.Pinkava
- Phacelia minor - Whitlavia
- Phacelia minutissima Hend.
- Phacelia mohavensis A.Gray
- Phacelia mollis Macbride - Coffee Creek scorpionweed
- Phacelia monoensis R.R.Halse
- Phacelia monosperma A.Nelson
- Phacelia mustelina Coville
- Phacelia mutabilis Greene

== N ==
- Phacelia namatoides A.Gray
- Phacelia nana Wedd.
- Phacelia nashiana Jepson
- Phacelia neffii B.L.Turner
- Phacelia neglecta M.E.Jones
- Phacelia nemoralis Greene.
- Phacelia neomexicana Thurb. ex Torr.
- Phacelia novenmillensis Munz
- Phacelia nudicaulis Eastwood

== O ==
- Phacelia orbiculatis Rydb.
- Phacelia orcuttiana A.Gray
- Phacelia orogenes Brand

== P ==
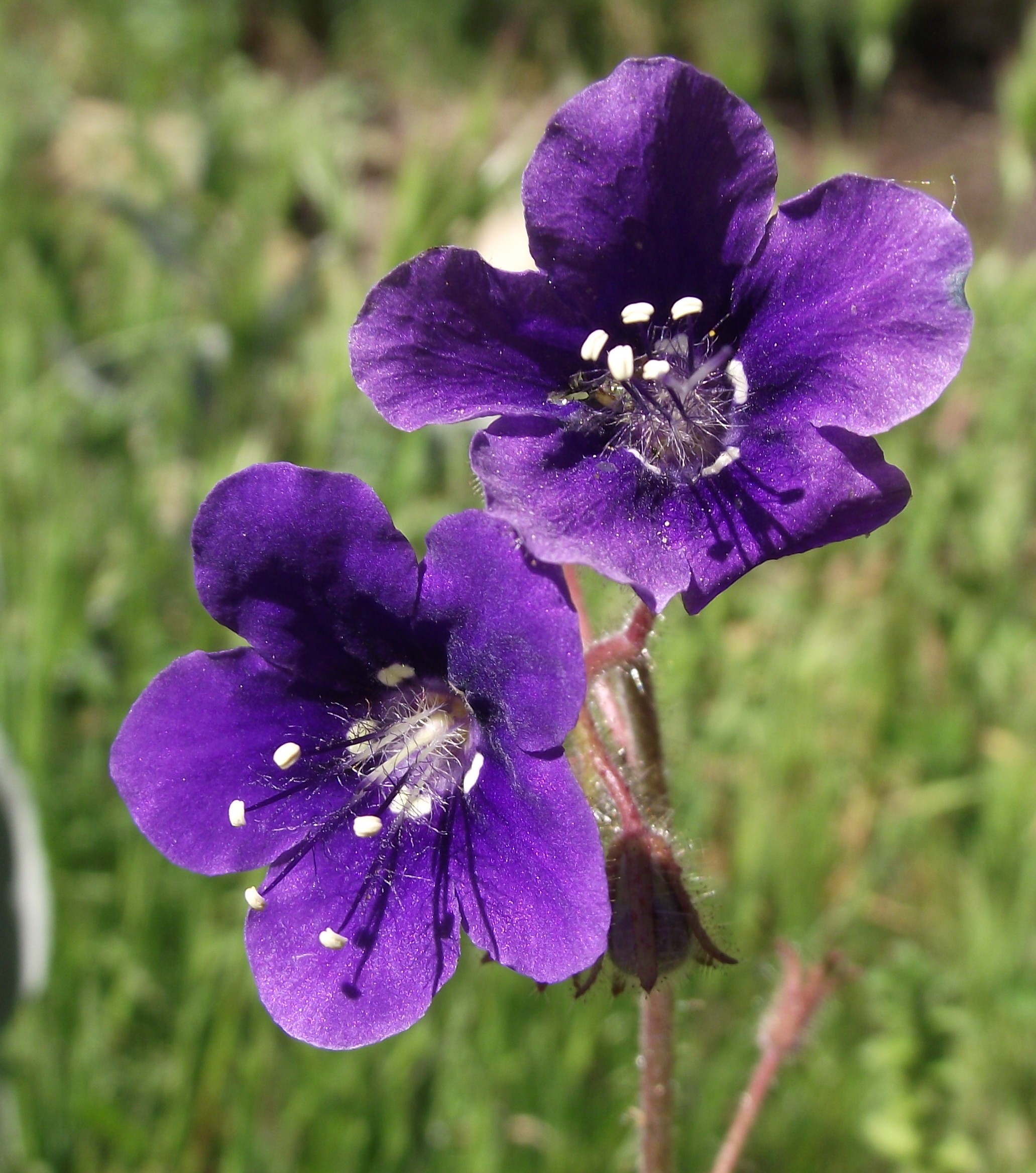
Phacelia parryi

- Phacelia pachyphylla A.Gray
- Phacelia pallida I.M.Johnst.
- Phacelia palmeri Torr. ex S.Wats.
- Phacelia parishii A.Gray
- Phacelia parryi Torr.
- Phacelia parviflora Phil. or Pursh
- Phacelia patuliflora A.Gray
- Phacelia pauciflora S.Watson
- Phacelia peckii Howell
- Phacelia pedicellata A.Gray
- Phacelia peirsoniana Howell
- Phacelia perityloides Coville
- Phacelia peruviana Spreng.
- Phacelia petiolata I.M.Johnst.
- Phacelia petrosa N.D.Atwood, F.J.Sm. & T.A.Knight
- Phacelia phacelioides Brand - Mt. Diablo phacelia
- Phacelia phyllomanica A.Gray
- Phacelia piersoniae L.Williams
- Phacelia pinnata Macbride
- Phacelia pinnatifida Griseb. ex Wedd.
- Phacelia platycarpa Spreng.
- Phacelia platyloba A.Gray
- Phacelia polysperma Brand
- Phacelia popei Torr. & Gray
- Phacelia potosina B.L.Turner
- Phacelia pringlei A.Gray
- Phacelia procera A.Gray

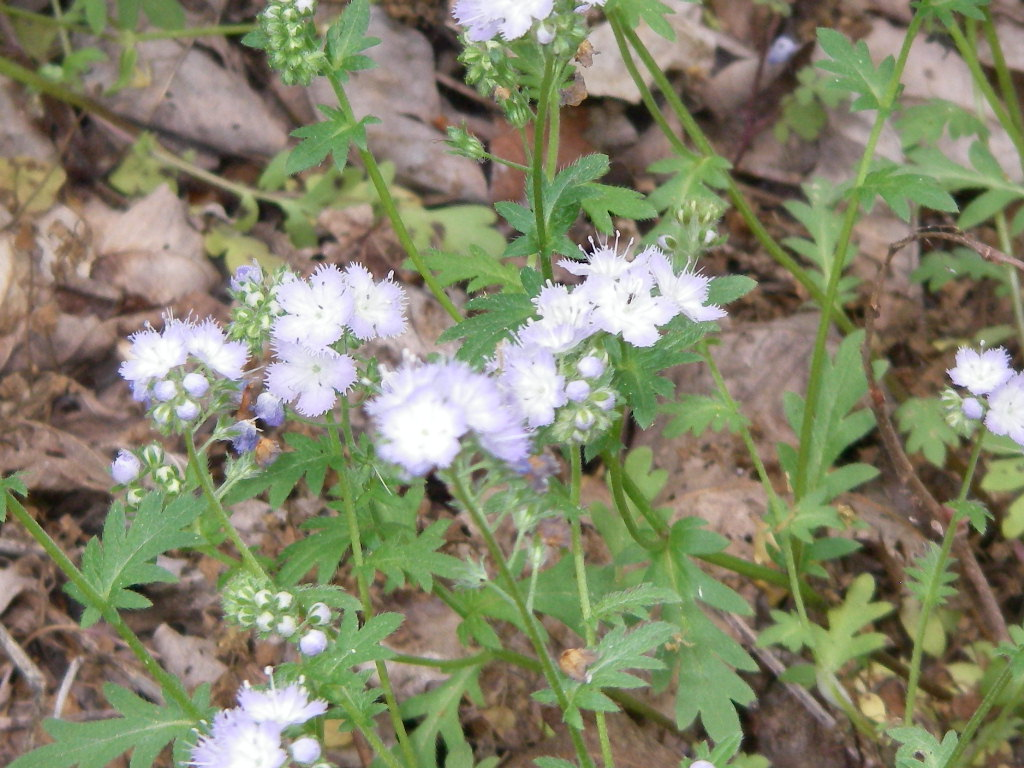
Miami Mist Phacelia purshii

- Phacelia prunellaefolia Bertero ex Brand
- Phacelia pulchella A.Gray
- Phacelia pulcherrima Constance
- Phacelia purpusii Brandegee
- Phacelia purshii - Miami mist

== Q ==
- Phacelia quickii Howell

== R ==
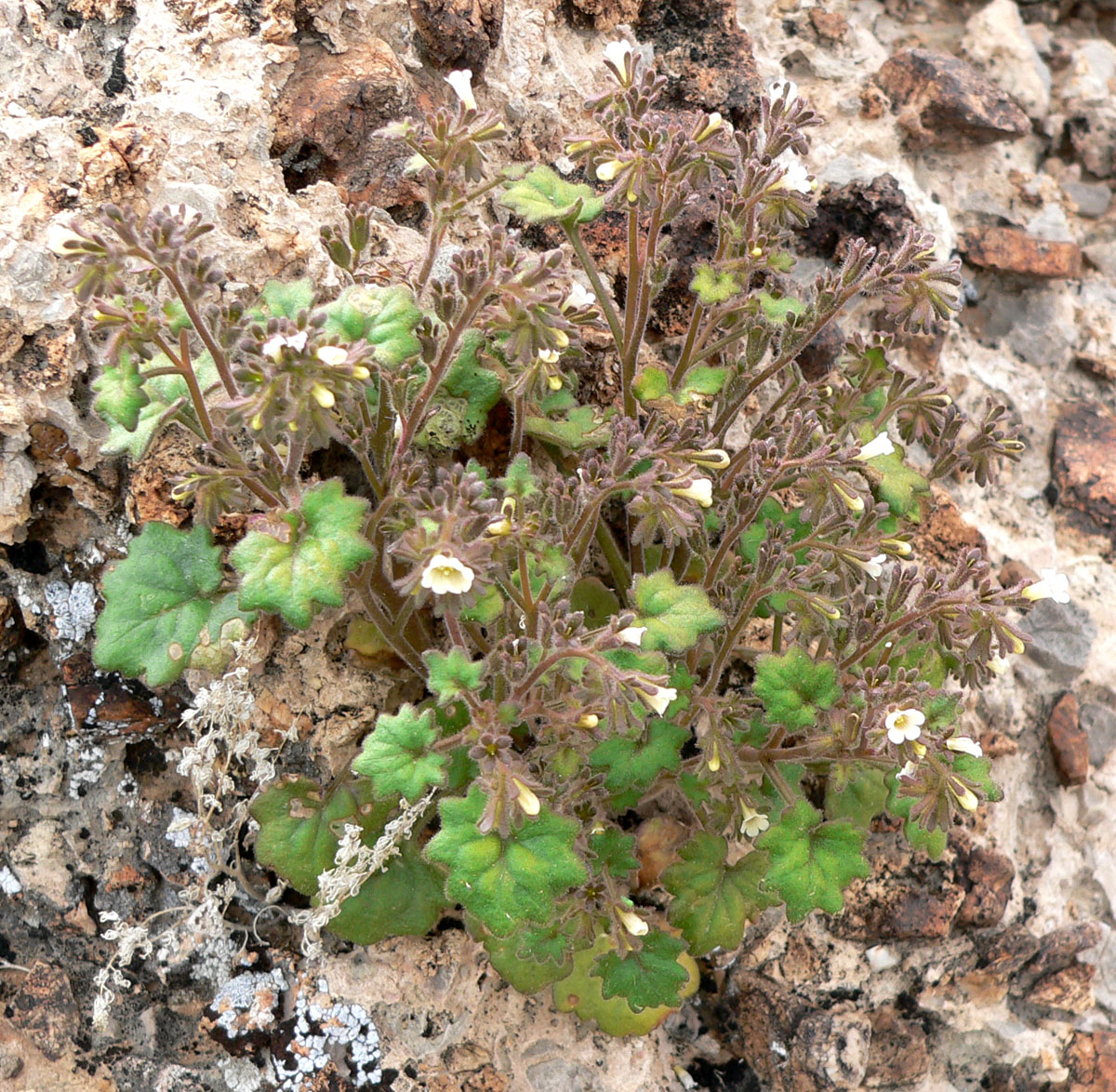
Phacelia rotundifolia

- Phacelia racemosa A.Heller
- Phacelia rafaelensis Atwood
- Phacelia ramosissima Dougl. ex Lehm. - branching scorpionweed
- Phacelia ranunculacea (Nutt.)Constance
- Phacelia rattanii A.Gray
- Phacelia robusta (Macbride) I.M.Johnst.
- Phacelia rotundifolia Torr. ex S.Wats.
- Phacelia rudis Dougl. ex A.DC.
- Phacelia rugulosa Lemmon. ex Greene
- Phacelia rupestris Greene

== S ==
- Phacelia salina (A.Nelson) Howell
- Phacelia sanzini Hicken
- Phacelia saxicola A.Gray

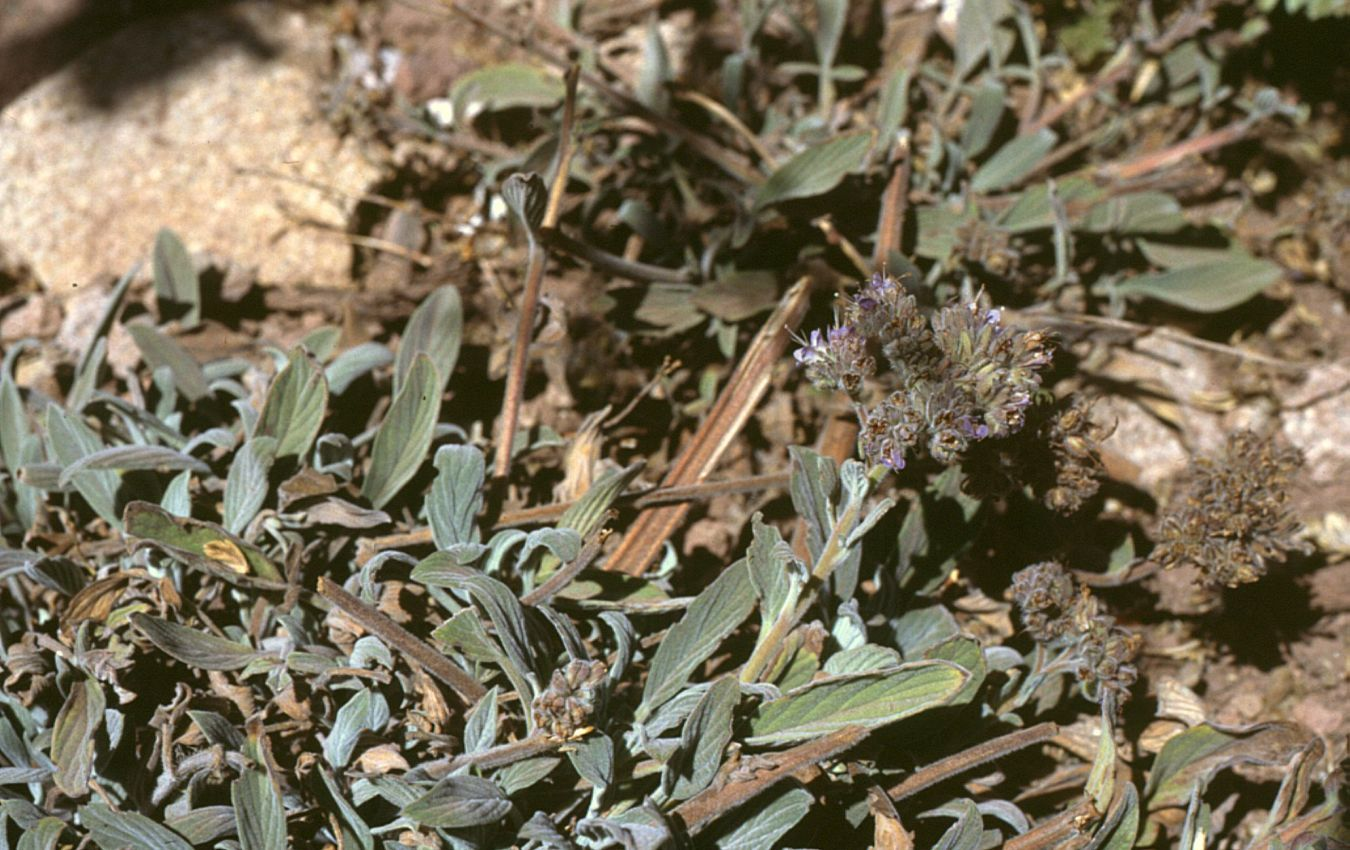
Phacelia secunda

- Phacelia scariosa Brandegee
- Phacelia scopulina (A.Nelson)Howell
- Phacelia secunda J.F.Gmel.
- Phacelia sericea A.Gray - silky scorpionweed
- Phacelia serrata J.W.Voss
- Phacelia setigera Phil.
- Phacelia sinuata Phil.
- Phacelia splendens Eastwood
- Phacelia stebbinsii Constance & Heckard
- Phacelia stellaris Brand
- Phacelia stimulans Eastw.
- Phacelia strictiflora A.Gray
- Phacelia suaveolens Greene
- Phacelia submutica Howell

== T ==
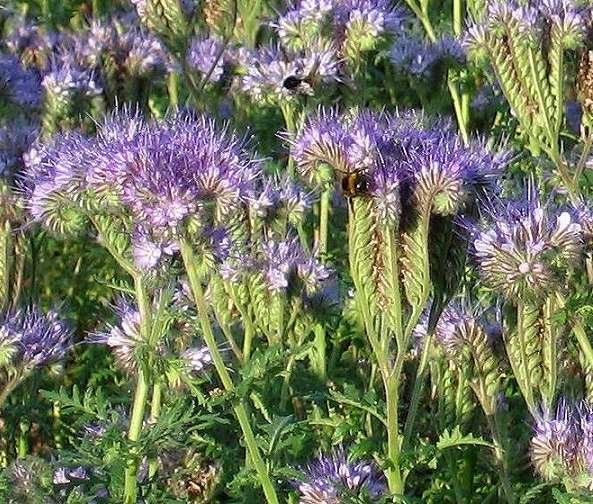
Phacelia tanacetifolia

- Phacelia tanacetifolia Benth.
- Phacelia tenuifolia Harv. ex Torr.
- Phacelia tetramera Howell
- Phacelia thermalis Greene
- Phacelia trichostemoides Greene ex Brand
- Phacelia trifoliata Gand.
- Phacelia tripinnata Hort. ex Fisch. Mey. & Ave-Lall.

== U ==
- Phacelia umbrosa Greene
- Phacelia utahensis J.W.Voss

== V ==
- Phacelia vallicola Congdon ex Brand
- Phacelia vallis-mortae J.Voss
- Phacelia verna Howell
- Phacelia villosa Phil.
- Phacelia vinifolia Paxt.
- Phacelia violacea Brand
- Phacelia viscida Torr.
- Phacelia vitifolia Steud.
- Phacelia vossii Atwood

== W ==
- Phacelia welshii Atwood
- Phacelia whitlavia A.Gray

== Z ==
- Phacelia zaragozana B.L.Turner
