= Ethmia semilugens =

Scientific classification
- Kingdom: Animalia
- Phylum: Arthropoda
- Clade: Pancrustacea
- Class: Insecta
- Order: Lepidoptera
- Family: Depressariidae
- Genus: Ethmia
- Species: E. semilugens

Binomial name
- Ethmia semilugens (Zeller, 1872)

Synonyms
- Psecadia semilugens Zeller, 1872; Anesychia multipunctella Chambers, 1874; Psecadia semiopaca Grote, 1881; Psecadia plumbeella Beutenmuller, 1889

Species of moth

Ethmia semilugens is a moth in the family Depressariidae. It is found in the United States and Mexico in the arid parts of Colorado through central Texas, New Mexico, northern Chihuahua, Arizona and southern California.

The length of the forewings is 8.7–12 mm (0.34–0.47 in). The ground color of the forewings is brownish black with a broad white dorsal margin. The ground color of the hindwings is whitish, slightly to strongly brownish toward the apex, at times mostly brownish except basally. Adults are on wing from late February to March (in south-western Texas) and to September (in Chihuahua). There are two generations per year.

The larvae feed on Phacelia calthifolia and Phacelia crenulata in California. The larvae live on the leaves without a shelter.
