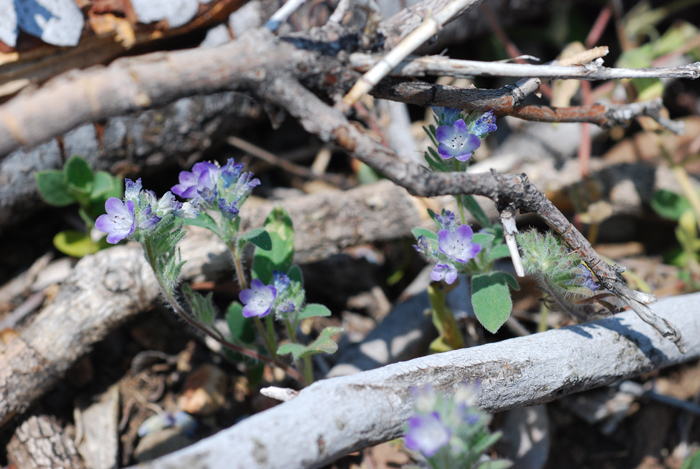

Scientific classification
- Kingdom: Plantae
- Clade: Tracheophytes
- Clade: Angiosperms
- Clade: Eudicots
- Clade: Asterids
- Order: Boraginales
- Family: Boraginaceae
- Genus: Phacelia
- Species: P. davidsonii

Binomial name
- Phacelia davidsonii A.Gray

= Phacelia davidsonii =

Species of plant

Phacelia davidsonii is a species of phacelia known by the English name Davidson's phacelia named by Asa Gray for the discoverer of this annual plant, Anstruther Davidson, a Scottish naturalist who emigrated from Scotland to Los Angeles, California, in the late nineteenth century. This native forb occurs in southern California and southern Nevada, where it grows in mountains and foothills in chaparral and woodland habitats. In California, this herb is found in the Southern Sierra Nevada, Transverse Ranges, and Peninsular Ranges.

== Description ==
Phacelia davidsonii is plant is often very similar in appearance to Phacelia curvipes and was once considered a variety of that species. It is an annual herb producing a branching or unbranched stem growing decumbent or erect to a maximum length near 20 centimeters. The leaves are oval or lance-shaped and up to 7 centimeters long, the lower ones divided into leaflets and the upper ones smaller and lobed.

The hairy inflorescence is a showy curving cluster of bell-shaped flowers each up to 1.5 centimeter long. The flowers are white-throated with deep purple lobes.
