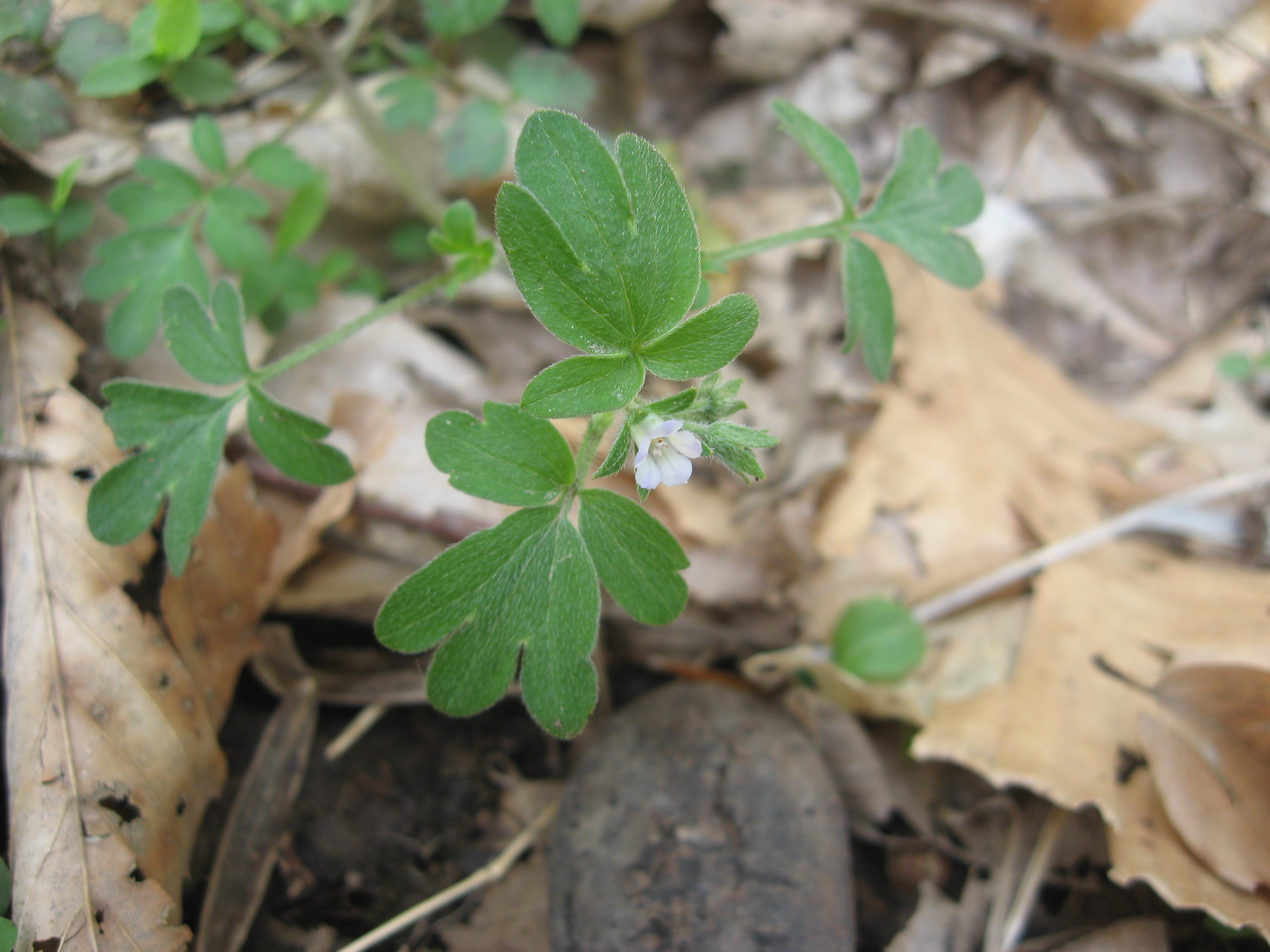

Scientific classification
- Kingdom: Plantae
- Clade: Tracheophytes
- Clade: Angiosperms
- Clade: Eudicots
- Clade: Asterids
- Order: Boraginales
- Family: Hydrophyllaceae
- Genus: Phacelia
- Species: P. ranunculacea

Binomial name
- Phacelia ranunculacea (Nuttall) Constance

= Phacelia ranunculacea =

Species of flowering plant

Phacelia ranunculacea, the oceanblue phacelia or western buttercup phacelia, is a North American species of annual forbs in the borage family. It is native to a small area of the eastern United States in the valleys of the Mississippi River and lower Ohio River. In this region, it is found in bottomland and floodplain forests. It produces a pale blue flower in early spring.

Phacelia ranunculacacea was previously considered a synonym of Phacelia covillei, but was separated from it in 2006 based on chromosomal, morphological, and geographical evidence. P. ranunculacacea differs from P. covillei in terms of midstem pubecense and terminal leaf shape.
