= Phacelia neomexicana =

Scientific classification
- Kingdom: Plantae
- Clade: Tracheophytes
- Clade: Angiosperms
- Clade: Eudicots
- Clade: Asterids
- Order: Boraginales
- Family: Hydrophyllaceae
- Genus: Phacelia
- Species: P. neomexicana

Binomial name
- Phacelia neomexicana Thurb. ex Torr.

Species of flowering plant

Phacelia neomexicana, also known by the common names New Mexico phacelia and New Mexico scorpionweed, is an annual flowering plant in the Hydrophyllaceae. The Zuni people mix the powdered root with water and use it for rashes.
