= Phacelia mammillarensis =

Scientific classification
- Kingdom: Plantae
- Clade: Tracheophytes
- Clade: Angiosperms
- Clade: Eudicots
- Clade: Asterids
- Order: Boraginales
- Family: Hydrophyllaceae
- Genus: Phacelia
- Species: P. mammillarensis

Binomial name
- Phacelia mammillarensis N.D. Atwood

Species of flowering plant

Phacelia mammillarensis, common name Nipple Beach phacelia, is a plant species native to Kane County, Utah. Type locale there, as recorded on the herbarium label, is about 9.6 km (6 miles) east of Glen Canyon City.

Phacelia mammillarensis is an annual herb with simple oblong to lanceolate leaves up to 7 mm (0.3 inches) long, covered with small glandular hairs. Inflorescences are terminal and lateral, each in the shape of a "scorpoid cyme", i.e. curled in a spiral like a scorpion's tail or like a half-open fiddlehead fern. Flowers are yellow to white.
