= Phacelia cronquistiana =

Scientific classification
- Kingdom: Plantae
- Clade: Tracheophytes
- Clade: Angiosperms
- Clade: Eudicots
- Clade: Asterids
- Order: Boraginales
- Family: Boraginaceae
- Genus: Phacelia
- Species: P. cronquistiana

Binomial name
- Phacelia cronquistiana S.L. Welsh

Species of flowering plant

Phacelia cronquistiana (Cronquist's phacelia) is a plant species native to Utah and Arizona, known only from Kane and Mohave Counties. It occurs in sagebrush and Pinus ponderosa forests at elevations of 1,900–2,100 m (6,200–6,900 ft).

Phacelia cronquistiana is an erect annual herb up to 10 cm (3.9 in) tall. Leaf blades are 3–7 mm long and 2–6 mm wide. Flowers are up to 4 mm long, pale purple with a white center.
