= Phacelia inundata =

Scientific classification
- Kingdom: Plantae
- Clade: Tracheophytes
- Clade: Angiosperms
- Clade: Eudicots
- Clade: Asterids
- Order: Boraginales
- Family: Hydrophyllaceae
- Genus: Phacelia
- Species: P. inundata

Binomial name
- Phacelia inundata J.T.Howell

Species of plant

Phacelia inundata is a species of phacelia known by the common names playa yellow phacelia and playa phacelia. It is native to the Modoc Plateau and surrounding areas in Oregon, western Nevada, and northeastern California, where it grows in the alkaline soils of playas and dry lakebeds.

== Description ==
It is an annual herb spreading along the ground or growing erect to a maximum height near 40 centimeters. It is glandular and coated in stiff hairs. The small leaves are oval or oblong and lobed or divided into segments. The inflorescence is a curving or coiling cyme of bell-shaped flowers each no more than half a centimeter long. Unlike many phacelias which have blooms in shades of purple and blue, this species has bright yellow flowers.
