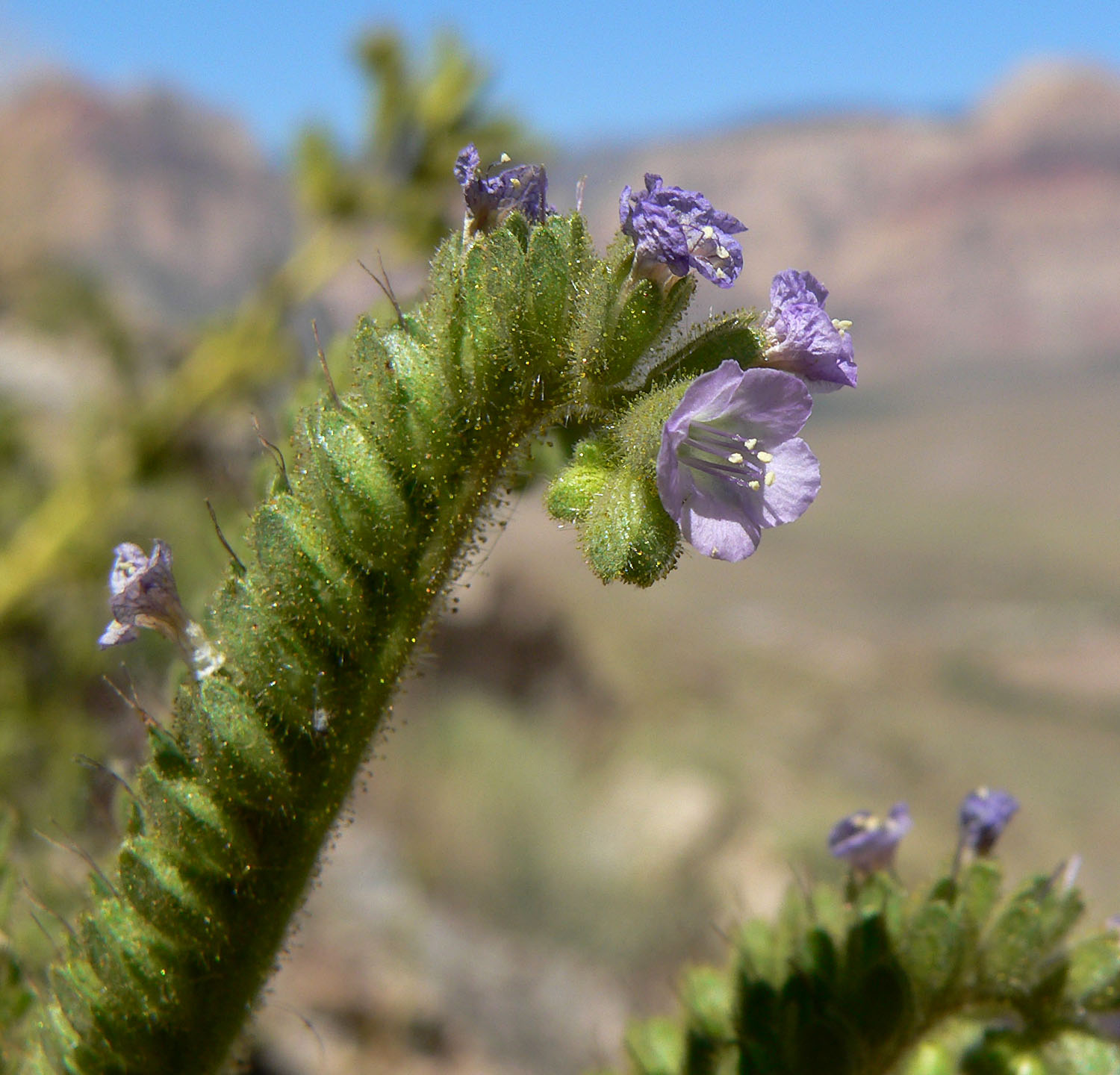

Conservation status
- Imperiled (NatureServe)

Scientific classification
- Kingdom: Plantae
- Clade: Tracheophytes
- Clade: Angiosperms
- Clade: Eudicots
- Clade: Asterids
- Order: Boraginales
- Family: Hydrophyllaceae
- Genus: Phacelia
- Species: P. anelsonii

Binomial name
- Phacelia anelsonii J.F.Macbr.

= Phacelia anelsonii =

Species of plant

Phacelia anelsonii is a species of phacelia known by the common name Aven Nelson's phacelia. It is native to the Southwestern United States, where it is known from scattered occurrences in southwestern Utah, southern Nevada, and eastern California. It can be found in scrub and woodland habitat. It is named after the botanist Aven Nelson.

It is an annual herb growing erect to a maximum height near 50 centimeters, its stem usually unbranched. It is coated in dark glandular hairs. The leaves are up to 8 centimeters long, the blades oblong in shape and divided into scalloped lobes or teeth. The inflorescence is a one-sided curving or coiling cyme of many bell-shaped flowers each about half a centimeter long. The flower is pale lavender to white. The fruit is a hairy, glandular capsule 2 or 3 millimeters long.
