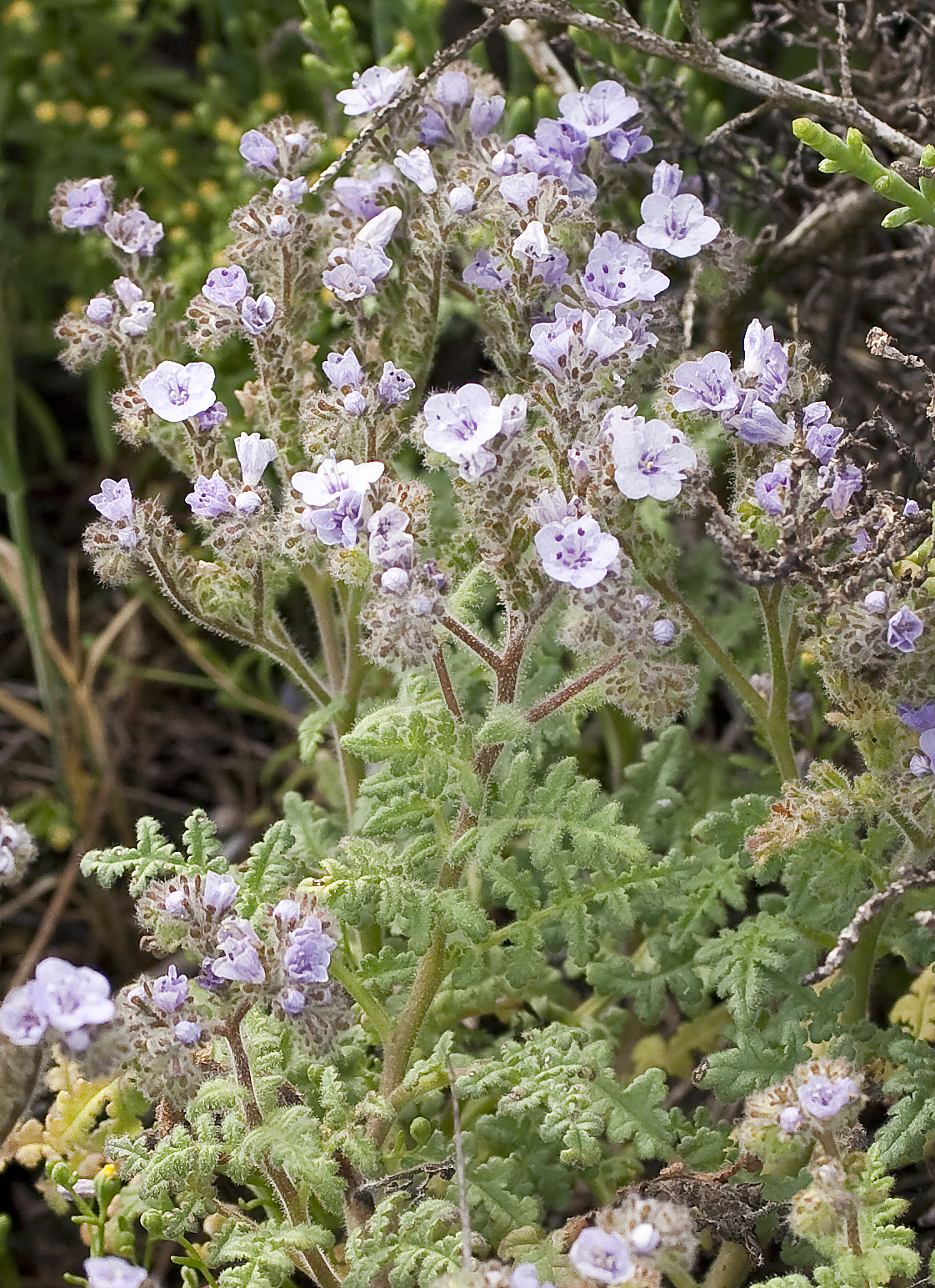

Conservation status
- Imperiled (NatureServe)

Scientific classification
- Kingdom: Plantae
- Clade: Tracheophytes
- Clade: Angiosperms
- Clade: Eudicots
- Clade: Asterids
- Order: Boraginales
- Family: Hydrophyllaceae
- Genus: Phacelia
- Species: P. floribunda

Binomial name
- Phacelia floribunda Greene

= Phacelia floribunda =

Species of flowering plant

Phacelia floribunda is a species of phacelia known by the common names many-flowered phacelia, southern island phacelia and San Clemente Island phacelia. It is known only from San Clemente Island, one of the Channel Islands of California, and Guadalupe Island off the coast of Baja California. It grows in coastal sage scrub habitat in the canyons of these two islands.

== Description ==
Phacelia floribunda is an annual herb with a branching erect stem reaching 60 centimeters in maximum height. It is glandular and hairy in texture. The leaves are up to 18 centimeters long and divided into several leaflets with lobed edges. The hairy inflorescence is a one-sided curving or coiling cyme of bell-shaped flowers. Each flower is under a centimeter long and purple or bluish in color.
