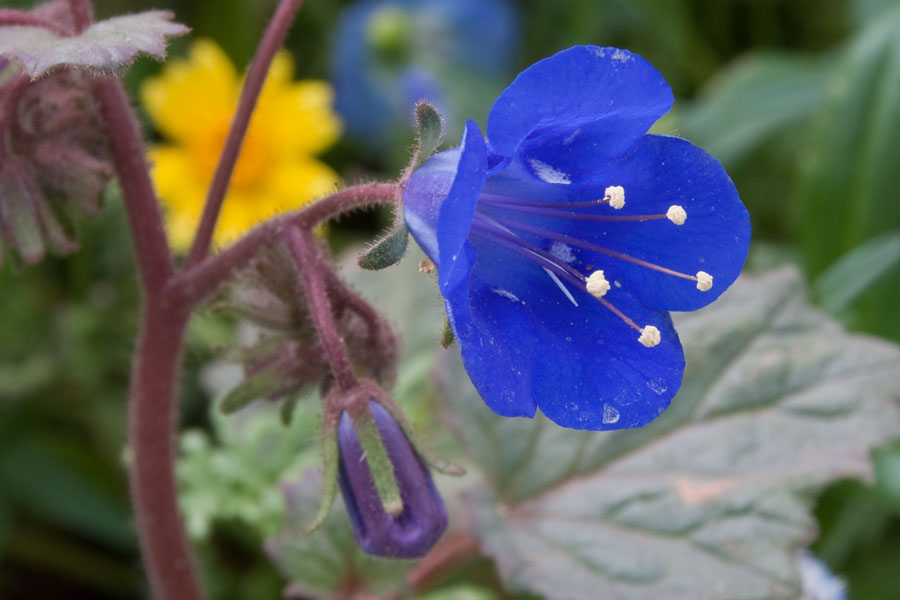

Scientific classification
- Kingdom: Plantae
- Clade: Tracheophytes
- Clade: Angiosperms
- Clade: Eudicots
- Clade: Asterids
- Order: Boraginales
- Family: Hydrophyllaceae
- Genus: Phacelia
- Species: P. nashiana

Binomial name
- Phacelia nashiana Jeps.

= Phacelia nashiana =

Species of plant

Phacelia nashiana is a species of phacelia known by the common name Charlotte's phacelia. It is endemic to California, where it is known only from the ecotone where the lower Sierra Nevada and Tehachapi Mountains transition into the Mojave Desert. It grows in scrub and woodland and on granite mountain slopes.

== Description ==
Phacelia nashiana is a mostly erect annual herb producing a small branching or unbranched stem up to about 8 centimetres (3.1 in) tall. It is coated in short, stiff, and gland-tipped black hairs. The leaves, which are mostly arranged around the base of the stem, have shallowly lobed oval or rounded blades on petioles a few centimeters long.

The hairy, glandular inflorescence is a one-sided curving or coiling cyme of bell-shaped flowers. Each flower is 1 to 2 centimeters long and brilliant deep blue in color with usually five small white spots above the white tubular throat. It has five protruding stamens tipped with white anthers.

== See also ==
Plant communities with Phacelia nashiana include:

- Creosote bush scrub
- Pinyon-juniper woodland
- Joshua Tree woodland
