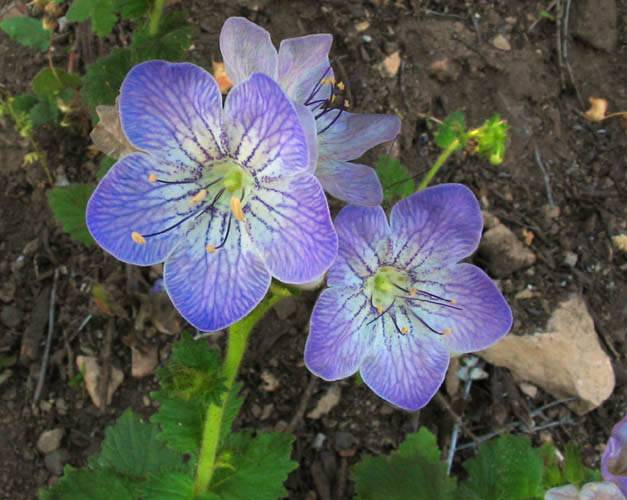

Scientific classification
- Kingdom: Plantae
- Clade: Tracheophytes
- Clade: Angiosperms
- Clade: Eudicots
- Clade: Asterids
- Order: Boraginales
- Family: Hydrophyllaceae
- Genus: Phacelia
- Species: P. grandiflora

Binomial name
- Phacelia grandiflora (Benth.) A.Gray

= Phacelia grandiflora =

Species of plant

Phacelia grandiflora is a species of phacelia known by the common name largeflower phacelia. It is native to the coastal hills and southern Transverse Ranges of southern California and Baja California, where it grows in coastal sage scrub, chaparral, and other local habitat, including areas recently burned by wildfire.

== Description ==
Phacelia grandiflora is an annual herb with a branching or unbranched erect stem reaching one meter in maximum height. It is glandular and coated in soft and stiff hairs. The leaves are up to 15 centimeters long with toothed, rounded or oval blades borne on long petioles. The large, hairy, glandular inflorescence is a one-sided curving or coiling cyme of widely bell-shaped flowers. Each flower is up to 2.5 centimeters long and purple to blue in color, usually with a paler throat.

There are reports that glandular hairs of stems, flowers and leaves of P. grandiflora secrete oil droplets that can cause an unpleasant skin rash (contact dermatitis) in some people.
