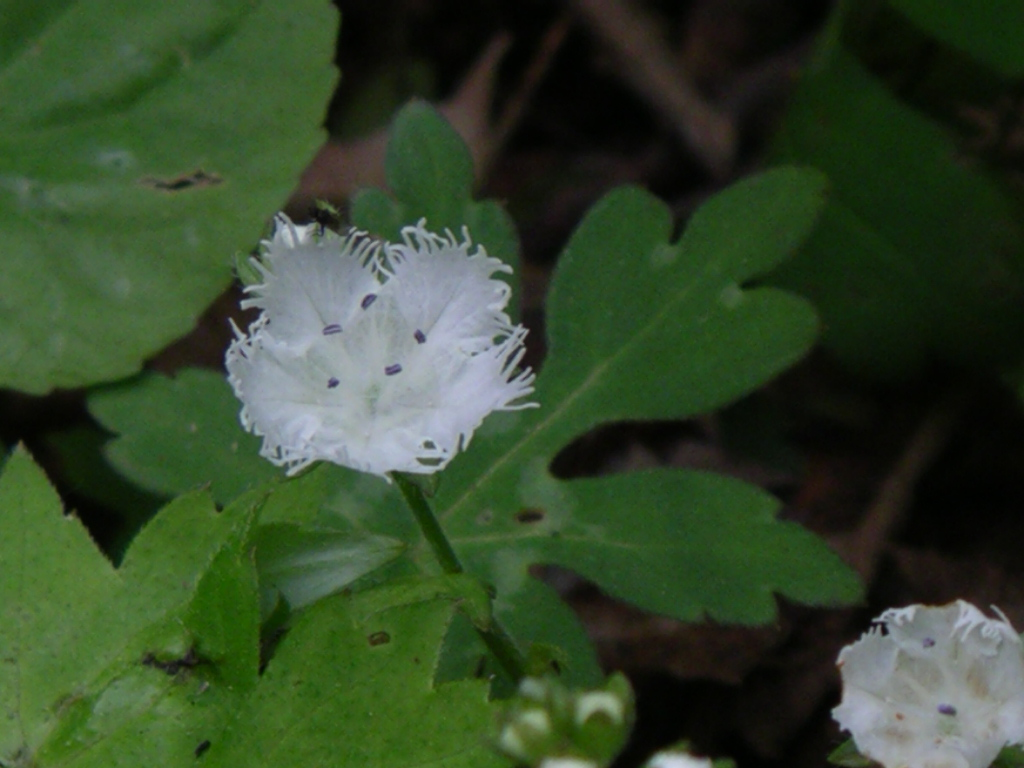

Conservation status
- Apparently Secure (NatureServe)

Scientific classification
- Kingdom: Plantae
- Clade: Tracheophytes
- Clade: Angiosperms
- Clade: Eudicots
- Clade: Asterids
- Order: Boraginales
- Family: Hydrophyllaceae
- Genus: Phacelia
- Species: P. fimbriata

Binomial name
- Phacelia fimbriata Michx.

= Phacelia fimbriata =

Species of flowering plant

Phacelia fimbriata, commonly known as fringed phacelia, is a United States annual wildflower native to the Great Smoky Mountains. Phacelia frimbriata is known for its white flowers with distinctive fringed petals that bloom during the early spring period, and its preference for rich, moist forests at mid to high elevations. The species is most abundant in states surrounding the Appalachian Mountains because of its distinct mesic environments best suited for Phacelia fimbriata. Phacelia fimbriata was discovered in 1803 by a French botanist named André Michaux.

== Physical description ==
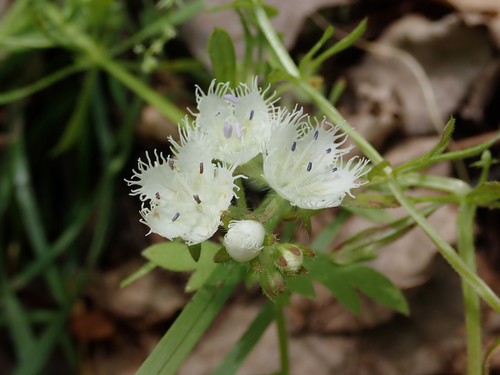
Close-up picture of Phacelia fimbriata.

Phacelia fimbriata is a herbaceous plant with white flowers and deeply fringed petals, that typically grows up to 15 inches (38cm) tall. Phacelia fimbriata typically grows low in height and is clustered in mesic forest understories. The leaves are alternate, petiolate, and broadleaf, displaying variable leaf complexity from 2-7 leaflets. Leaflet margins can include entire, serrate, dentate, or lobed. The leaves are unscented and pinnate. The inflorescences of the plant have actinomorphic flowers with five petals, a superior ovary, and parietal placentation. The flowers are typically white, though color varies among sister species. After pollination, the flowers produce dry capsules that contain seeds.

== Distribution and habitat ==
Phacelia fimbriata is most frequently found in the Southern Appalachian Region of the U.S. Its native range expands from this region into nearby states, including Tennessee, North Carolina, Alabama, Georgia, and Virginia. This species is concentrated in the Appalachian counties where the environment is most suitable. The species grows in nutrient-rich forests across a narrow range of elevation, often higher elevations being favorable. Its seeds require cooler temperatures and wet habitats for germination, making higher elevations in the Great Smoky Mountains National Park an ideal habitat for the species to grow in large populations. In this region, Phacelia fimbriata can be found along streams, in moist areas, in Cove Forest, Hardwood Forest, or in moist seepage areas. In suitable environments, Phacelia fimbriata can reproduce in very large quantities, forming a vast spring population where thousands of plants cover the forest floor. Although the species is native to a few regions, it can become locally abundant, producing dense patches of reproduction in the habitat. In areas such as the Great Smoky Mountains, the plants often bloom in large masses along trails covering rocks, logs, and the forest floor during peak flowering season. This annual pattern reflects its adaptation to moist forests at higher elevations, where conditions support both the germination and development of large populations.

== Reproductive ecology ==
Phacelia fimbriata displays a spring ephemeral reproductive timing, with flowers that primarily bloom in April and May. This species produces one-sided, coiled clusters of white flowers with deeply fringed petals. Individual flowers open up to five rounded lobes with distinctly fringed margins, measuring almost 1/2 inch across.Pollinator diversity within Phacelia fimbriata is low, and consists mainly of bees that are native to the Great Smoky Mountains.

== Sister species ==
Phacelia fimbriata's sister species, Phacelia purshii, also known as Miami Mist, is closely related and almost morphologically identical. P. purshii can also be found in the Appalachian region, although similar, the two species differ in ecology, germination, and elevation range.

Ecological divergence

Phacelia fimbriata is typically found in higher elevations and moist forests, where its seeds require cooler temperatures to break dormancy. Whereas its close relative P. purshii occurs at lower elevations and germinates more readily under warmer conditions. The two species also show strong post-zygotic reproductive isolation; while pollen tubes from interspecific crosses reach the ovules, hybrid embryos do not develop. According to this study, Phacelia fimbriata and P. purshii are a monophyletic sister pair that remain genetically distinct because of different elevations, germination cues, and reproductive barriers.

Morphological differences

Well-known for its very thin, finely fringed lobes, Phacelia fimbriata stands out from P. purshii, which has rounded, wider lobes with shorter, less elaborated fringes, and comes in a range of stronger blues and lilacs. Coming from the size of the plant itself, Phacelia fimbriata is also smaller and more fragile than P. purshii, with a more brittle stem, and other regional species that grow in cove forests and rich hardwood stands don't have the distinctive fringe that makes Phacelia fimbriata easy to identify.
