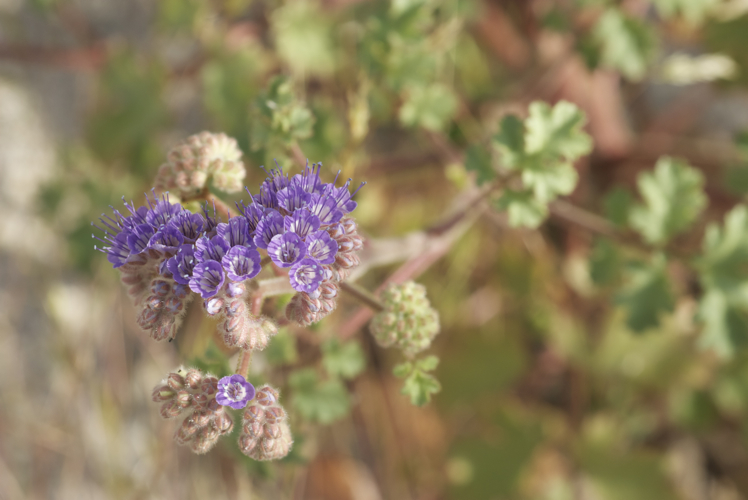

Conservation status
- Apparently Secure (NatureServe)

Scientific classification
- Kingdom: Plantae
- Clade: Tracheophytes
- Clade: Angiosperms
- Clade: Eudicots
- Clade: Asterids
- Order: Boraginales
- Family: Hydrophyllaceae
- Genus: Phacelia
- Species: P. pedicellata

Binomial name
- Phacelia pedicellata A.Gray

= Phacelia pedicellata =

Species of plant

Phacelia pedicellata is a species of flowering plant in the family Hydrophyllaceae. Its common names include specter phacelia and pedicellate phacelia. It is native to the southwestern United States and Baja California, where it can be found in several types of habitat, including creosote bush scrub and Joshua tree woodland.

It is an annual herb growing a mostly erect stem up to 50 centimeters long. It is glandular and coated in stiff hairs, which, like those of many other phacelias, cause dermatitis when touched. The leaves are up to 12 centimeters long with rounded or oval blades, the largest divided into 3 to 7 leaflets. The hairy, glandular inflorescence is a one-sided curving or coiling cyme of bell-shaped flowers. Each flower is roughly half a centimeter long and may be pink to blue in color.

There are reports that glandular hairs of stems, flowers and leaves of P. pedicellata secrete oil droplets that can cause an unpleasant skin rash (contact dermatitis) in some people.
