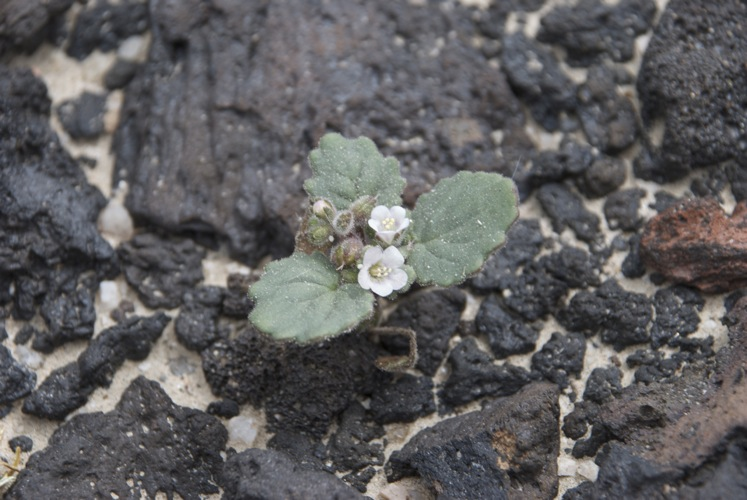

Conservation status
- Secure (NatureServe)

Scientific classification
- Kingdom: Plantae
- Clade: Tracheophytes
- Clade: Angiosperms
- Clade: Eudicots
- Clade: Asterids
- Order: Boraginales
- Family: Hydrophyllaceae
- Genus: Phacelia
- Species: P. neglecta

Binomial name
- Phacelia neglecta M.E.Jones

= Phacelia neglecta =

Species of plant

Phacelia neglecta is a species of flowering plant in the family Hydrophyllaceae. Its common names include alkali phacelia and neglected scorpionweed. It is native to the deserts of the southwestern United States in Nevada, Arizona, and southeastern California, where it grows in varied desert habitat, including areas with alkali soils. It is likely that its distribution extends into Baja California.

It is a mostly erect annual herb producing a small mostly unbranched stem up to about 20 centimeters tall. It is coated thinly in glandular hairs. The leaves, which are mostly arranged around the base of the stem, have crinkly or wavy-edged round blades on petioles a few centimeters long. The hairy, glandular inflorescence is a one-sided curving or coiling cyme of funnel- or bell-shaped flowers. Each flower is about half a centimeter long and white to cream in color.
