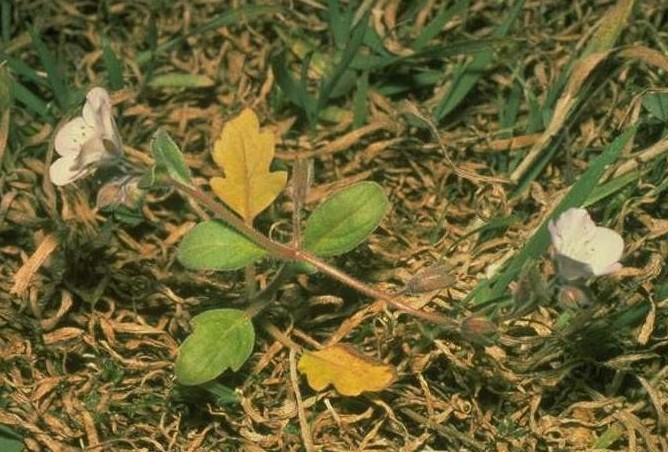
- var. insularis

Conservation status
- Imperiled (NatureServe)

Scientific classification
- Kingdom: Plantae
- Clade: Tracheophytes
- Clade: Angiosperms
- Clade: Eudicots
- Clade: Asterids
- Order: Boraginales
- Family: Hydrophyllaceae
- Genus: Phacelia
- Species: P. insularis

Binomial name
- Phacelia insularis Munz

= Phacelia insularis =

Species of plant

Phacelia insularis, the coast phacelia is a rare species of phacelia. It is endemic to California, where it has a disjunct distribution.

- Phacelia insularis var. continentis – North Coast phacelia, is known only from the coastline of Mendocino and Marin Counties
- Phacelia insularis var. insularis – North Channel Islands phacelia, is native to Santa Rosa and San Miguel Islands, two of the Channel Islands of California. The latter variety is federally listed as an endangered species and may be currently limited to one occurrence on Santa Rosa Island.

== Description ==
Phacelia insularis is an annual herb with stems reaching about 20 centimeters long, the North Coast variety decumbent or somewhat upright and the island variety growing erect. It is glandular and coated in stiff hairs. The leaves may be up to 8 centimeters long and are borne on petioles. The larger leaves have blades divided deeply into lobes. The inflorescence is a one-sided curving or coiling cyme of many purple flowers. The North Coast variety has bell-shaped flowers under a centimeter in length, while the island variety has wider, sometimes larger flowers.
