= Phacelia parishii =

Scientific classification
- Kingdom: Plantae
- Clade: Tracheophytes
- Clade: Angiosperms
- Clade: Eudicots
- Clade: Asterids
- Order: Boraginales
- Family: Hydrophyllaceae
- Genus: Phacelia
- Species: P. parishii

Binomial name
- Phacelia parishii A.Gray

Species of plant

Phacelia parishii is an uncommon species of phacelia known by the common name Parish's phacelia. It is native to the desert southwest of the United States, where it is known from scattered occurrences in Nevada and Arizona, and about two occurrences in California. It grows in desert scrub and alkali soils such as in playas, barren dry lakes, and gypsum beds.

It is an annual herb growing a spreading, erect stem up to 15 centimeters (6 in) tall. It is coated in soft, short, glandular hairs. The leaves, which spread around the lower stem, are up to 3 centimeters (1 1/4 in) long with oval blades with smooth or faintly toothed edges. The small, fuzzy inflorescence is a one-sided curving or coiling cyme of narrow bell-shaped flowers. Each flower is about one-half centimeter (1/4 in) long and light purple in color with a yellowish tubular throat.
