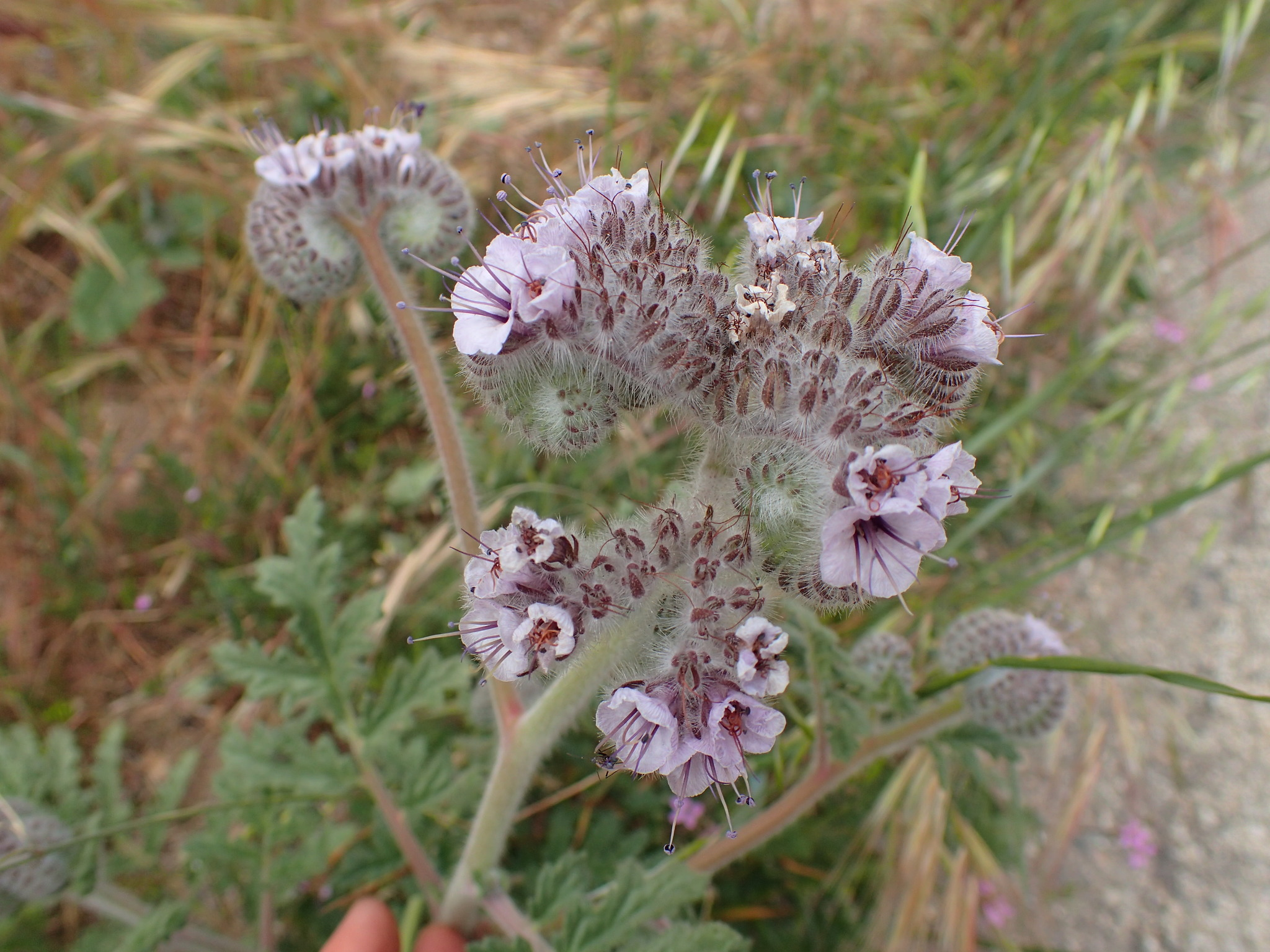

Scientific classification
- Kingdom: Plantae
- Clade: Tracheophytes
- Clade: Angiosperms
- Clade: Eudicots
- Clade: Asterids
- Order: Boraginales
- Family: Hydrophyllaceae
- Genus: Phacelia
- Species: P. hubbyi

Binomial name
- Phacelia hubbyi (J.F. Macbr.) L.M. Garrison, 2009

Synonyms
- Phacelia cicutaria var. hubbyi

= Phacelia hubbyi =

Species of plant

Phacelia hubbyi, also known as Hubby's phacelia, caterpillar phacelia, or caterpillar scorpionweed is a species of plant endemic to California. Found in the southern coastal counties of Santa Barbara, Ventura, Los Angeles, and Orange, it favors rocky or gravelly areas in chaparral and coastal scrub or the grasslands of the foothills. P. hubbyi was previously considered a subtype of Phacelia cicutaria but was set apart as a separate species in 2009. Phacelia hubbyi is distinguished by "a more robust habit, denser inflorescences, absence of mottled marks on the corollas, and longer stamens and styles."
