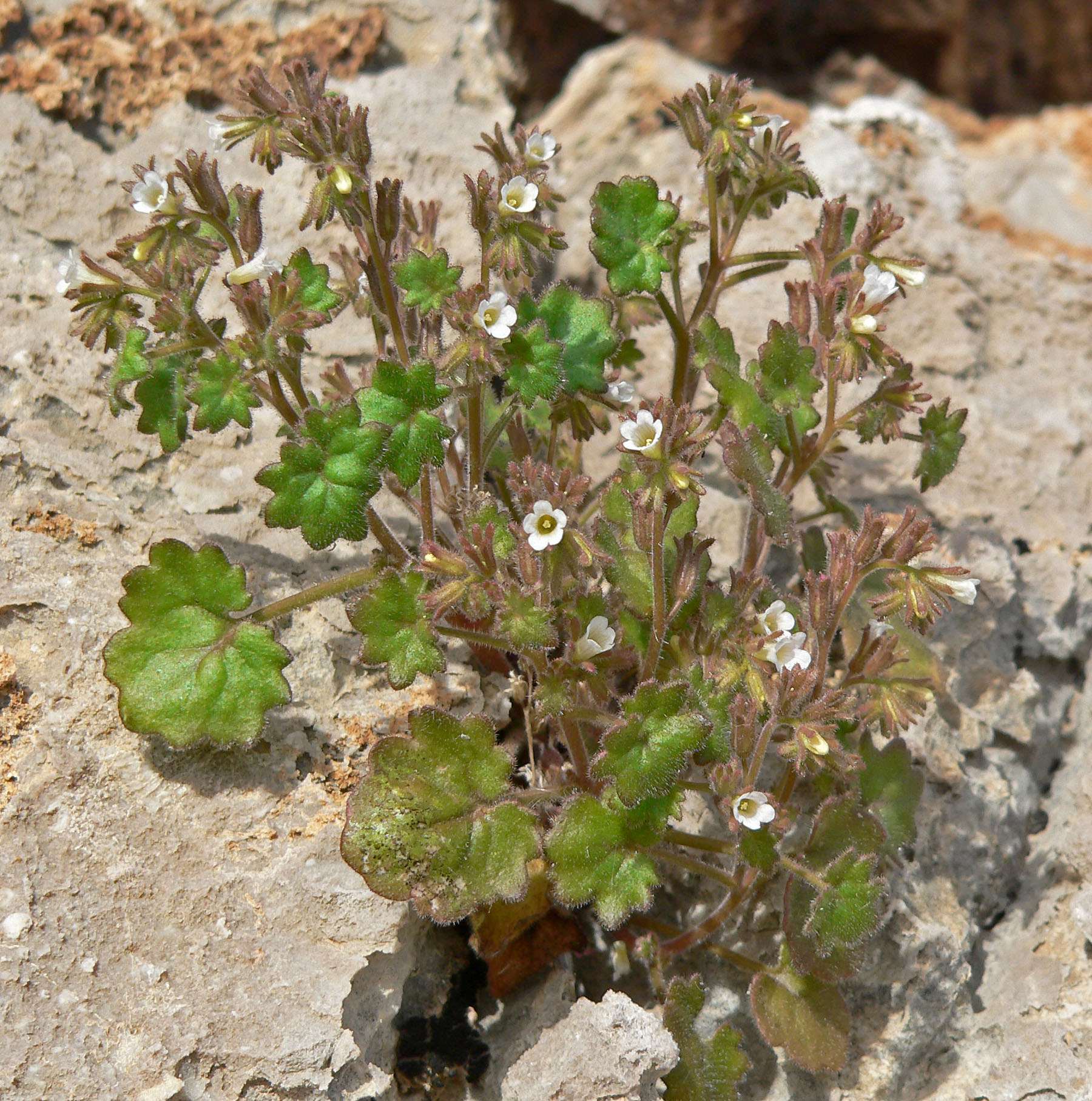

Conservation status
- Secure (NatureServe)

Scientific classification
- Kingdom: Plantae
- Clade: Tracheophytes
- Clade: Angiosperms
- Clade: Eudicots
- Clade: Asterids
- Order: Boraginales
- Family: Hydrophyllaceae
- Genus: Phacelia
- Species: P. rotundifolia

Binomial name
- Phacelia rotundifolia Torr. ex S.Watson

= Phacelia rotundifolia =

Species of plant

Phacelia rotundifolia is a species of flowering plant in the family Hydrophyllaceae, known by the common name roundleaf phacelia. It is native to the southwestern United States, where it can be found in habitat types such as creosote bush scrub and pinyon-juniper woodland.

It is an annual herb growing decumbent to erect, up to 28 centimeters tall. It is glandular and coated in short, stiff hairs. The leaves are conspicuously rounded and have scalloped edges or dull teeth. The round leaf blade is borne on a petiole. The hairy inflorescence is a one-sided curving or coiling cyme of bell-shaped flowers. Each flower is roughly half a centimeter long and white to purple in color with a pale yellow throat.
