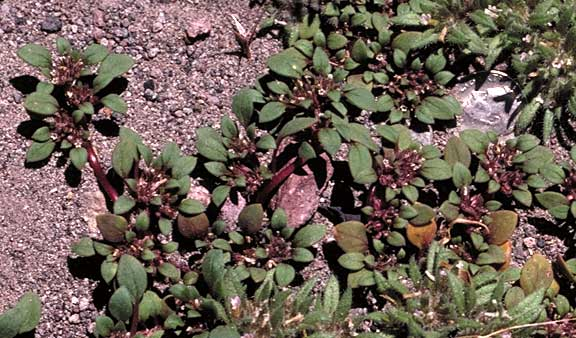

Conservation status
- Critically Imperiled (NatureServe)

Scientific classification
- Kingdom: Plantae
- Clade: Tracheophytes
- Clade: Angiosperms
- Clade: Eudicots
- Clade: Asterids
- Order: Boraginales
- Family: Hydrophyllaceae
- Genus: Phacelia
- Species: P. cookei

Binomial name
- Phacelia cookei Constance & Heckard

= Phacelia cookei =

Species of plant

Phacelia cookei is a rare species of phacelia known by the common name Cooke's phacelia. It is endemic to Siskiyou County, California, where it is known from just a few occurrences in the forest and scrub around Mount Shasta. The substrate in the area is sandy, ashy volcanic soil.

It is an annual herb growing in a small, flat mat or with a short upright stem a few centimeters high. It is blue-green in color, succulent, and lightly hairy. The oval, smooth-edged leaves are one or two centimeters long and borne on short petioles. The hairy inflorescence is a one-sided curving or coiling cyme of several tiny bell-shaped flowers. Each flower is white with lavender veining, about half a millimeter wide and no more than 2 millimeters long.
