= Phacelia adenophora =

Conservation status
- Vulnerable (NatureServe)

Scientific classification
- Kingdom: Plantae
- Clade: Tracheophytes
- Clade: Angiosperms
- Clade: Eudicots
- Clade: Asterids
- Order: Boraginales
- Family: Hydrophyllaceae
- Genus: Phacelia
- Species: P. adenophora

Binomial name
- Phacelia adenophora J.T.Howell

Species of plant

Phacelia adenophora is a species of phacelia known by the common name glandular yellow phacelia. It is native to the northwestern United States where it can be found in Oregon, northeastern California, and northwestern Nevada. It grows in mountain and plateau habitat. This is an annual herb producing decumbent, creeping, spreading, or upright branched stems up to 40 centimeters long. The leaves are oblong in shape and deeply lobed, measuring up to 3 centimeters long, and concentrated at the base. The inflorescence is a one-sided cyme of many bell-shaped flowers each under 1 cm long. The petals are fused at the base with five lobes. Unlike many phacelias, which bloom in shades of blue and purple, this species has yellow to golden flowers. It occasionally has purple edges on the corolla. It has five hairy stamens. The fruit is a fuzzy, oblong capsule a few millimeters in length containing up to 14 seeds.

The species prefers slightly alkaline regions. It blooms in early summer.
