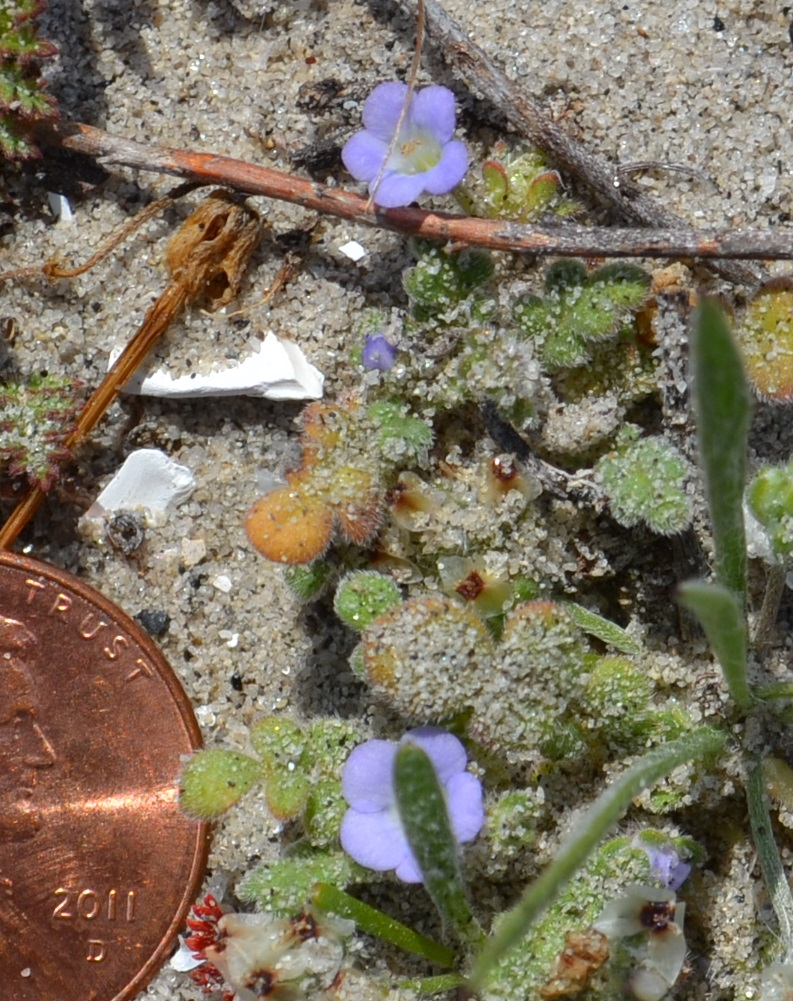

Conservation status
- Critically Imperiled (NatureServe)

Scientific classification
- Kingdom: Plantae
- Clade: Tracheophytes
- Clade: Angiosperms
- Clade: Eudicots
- Clade: Asterids
- Order: Boraginales
- Family: Hydrophyllaceae
- Genus: Phacelia
- Species: P. stellaris

Binomial name
- Phacelia stellaris Brand

= Phacelia stellaris =

Species of plant

Phacelia stellaris is a rare species of flowering plant in the family Hydrophyllaceae, known by the common names star phacelia and Brand's phacelia.

== Endangered habitat ==
It is native to coastal sage scrub and beach dunes on the coast of southern California and Baja California, where it is known from only a few occurrences. Its status is uncertain, as most of its recorded occurrences are in areas that have since been disturbed or degraded in this highly developed coastal region. There are confirmed populations around San Diego and along the Santa Ana River. The plant is a current candidate for federal protection as a threatened or endangered species in the United States.

== Description ==
Phacelia stellaris is an annual herb producing a spreading, branching stem up to about 25 centimeters long and lightly hairy in texture. The leaves are lance-shaped to oval with lobed edges, sometimes divided into smaller leaflets. The hairy inflorescence is a one-sided curving or coiling cyme of bell-shaped flowers, each roughly half a centimeter long. The five-lobed flowers are pale blue or purple in color.

== See also ==
- California chaparral and woodlands
- California coastal sage and chaparral ecoregion
