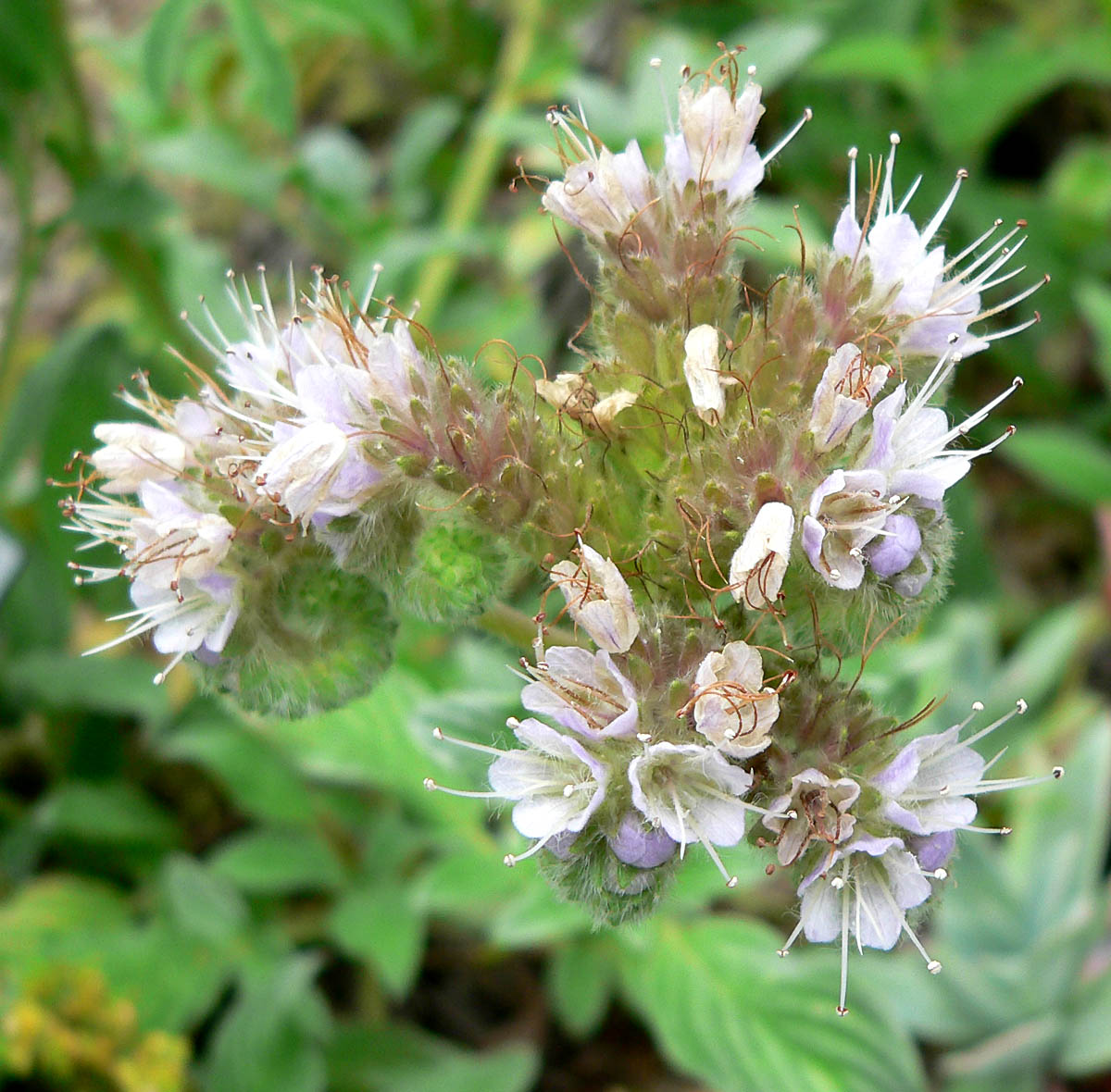

Conservation status
- Imperiled (NatureServe)

Scientific classification
- Kingdom: Plantae
- Clade: Tracheophytes
- Clade: Angiosperms
- Clade: Eudicots
- Clade: Asterids
- Order: Boraginales
- Family: Hydrophyllaceae
- Genus: Phacelia
- Species: P. argentea

Binomial name
- Phacelia argentea A.Nelson & J.F.Macbr.

= Phacelia argentea =

Species of plant

Phacelia argentea is a rare species of phacelia known by the common names sand dune phacelia and silvery phacelia. It is native to the coastline of southwestern Oregon and far northwestern California, where it was counted at a total of 33 sites in 1995. It is the only phacelia species endemic to coastal sand dune habitat, an ecosystem which is altered and declining in the area.

This is a hairy, fleshy perennial herb growing prostrate or upright to a maximum length near 45 centimeters. The leaves are thick and coated in long, straight, silvery hairs. They are roughly oval, pointed or rounded at the tips, and up to 12 centimeters long. The inflorescence is an array of one-sided coiling cymes of many bell-shaped flowers each about half a centimeter long. The flower is white or cream with whiskery protruding stamens.

The flowers are pollinated by honey bees, bumble bees, and a local native leafcutter bee (Anthidium palliventre).

A main threat to this rare species is the presence of the introduced non-native European beachgrass (Ammophila arenaria), which was once planted to stabilize the sand dunes and now dominates.
