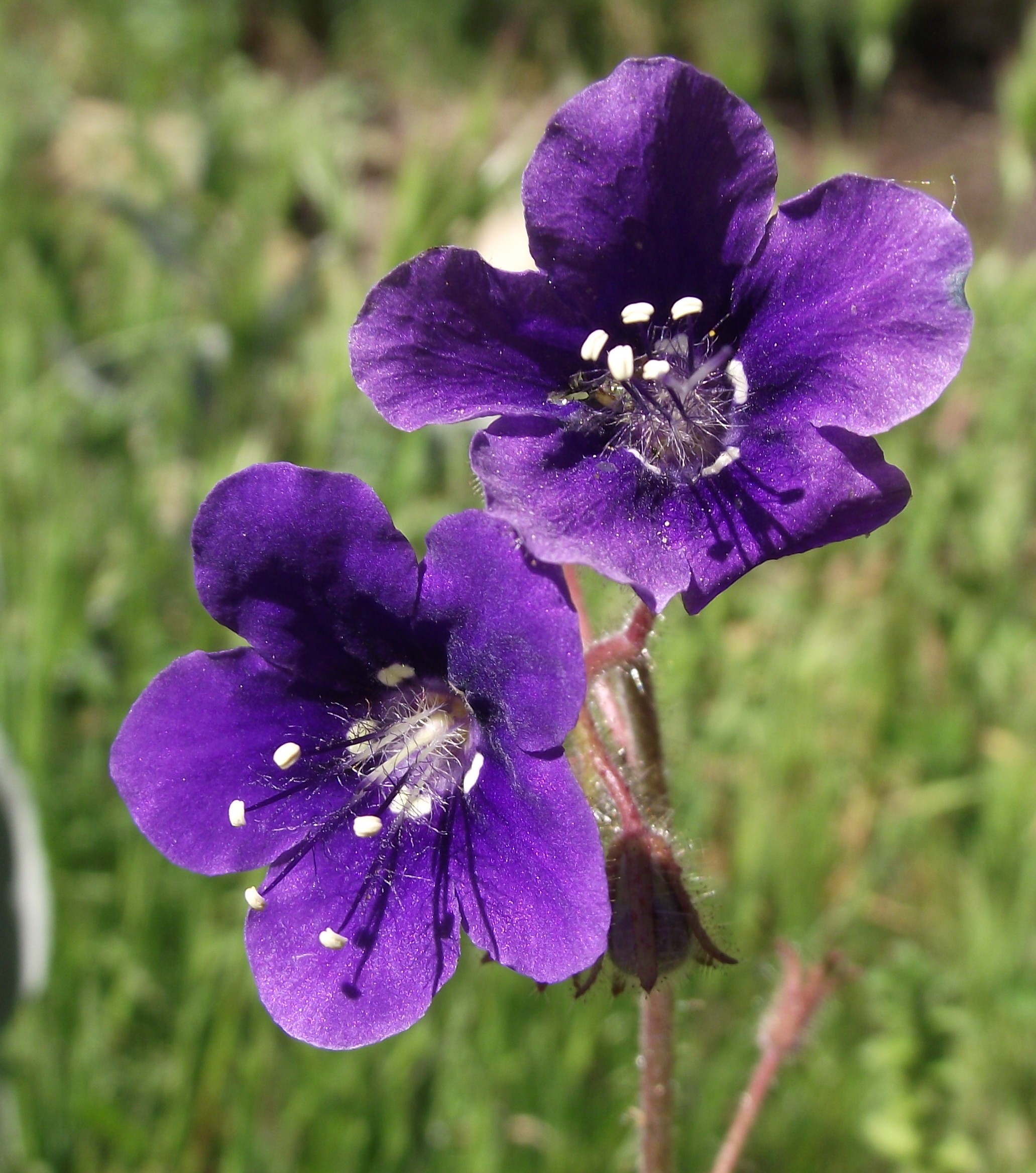

Scientific classification
- Kingdom: Plantae
- Clade: Tracheophytes
- Clade: Angiosperms
- Clade: Eudicots
- Clade: Asterids
- Order: Boraginales
- Family: Boraginaceae
- Genus: Phacelia
- Species: P. parryi

Binomial name
- Phacelia parryi Torr.

= Phacelia parryi =

Species of flowering plant

Phacelia parryi is a species of phacelia known by the common name Parry's phacelia.

== Distribution ==
It is native to southern California and Baja California, where it grows in coastal and inland mountain ranges and deserts. Its range may extend into Arizona. It grows in many types of local habitat, such as coastal sage scrub, chaparral, and open, recently burned slopes.

== Description ==
Phacelia parryi is an annual herb growing a mostly erect stem 10 to 70 centimeters long. It is glandular and coated in soft and stiff hairs. The leaves are up to 12 centimeters long with toothed oval blades borne on petioles.

The inflorescence is a cyme of widely bell-shaped flowers each 1 to 2 centimeters long. The flower is purple in color, sometimes with pale coloration in the throat, and an arrangement of five white spots. The five protruding stamens are hairy and tipped with white anthers.

== See also ==
- California chaparral and woodlands
- California coastal sage and chaparral ecoregion
