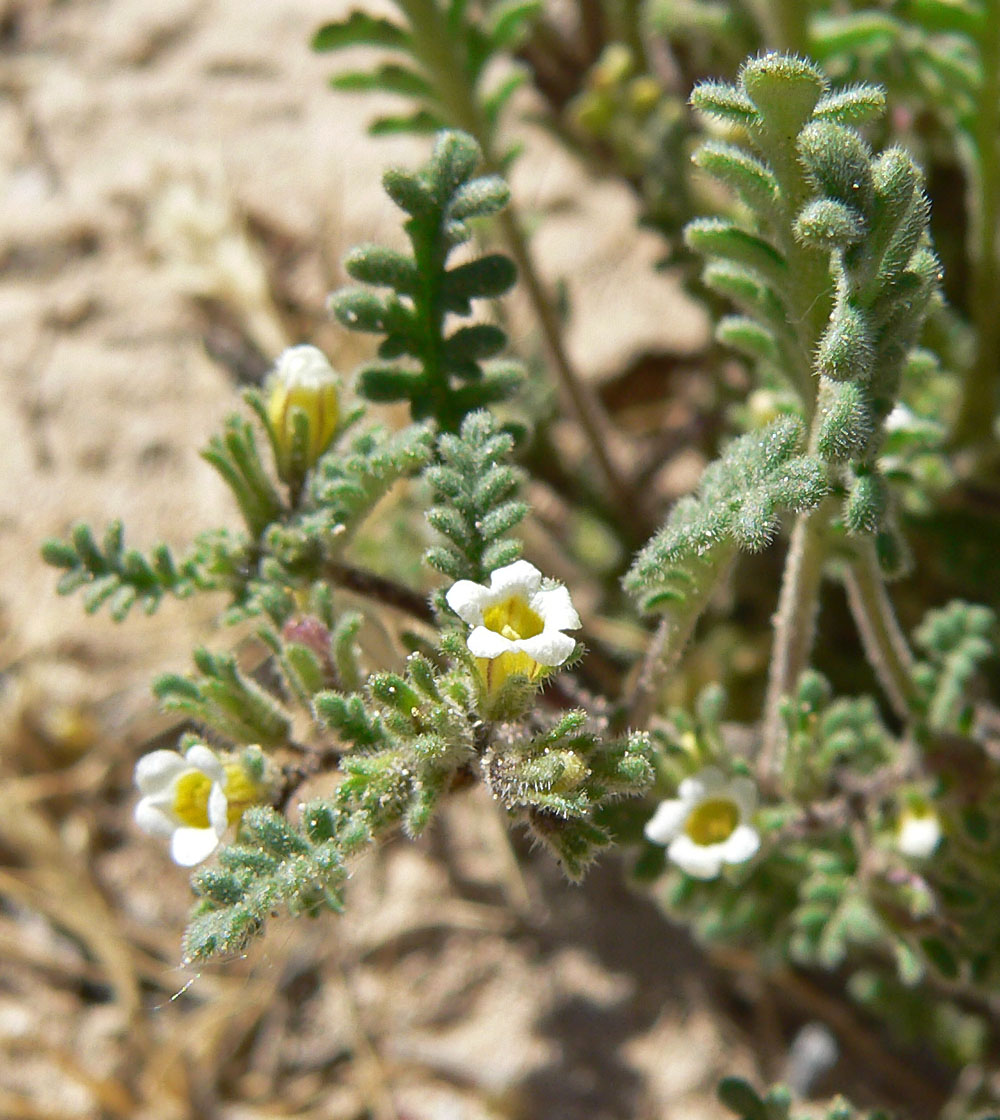

Conservation status
- Secure (NatureServe)

Scientific classification
- Kingdom: Plantae
- Clade: Tracheophytes
- Clade: Angiosperms
- Clade: Eudicots
- Clade: Asterids
- Order: Boraginales
- Family: Hydrophyllaceae
- Genus: Phacelia
- Species: P. ivesiana

Binomial name
- Phacelia ivesiana Torr.

= Phacelia ivesiana =

Species of plant

Phacelia ivesiana is a species of flowering plant in the family Hydrophyllaceae. Its common names include Ives' phacelia and Ives' scorpionweed. It is divided into varieties that have been called sticky scorpionweed. It is native to the western United States.

== Description ==
Phacelia ivesiana is an aromatic annual herb growing up to about 25 centimeters in maximum height. It has a branching, spreading, hairy stem which is often glandular. The leaves are up to 6 centimeters long and deeply lobed or divided into segments. The inflorescence is a cyme of bell-shaped flowers each only about 4 millimeters long. The flowers are white with tubular yellow throats. The fruit is a beaked capsule a few millimeters long.
