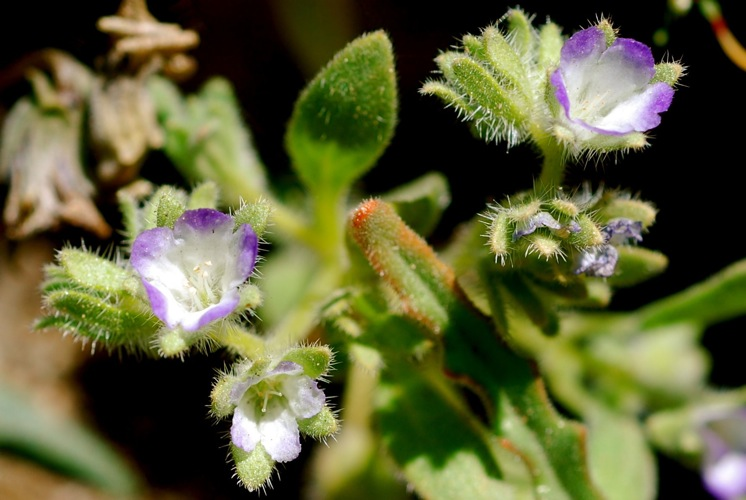

Conservation status
- Secure (NatureServe)

Scientific classification
- Kingdom: Plantae
- Clade: Tracheophytes
- Clade: Angiosperms
- Clade: Eudicots
- Clade: Asterids
- Order: Boraginales
- Family: Hydrophyllaceae
- Genus: Phacelia
- Species: P. curvipes

Binomial name
- Phacelia curvipes Greene

= Phacelia curvipes =

Species of plant

Phacelia curvipes is a species of flowering plant in the family Hydrophyllaceae, known by the common names Washoe phacelia and Washoe scorpionweed. It is native to the southwestern United States, where it grows in many types of habitat, such as chaparral, oak and pine woodland, and forests.

== Description ==
Phacelia curvipes is an annual herb producing a small, branching stem up to about 15 centimeters long. It is glandular and hairy in texture. The leaves are oval or lance-shaped, 1 to 4 centimeters long, and borne on petioles. The hairy inflorescence is a cyme of several flowers. The flower has a bell-shaped or rounded, flattened corolla under a centimeter long. It is blue or purple with a white throat.
