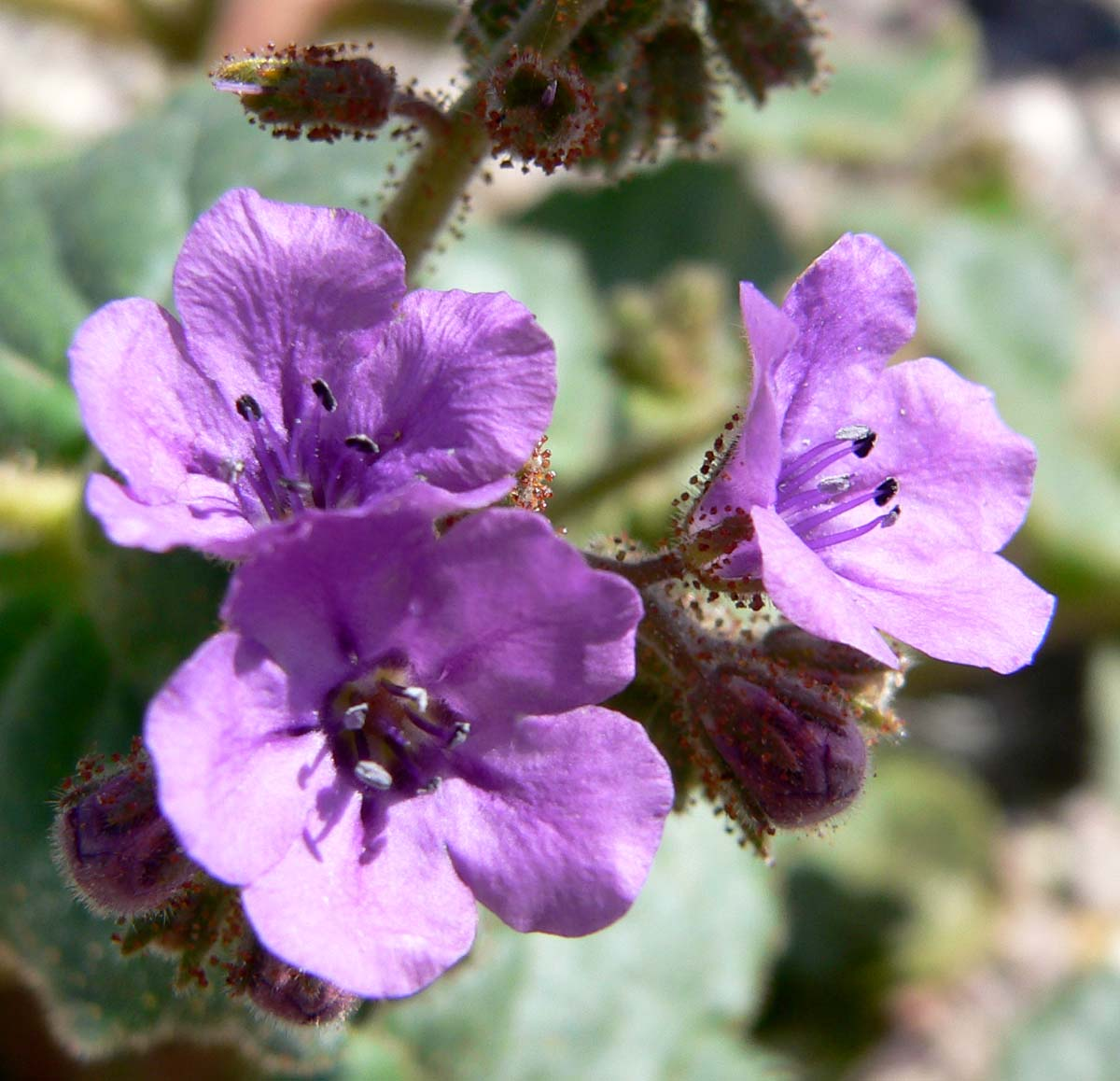

Scientific classification
- Kingdom: Plantae
- Clade: Tracheophytes
- Clade: Angiosperms
- Clade: Eudicots
- Clade: Asterids
- Order: Boraginales
- Family: Hydrophyllaceae
- Genus: Phacelia
- Species: P. calthifolia

Binomial name
- Phacelia calthifolia Brand

= Phacelia calthifolia =

Species of plant

Phacelia calthifolia (calthaleaf phacelia or caltha-leaved phacelia), is a flowering plant in the family Hydrophyllaceae. It is native to the Mojave Desert in southeastern California and western Nevada, between Barstow, California, and the Death Valley area, where it occurs below 1,000 m in sandy soils.

It is an annual plant growing to 30 cm tall, with bristly stems. The leaves are dark green, rounded to heart-shaped with a notched base, 1–3 cm long and wide, with an entire or serrated margin. The flowers are bell-shaped, about 1 cm diameter, purple to violet in color.
