= Ethmia macelhosiella =

Scientific classification
- Domain: Eukaryota
- Kingdom: Animalia
- Phylum: Arthropoda
- Class: Insecta
- Order: Lepidoptera
- Family: Depressariidae
- Genus: Ethmia
- Species: E. macelhosiella

Binomial name
- Ethmia macelhosiella Busck, 1907

Species of moth

Ethmia macelhosiella is a moth in the family Depressariidae. It is found in the United States, including Missouri, Maryland, Pennsylvania and Oklahoma.

The length of the forewings is 10.7–12.7 mm (0.42–0.50 in). The ground color of the forewings is whitish, sparsely to densely irrorated (speckled) with pale brownish. The ground color of the hindwings is pale brownish or dirty whitish. Adults have been recorded in October and November.

The larvae feed on Phacelia species. They select cracks in or bore into the bark of logs or trees to pupate.
