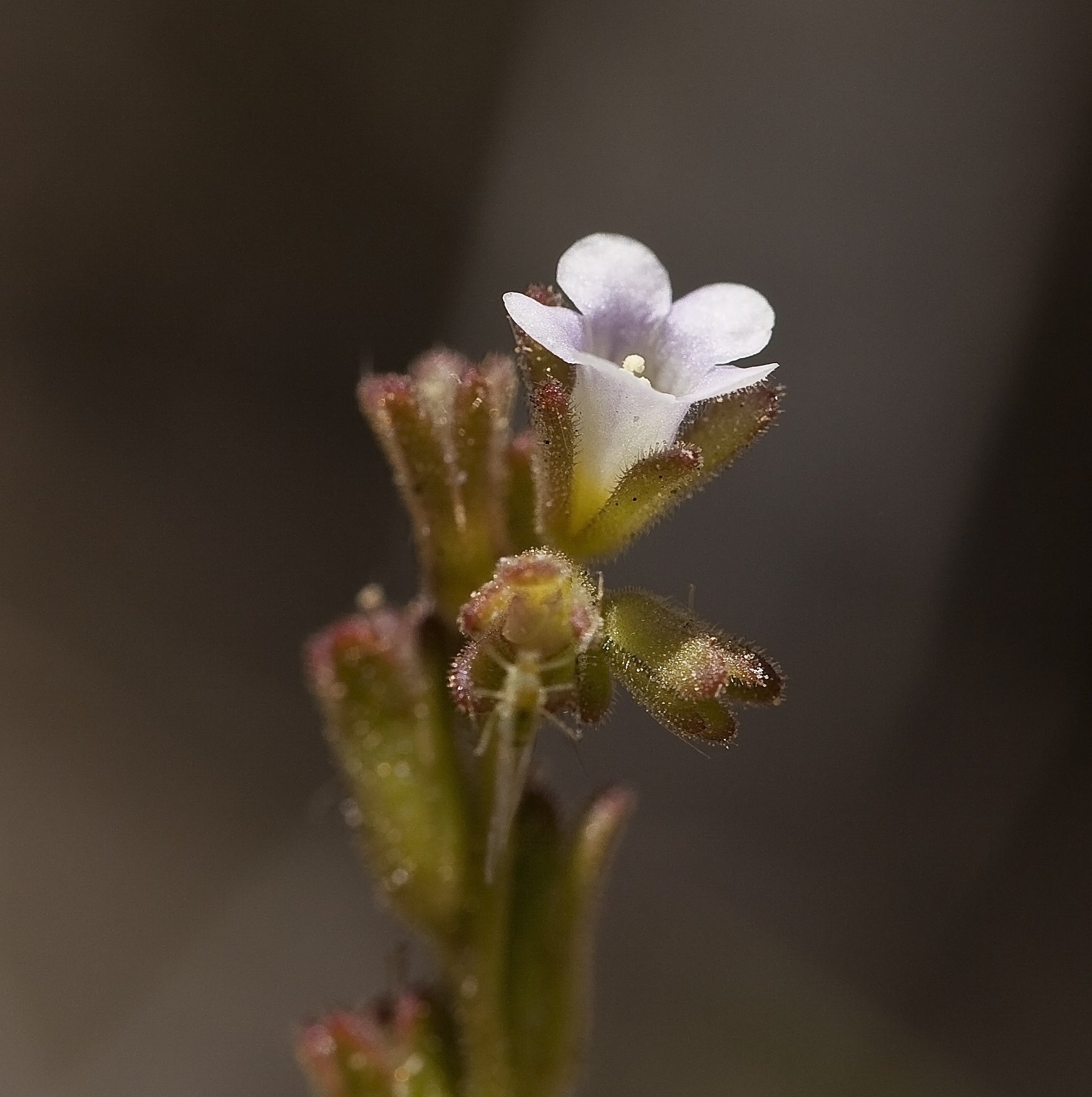

Conservation status
- Secure (NatureServe)

Scientific classification
- Kingdom: Plantae
- Clade: Tracheophytes
- Clade: Angiosperms
- Clade: Eudicots
- Clade: Asterids
- Order: Boraginales
- Family: Hydrophyllaceae
- Genus: Phacelia
- Species: P. lemmonii

Binomial name
- Phacelia lemmonii A.Gray

= Phacelia lemmonii =

Species of plant

Phacelia lemmonii is a species of phacelia known by the common name Lemmon's phacelia. It is native to the southwestern United States, where it grows in mountain and sandy desert habitat.

== Description ==
Phacelia lemmonii is an annual herb producing a branching or unbranched stem up to about 20 centimeters in maximum height. It is glandular and lightly hairy in texture. The lobed oval leaves are 1 to 4 centimeters long. The glandular, hairy inflorescence is a one-sided curving or coiling cyme of bell-shaped flowers. Each flower is about half a centimeter long and white to pale lavender with a tubular yellow throat.
