= Phacelia austromontana =

Scientific classification
- Kingdom: Plantae
- Clade: Tracheophytes
- Clade: Angiosperms
- Clade: Eudicots
- Clade: Asterids
- Order: Boraginales
- Family: Hydrophyllaceae
- Genus: Phacelia
- Species: P. austromontana

Binomial name
- Phacelia austromontana J.T.Howell

Synonyms
- Phacelia lobata

Species of plant

Phacelia austromontana is a species of phacelia known by the common name Southern Sierra phacelia. It is native to the southwestern United States, where it can be found in the Transverse Ranges and Sierra Nevada of California east to Utah. It grows in open mountainous habitat.

It is an annual herb growing prostrate or upright, its multibranched stem reaching up to about 27 centimeters long. It is glandular and coated in soft and coarse hairs. The lance-shaped to oval pointed leaves are 1 to 3 centimeters long and have few or no lobes. The hairy, glandular inflorescence is a one-sided curving or coiling cyme of many bell-shaped flowers. Each flower is lavender or light blue and no more than 6 millimeters long.
