= Phacelia rattanii =

Scientific classification
- Kingdom: Plantae
- Clade: Tracheophytes
- Clade: Angiosperms
- Clade: Eudicots
- Clade: Asterids
- Order: Boraginales
- Family: Hydrophyllaceae
- Genus: Phacelia
- Species: P. rattanii

Binomial name
- Phacelia rattanii A.Gray

Species of plant

Phacelia rattanii is a species of phacelia known by the common name Rattan's phacelia.

It is native to northern California, Nevada, and the West Coast of the United States. It can be found in mountain and foothill habitats, in shaded crevices and on steep slopes.

== Description ==
Phacelia rattanii is an annual herb growing 15 centimeters to one meter in maximum stem length, taking an erect, branching form. It is glandular and coated in stiff hairs and bristles with bulbous bases. The leaves are oval, toothed or lobed, and up to about 7 centimeters long. The hairy inflorescence is a one-sided curving or coiling cyme of bell-shaped flowers each no more than half a centimeter long. The flowers are white to light blue and are surrounded by calyces of sepals coated in long hairs.
