= Phacelia racemosa =

Scientific classification
- Kingdom: Plantae
- Clade: Tracheophytes
- Clade: Angiosperms
- Clade: Eudicots
- Clade: Asterids
- Order: Boraginales
- Family: Hydrophyllaceae
- Genus: Phacelia
- Species: P. racemosa

Binomial name
- Phacelia racemosa (Kellogg) Brandeg.

Species of plant

Phacelia racemosa

Phacelia racemosa is a species of phacelia known by the common name racemose phacelia.

It is endemic to California, where it can be found in the Sierra Nevada and adjacent slopes and peaks in the southernmost Cascade Range. It grows in coniferous forests in gravelly and rocky substrates.

== Description ==
Phacelia racemosa is an annual herb growing erect with a stem reaching up to 18 centimeters tall. The leaves are linear or lance-shaped and measure 1 to 4 centimeters long.

The inflorescence is a one-sided curving or coiling cyme of small bell-shaped flowers. Each flower is under half a centimeter long, pale blue to nearly white in color, and surrounded by a calyx of long, narrow sepals.
