= Phacelia eisenii =

Scientific classification
- Kingdom: Plantae
- Clade: Tracheophytes
- Clade: Angiosperms
- Clade: Eudicots
- Clade: Asterids
- Order: Boraginales
- Family: Hydrophyllaceae
- Genus: Phacelia
- Species: P. eisenii

Binomial name
- Phacelia eisenii Brandeg.

Species of flowering plant

Phacelia eisenii is a species of phacelia known by the common name Eisen's phacelia. It is endemic to California, where it occurs only in the Sierra Nevada and its foothills, as well as the adjacent Tehachapi Mountains. It grows in mountain habitat such as coniferous forests.

== Description ==
Phacelia eisenii is an annual herb growing erect up to 10 or 15 centimeters (4 or 6 in) in maximum height. It is glandular and hairy in texture. The leaves are lance-shaped to oval and 1 or 2 centimeters (2/5 or 4/5 in) in length.

The hairy inflorescence is a small one-sided curving or coiling cyme of bell-shaped flowers. Each flower is under one-half centimeter (1/4 in) long and is white to pale lavender in color.
