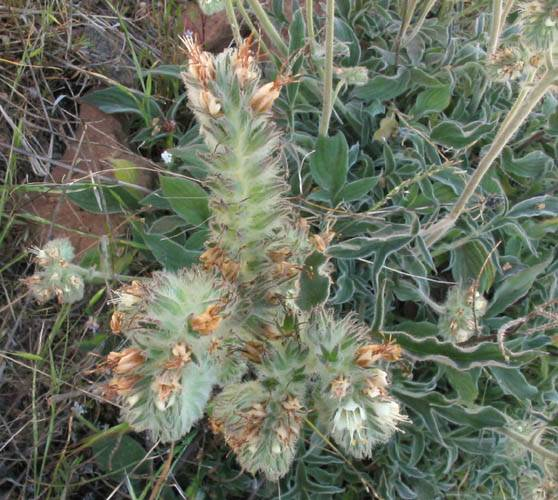

Scientific classification
- Kingdom: Plantae
- Clade: Tracheophytes
- Clade: Angiosperms
- Clade: Eudicots
- Clade: Asterids
- Order: Boraginales
- Family: Hydrophyllaceae
- Genus: Phacelia
- Species: P. imbricata

Binomial name
- Phacelia imbricata Greene

= Phacelia imbricata =

Species of plant

Phacelia imbricata is a species of phacelia known by the common name imbricate phacelia. It is native to much of California and Baja California, where it can be found in varied habitat in mountains, desert, valleys, and coastline.

== Description ==
Phacelia imbricata is a perennial herb growing decumbent or erect to a maximum height exceeding one meter. It is glandular and coated in stiff hairs. The leaves may be up to 15 centimeters long and are divided into several leaflets. The inflorescence is a one-sided curving or coiling cyme of many bell-shaped flowers. The flower is roughly half a centimeter long and white to pale purple in color.
