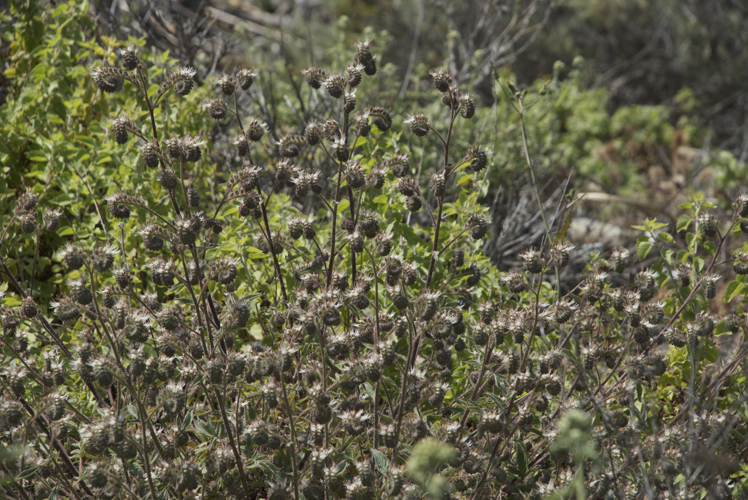

Scientific classification
- Kingdom: Plantae
- Clade: Tracheophytes
- Clade: Angiosperms
- Clade: Eudicots
- Clade: Asterids
- Order: Boraginales
- Family: Hydrophyllaceae
- Genus: Phacelia
- Species: P. egena

Binomial name
- Phacelia egena (Greene ex Brand) Greene ex J.T.Howell

Synonyms
- Phacelia magellanica

= Phacelia egena =

Species of flowering plant

Phacelia egena is a species of phacelia known by the common name Kaweah River phacelia. It is native to much of California, from the Transverse Ranges to the northern mountains and into Oregon; it also occurs in Arizona. It grows in many types of habitat.

== Description ==
Phacelia egena is a herb producing a hairy, erect stem up to about 60 centimeters in maximum height. Most of the lance-shaped leaves are located low on stem, the largest over 20 centimeters long and divided into many leaflets. Leaves higher on the stem are much smaller and undivided.

The inflorescence is a one-sided curving or coiling cyme of several bell-shaped flowers. The flower is just under a centimeter long and is white to cream in color with five protruding white stamens.
