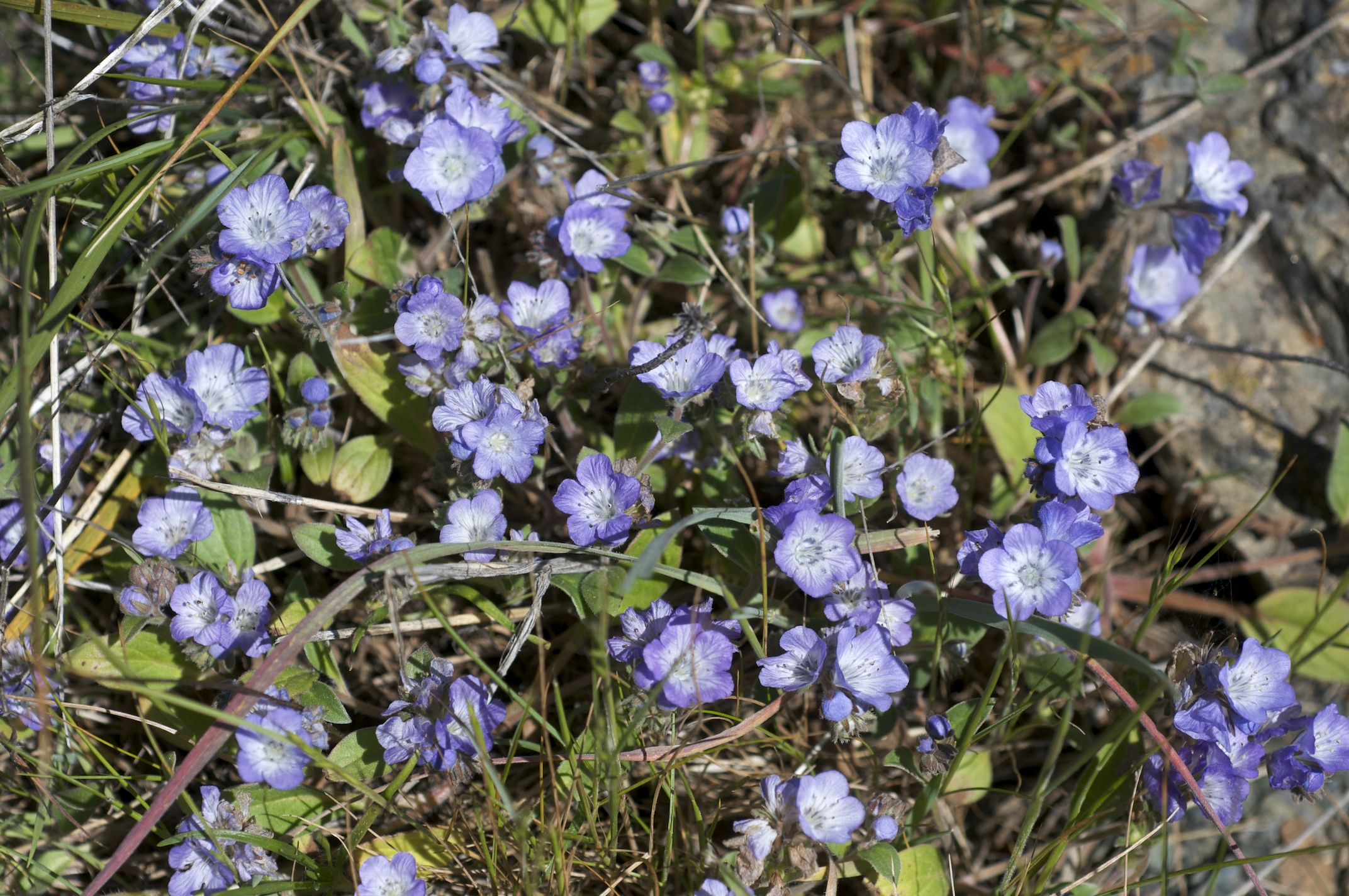

Scientific classification
- Kingdom: Plantae
- Clade: Tracheophytes
- Clade: Angiosperms
- Clade: Eudicots
- Clade: Asterids
- Order: Boraginales
- Family: Hydrophyllaceae
- Genus: Phacelia
- Species: P. divaricata

Binomial name
- Phacelia divaricata (Benth.) A.Gray

= Phacelia divaricata =

Species of plant

Phacelia divaricata is a species of phacelia known by the common name divaricate phacelia. It is endemic to California, where it grows in the coastal hills and mountain ranges around the San Francisco Bay Area and to the north. It grows in chaparral, woodland, grassland, and other local habitat.

== Description ==
Phacelia divaricata is an annual herb growing decumbent to erect, its branching or unbranched stem reaching 40 centimeters in maximum length. The leaves are up to 8 centimeters long, oval in shape, and lobed or smooth-edged. The hairy inflorescence is a one-sided curving or coiling cyme of several funnel- or bell-shaped flowers. The flower is 1 to 1.5 centimeters long and pale lavender in color.
