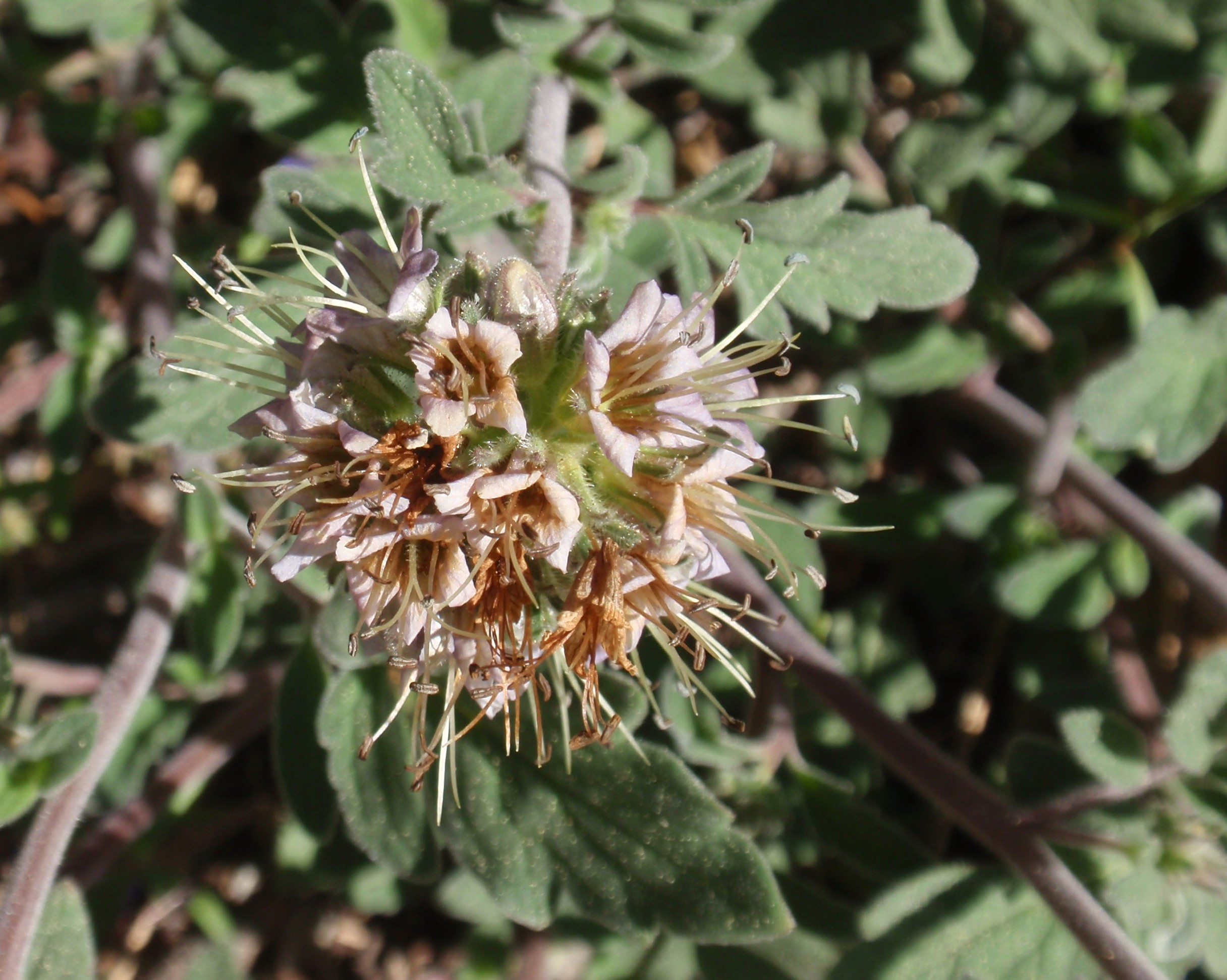

Scientific classification
- Kingdom: Plantae
- Clade: Tracheophytes
- Clade: Angiosperms
- Clade: Eudicots
- Clade: Asterids
- Order: Boraginales
- Family: Hydrophyllaceae
- Genus: Phacelia
- Species: P. hydrophylloides

Binomial name
- Phacelia hydrophylloides Torr. ex A.Gray

= Phacelia hydrophylloides =

Species of herb

Phacelia hydrophylloides is a species of phacelia known by the common name waterleaf phacelia. It is native to California, Oregon, and Nevada, where it can be found in the southern Cascade Range and the Sierra Nevada. It grows in mountain habitat such as meadows and forest.

== Description ==
Phacelia hydrophylloides is a perennial herb growing decumbent or somewhat upright with hairy stems reaching a maximum length near 30 centimeters. The toothed or lobed oval leaves are up to 6 centimeters long. The inflorescence is a dense headlike coil of several bell-shaped flowers. Each flower is under a centimeter long and whitish to purple-blue in color, with protruding stamens.
