= Phacelia marcescens =

Scientific classification
- Kingdom: Plantae
- Clade: Tracheophytes
- Clade: Angiosperms
- Clade: Eudicots
- Clade: Asterids
- Order: Boraginales
- Family: Hydrophyllaceae
- Genus: Phacelia
- Species: P. marcescens

Binomial name
- Phacelia marcescens Eastw. ex J.F.Macbr.

Species of plant

Phacelia marcescens is a species of phacelia known by the common name persistentflower phacelia. It is endemic to the Sierra Nevada and its foothills in California, where it grows in meadows, forests, and other mountain habitat.

== Description ==
Phacelia marcescens is an annual herb growing mostly erect to a maximum height near 20 centimeters. It is glandular and coated in short, stiff hairs. The leaves are 1 to 5 centimeters long, oval in shape, and smooth-edged, sometimes with small lobes near the bases of the blades. The hairy inflorescence is a one-sided curving or coiling cyme of bell-shaped flowers. Each flower is about half a centimeter long and purple in color, often with a paler throat.
