= Phacelia stebbinsii =

Scientific classification
- Kingdom: Plantae
- Clade: Tracheophytes
- Clade: Angiosperms
- Clade: Eudicots
- Clade: Asterids
- Order: Boraginales
- Family: Boraginaceae
- Genus: Phacelia
- Species: P. stebbinsii

Binomial name
- Phacelia stebbinsii Constance & Heckard

Species of plant

Phacelia stebbinsii is an uncommon species of phacelia known by the common name Stebbins' phacelia.

== Distribution ==
The plant is endemic to California, where it is known only from a northern section of the Sierra Nevada in El Dorado County. It grows at elevations from 900–2,100 metres (3,000–6,900 ft), in forests, meadows, and on rocky slopes.

== Description ==
Phacelia stebbinsii is an annual herb producing a mostly unbranched stem 10 to 40 centimeters tall. It is lightly hairy and sometimes glandular. The leaves are oval or lance-shaped and some have lobed edges.

The hairy inflorescence is a one-sided curving or coiling cyme of bell-shaped flowers. Each flower is around half a centimeter long and white to light blue in color with protruding stamens.
