= Phacelia vallicola =

Scientific classification
- Kingdom: Plantae
- Clade: Tracheophytes
- Clade: Angiosperms
- Clade: Eudicots
- Clade: Asterids
- Order: Boraginales
- Family: Hydrophyllaceae
- Genus: Phacelia
- Species: P. vallicola

Binomial name
- Phacelia vallicola Brand

Species of plant

Phacelia vallicola is a species of phacelia known by the common name mariposa phacelia. It is endemic to California, where it is known only from the Sierra Nevada and adjacent southernmost slopes of the Cascade Range. It grows in coniferous forest, chaparral, and other mountain and foothill habitat.

It is an annual herb growing erect to a maximum height around 27 centimeters. It is coated in soft and stiff hairs. The leaves are oval or lance-shaped, smooth-edged, and borne on short petioles. The hairy inflorescence is a one-sided curving or coiling cyme of bell-shaped flowers. Each flower is about half a centimeter long and purple in color with a paler purple throat.
