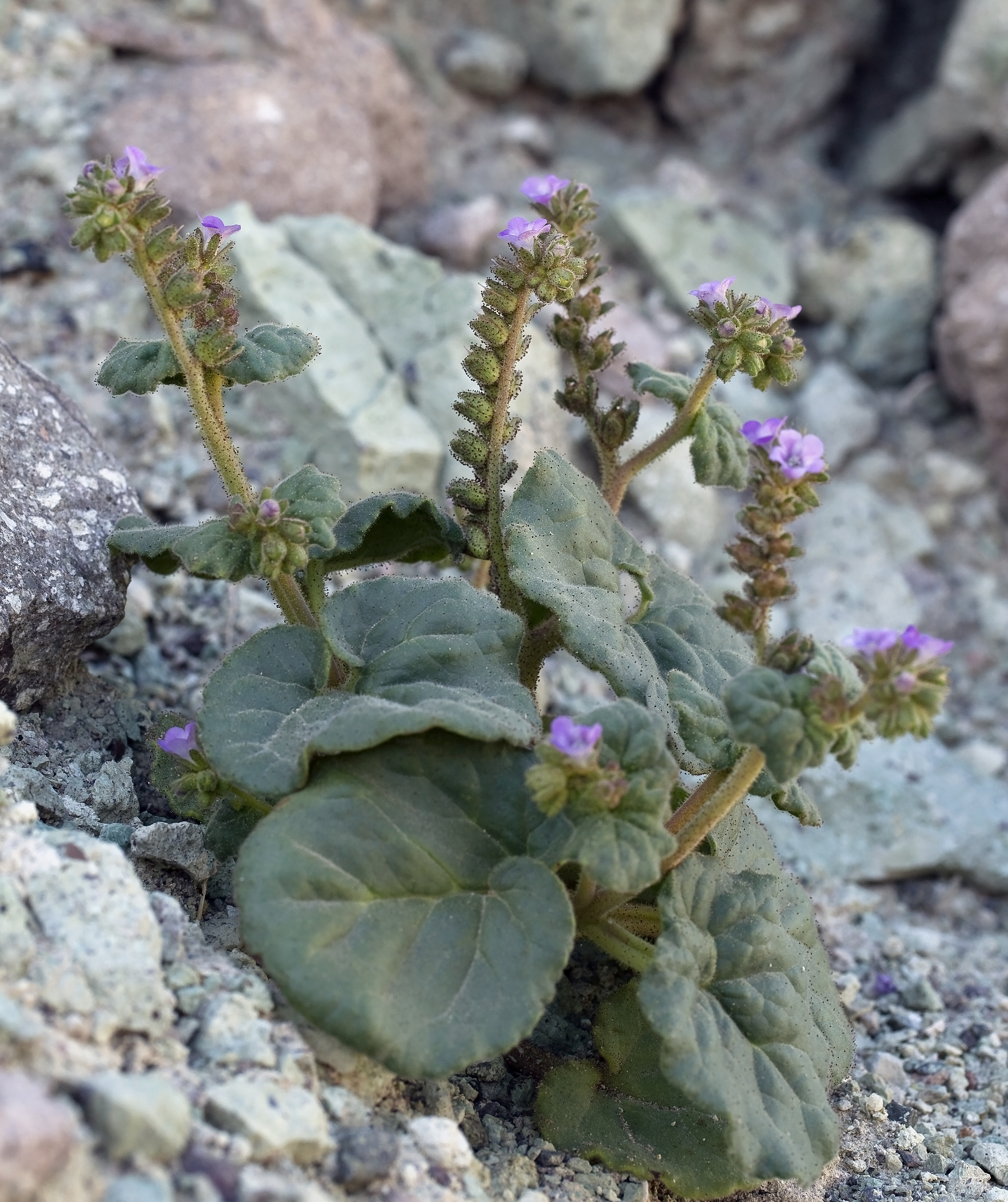

Scientific classification
- Kingdom: Plantae
- Clade: Tracheophytes
- Clade: Angiosperms
- Clade: Eudicots
- Clade: Asterids
- Order: Boraginales
- Family: Hydrophyllaceae
- Genus: Phacelia
- Species: P. pachyphylla

Binomial name
- Phacelia pachyphylla A.Gray

= Phacelia pachyphylla =

Species of plant

Phacelia pachyphylla is a species of phacelia known by the common name blacktack phacelia. It is native to the deserts of California and Baja California, where it grows in sandy alkali flats and scrub.

It is an annual herb growing erect to a maximum height around 17 centimeters. It is glandular in texture, the hairs tipped with bulbous glands. The leaves, which are mostly arranged around the base of the stem, have crinkly or wavy-edged rounded blades on petioles a few centimeters long. The hairy inflorescence is a one-sided curving or coiling cyme of funnel- or bell-shaped flowers. Each flower is about half a centimeter long and light purple in color.
