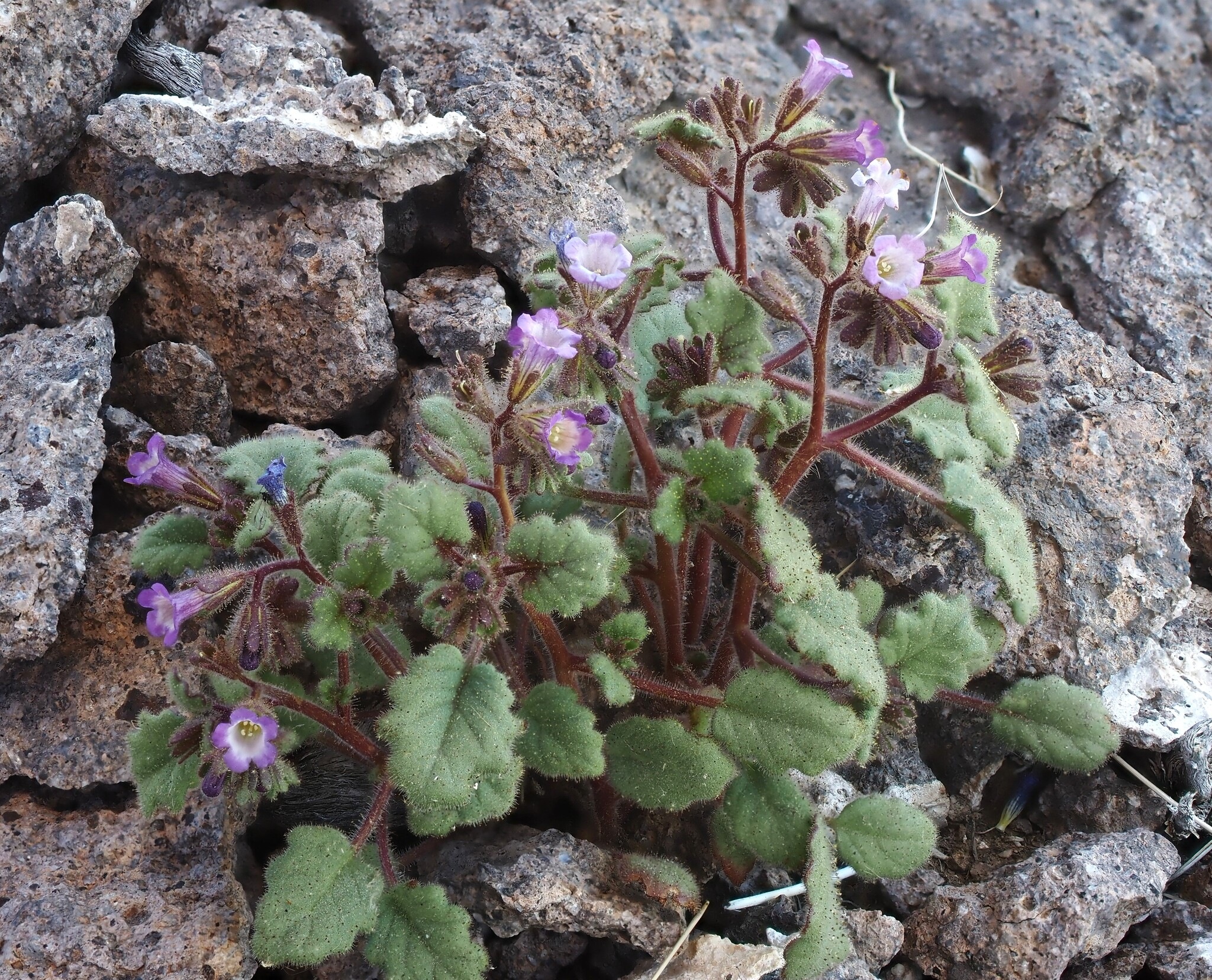

Scientific classification
- Kingdom: Plantae
- Clade: Tracheophytes
- Clade: Angiosperms
- Clade: Eudicots
- Clade: Asterids
- Order: Boraginales
- Family: Hydrophyllaceae
- Genus: Phacelia
- Species: P. mustelina

Binomial name
- Phacelia mustelina Coville

= Phacelia mustelina =

Species of plant

Phacelia mustelina is an uncommon species of phacelia known by the common names weasel phacelia and Death Valley round-leaved phacelia. It is native to the desert mountains and flats of eastern California (mainly Death Valley and Inyo County) and western Nevada (Nye County), where it grows in woodland and open scrub habitat.

It is a glandular annual herb growing decumbent or upright to a maximum height around 30 centimeters (1 ft). The toothed rounded leaves are 1 to 4 centimeters (1/3 to 1 2/3 in) long with blades borne on petioles. The hairy, glandular inflorescence is a one-sided curving or coiling cyme of bell-shaped flowers. Each flower is up to a centimeter long and deep to light purple to nearly white in color.
