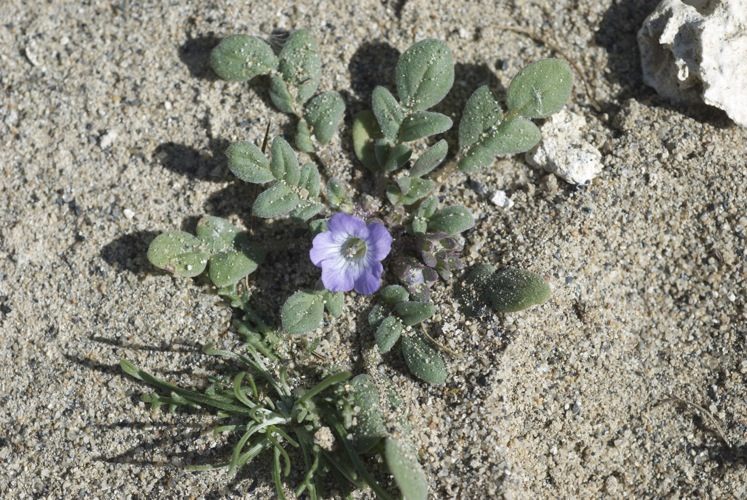

Scientific classification
- Kingdom: Plantae
- Clade: Tracheophytes
- Clade: Angiosperms
- Clade: Eudicots
- Clade: Asterids
- Order: Boraginales
- Family: Hydrophyllaceae
- Genus: Phacelia
- Species: P. douglasii

Binomial name
- Phacelia douglasii (Benth.) Torr.

= Phacelia douglasii =

Species of flowering plant

Phacelia douglasii is a species of phacelia known by the common name Douglas' phacelia. It is endemic to California, where it grows in the coastal and inland mountains and foothills, the Central Valley, and the western Mojave Desert.

== Description ==
Phacelia douglasii is an annual herb growing mostly erect to a maximum height around 40 centimeters. Most of the leaves are located low on the branching stem and are deeply lobed or divided into leaflets.

The hairy inflorescence is a one-sided curving or coiling cyme of several bell-shaped flowers. The flower may be over a centimeter long and is pale purple or bluish in color.
