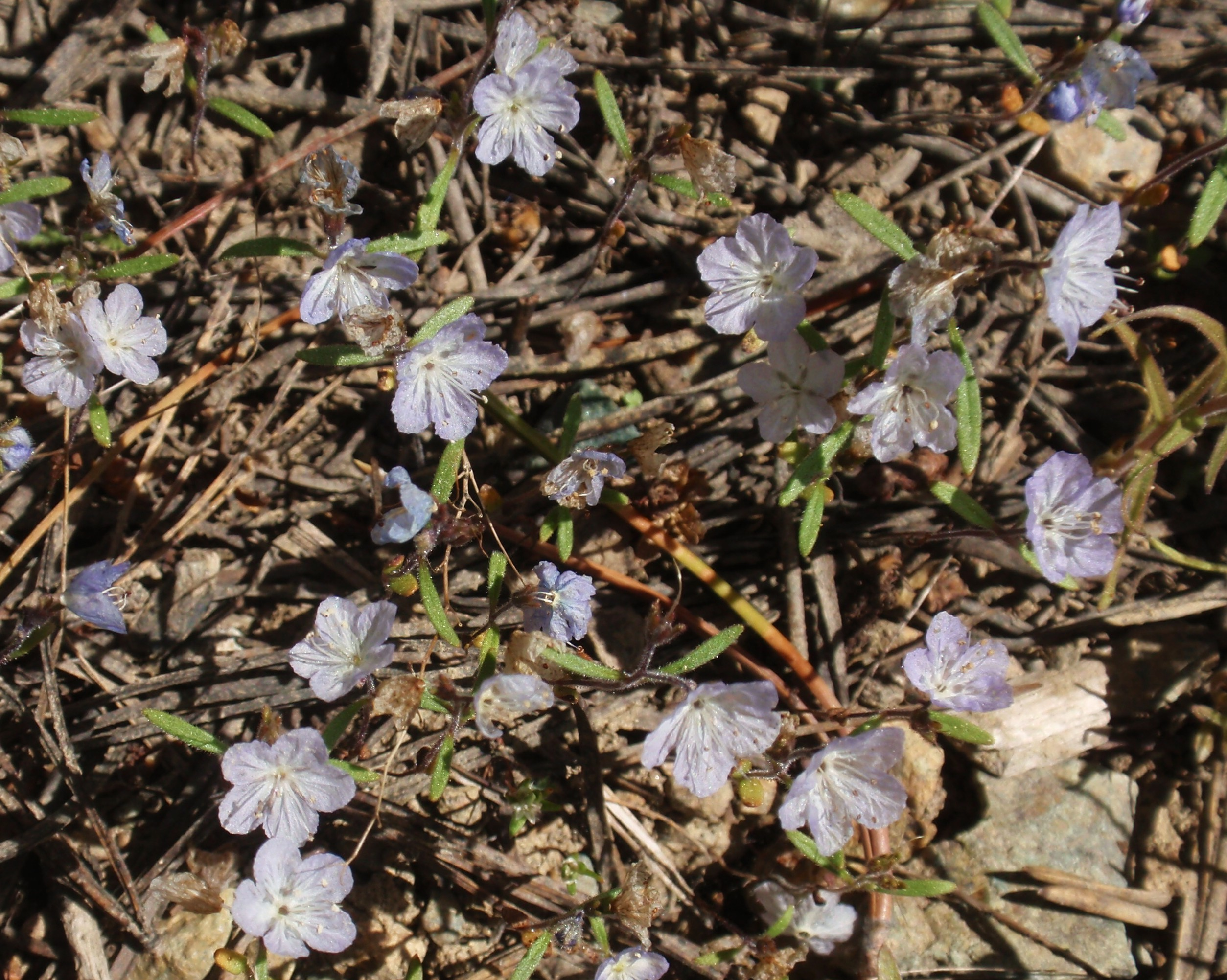

Conservation status
- Vulnerable (NatureServe)

Scientific classification
- Kingdom: Plantae
- Clade: Tracheophytes
- Clade: Angiosperms
- Clade: Eudicots
- Clade: Asterids
- Order: Boraginales
- Family: Hydrophyllaceae
- Genus: Phacelia
- Species: P. pringlei

Binomial name
- Phacelia pringlei A.Gray

= Phacelia pringlei =

Species of plant

Phacelia pringlei is a species of flowering plant in the family Hydrophyllaceae known by the common name Pringle's phacelia. It is endemic to far northern California, where it is known only from the southern Klamath Mountains. It grows in coniferous forest and open mountain slopes.

It is an annual herb producing a mostly unbranched erect stem up to 18 centimeters tall. The linear or lance-shaped leaves are up to 3 centimeters long. The hairy, glandular inflorescence is a cyme of five-lobed lavender flowers each no more than half a centimeter long.
