= Phacelia phacelioides =

Conservation status
- Critically Imperiled (NatureServe)

Scientific classification
- Kingdom: Plantae
- Clade: Tracheophytes
- Clade: Angiosperms
- Clade: Eudicots
- Clade: Asterids
- Order: Boraginales
- Family: Hydrophyllaceae
- Genus: Phacelia
- Species: P. phacelioides

Binomial name
- Phacelia phacelioides (Benth.) Brand

Species of plant

Phacelia phacelioides, the Mt. Diablo phacelia, is a species of phacelia. It is endemic to California, where it is known from about 20 occurrences in the coastal mountain ranges of the inner San Francisco Bay Area, including Mount Diablo. It is a resident of chaparral and woodland habitat.

The Mt. Diablo phacelia, Phacelia phacelioides, is an annual herb growing an upright, mostly unbranched stem up to 20 centimeters long. It is coated in soft and stiff hairs. The leaves are up to 8 or 10 centimeters long with rounded or oval blades borne on petioles. The hairy inflorescence is a one-sided curving or coiling cyme of narrow bell-shaped flowers. Each flower is roughly half a centimeter long and white to lavender in color, sometimes with darker purple streaks. It is surrounded by a calyx of long, densely hairy sepals.
