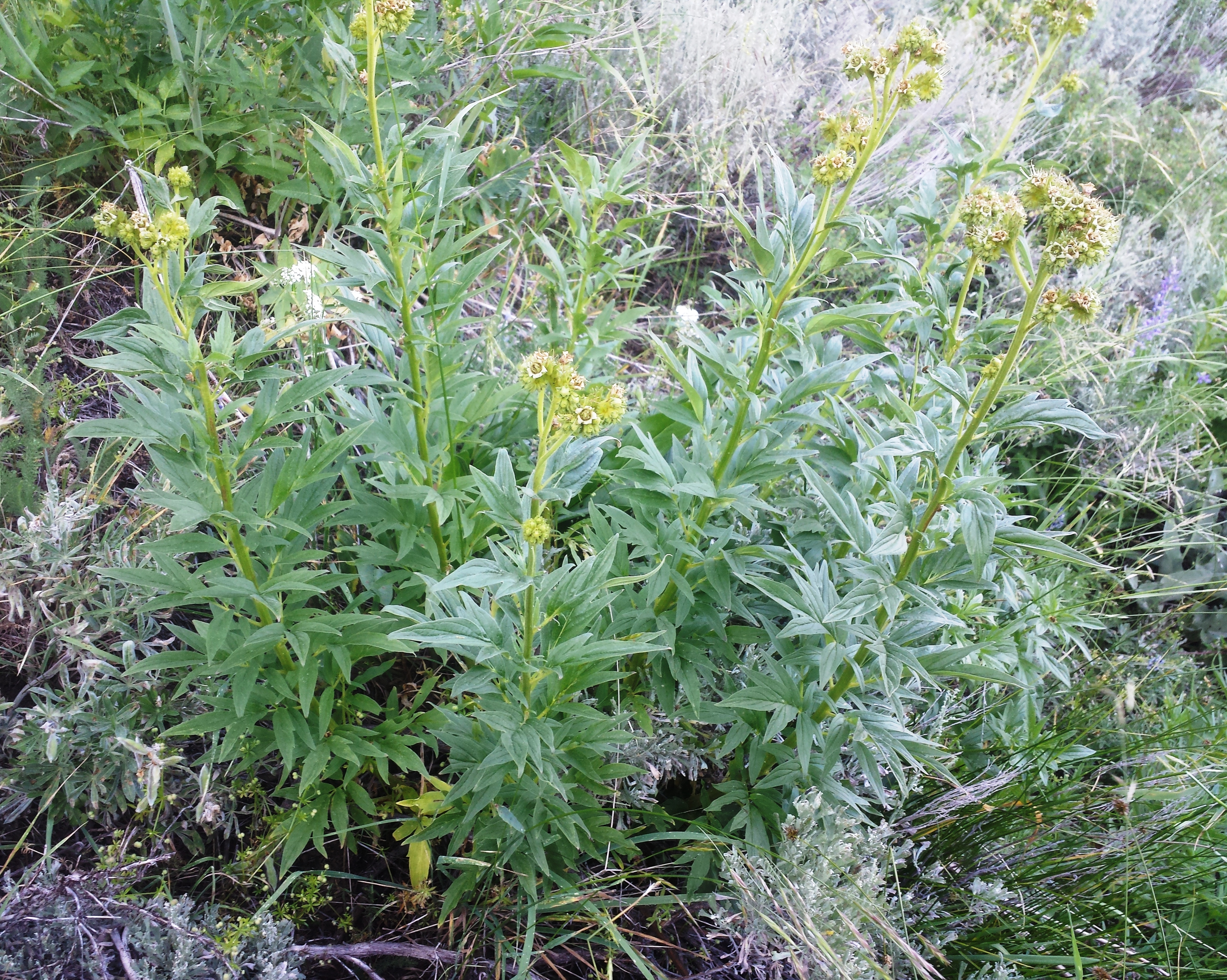

Scientific classification
- Kingdom: Plantae
- Clade: Tracheophytes
- Clade: Angiosperms
- Clade: Eudicots
- Clade: Asterids
- Order: Boraginales
- Family: Hydrophyllaceae
- Genus: Phacelia
- Species: P. procera

Binomial name
- Phacelia procera A.Gray

= Phacelia procera =

Species of plant

Phacelia procera is a species of phacelia known by the common name tall phacelia. It is native to the northwestern United States as far south as the Sierra Nevada, where it grows in mountainous habitat, such as forests, meadows, and talus.

It is a perennial herb producing an erect stem from a taproot, reaching a maximum height around two meters. It is hairy in texture, some of the hairs black and glandular. The lance-shaped or oval leaves are up to 12 centimeters long and toothed or lobed along the edges.

The inflorescence is a one-sided curving or coiling cyme of bell-shaped flowers. Each flower is under a centimeter long and white to greenish or brownish in color. It is surrounded by a calyx of pointed sepals coated in black glandular hairs.
