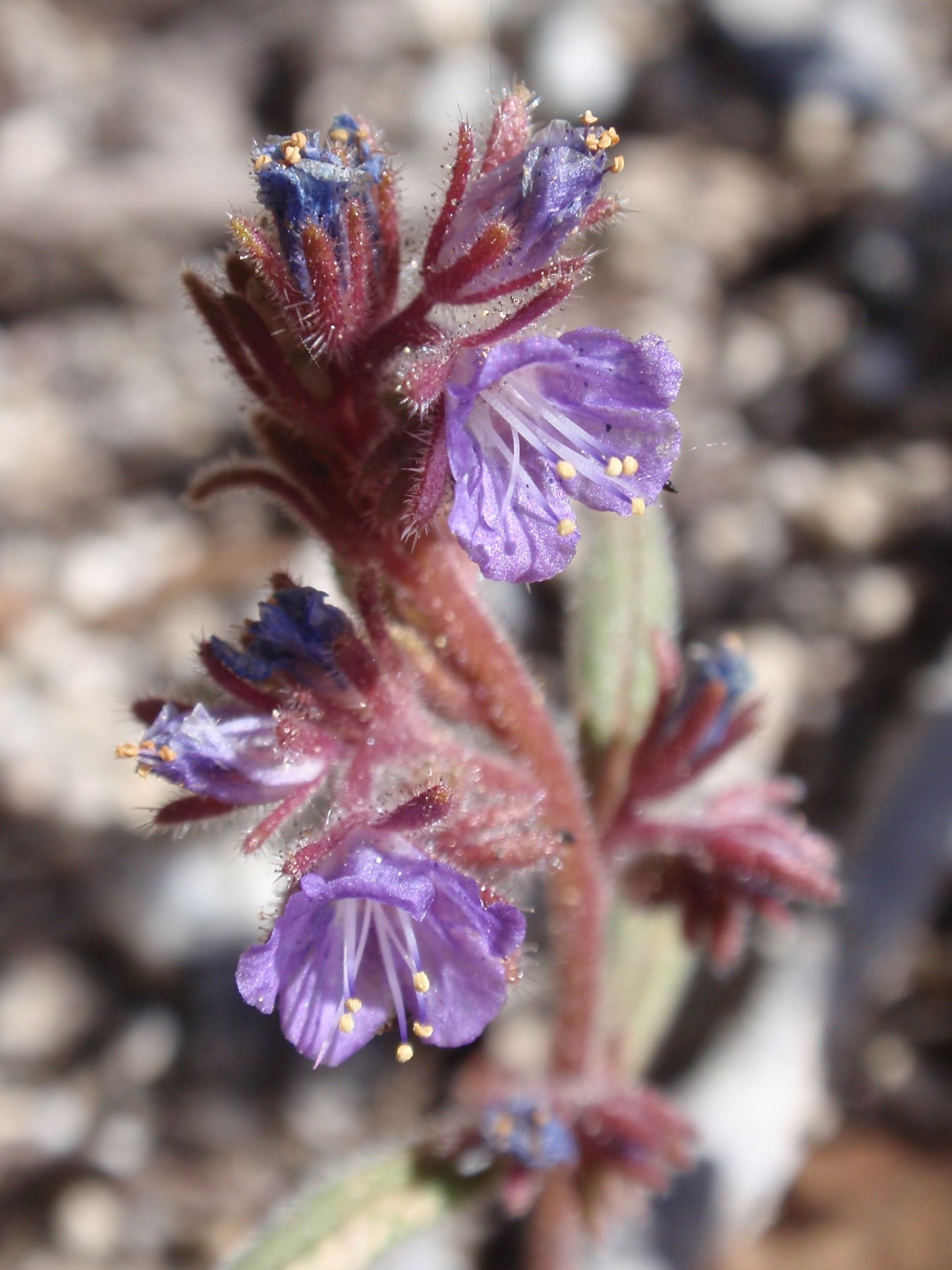

Scientific classification
- Kingdom: Plantae
- Clade: Tracheophytes
- Clade: Angiosperms
- Clade: Eudicots
- Clade: Asterids
- Order: Boraginales
- Family: Hydrophyllaceae
- Genus: Phacelia
- Species: P. quickii

Binomial name
- Phacelia quickii J.T.Howell

= Phacelia quickii =

Species of plant

Phacelia quickii is a species of phacelia known by the common name Quick's phacelia.

== Description ==
Phacelia quickii is an annual herb growing decumbent or erect with a stem reaching up to 18 centimeters long. It is hairy and sometimes glandular. The leaves are linear or lance-shaped and up to 5 centimeters long. The inflorescence is a one-sided curving or coiling cyme of bell-shaped flowers. Each flower is about half a centimeter long, lavender to blue or white in color, and surrounded by a calyx of long, narrow sepals.

Named after Clarence Roy Quick (1902-1987), plant ecologist who worked for the U.S. Department of Agriculture. He was a forest ecologist for the U.S. Forest Service and a plant pathologist and consultant for the Pacific Southwest Forest and Range Experimental Station. Some of his areas of research included seed germination, dormancy and longevity, ecology of forests and forest species, and chemical control of plants and tree diseases. He wrote articles on gooseberries, blister rust, fungicides and germination of Ceanothus seeds.

== Distribution ==
It is endemic to the Sierra Nevada of California, where it can be found on granite substrates in mountain habitat.
