= Phacelia thermalis =

Scientific classification
- Kingdom: Plantae
- Clade: Tracheophytes
- Clade: Angiosperms
- Clade: Eudicots
- Clade: Asterids
- Order: Boraginales
- Family: Hydrophyllaceae
- Genus: Phacelia
- Species: P. thermalis

Binomial name
- Phacelia thermalis Greene

Species of plant

Phacelia thermalis is a species of phacelia known by the common names heated phacelia and hot spring phacelia. It is native to the western United States from northeastern California to Idaho, with a disjunct population in Montana.

It grows in plateau and mountain habitat in open areas with clay soils. It is an annual herb with spreading or upright branches up to 45 centimeters long. It is glandular and coated in stiff hairs. The leaves are oval and toothed or divided into segments. The hairy inflorescence is a one-sided curving or coiling cyme of bell-shaped flowers. Each flower is under half a centimeter long and white to light blue in color.
