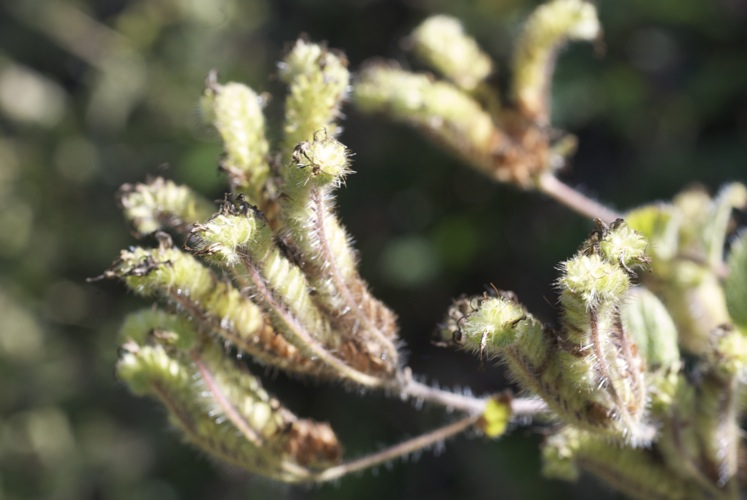

Scientific classification
- Kingdom: Plantae
- Clade: Tracheophytes
- Clade: Angiosperms
- Clade: Eudicots
- Clade: Asterids
- Order: Boraginales
- Family: Hydrophyllaceae
- Genus: Phacelia
- Species: P. nemoralis

Binomial name
- Phacelia nemoralis Greene

= Phacelia nemoralis =

Species of plant

Phacelia nemoralis is a species of flowering plant in the family Hydrophyllaceae known by the common name shade phacelia. It is native to the west coast of the United States from Washington to central California, where it grows in moist, usually forested areas along the coastline and in the coastal mountain ranges.

It is a perennial herb producing a densely hairy, erect stem which may reach two meters in height. The leaves are variable in shape, the largest lower ones 15 to 25 centimeters long and divided into several leaflets. Upper leaves are smaller and undivided. The inflorescence is a one-sided coiling cyme of bell-shaped flowers. Each flower is up to 6 millimeters long and greenish or yellowish white in color with whiskery protruding stamens.

There are two subspecies:

- Phacelia nemoralis ssp. oregonensis (Oregon phacelia) – distribution extends into Washington State
- Phacelia nemoralis ssp. nemoralis – occurs south of Washington
