= Phacelia longipes =

Scientific classification
- Kingdom: Plantae
- Clade: Tracheophytes
- Clade: Angiosperms
- Clade: Eudicots
- Clade: Asterids
- Order: Boraginales
- Family: Hydrophyllaceae
- Genus: Phacelia
- Species: P. longipes

Binomial name
- Phacelia longipes Torr. ex A.Gray

Species of plant

Phacelia longipes is a species of phacelia known by the common name longstalk phacelia.

== Distribution ==
The species is endemic to California, where it grows in the Transverse Ranges and adjacent western Mojave Desert. Its habitat includes chaparral, woodland, and forest, in rocky soils.

== Description ==
Phacelia longipes is an annual herb growing decumbent or erect to a maximum length of about 40 centimeters. It is glandular and coated lightly in soft and stiff hairs. Most of the leaves are low on the plant, the toothed oval blades borne on long petioles. The hairy, glandular inflorescence is a one-sided curving or coiling cyme of bell-shaped flowers. Each flower is roughly a centimeter long and white to light blue in color. It has a calyx of linear sepals and five long, protruding stamens.
