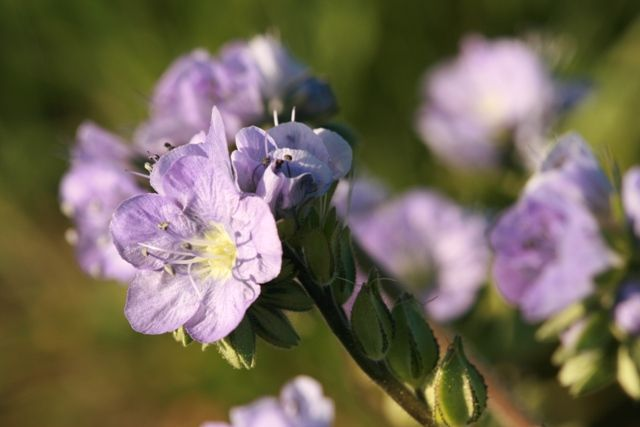

Scientific classification
- Kingdom: Plantae
- Clade: Tracheophytes
- Clade: Angiosperms
- Clade: Eudicots
- Clade: Asterids
- Order: Boraginales
- Family: Hydrophyllaceae
- Genus: Phacelia
- Species: P. ciliata

Binomial name
- Phacelia ciliata Benth.

= Phacelia ciliata =

Species of plant

Phacelia ciliata is a species of phacelia known by the common name Great Valley phacelia. It is native to California, where it can be found in many of the coastal mountain ranges, the Central Valley, and the Sierra Nevada foothills; its distribution extends into Baja California. It grows in grasslands and low mountain slopes.

== Description ==
Phacelia ciliata is an annual herb growing erect to a maximum height near half a meter. The branching or unbranched stem is glandular and lightly hairy. The oblong or oval leaves are up to 15 centimeters long, the larger ones divided into lobed or toothed leaflets.

The inflorescence is a one-sided curving or coiling cyme of many flowers. Each funnel- or bell-shaped flower has deeply veined, hair-lined sepals and a blue corolla with a pale throat.
