= Phacelia congdonii =

Scientific classification
- Kingdom: Plantae
- Clade: Tracheophytes
- Clade: Angiosperms
- Clade: Eudicots
- Clade: Asterids
- Order: Boraginales
- Family: Hydrophyllaceae
- Genus: Phacelia
- Species: P. congdonii

Binomial name
- Phacelia congdonii Greene

Species of plant

Phacelia congdonii is a species of phacelia known by the common name Congdon's phacelia. It is endemic to California, where it grows in the Sierra Nevada foothills and the Transverse Ranges. It is a member of the flora in chaparral, woodland, and other local habitat.

It is an annual herb growing mostly upright to a maximum height near 35 centimeters. The branching or unbranched stem is lightly coated in hairs. The oblong leaves are low on the plant and borne on petioles. The hairy inflorescence is a one-sided curving or coiling cyme of many funnel- or bell-shaped flowers. The flower has a lavender or pale purple corolla up to a centimeter wide surrounded by narrow linear hair-lined sepals.
