= Phacelia affinis =

Conservation status
- Secure (NatureServe)

Scientific classification
- Kingdom: Plantae
- Clade: Tracheophytes
- Clade: Angiosperms
- Clade: Eudicots
- Clade: Asterids
- Order: Boraginales
- Family: Hydrophyllaceae
- Genus: Phacelia
- Species: P. affinis

Binomial name
- Phacelia affinis A.Gray

Species of plant

Phacelia affinis is a species of flowering plant known by the common names limestone phacelia and purple-bell scorpionweed. It is native to the southwestern United States and Baja California and Sonora in Mexico. It can be found in scrub, woodland, forest, and other habitat.

It is an annual herb growing erect to a maximum height near 30 centimeters, its stem branching or not. The leaves are oblong in shape and are generally either deeply lobed or divided into several lobed leaflets. In texture the plant is slightly hairy and glandular. The inflorescence is a one-sided curving or coiling cyme of many bell-shaped flowers each just a few millimeters long. The flower is pale lavender or white with a yellowish tubular throat. The fruit is a capsule about half a centimeter long containing up to 30 seeds.
