= Phacelia saxicola =

Scientific classification
- Kingdom: Plantae
- Clade: Tracheophytes
- Clade: Angiosperms
- Clade: Eudicots
- Clade: Asterids
- Order: Boraginales
- Family: Hydrophyllaceae
- Genus: Phacelia
- Species: P. saxicola

Binomial name
- Phacelia saxicola A.Gray

Species of plant

Phacelia saxicola is a species of phacelia known by the common name stonecrop phacelia. It is native to the deserts, hills, and mountain slopes of far eastern California and adjacent sections of western Nevada and Arizona.

It grows in woodland habitat and cracks in rocky limestone slopes above the deserts. It is an annual herb growing upright or erect no more than 15 centimeters tall, often remaining smaller and compact. It is glandular and its many small branches are coated in short, stiff hairs. The leaves are no more than a centimeter long with fleshy lance-shaped to bulbous oval blades on short petioles. The hairy inflorescence is a one-sided curving or coiling cyme of small bell-shaped flowers, each only 3 or 4 millimeters long. The flowers are light blue or purple with whitish throats.
