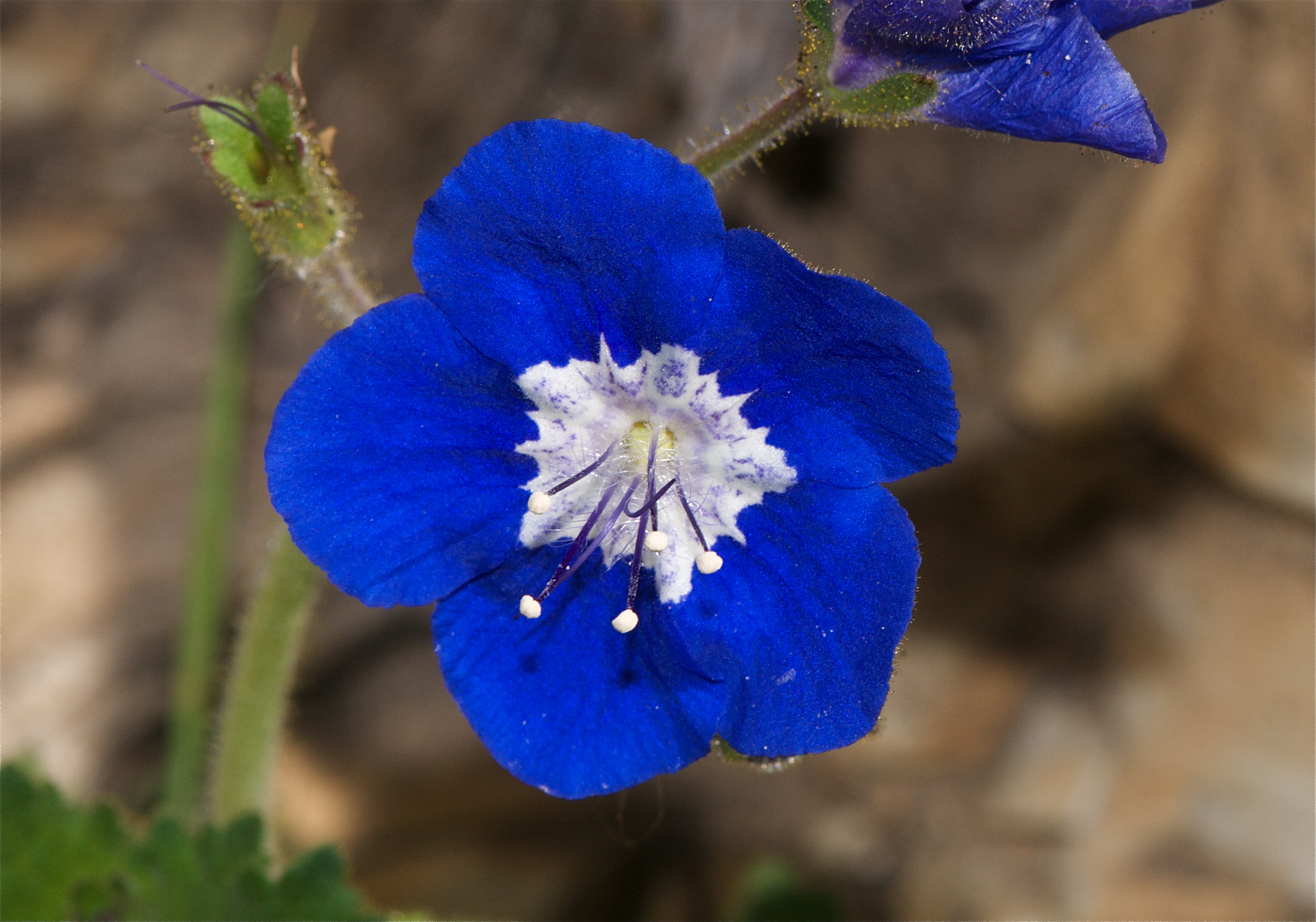

Scientific classification
- Kingdom: Plantae
- Clade: Tracheophytes
- Clade: Angiosperms
- Clade: Eudicots
- Clade: Asterids
- Order: Boraginales
- Family: Boraginaceae
- Genus: Phacelia
- Species: P. viscida

Binomial name
- Phacelia viscida (Benth. ex Lindl.) Torr.

= Phacelia viscida =

Species of plant

Phacelia viscida is a species of phacelia known by the common names sticky phacelia and tacky phacelia.

It is native to the coastal hills and mountains of central and southern California, where it grows in local habitat types such as coastal sage scrub, chaparral, and sandy recently burned areas.

== Description ==
Phacelia viscida is an annual herb growing erect to a maximum height near 70 centimeters. It is glandular and sticky and coated in soft and stiff hairs. The leaves have toothed oval blades borne on petioles.

The hairy, glandular inflorescence is a curving cyme of five-lobed flowers. Each flower is up to 2 centimeters wide and nearly white to deep blue in color with a paler, mottled center. The five protruding stamens are tipped with white anthers.

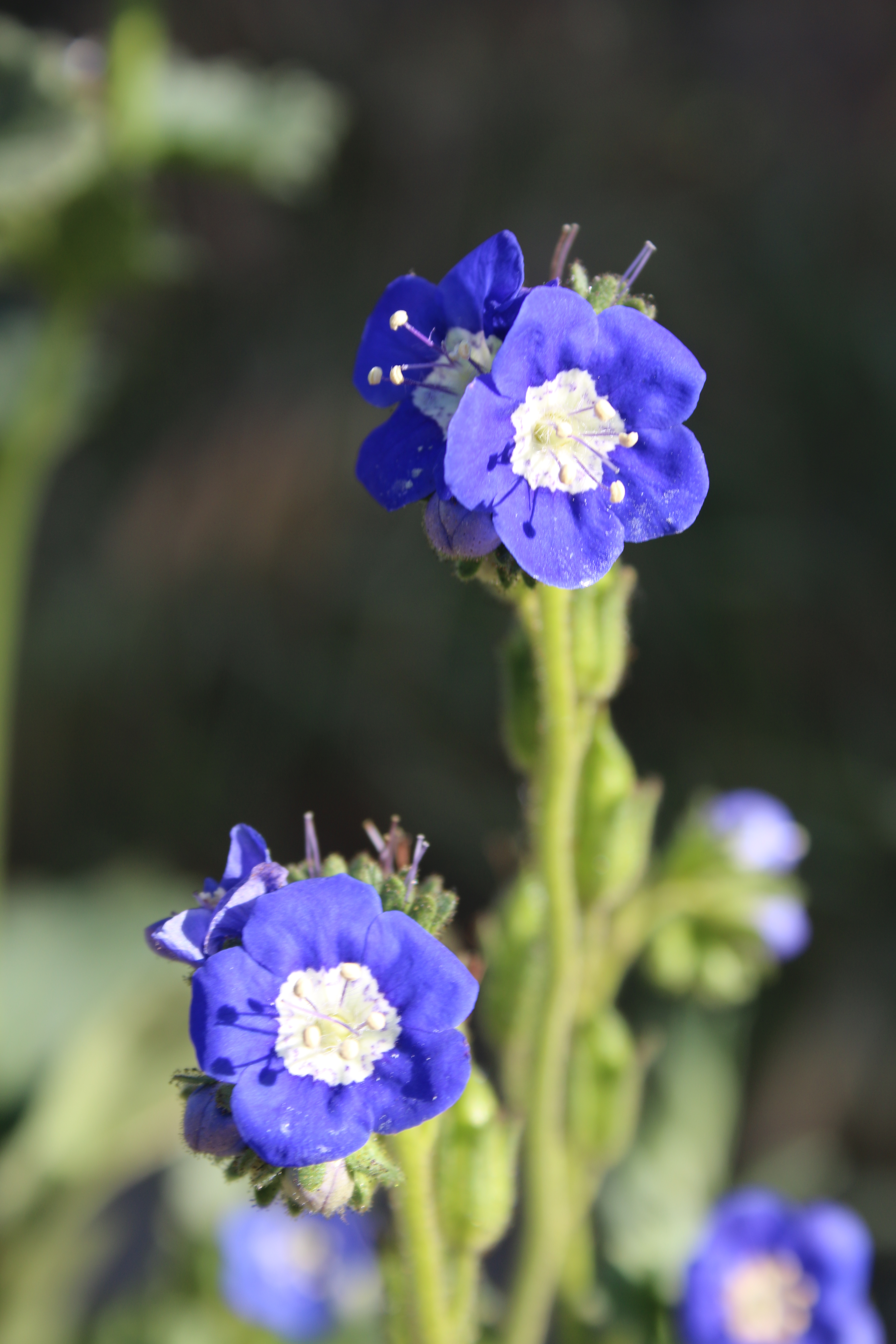
Phacelia viscida var. viscida
