= Phacelia purpusii =

Purpus' phacelia

Scientific classification
- Kingdom: Plantae
- Clade: Tracheophytes
- Clade: Angiosperms
- Clade: Eudicots
- Clade: Asterids
- Order: Boraginales
- Family: Hydrophyllaceae
- Genus: Phacelia
- Species: P. purpusii

Binomial name
- Phacelia purpusii Brandegee

Species of plant

Phacelia purpusii is a species of phacelia known by the common name Purpus' phacelia, that is endemic to California where it can be found in forests and other habitats within Sierra Nevada or further north in the southernmost portion of the Cascades and adjacent Modoc Plateau.

It is a glandular and hairy-textured annual herb exhibiting a mostly erect habit to a maximum height of about 40 centimeters. Its oval leaves are up to 5 centimeters long and smooth or lobed along the edges, and its hairy inflorescences are one-sided, curving or coiling cymes of tiny, bell-shaped flowers. Each flower is under a centimeter long and a shade of light purple.
