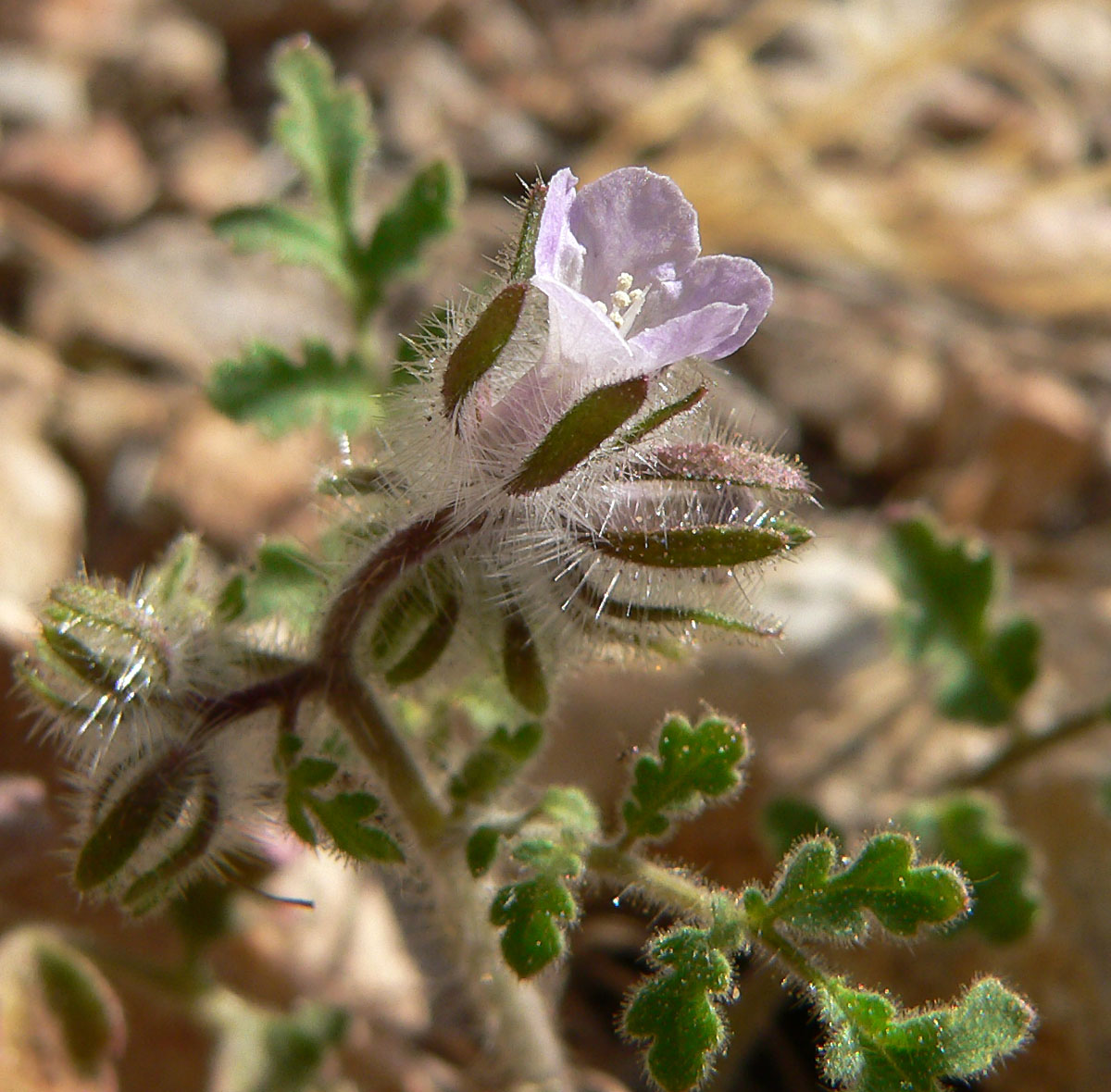

Conservation status
- Secure (NatureServe)

Scientific classification
- Kingdom: Plantae
- Clade: Tracheophytes
- Clade: Angiosperms
- Clade: Eudicots
- Clade: Asterids
- Order: Boraginales
- Family: Hydrophyllaceae
- Genus: Phacelia
- Species: P. cryptantha

Binomial name
- Phacelia cryptantha Greene

= Phacelia cryptantha =

Species of plant

Phacelia cryptantha is a species of flowering plant in the family Hydrophyllaceae, known by the common name hiddenflower phacelia. It is native to the southwestern United States and Baja California in Mexico, where it grows in several habitat types in desert, rocky mountain slopes, canyons, plateau, and other areas.

It is an annual herb growing mostly erect to a maximum height near half a meter, usually unbranched. It is glandular and coated in short and soft or long, stiff hairs. The lower leaves are up to 15 centimeters long and divided into leaflets; leaves higher on the plant are smaller but may be compound as well. The inflorescence is a one-sided curving or coiling cyme of several narrow bell-shaped flowers. The flower is pale blue to lavender, under a centimeter long, and surrounded by long, narrow linear sepals covered in hairs.
