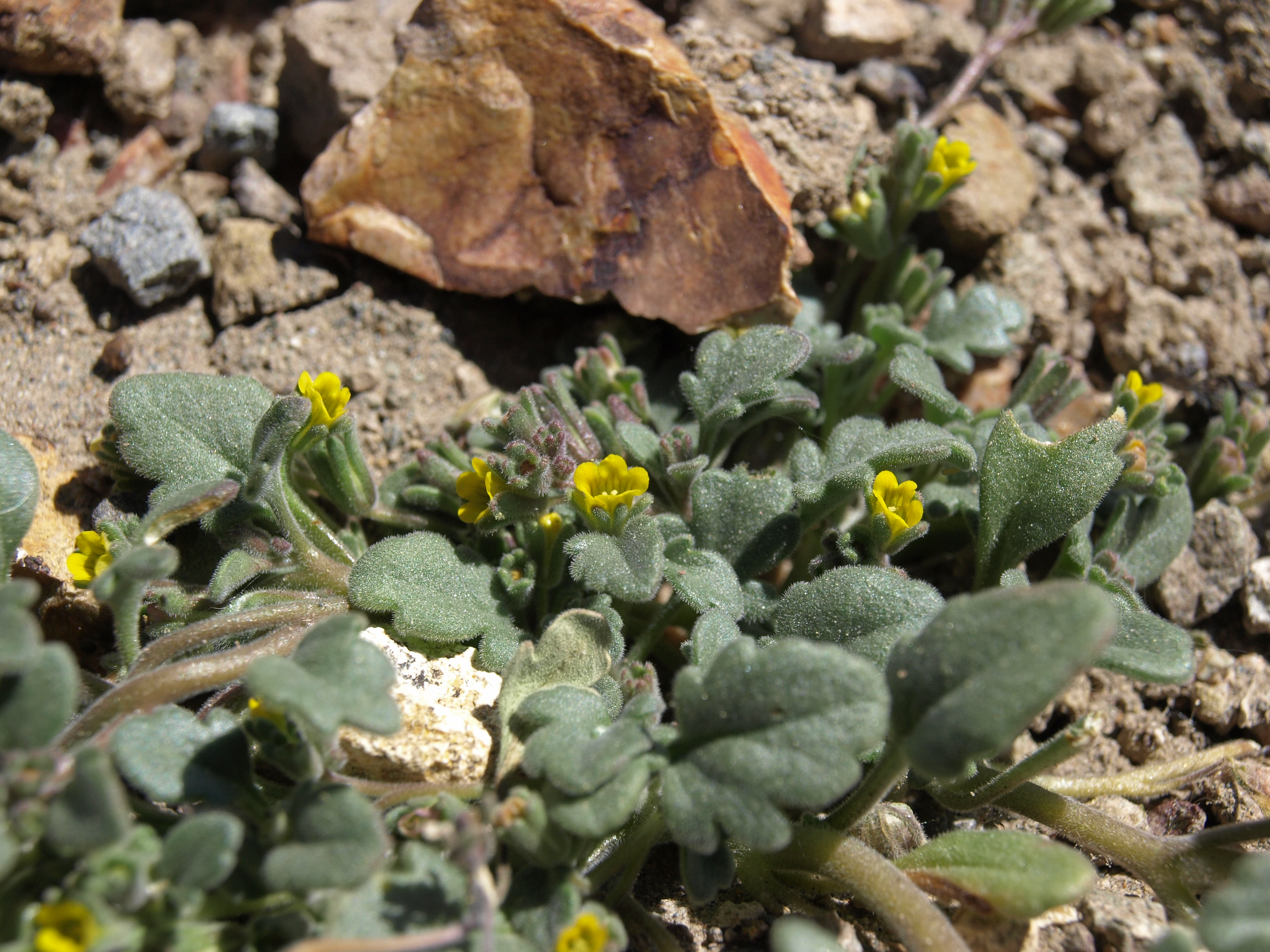

Conservation status
- Vulnerable (NatureServe)

Scientific classification
- Kingdom: Plantae
- Clade: Tracheophytes
- Clade: Angiosperms
- Clade: Eudicots
- Clade: Asterids
- Order: Boraginales
- Family: Hydrophyllaceae
- Genus: Phacelia
- Species: P. monoensis

Binomial name
- Phacelia monoensis R.Halse

= Phacelia monoensis =

Species of plant

Phacelia monoensis is an uncommon species of phacelia known by the common name Mono County phacelia.

== Distribution ==
It is native to the Great Basin plateaus east of the Sierra Nevada in Mono County, California, and central western Nevada. It grows in sagebrush, on wooded slopes, and on open expanses of alkaline clay soils.

It is apparently most abundant in disturbed areas, such as along road cuts and in areas of mining activity.

== Description ==
Phacelia monoensis is a small, patchy annual herb producing spreading, stout stems up to about 12 centimeters (4 3/4 in) long. It is glandular and coated lightly in hairs. The leaves are 1 or 2 centimeters (2/5 or 4/5 in) long and sometimes have lobed edges.

The hairy, glandular inflorescence is a one-sided cyme of several narrow bell-shaped yellow flowers each no more than one-half centimeter (1/4 in) long.
