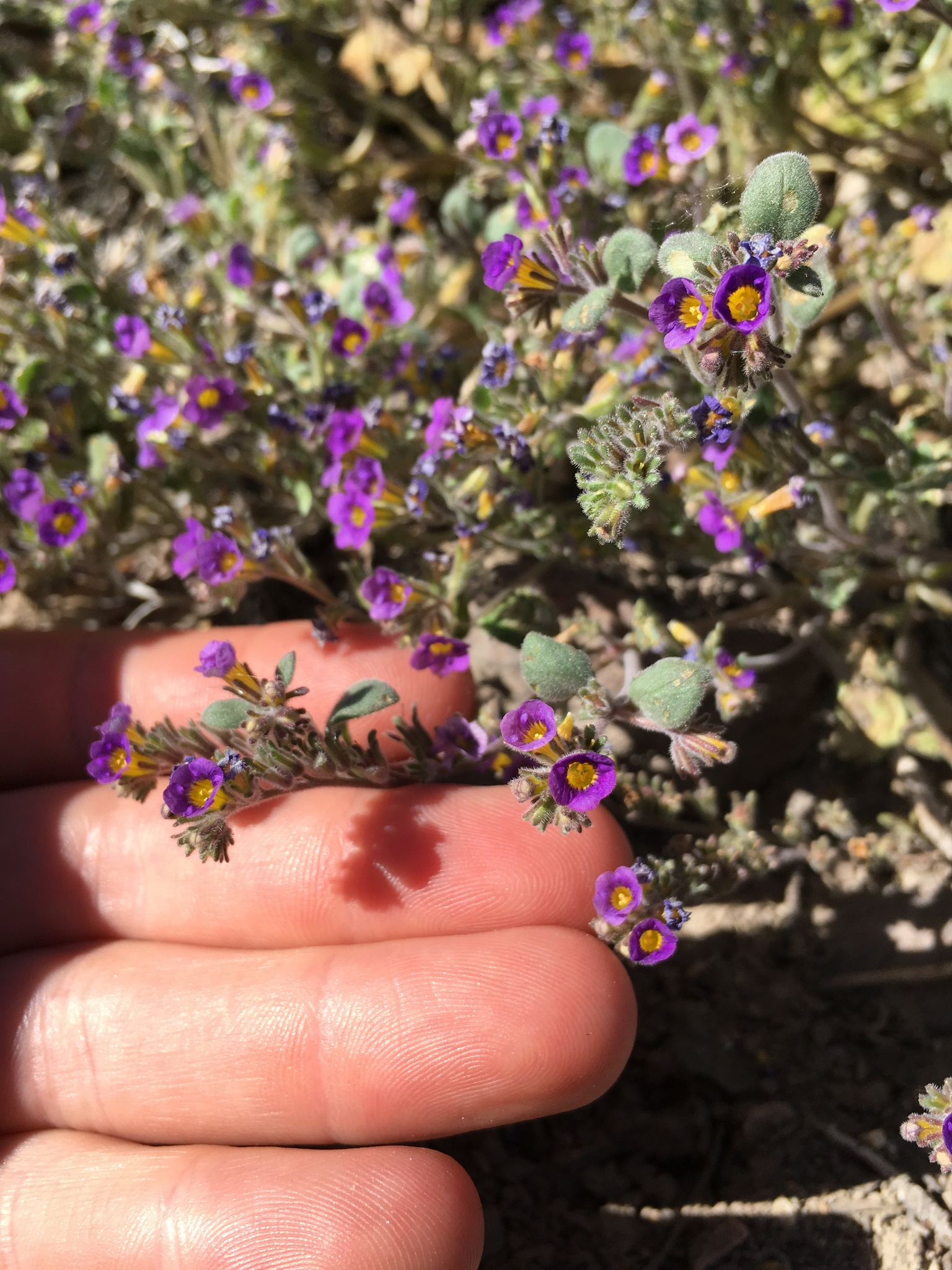

Scientific classification
- Kingdom: Plantae
- Clade: Tracheophytes
- Clade: Angiosperms
- Clade: Eudicots
- Clade: Asterids
- Order: Boraginales
- Family: Hydrophyllaceae
- Genus: Phacelia
- Species: P. gymnoclada

Binomial name
- Phacelia gymnoclada Torr. ex S.Watson

Synonyms
- Phacelia crassifolia

= Phacelia gymnoclada =

Species of plant

Phacelia gymnoclada is a species of phacelia known by the common name nakedstem phacelia. It is native to the western Great Basin of the United States, where it can be found in the scrublands of Nevada, Oregon, and the eastern edge of California.

== Description ==
Phacelia gymnoclada is an annual herb with a branching, spreading or upright stem up to about 20 centimeters long. It is glandular and coated in short hairs. The lance-shaped or oval leaves are mostly located low on the plant. They are a few centimeters long and have lobed or wavy edges. The hairy inflorescence is a one-sided curving or coiling cyme of funnel- or bell-shaped flowers. Each flower is up to a centimeter long and has a yellow tubular throat and five corolla lobes which are usually lavender in color. It is surrounded by narrow, elongated sepals.
