= Phacelia platyloba =

Scientific classification
- Kingdom: Plantae
- Clade: Tracheophytes
- Clade: Angiosperms
- Clade: Eudicots
- Clade: Asterids
- Order: Boraginales
- Family: Hydrophyllaceae
- Genus: Phacelia
- Species: P. platyloba

Binomial name
- Phacelia platyloba A.Gray

Species of plant

Phacelia platyloba is a species of phacelia known by the common name broadlobe phacelia. It is endemic to California, where it is known only from a section of the central Sierra Nevada foothills. It is a resident of chaparral, woodland, and other local habitat.

It is an annual herb producing a branched or unbranched erect stem up to 45 centimeters tall. It is coated in soft and stiff hairs. The leaves are up to 9 centimeters long and divided into several lobed to intricately toothed leaflets. The inflorescence is a one-sided curving or coiling cyme of widely bell-shaped flowers. Each flower is about half a centimeter long and pale blue or lavender in color. It is surrounded by a calyx of densely hairy sepals which are unequal in size and shape, 2 being longer and wider than the other 3.
