= Phacelia coerulea =

Scientific classification
- Kingdom: Plantae
- Clade: Tracheophytes
- Clade: Angiosperms
- Clade: Eudicots
- Clade: Asterids
- Order: Boraginales
- Family: Hydrophyllaceae
- Genus: Phacelia
- Species: P. coerulea

Binomial name
- Phacelia coerulea Greene

Species of plant

Phacelia coerulea is a species of phacelia known by the common name skyblue phacelia. It is native to the California and the Southwestern United States and northern Mexico, where it grows in desert and plateau habitat types, such as scrub and woodland.

It is an annual herb growing mostly upright to a maximum height near 40 centimeters. The branching or unbranched stem is coated in soft and coarse hairs. The oblong leaves are a few centimeters long and generally have rounded lobes along the edges. The hairy inflorescence is a one-sided curving or coiling cyme of many flowers. The bell-shaped flowers are light blue or purple and no more than half a centimeter wide.
