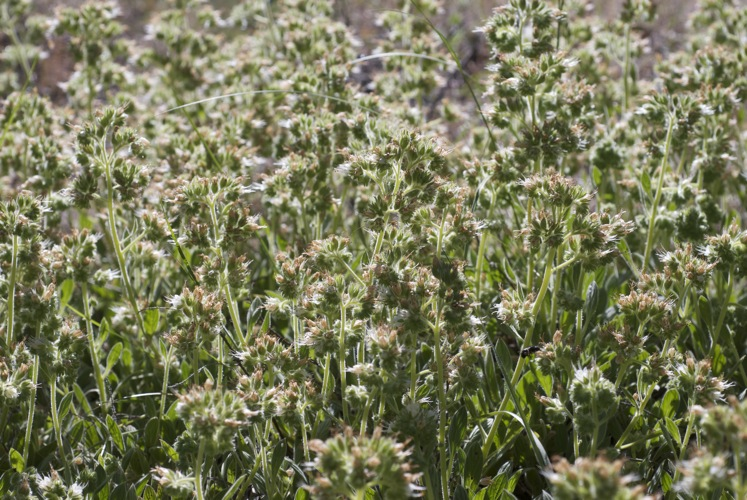

Scientific classification
- Kingdom: Plantae
- Clade: Tracheophytes
- Clade: Angiosperms
- Clade: Eudicots
- Clade: Asterids
- Order: Boraginales
- Family: Hydrophyllaceae
- Genus: Phacelia
- Species: P. corymbosa

Binomial name
- Phacelia corymbosa Jeps.

= Phacelia corymbosa =

Species of plant

Phacelia corymbosa is a species of flowering plant known by the common name serpentine phacelia. It is native to the mountains of southern Oregon and northern California, where it grows in serpentine soils.

It is a perennial herb growing mostly erect to a maximum height near 40 centimeters. It is very glandular and coated in stiff hairs. The lower leaves are up to 15 centimeters long and sometimes divided into smaller leaflets; leaves higher on the plant are smaller and generally undivided. The hairy inflorescence is a coiling cluster of cylindrical white flowers, each about half a centimeter long and with five long protruding stamens.
