= Phacelia orogenes =

Scientific classification
- Kingdom: Plantae
- Clade: Tracheophytes
- Clade: Angiosperms
- Clade: Eudicots
- Clade: Asterids
- Order: Boraginales
- Family: Hydrophyllaceae
- Genus: Phacelia
- Species: P. orogenes

Binomial name
- Phacelia orogenes Brand

Species of plant

Phacelia orogenes is an uncommon species of phacelia known by the common name mountain phacelia. It is endemic to California, where it is known only from the southern High Sierra, particularly around Mineral King in Sequoia National Forest.

It grows in coniferous forest and meadows.

== Description ==
Phacelia orogenes is a small annual growing up to 10 centimeters tall with a hairy, glandular stem. The linear or lance-shaped leaves are up to 3 centimeters long.

The inflorescence is a cyme of bell-shaped flowers each about half a centimeter long. They are purple with whitish tubular throats.
