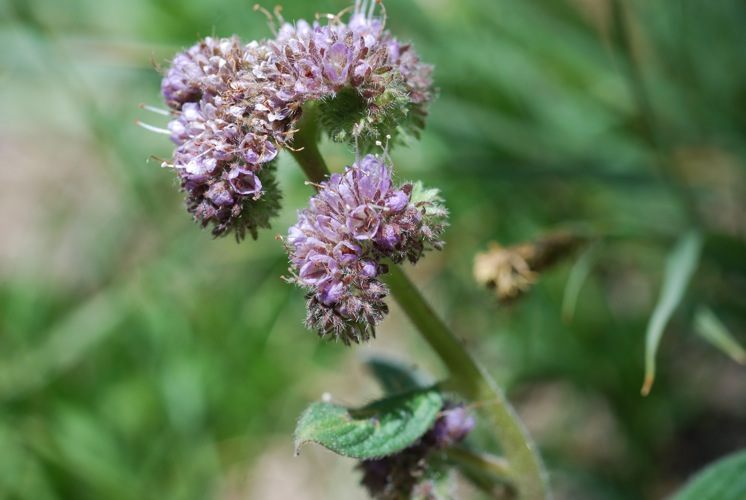

Scientific classification
- Kingdom: Plantae
- Clade: Tracheophytes
- Clade: Angiosperms
- Clade: Eudicots
- Clade: Asterids
- Order: Boraginales
- Family: Hydrophyllaceae
- Genus: Phacelia
- Species: P. mutabilis

Binomial name
- Phacelia mutabilis Greene

= Phacelia mutabilis =

Species of plant

Phacelia mutabilis is a species of flowering plant in the borage family known by the common name changeable phacelia. It is native to the western United States and Baja California, where it can be found in mountains and foothills, in forested and open habitat types, and deserts.

It is a perennial herb growing mat-like, decumbent, or upright with hairy stems reaching 60 centimeters in maximum length. The leaves have lance-shaped or oval blades which are sometimes divided into 3 segments. The inflorescence is a one-sided curving or coiling cyme of tubular to bell-shaped flowers. Each flower is about half a centimeter long and white, yellowish or purplish in color with long protruding stamens. It is surrounded by a calyx of elongated, hairy sepals.
