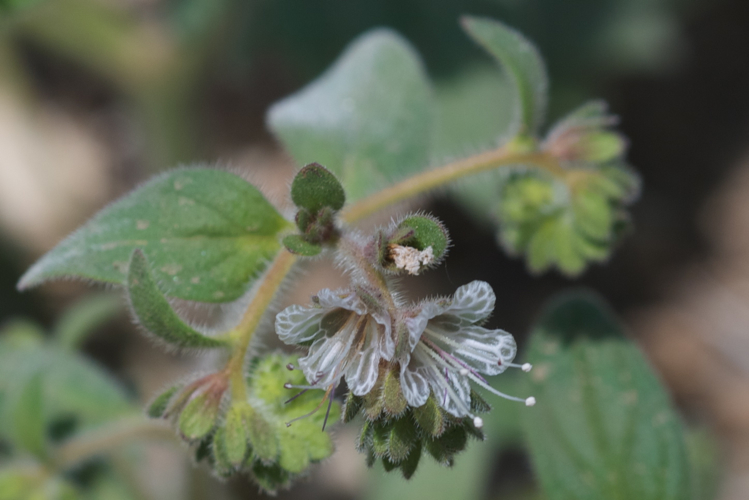

Conservation status
- Vulnerable (NatureServe)

Scientific classification
- Kingdom: Plantae
- Clade: Tracheophytes
- Clade: Angiosperms
- Clade: Eudicots
- Clade: Asterids
- Order: Boraginales
- Family: Hydrophyllaceae
- Genus: Phacelia
- Species: P. grisea

Binomial name
- Phacelia grisea A.Gray

= Phacelia grisea =

Species of plant

Phacelia grisea is a species of phacelia known by the common name Santa Lucia phacelia. It is endemic to California, where it can be found in the Santa Lucia Range and western sections of the Transverse Ranges.

== Description ==
Phacelia grisea is an annual herb with a branching, erect stem reaching up to about 60 centimeters in height. It is glandular and coated in stiff hairs. The lance-shaped or oval leaves are up to 8 centimeters long and have lobed edges. The hairy inflorescence is a one-sided curving or coiling cyme of bell-shaped flowers. Each flower is about half a centimeter long and white to pale purple in color with long protruding stamens.

== Distribution and habitat ==
It grows in chaparral and other habitat on the mountain slopes in San Luis Obispo, Monterey, Santa Barbara, and Ventura Counties.
