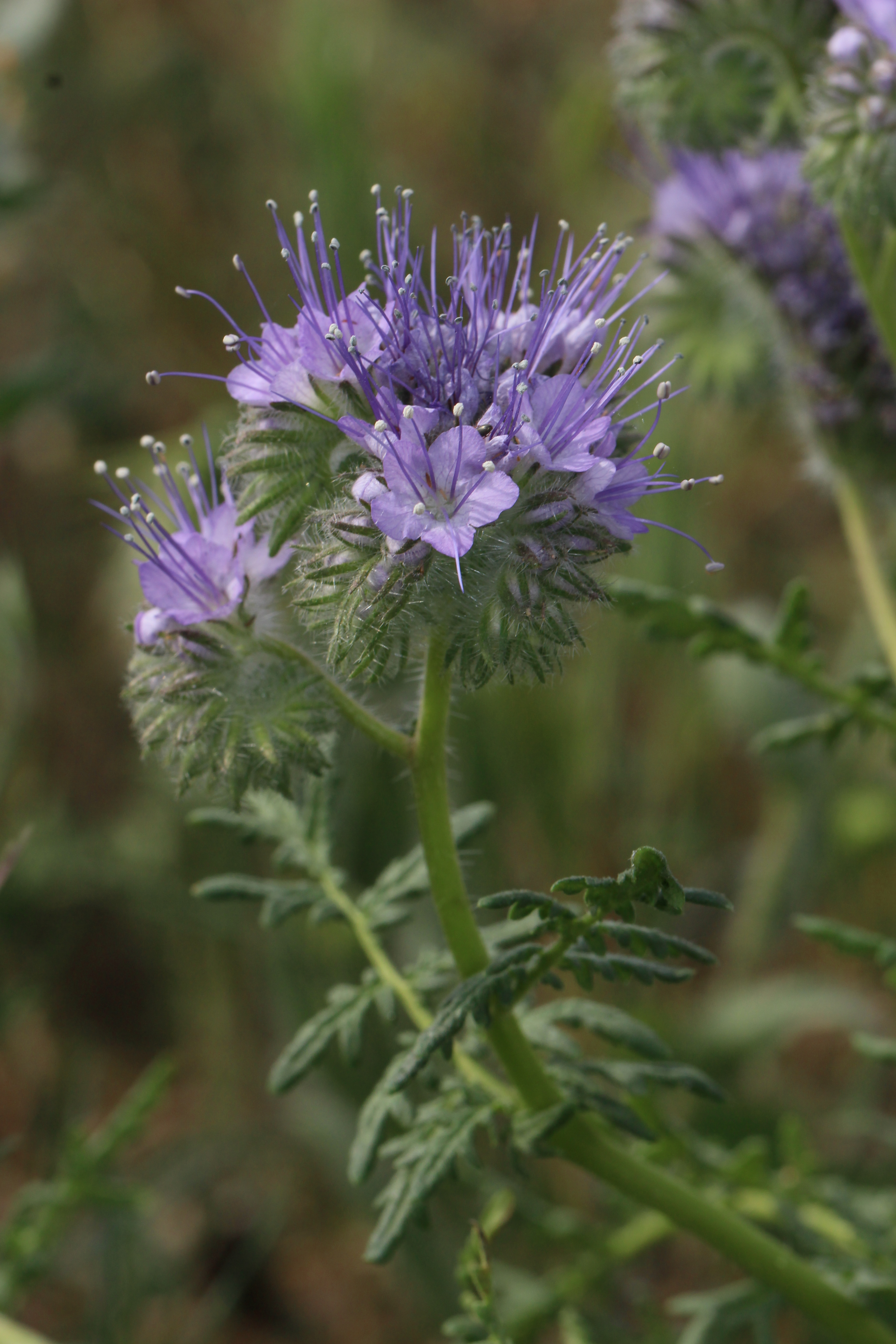
- Phacelia tanacetifolia

Scientific classification
- Kingdom: Plantae
- Clade: Embryophytes
- Clade: Tracheophytes
- Clade: Angiosperms
- Clade: Eudicots
- Clade: Asterids
- Order: Boraginales
- Family: Hydrophyllaceae
- Genus: Phacelia; Juss. (1789)

Type species
- Phacelia secunda J.F.Gmel.

Diversity
- About 200 species

Synonyms
- Aldea Ruiz & Pav. (1794); Cosmanthus Nolte ex A.DC. (1845); Endiplus Raf. (1818); Eutoca R.Br. (1823); Heteryta Raf. (1808); Howellanthus (Constance) Walden & R.Patt. (2010); Microgenetes A.DC. (1845); Miltitzia A.DC. (1845); Whitlavia Harv. (1846)

= Phacelia =

Genus of flowering plants in the borage family

Phacelia (phacelia, scorpionweed, heliotrope) is a genus of about 200 species of annual or perennial herbaceous plants in the family Hydrophyllaceae, native to North and South America. California is particularly rich in species with over 90 recorded in the region.

The genus includes both annual and perennial species. Many have been cultivated as garden and honey plants.

The mining bee Andrena phaceliae is a specialist pollinator of this genus in the Eastern United States.

== Taxonomy ==
The genus is traditionally placed at family rank with the waterleafs (Hydrophyllaceae) in the order Boraginales. The Angiosperm Phylogeny Group, recognizing that the traditional Boraginaceae and Hydrophyllaceae are paraphyletic with respect to each other, merges the latter into the former and considers the family basal in the Euasterids I clade. Other botanists continue to recognize the Hydrophyllaceae and Boraginales after analysing the secondary structure of the ITS1 genetic region rather than its sequence for these higher taxonomic levels. This placed Phacelia within the Hydrophyllaceae. Further molecular taxonomic analysis of the Boraginales has divided the Boraginales in two and placed Phacelia among the monophyletic herbaceous Hydrophyllaceae in Boraginales II. As of December 2025, this placement was accepted by World Flora Online, among other taxonomic databases.

=== Selected species ===
- Phacelia adenophora J.T.Howell – glandular yellow Phacelia
- Phacelia affinis A.Gray – limestone Phacelia
- Phacelia anelsonii J.F.Macbr. – Aven Nelson's Phacelia
- Phacelia argentea A.Nelson & J.F.Macbr. – sand dune Phacelia
- Phacelia argillacea N.D.Atwood – Attwood's Phacelia, clay Phacelia (endangered)
- Phacelia austromontana J.T.Howell – Southern Sierra Phacelia
- Phacelia bicolor Torr. ex S.Watson – trumpet Phacelia
- Phacelia bolanderi A.Gray – Bolander's Phacelia
- Phacelia brachyloba (Benth.) A.Gray – shortlobe Phacelia
- Phacelia breweri A.Gray – Brewer's Phacelia
- Phacelia californica Cham. – California Phacelia
- Phacelia calthifolia Brand – Caltha-leaved Phacelia
- Phacelia campanularia A.Gray – California bluebell, desertbells
- Phacelia cicutaria Greene – caterpillar Phacelia
- Phacelia ciliata Benth. – Great Valley Phacelia
- Phacelia coerulea Greene – skyblue Phacelia
- Phacelia congdonii Greene – Congdon's Phacelia
- Phacelia cookei Constance & Heckard – Cooke's Phacelia
- Phacelia corymbosa Jeps. – serpentine Phacelia
- Phacelia covillei S.Watson – Coville's Phacelia, buttercup scorpionweed
- Phacelia crenulata Torr. ex S.Watson – notch-leaved Phacelia, Cleftleaf wild heliotrope
- Phacelia cryptantha Greene – hiddenflower Phacelia
- Phacelia curvipes Torr. ex S.Watson – Washoe Phacelia
- Phacelia dalesiana J.T.Howell – Scott Mountain Phacelia
- Phacelia davidsonii A.Gray – Davidson's Phacelia
- Phacelia distans Benth. – distant Phacelia
- Phacelia divaricata (Benth.) A.Gray – divaricate Phacelia
- Phacelia douglasii (Benth.) Torr. – Douglas' Phacelia
- Phacelia egena (Brand) Greene ex C.F.Baker – Kaweah River Phacelia
- Phacelia eisenii Brandegee – Eisen's Phacelia
- Phacelia exilis (A.Gray) G.J.Lee – Transverse Range Phacelia, lavender windows
- Phacelia fimbriata Michx. – fringed Phacelia
- Phacelia floribunda Greene – San Clemente Island Phacelia, Southern Island Phacelia
- Phacelia formosula Osterh. – North Park Phacelia (endangered)
- Phacelia fremontii Torr. – Frémont's Phacelia
- Phacelia grandiflora (Benth.) A.Gray – largeflower Phacelia
- Phacelia greenei J.T.Howell – Scott Valley Phacelia
- Phacelia grisea A.Gray – Santa Lucia Phacelia
- Phacelia gymnoclada Torr. ex S.Watson – nakedstem Phacelia
- Phacelia hastata Douglas ex Lehm. – silverleaf Phacelia
- Phacelia humilis Torr. & A.Gray – low Phacelia
- Phacelia hydrophylloides Torr. & A.Gray – waterleaf Phacelia
- Phacelia imbricata Greene – imbricate Phacelia
- Phacelia insularis Munz – coast Phacelia
- Phacelia inundata J.T.Howell – playa Phacelia
- Phacelia inyoensis (J.F.Macbr.) J.T.Howell – Inyo Phacelia
- Phacelia ivesiana Torr. – Ives' Phacelia
- Phacelia lemmonii A.Gray – Lemmon's Phacelia
- Phacelia leonis J.T.Howell – Siskiyou Phacelia
- Phacelia linearis (Pursh) Holz. – threadleaf Phacelia
- Phacelia longipes Torr. ex A.Gray – longstalk Phacelia
- Phacelia malvifolia Cham. & Schltdl. – stinging Phacelia
- Phacelia marcescens Eastw. ex J.F.Macbr. – persistentflower Phacelia
- Phacelia minor (Harv.) Thell. – Whitlavia, wild Canterbury bells
- Phacelia mohavensis A.Gray – Mojave Phacelia
- Phacelia monoensis Halse – Mono Phacelia
- Phacelia mustelina Coville – weasel Phacelia, Death Valley round-leaved Phacelia
- Phacelia mutabilis Greene – changeable Phacelia
- Phacelia nashiana Jeps. – Charlotte's Phacelia
- Phacelia neglecta M.E.Jones – alkali Phacelia
- Phacelia nemoralis Greene – shade Phacelia
- Phacelia orogenes Brand – mountain Phacelia
- Phacelia pachyphylla A.Gray – blacktack Phacelia
- Phacelia parishii A.Gray – Parish's Phacelia
- Phacelia parryi Torr. – Parry's Phacelia
- Phacelia pedicellata A.Gray – pedicellate Phacelia
- Phacelia perityloides Coville – Panamint Phacelia
- Phacelia phacelioides (Benth.) Brand – Mt. Diablo Phacelia
- Phacelia platyloba A.Gray – broadlobe Phacelia
- Phacelia pringlei A.Gray – Pringle's Phacelia
- Phacelia procera A.Gray – tall Phacelia
- Phacelia purpusii Brandegee – Purpus' Phacelia
- Phacelia purshii Buckley – Miami mist
- Phacelia quickii J.T.Howell – Quick's Phacelia
- Phacelia racemosa (Kellogg) A.Heller – racemose Phacelia
- Phacelia ramosissima Douglas ex Lehm. – branching Phacelia
- Phacelia rattanii A.Gray – Rattan's Phacelia
- Phacelia rotundifolia Torr. ex S.Watson – roundleaf Phacelia
- Phacelia saxicola A.Gray – stonecrop Phacelia
- Phacelia sericea (Graham) A.Gray – silky Phacelia
- Phacelia stebbinsii Constance & Heckard – Stebbins' Phacelia
- Phacelia stellaris Brand – star Phacelia, Brand's Phacelia
- Phacelia tanacetifolia Benth. – lacy Phacelia
- Phacelia thermalis Greene – heated Phacelia
- Phacelia vallicola Congdon ex Brand – Mariposa Phacelia
- Phacelia vallis-mortae J.W.Voss – Death Valley Phacelia
- Phacelia viscida (Benth. ex Lindl.) Torr. – tacky Phacelia
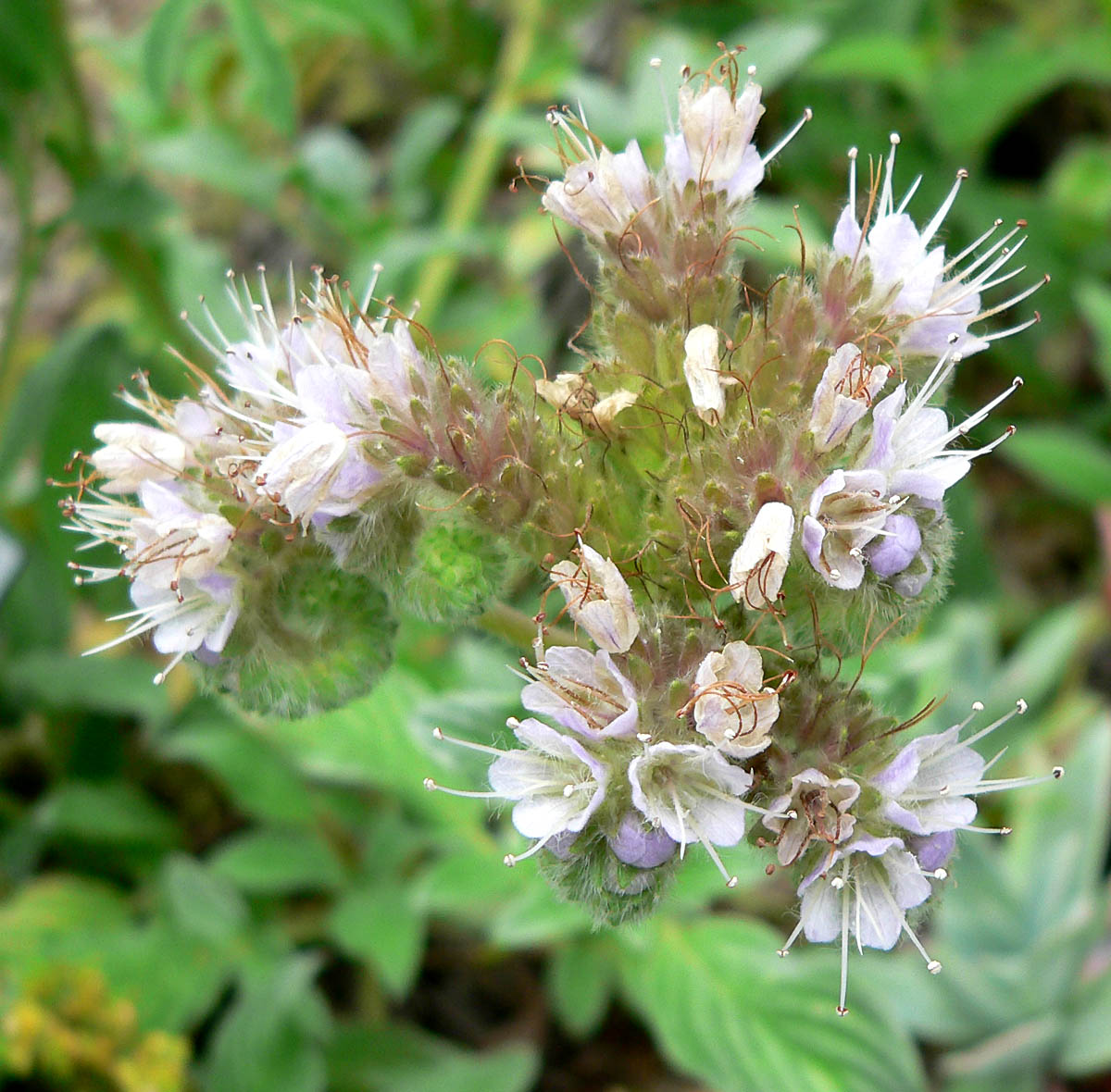
Phacelia argentea

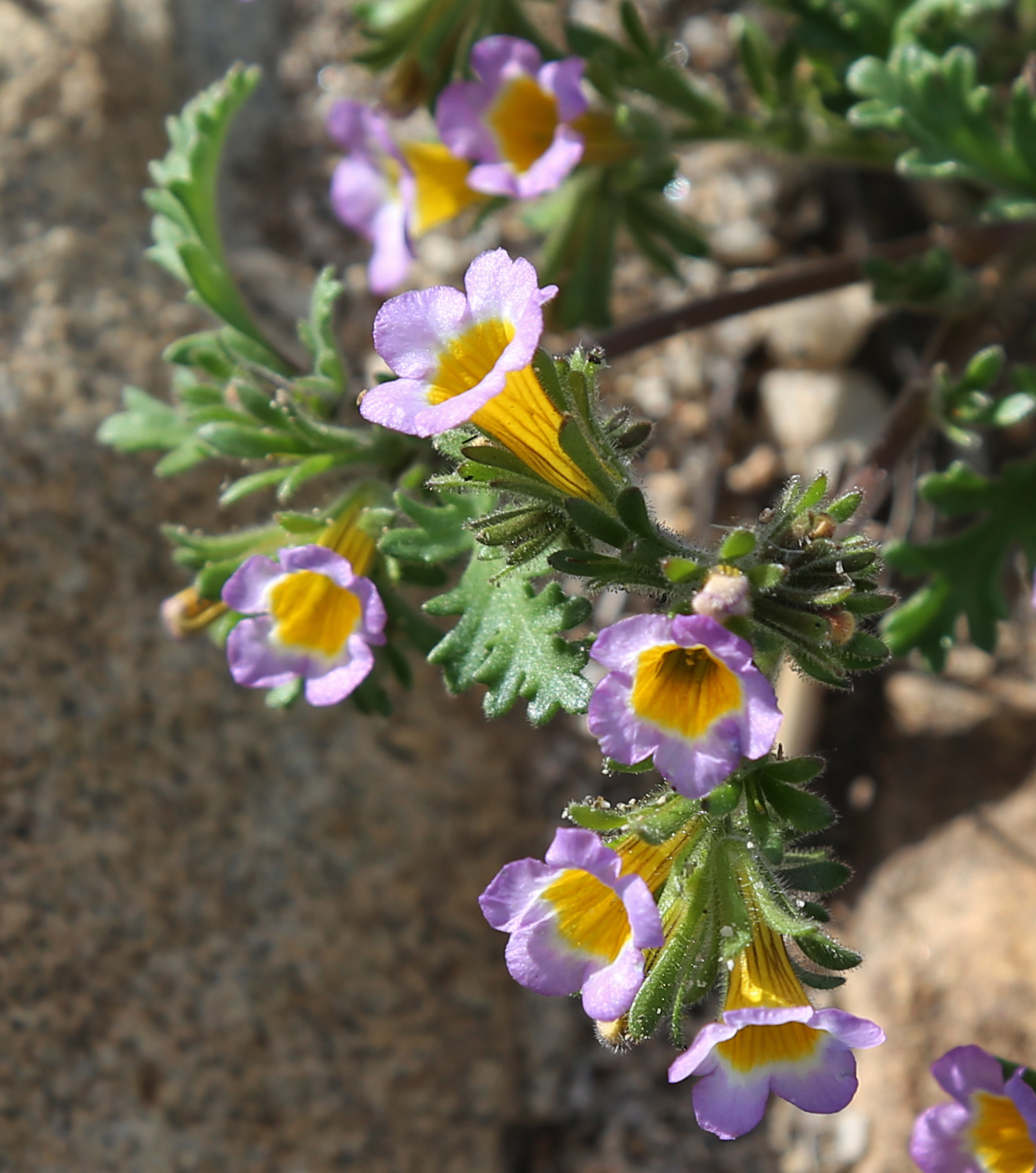
Phacelia bicolor

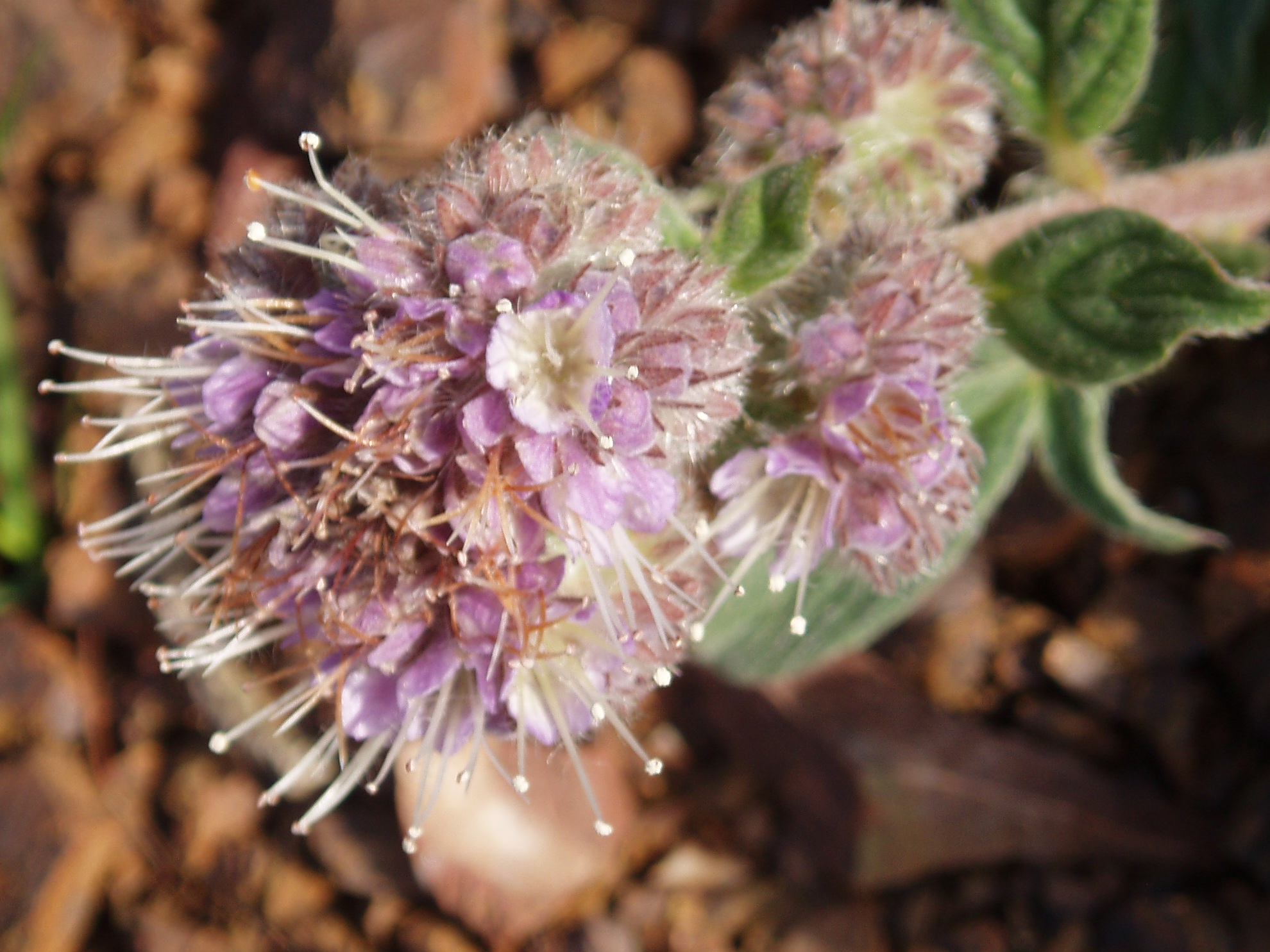
Phacelia californica

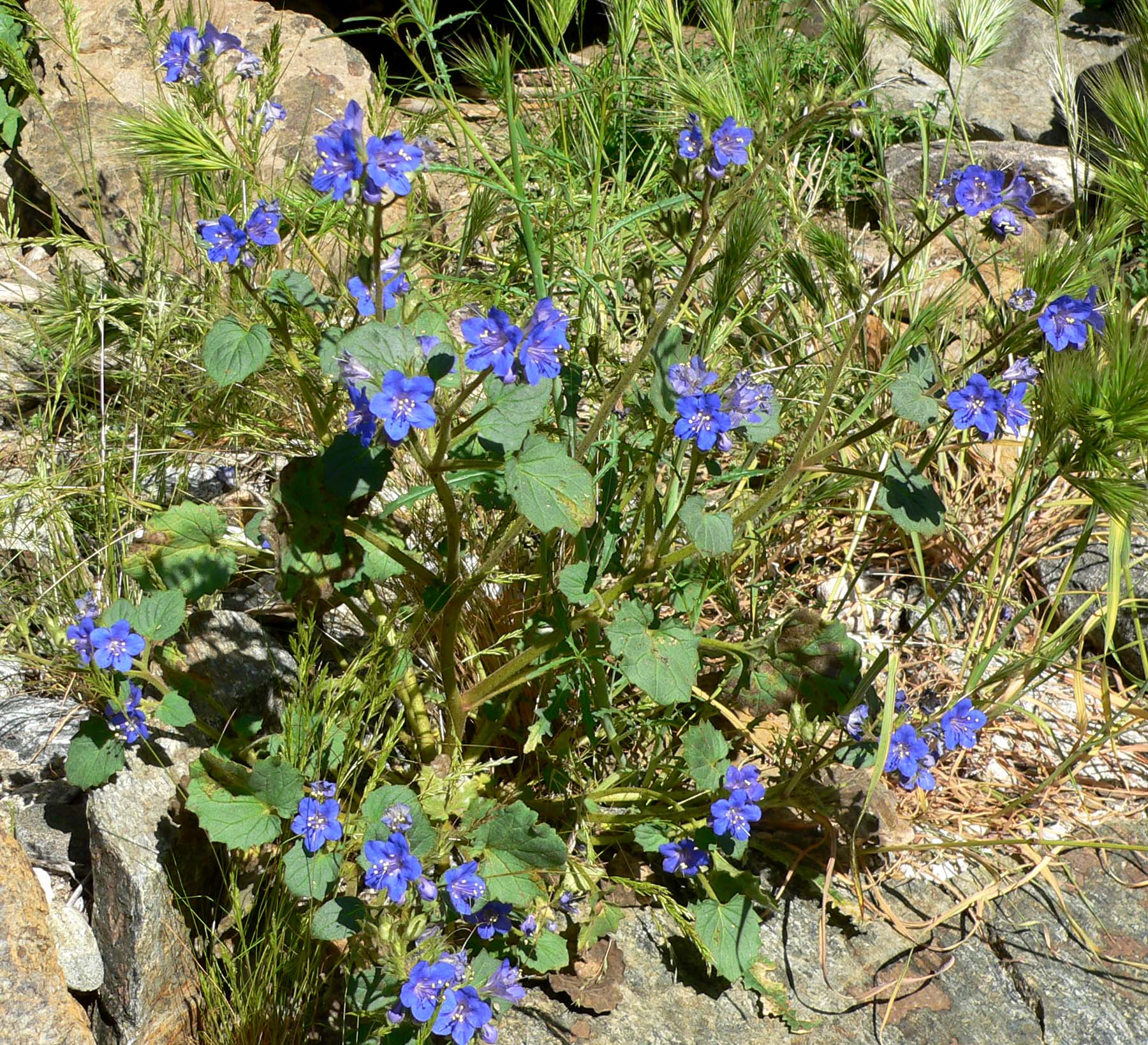
Phacelia campanularia

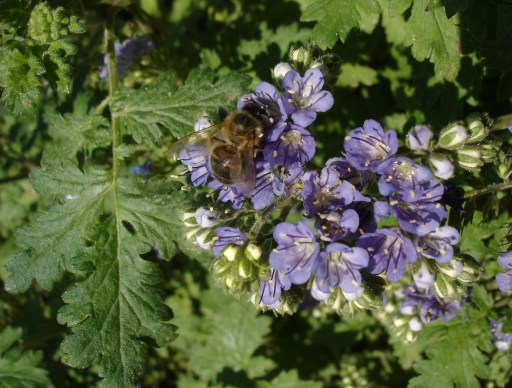
Phacelia congesta

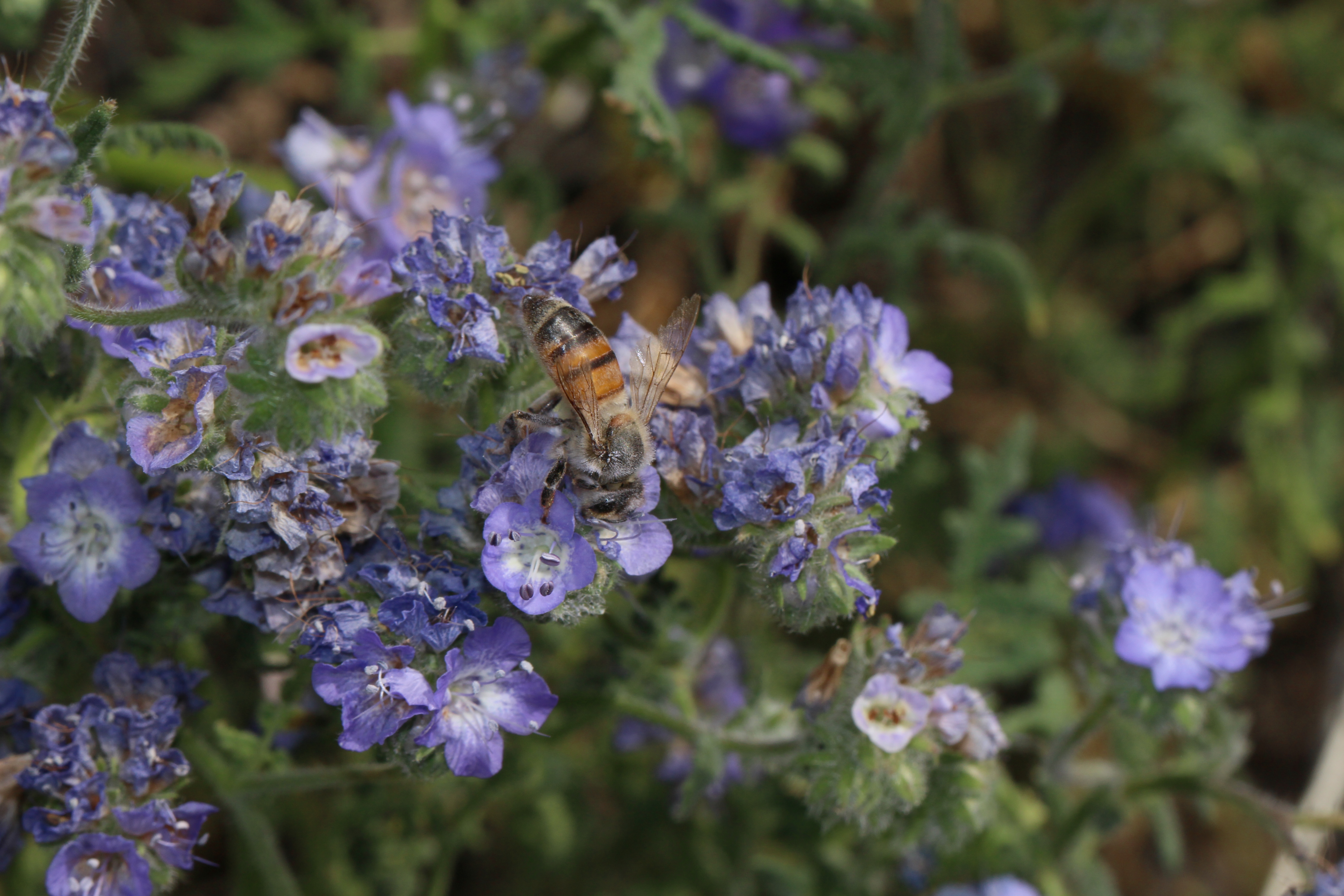
Phacelia distans

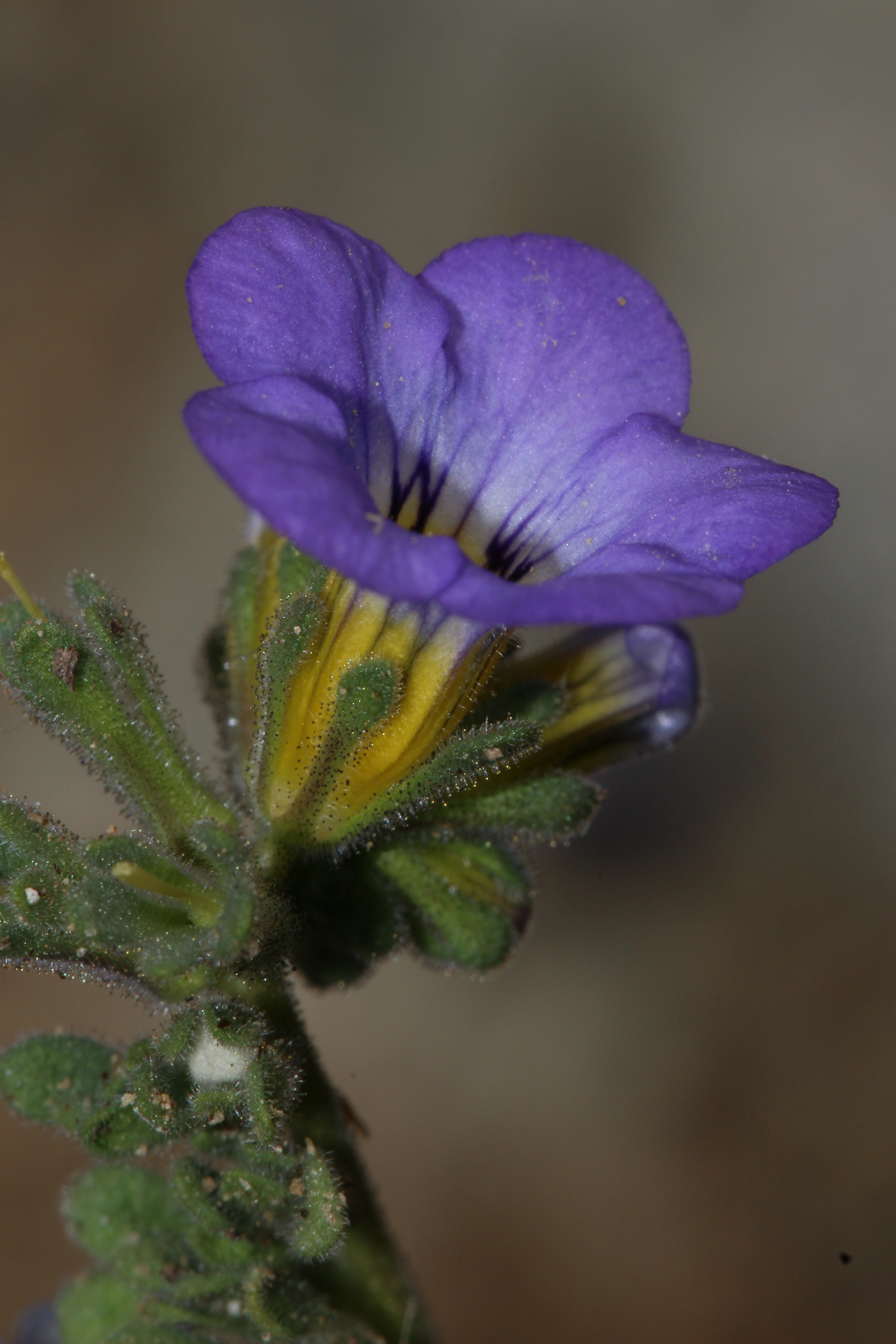
Phacelia fremontii

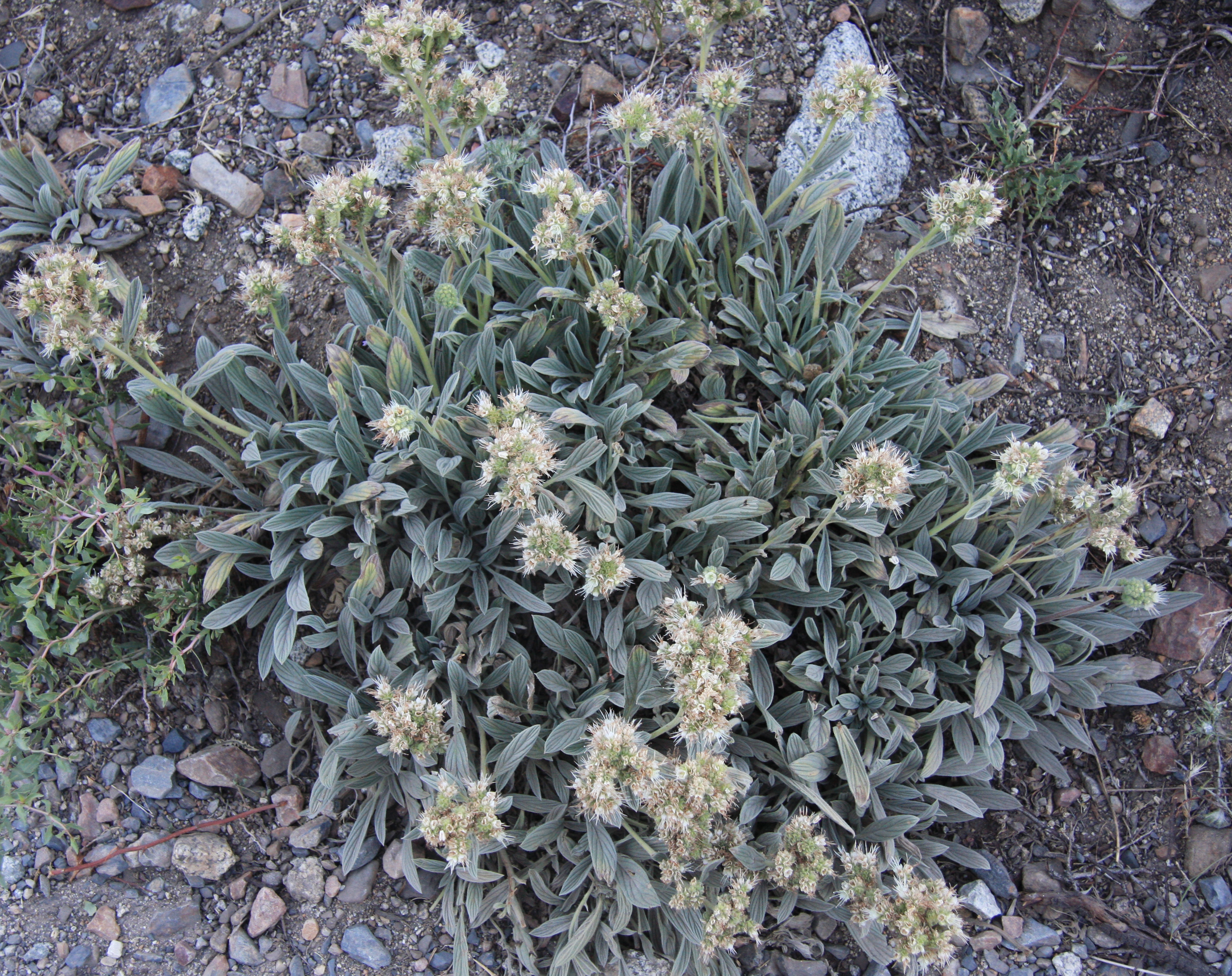
Phacelia hastata

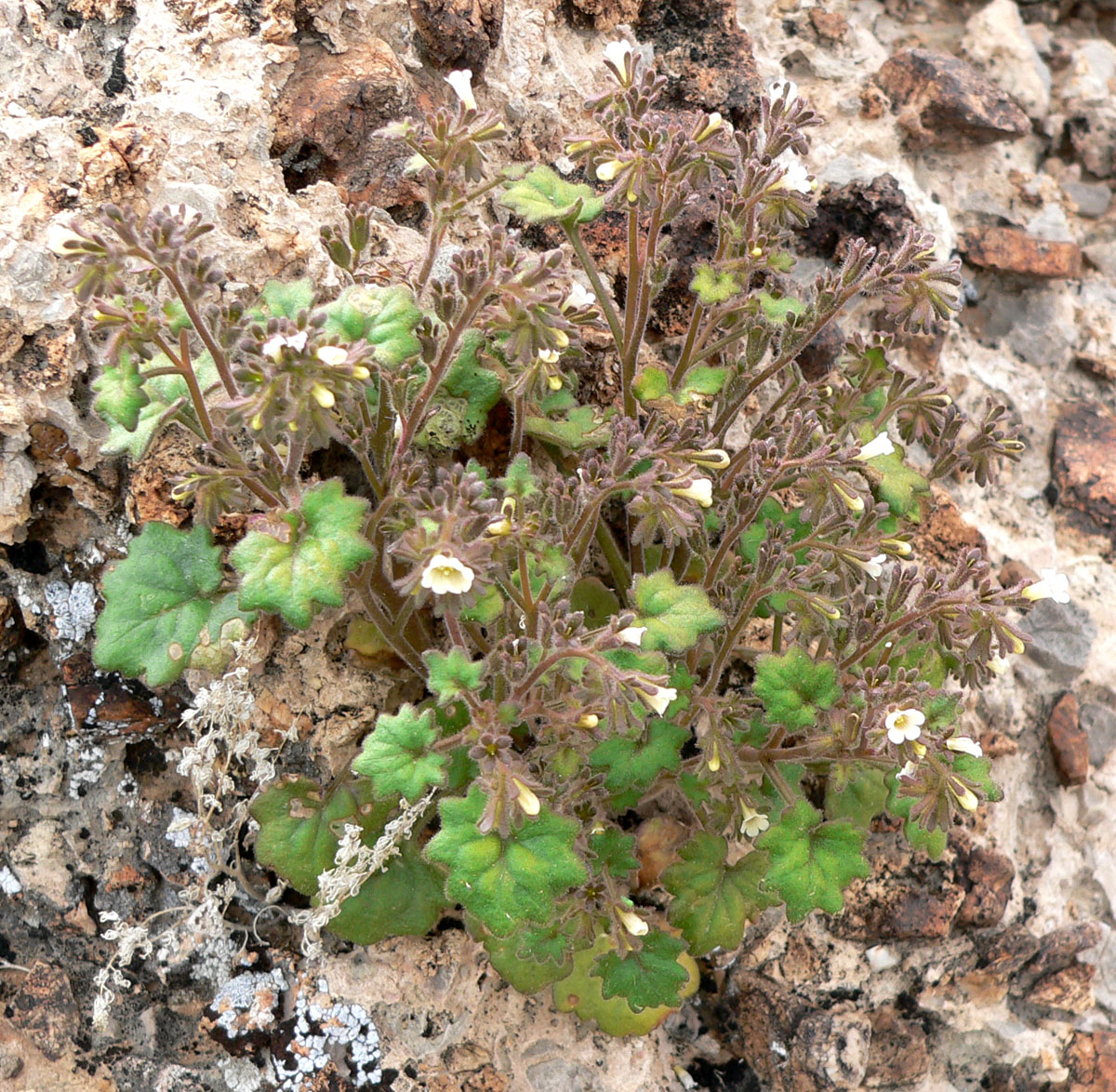
Phacelia rotundifolia

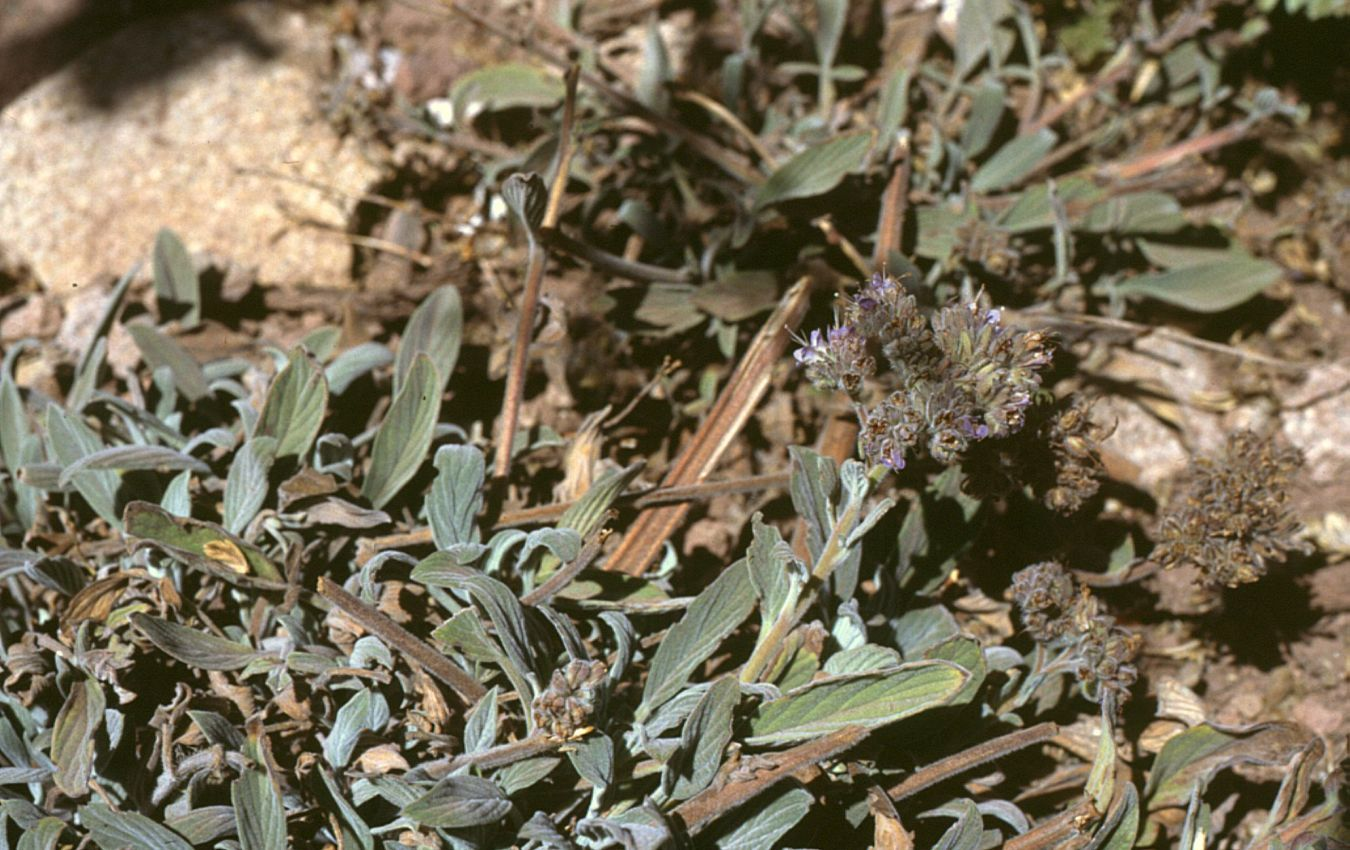
Phacelia secunda

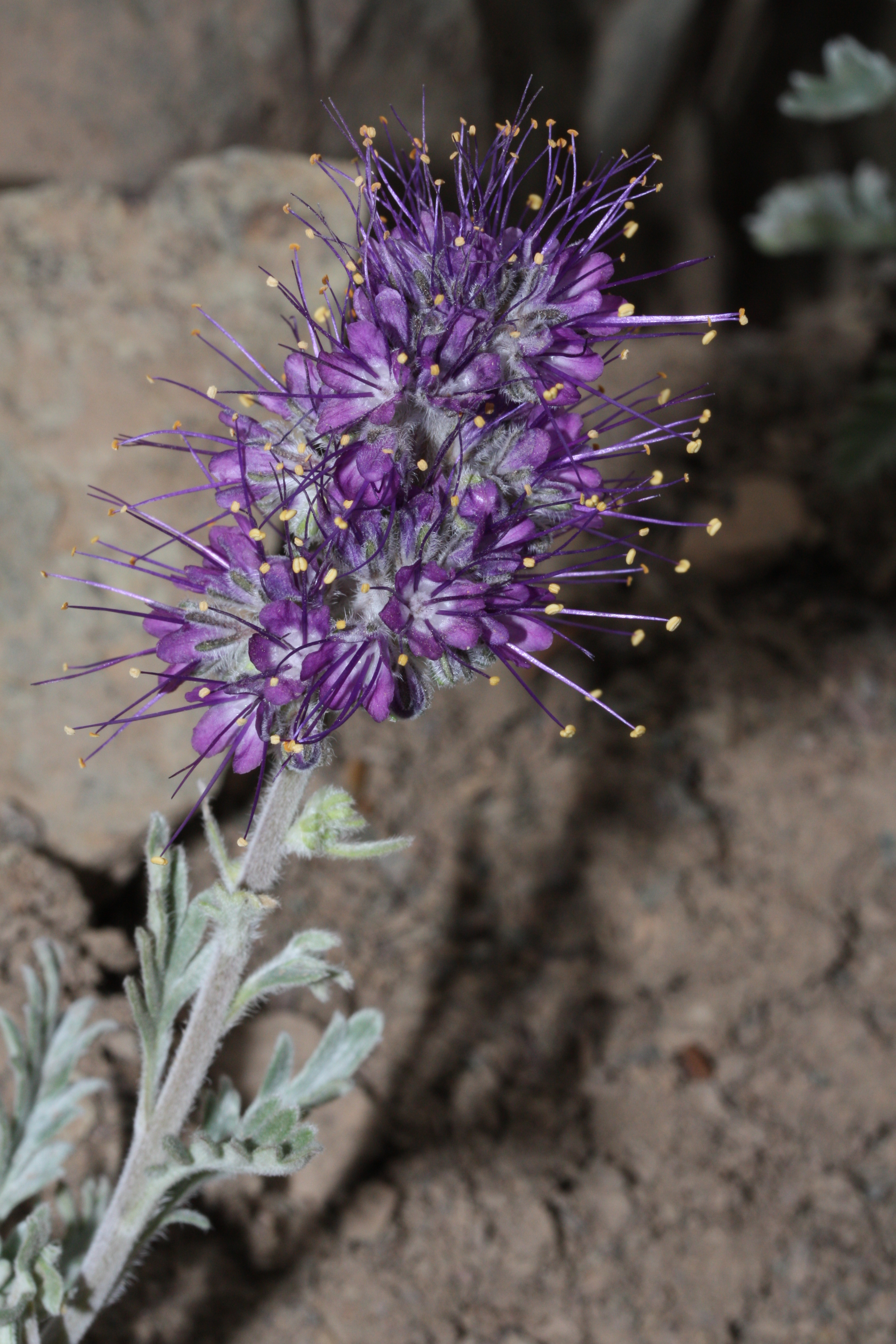
Phacelia sericea

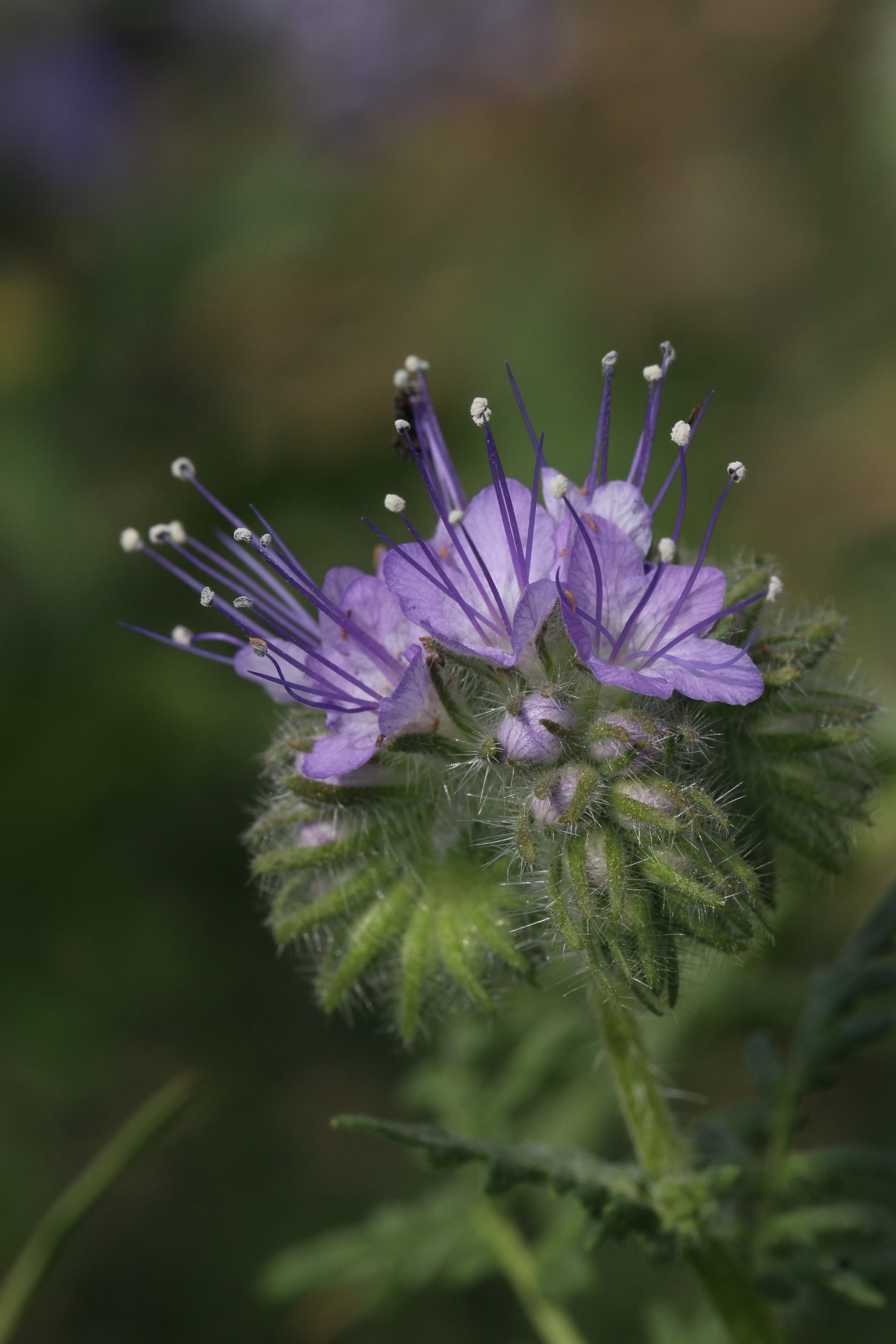
Phacelia tanacetifolia

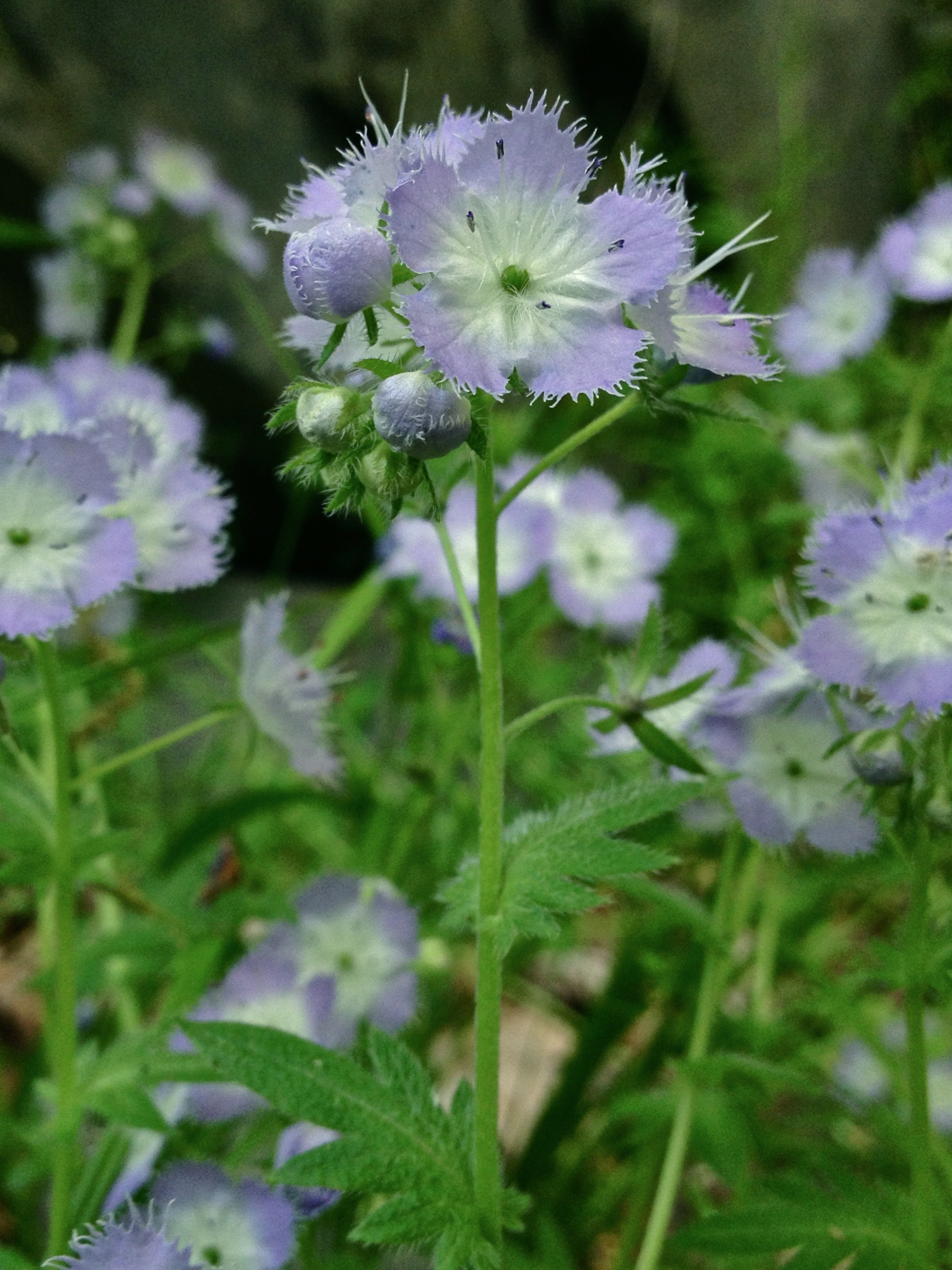
Phacelia purshii

== Dermatitis ==
There are reports that glandular hairs of stems, flowers and leaves of some species of Phacelia secrete oil droplets that can cause an unpleasant skin rash (contact dermatitis) in some people, specifically from P. brachyloba, P. campanularia, P. crenulata, P. gina-glenneae, P. grandiflora, P. ixodes, P. minor, and P. pedicellata. The major contact allergen of P. crenulata has been identified as geranylhydroquinone and of P. minor as geranylgeranylhydroquinone.

== See also ==
- List of Phacelia species
