= List of Canadian plants by family H =

Main page: List of Canadian plants by family

The following families of vascular plants are listed as occurring in Canada:

For mosses of Canada, see:

== Haemodoraceae ==
- Lachnanthes caroliana — Carolina redroot

== Haloragaceae ==
- Myriophyllum alterniflorum — alternate-flowered water-milfoil
- Myriophyllum farwellii — Farwell's water-milfoil
- Myriophyllum heterophyllum — broadleaf water-milfoil
- Myriophyllum hippuroides — western water-milfoil
- Myriophyllum humile — low water-milfoil
- Myriophyllum pinnatum — cutleaf water-milfoil
- Myriophyllum quitense — Andean water-milfoil
- Myriophyllum sibiricum — common water-milfoil
- Myriophyllum tenellum — slender water-milfoil
- Myriophyllum ussuriense — Asian water-milfoil
- Myriophyllum verticillatum — whorled water-milfoil
- Proserpinaca intermedia — intermediate mermaidweed
- Proserpinaca palustris — marsh mermaidweed
- Proserpinaca pectinata — combleaf mermaidweed

== Hamamelidaceae ==
- Hamamelis virginiana — American witch-hazel

== Hedwigiaceae ==
- Hedwigia ciliata — Hedwig's fringeleaf moss
- Hedwigia stellata
- Pseudobraunia californica

== Helodiaceae ==
- Helodium blandowii
- Helodium paludosum

== Herbertaceae ==
- Herbertus hawaiiensis

== Hippocastanaceae ==
- Aesculus glabra — Ohio buckeye

== Hippuridaceae ==
- Hippuris montana — mountain mare's-tail
- Hippuris tetraphylla — four-leaf mare's-tail
- Hippuris vulgaris — common mare's-tail

== Hookeriaceae ==
- Hookeria acutifolia
- Hookeria lucens

== Hydrangeaceae ==
- Philadelphus lewisii — Lewis' mock-orange
- Philadelphus trichothecus — Columbian mock-orange

== Hydrocharitaceae ==
- Elodea bifoliata — two-leaf waterweed
- Elodea canadensis — broad waterweed
- Elodea nuttallii — Nuttall's waterweed
- Vallisneria americana — eel-grass

== Hydrophyllaceae ==
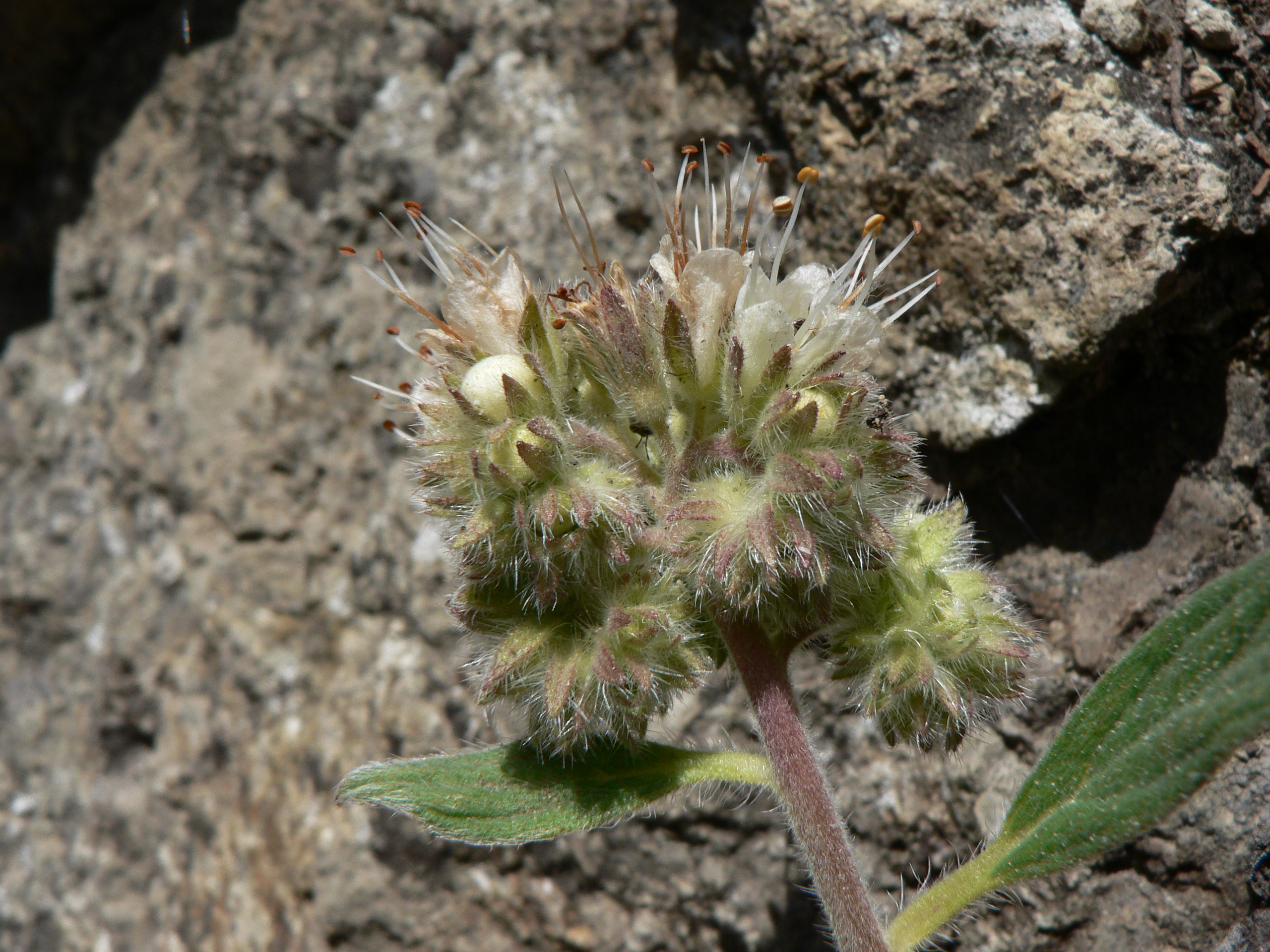
Phacelia hastata var. compacta Silver-leaf Phacelia, White-leaf Phacelia (pop)

- Ellisia nyctelea — nyctelea
- Hesperochiron pumilus — dwarf hesperochiron
- Hydrophyllum appendiculatum — appendage waterleaf
- Hydrophyllum canadense — bluntleaf waterleaf
- Hydrophyllum capitatum — dwarf waterleaf
- Hydrophyllum fendleri — Fendler's waterleaf
- Hydrophyllum tenuipes — Pacific waterleaf
- Hydrophyllum virginianum — John's-cabbage
- Nemophila breviflora — Great Basin nemophila
- Nemophila parviflora — smallflower nemophila
- Nemophila pedunculata — meadow baby-blue-eyes
- Phacelia franklinii — Franklin's phacelia
- Phacelia hastata — silverleaf scorpion-weed
- Phacelia leptosepala — narrowsepal scorpion-weed
- Phacelia linearis — linearleaf scorpion-weed
- Phacelia lyallii — Lyall's phacelia
- Phacelia mollis — Coffee Creek scorpion-weed
- Phacelia purshii — Miami-mist
- Phacelia ramosissima — branching scorpion-weed
- Phacelia sericea — silky scorpion-weed
- Romanzoffia sitchensis — Sitka mistmaid
- Romanzoffia tracyi — Tracy's mistmaid

== Hylocomiaceae ==
- Hylocomiastrum pyrenaicum
- Hylocomiastrum umbratum
- Hylocomium splendens — stairstep moss
- Loeskeobryum brevirostre
- Rhytidiadelphus loreus
- Rhytidiadelphus squarrosus
- Rhytidiadelphus triquetrus — shaggy moss
- Rhytidiopsis robusta — pipecleaner moss

== Hymenophyllaceae ==
- Hymenophyllum wrightii — Wright's filmy fern

== Hypnaceae ==
- Callicladium haldanianum
- Ctenidium malacodes
- Ctenidium molluscum
- Ctenidium schofieldii
- Gollania turgens
- Herzogiella adscendens
- Herzogiella seligeri
- Herzogiella striatella
- Herzogiella turfacea
- Homomallium adnatum
- Hypnum bambergeri
- Hypnum callichroum
- Hypnum circinale
- Hypnum cupressiforme
- Hypnum curvifolium
- Hypnum dieckii
- Hypnum fertile
- Hypnum hamulosum
- Hypnum holmenii
- Hypnum imponens — hypnum moss
- Hypnum jutlandicum
- Hypnum lindbergii — Lindberg's hypnum moss
- Hypnum mammillatum
- Hypnum pallescens
- Hypnum plicatulum
- Hypnum pratense
- Hypnum procerrimum
- Hypnum recurvatum
- Hypnum revolutum — revolute hypnum moss
- Hypnum subimponens
- Hypnum vaucheri
- Isopterygiopsis muelleriana
- Isopterygiopsis pulchella
- Isopterygium tenerum
- Orthothecium chryseum
- Orthothecium intricatum
- Orthothecium strictum
- Platydictya confervoides — algæ-like matted-moss
- Platydictya jungermannioides
- Platydictya minutissima
- Platydictya subtilis
- Platygyrium repens
- Pseudotaxiphyllum distichaceum — pseudotaxiphyllum moss
- Pseudotaxiphyllum elegans
- Ptilium crista-castrensis — knight's plume
- Pylaisiella intricata
- Pylaisiella polyantha
- Pylaisiella selwynii
- Taxiphyllum deplanatum
- Taxiphyllum taxirameum
- Tripterocladium leucocladulum

== Hypopterygiaceae ==
- Hypopterygium fauriei
