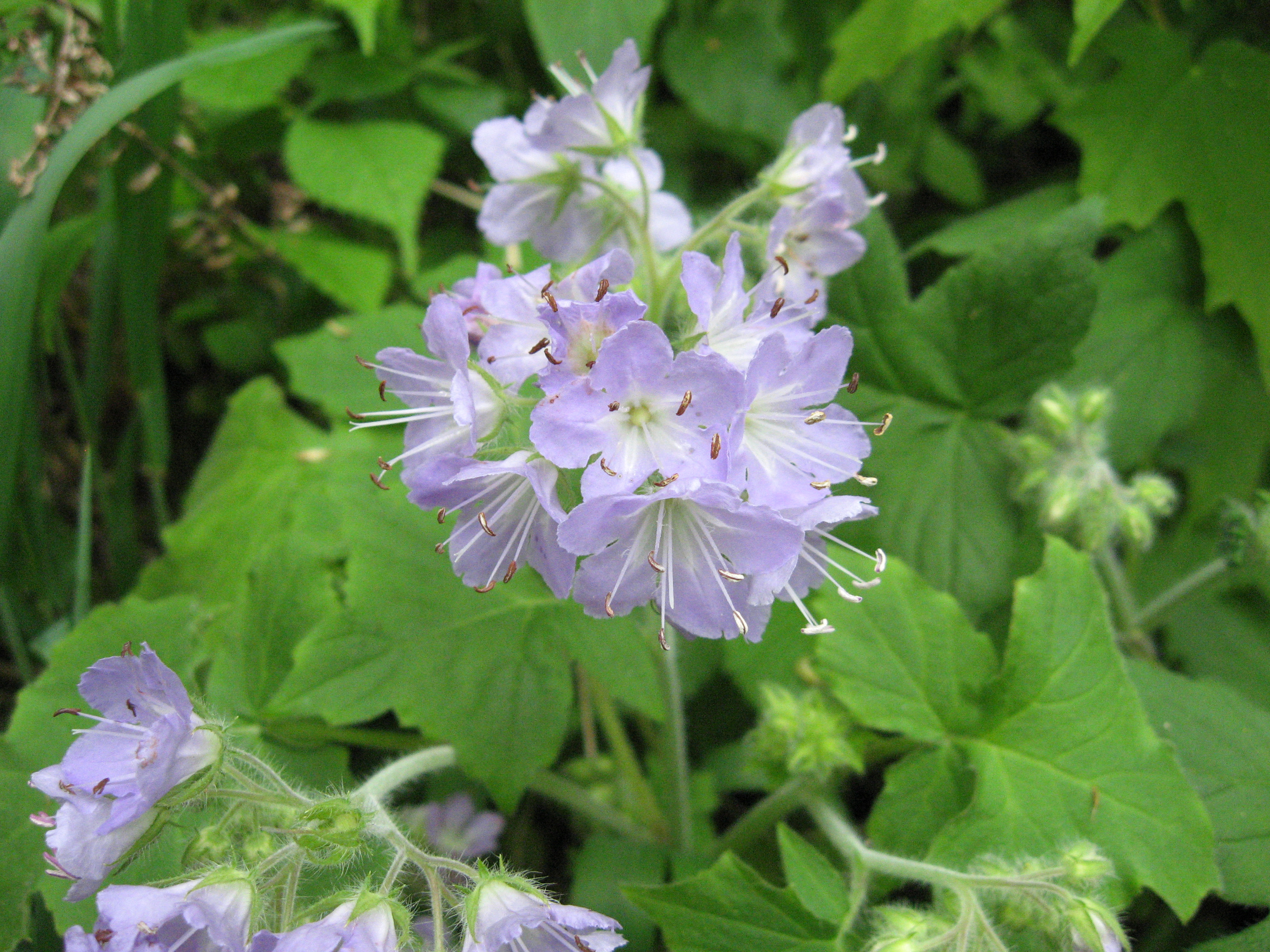

Conservation status
- Secure (NatureServe)

Scientific classification
- Kingdom: Plantae
- Clade: Tracheophytes
- Clade: Angiosperms
- Clade: Eudicots
- Clade: Asterids
- Order: Boraginales
- Family: Hydrophyllaceae
- Genus: Hydrophyllum
- Species: H. appendiculatum

Binomial name
- Hydrophyllum appendiculatum Michx.

Synonyms
- Decemium appendiculatum

= Hydrophyllum appendiculatum =

Species of flowering plant

Hydrophyllum appendiculatum, commonly known as great waterleaf, appendage waterleaf, or woolen breeches, is native to central and eastern North America where it is found primarily in the Midwest and Upper South of the United States. It is a biennial that produces lavender-colored flowers in late spring and early summer. The genus Hydrophyllum is placed in the family Hydrophyllaceae.

== Description ==
H. appendiculatum is a biennial herbaceous plant that grows to a height of 30–76 centimetres (1–2.5 ft) with branching, hairy stems. The leaves are also hairy, alternate, and about 8–15 centimetres (3–6 in) long and across. The lower leaves are longer than they are wide, and the middle and upper leaves are more rounded. All the leaves are cleft into 3 to 5 lobes.

The inflorescence is a loose cluster, or cyme of pinkish purple or lavender flowers at the ends of the stems and branches rising above the leaves, 5–8 centimetres (2–3 in) long. Each flower is 1–2 centimetres (.5–.8 in) across. The calyces have short, triangular appendages flaring away at the sinuses.

This species can be distinguished from Hydrophyllum canadense, which has a similar appearance and broad geographical overlap, by the presence of small appendages in the sinuses of the calyx of H. appendiculatum. In addition, H. canadense and another similar plant, Hydrophyllum virginianum, have less hairy stems than H. appendiculatum.

== Distribution and habitat ==
H. appendiculum is native to the United States from Nebraska and Kansas to the west, Mississippi and Alabama to the south, the Canadian border to the north, and New York to the east. In Canada, it is native to Ontario. Its natural habitat is mesic calcareous forests, bottomland woods, bases of bluffs, quarries, and slopes.

== Ecology ==
Flowers bloom May to July and attract a variety of bees, flies, butterflies, and skippers.
