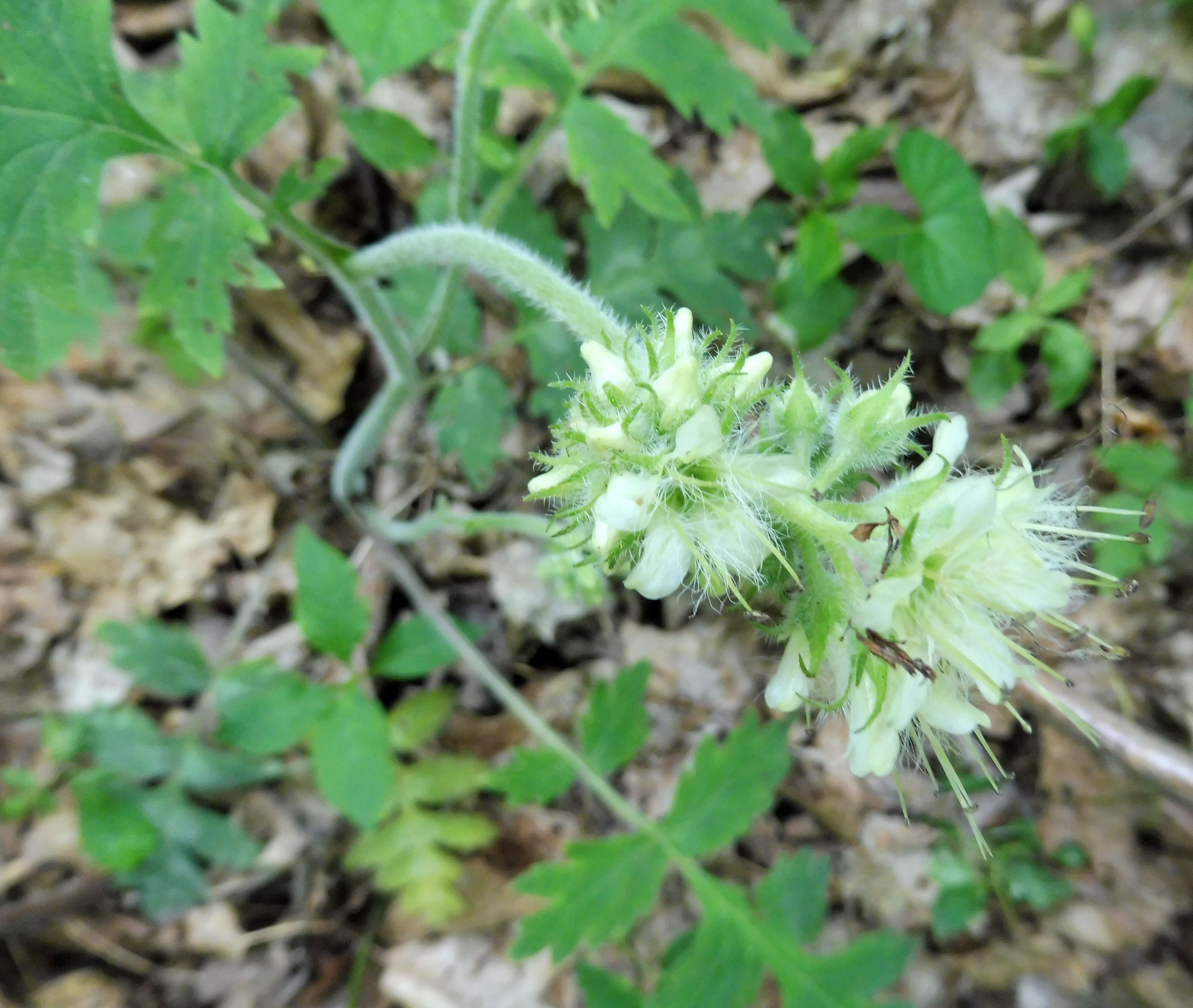

Scientific classification
- Kingdom: Plantae
- Clade: Tracheophytes
- Clade: Angiosperms
- Clade: Eudicots
- Clade: Asterids
- Order: Boraginales
- Family: Hydrophyllaceae
- Genus: Hydrophyllum
- Species: H. macrophyllum

Binomial name
- Hydrophyllum macrophyllum Nuttall

= Hydrophyllum macrophyllum =

Species of flowering plant

Hydrophyllum macrophyllum, commonly known as the hairy waterleaf or largeleaf waterleaf, is native to the eastern United States where it is found primarily in the Midwest and Upper South. The genus Hydrophyllum is placed in the family Hydrophyllaceae.

Its natural habitat is forests with mesic, rocky, calcareous soil. It is a perennial that produces cream-colored flowers in late spring.
