= Hydrophyllum brownei =

Scientific classification
- Kingdom: Plantae
- Clade: Tracheophytes
- Clade: Angiosperms
- Clade: Eudicots
- Clade: Asterids
- Order: Boraginales
- Family: Hydrophyllaceae
- Genus: Hydrophyllum
- Species: H. brownei

Binomial name
- Hydrophyllum brownei Kral & V.M.Bates

Species of flowering plant

Hydrophyllum brownei, or Browne's waterleaf, is a rare North American plant species found only in the Ouachita Mountains in Arkansas. It grows in forested hillsides above the Cossatot River in Howard County, as well as in Polk and Garland Counties.

Hydrophyllum brownei is an herb up to 50 cm (20 inches) tall, spreading by means of underground rhizomes. Leaves are pinnately compound, the leaflets very often pinnately lobed, with short bristly hairs. Flowers are lavender to almost white, 10–12 mm long.
