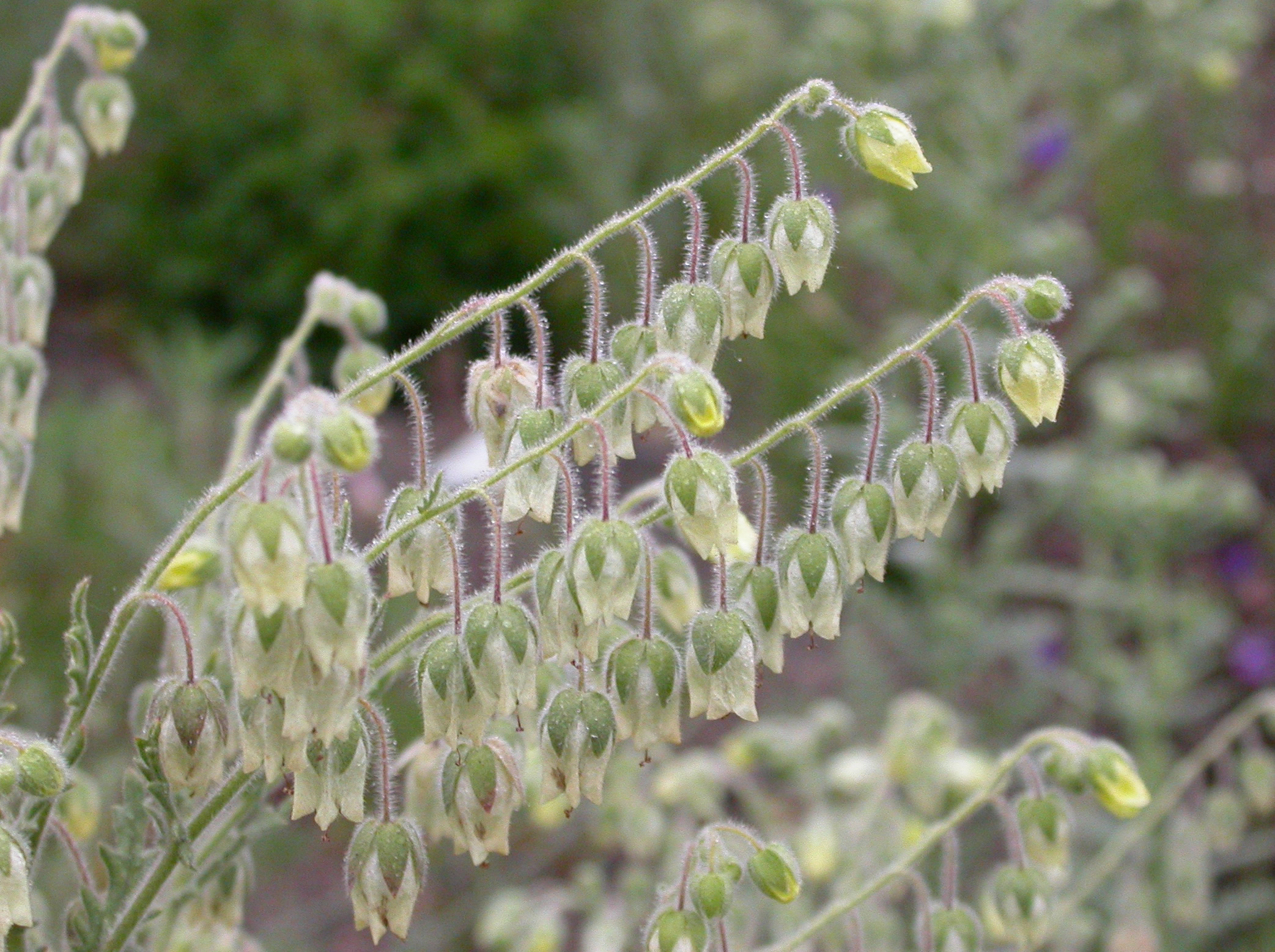

Scientific classification
- Kingdom: Plantae
- Clade: Tracheophytes
- Clade: Angiosperms
- Clade: Eudicots
- Clade: Asterids
- Order: Boraginales
- Family: Hydrophyllaceae
- Genus: Emmenanthe; Benth.
- Species: E. penduliflora

Binomial name
- Emmenanthe penduliflora Benth. (1835)

= Emmenanthe penduliflora =

Genus of flowering plants in the borage family Boraginaceae

Emmenanthe penduliflora, known by the common name whispering bells, is a species of flowering plant. The genus Emmenanthe is placed in the family Hydrophyllaceae. This grassland wildflower is native to California, though it can also be found in other locations within western North America.

== Description ==
Emmenanthe penduliflora has fleshy foliage which exudes a sticky juice with a light medicinal odor. The plant comes up from a weedy-looking basal rosette of sharply lobed leaves. Inflorescence is a terminal cluster of flowers, borne on slender pedicels less than 1 inch long. Blooms have five sepals and five yellow or pinkish petals in a bell-shaped. Flowers dry and become light and papery. The dry hanging flowers make a rustling sound when a breeze comes through, giving the whispering bells its common name. The dry flower also contains a fruit about a centimeter wide.

== Distribution and habitat ==
This flower is most common in dry, recently burned areas; germination of the seeds may be triggered by the presence of burned plant material. It is a common plant of the chaparral ecosystem, which is prone to wildfire.

In Mexico, this species is found on the two states of the Baja California Peninsula. In Baja California, it is common in the northwestern part of the state, and ranges into the Central Desert. In Baja California Sur, it is found on the Vizcaino Peninsula. Additionally, this species also grows on Guadalupe Island in the Pacific Ocean.
