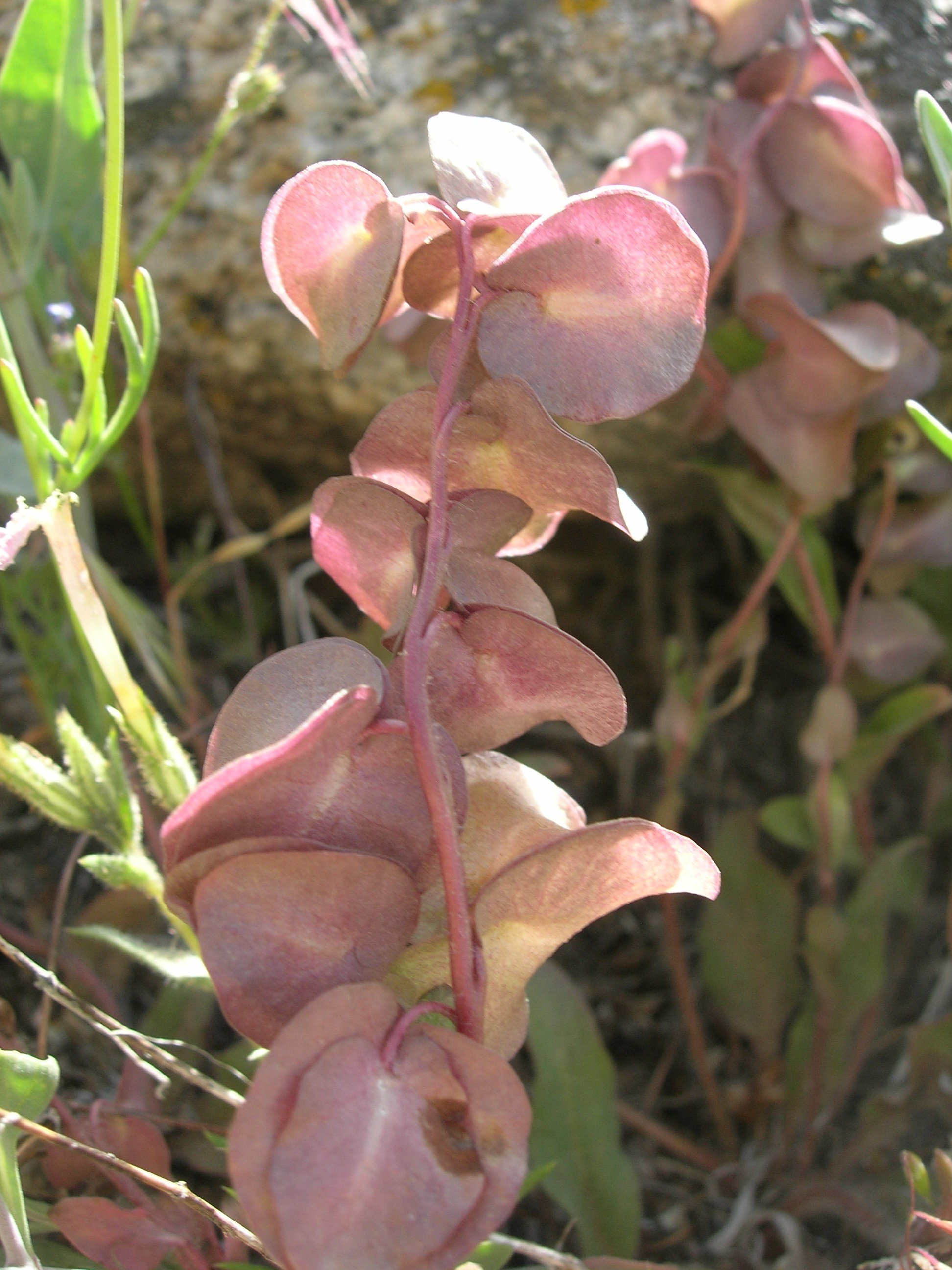

Scientific classification
- Kingdom: Plantae
- Clade: Tracheophytes
- Clade: Angiosperms
- Clade: Eudicots
- Clade: Asterids
- Order: Boraginales
- Family: Hydrophyllaceae
- Genus: Tricardia; Torr. ex S.Watson
- Species: T. watsonii

Binomial name
- Tricardia watsonii Torr. ex S.Watson

= Tricardia =

Genus of plants

Tricardia is a monotypic genus of flowering plants in the family Hydrophyllaceae containing the single species Tricardia watsonii. The species is known by the common name threehearts. It is native to the southwestern United States, where it grows in deserts and mountains in sandy open habitat, often beneath shrubs. It is a perennial herb growing from a taproot and a woody caudex covered with the shreddy remains of previous seasons' herbage. It produces several erect stems up to about 40 centimeters tall. Most of the leaves are located in a basal rosette about the caudex. They are lance-shaped and coated thinly in woolly hairs. They are up to 9 centimeters long and are borne on petioles. A few smaller leaves occur higher on the stem. Flowers occur in a loose cyme at the top of the stem. Each has a calyx of five sepals. The outer three are heart-shaped and green to pink or purple in color, and the inner two are much smaller and narrower. The flower within is bell-shaped, white with central purple markings, and roughly half a centimeter wide. The fruit is a capsule just under a centimeter long which contains 4 to 8 seeds.
