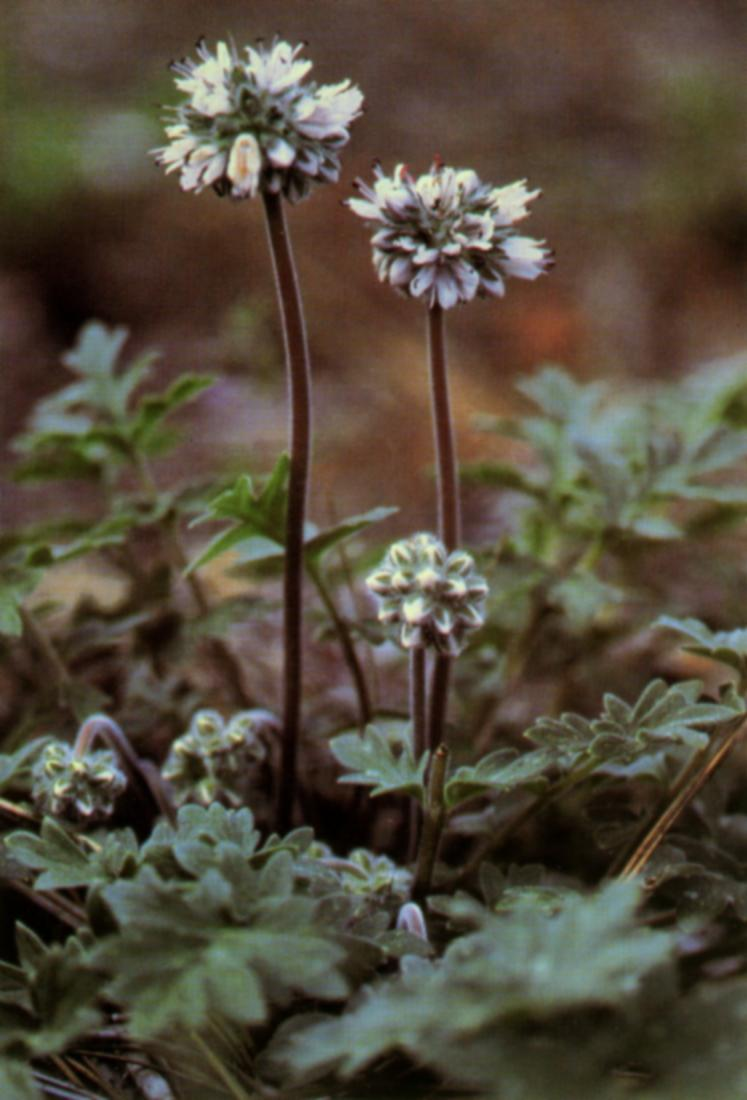

Scientific classification
- Kingdom: Plantae
- Clade: Tracheophytes
- Clade: Angiosperms
- Clade: Eudicots
- Clade: Asterids
- Order: Boraginales
- Family: Hydrophyllaceae
- Genus: Hydrophyllum
- Species: H. occidentale

Binomial name
- Hydrophyllum occidentale (S.Wats.) Gray

= Hydrophyllum occidentale =

Species of flowering plant

Hydrophyllum occidentale is a species of flowering plant in the waterleaf family Hydrophyllaceae known by the common name western waterleaf.

== Distribution ==
It is native to the western United States from California to Idaho, where it grows in a variety of habitats from wet mountain meadows to dry chaparral slopes.

== Description ==
This is a rhizomatous perennial herb producing a patch of leaves, most of which are made up of many pairs of oval-shaped, bluntly lobed green leaflets. These compound leaves may be up to 40 centimeters long. The plant produces erect stems branching into green to reddish-purple rough-haired, leafless peduncles bearing inflorescences.

The inflorescence is a large ball of densely packed flowers. Each flower is up to a centimeter wide and bright white to lavender. It is coated in downy white hairs and has a long protruding style and usually five stamens with large purple or red anthers. The fruit is a spherical capsule containing two seeds. The inflorescence of Hydrophyllum occidentale occurs above the leaf canopy.
