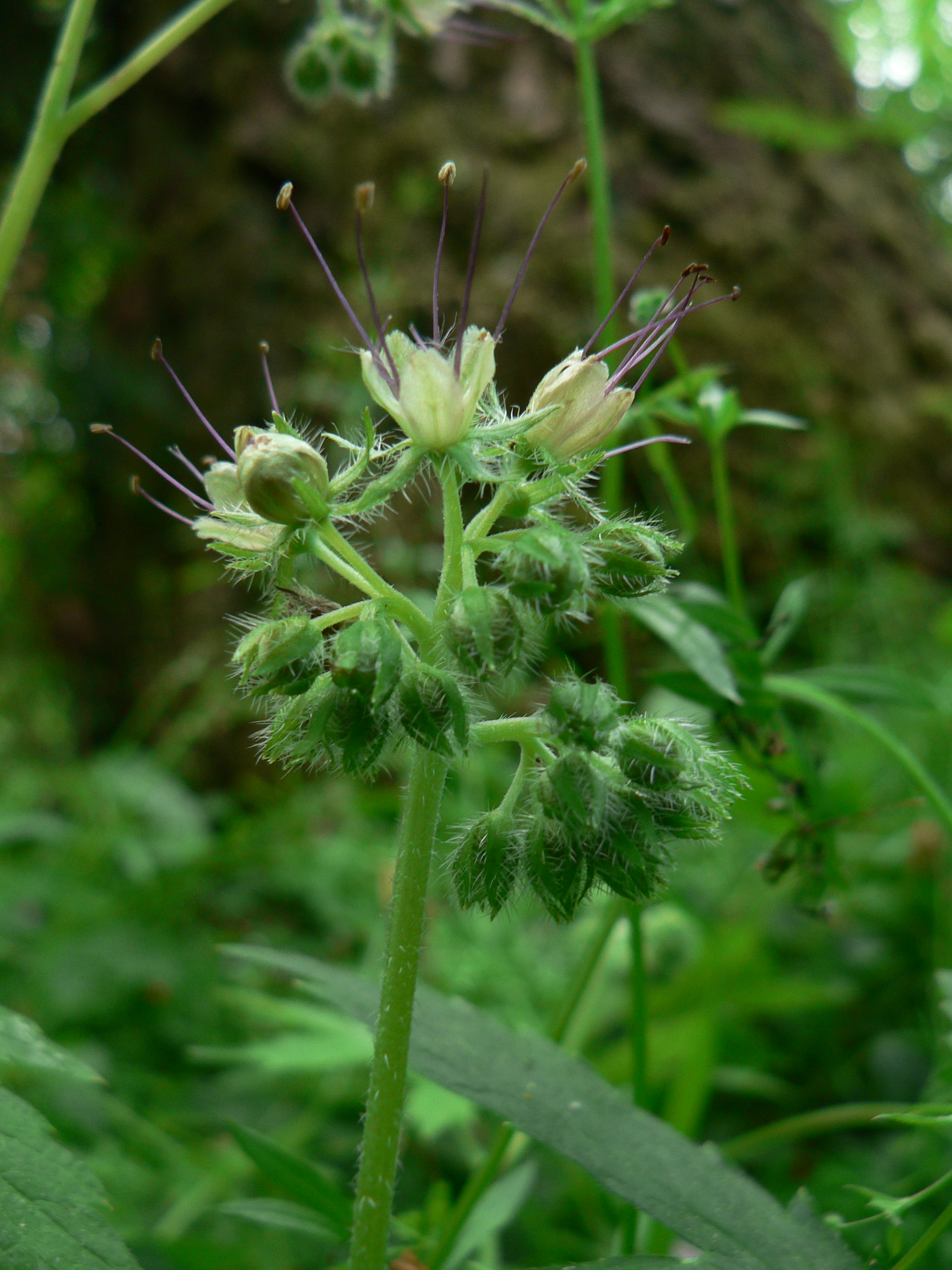

Scientific classification
- Kingdom: Plantae
- Clade: Tracheophytes
- Clade: Angiosperms
- Clade: Eudicots
- Clade: Asterids
- Order: Boraginales
- Family: Hydrophyllaceae
- Genus: Hydrophyllum
- Species: H. tenuipes

Binomial name
- Hydrophyllum tenuipes L.

= Hydrophyllum tenuipes =

Species of plant

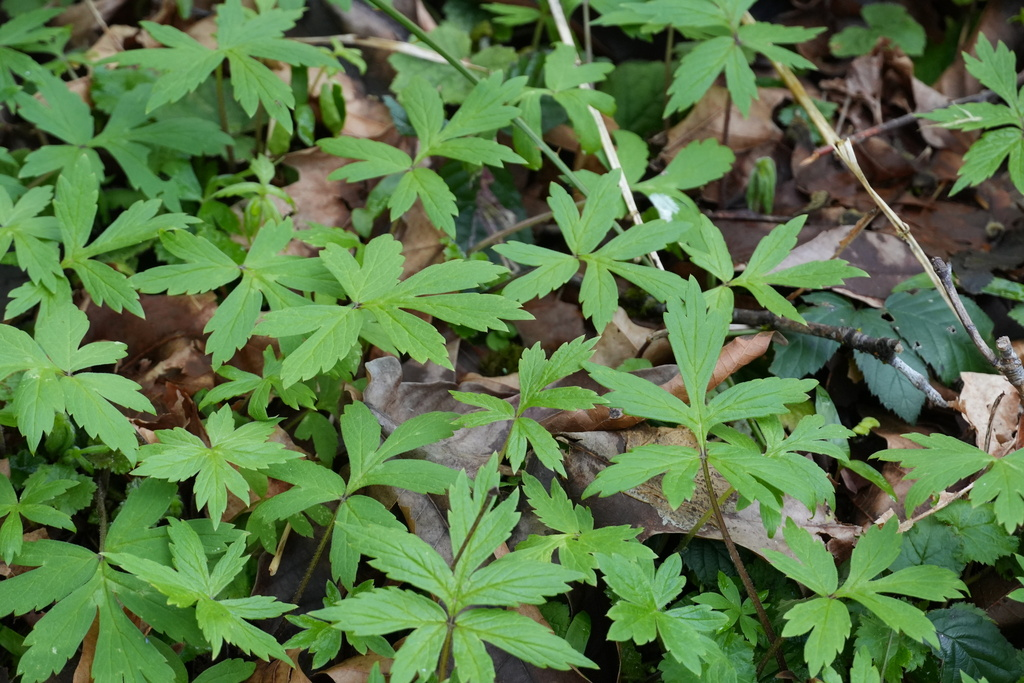
Pacific waterleaf foliage

Hydrophyllum tenuipes, Pacific waterleaf or slender-stemmed waterleaf, is an herbaceous perennial plant native to North America. It is found in western North America from British Columbia to northern California.

== Description ==
The leaves are alternate on solitary stems and up to 15 centimeters (5.9 inches) long and wide. They are divided into five segments (up to nine).

The flowers form in numerous clusters on stalks extending from upper leaf axils. Flowers are greenish-white to lavender, appearing in mid to late spring. Five conspicuous stamen extend beyond the five petals to a length more than twice as long as the petals. Sepals bristly on margins.

== Ecology ==
The Hydrophyllum tenuipes plant spreads by rhizomes to form large colonies in wooded areas. It prefers moist, well drained soils.

== Range ==
Hydrophyllum tenuipes grows at low to mid elevation in shady conditions often in close association with Tolmiea menziesii (Youth on Age), which blooms during the same period.
