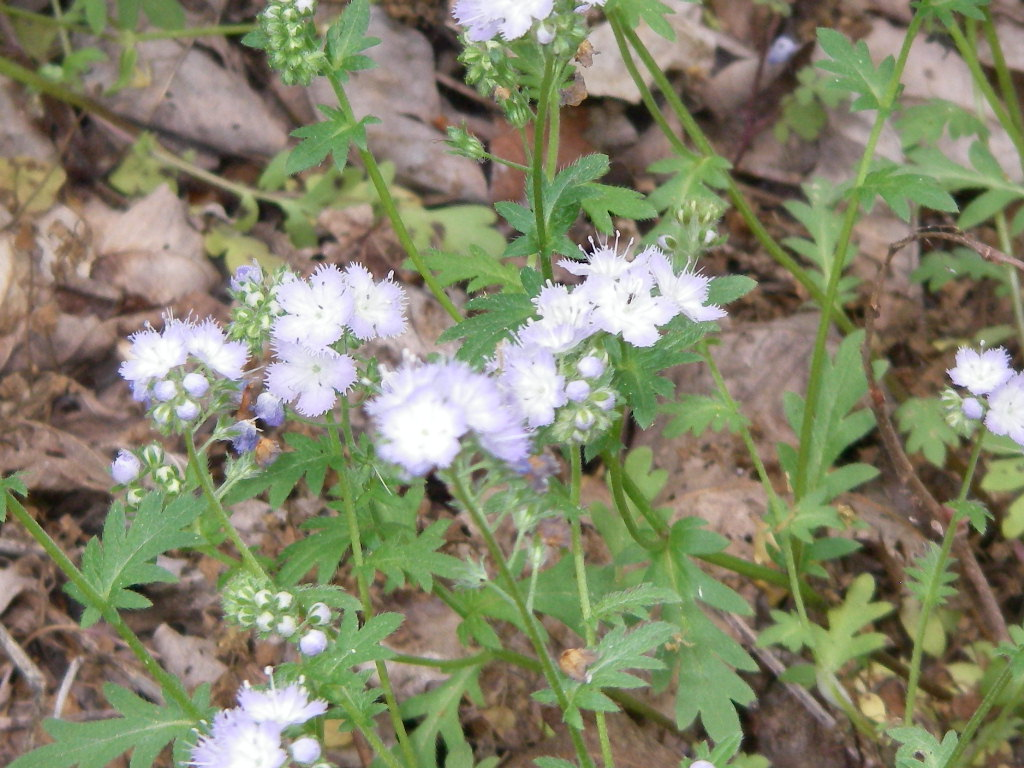

Conservation status
- Secure (NatureServe)

Scientific classification
- Kingdom: Plantae
- Clade: Tracheophytes
- Clade: Angiosperms
- Clade: Eudicots
- Clade: Asterids
- Order: Boraginales
- Family: Hydrophyllaceae
- Genus: Phacelia
- Species: P. purshii

Binomial name
- Phacelia purshii Buckl.

Synonyms
- Phacelia bicknellii Small; Phacelia boykinii (A.Gray) Small

= Phacelia purshii =

Species of plant

Phacelia purshii, known by the common names Miami mist, scorpionweed, and purple scorpionweed, is a spring flowering annual forb with blue, lavender, violet, or nearly white flowers in the family Hydrophyllaceae that is native to eastern and central North America.

== Description ==
P. purshii is a delicate plant that grows to 30–45 centimetres (12–18 in) tall with slender, branching stems. Its leaves are alternate, have many sharply pointed lobes and are up to 8 centimetres (3 in) long. The lower leaves on the plant have a petiole, while the upper leaves are sessile.

The inflorescence is a loose scorpioid cyme (the axis is curved like the tail of a scorpion), with 8 to 30 flowers. Flowers are light blue, violet, lavender, or nearly white with pale centers, and they have 5 fringed lobes.

== Etymology ==
The genus name Phacelia is from the Greek word for "cluster", referring to the grouping of the flowers. The specific epithet purshii honors the German botanist Frederick Traugott Pursh, who claimed to discover the plant. The common name Miami mist probably refers to the Miami people who lived in the Great Lakes region and the appearance of the flowers when they grow to cover large areas.

== Distribution and habitat ==
It is native to the Appalachian Mountains and adjacent regions from Alabama to Pennsylvania, with additional populations in the Tennessee/Ohio Valley, the mid-section of the Mississippi Valley (Illinois, Missouri, Arkansas) and the Great Lakes region (Ohio, Michigan, Ontario, etc.). It grows in floodplain forests and alluvial clearings.

== Ecology ==
The flowers bloom in the early spring, from April to June. They attract a variety of bees and butterflies.

== Gallery ==
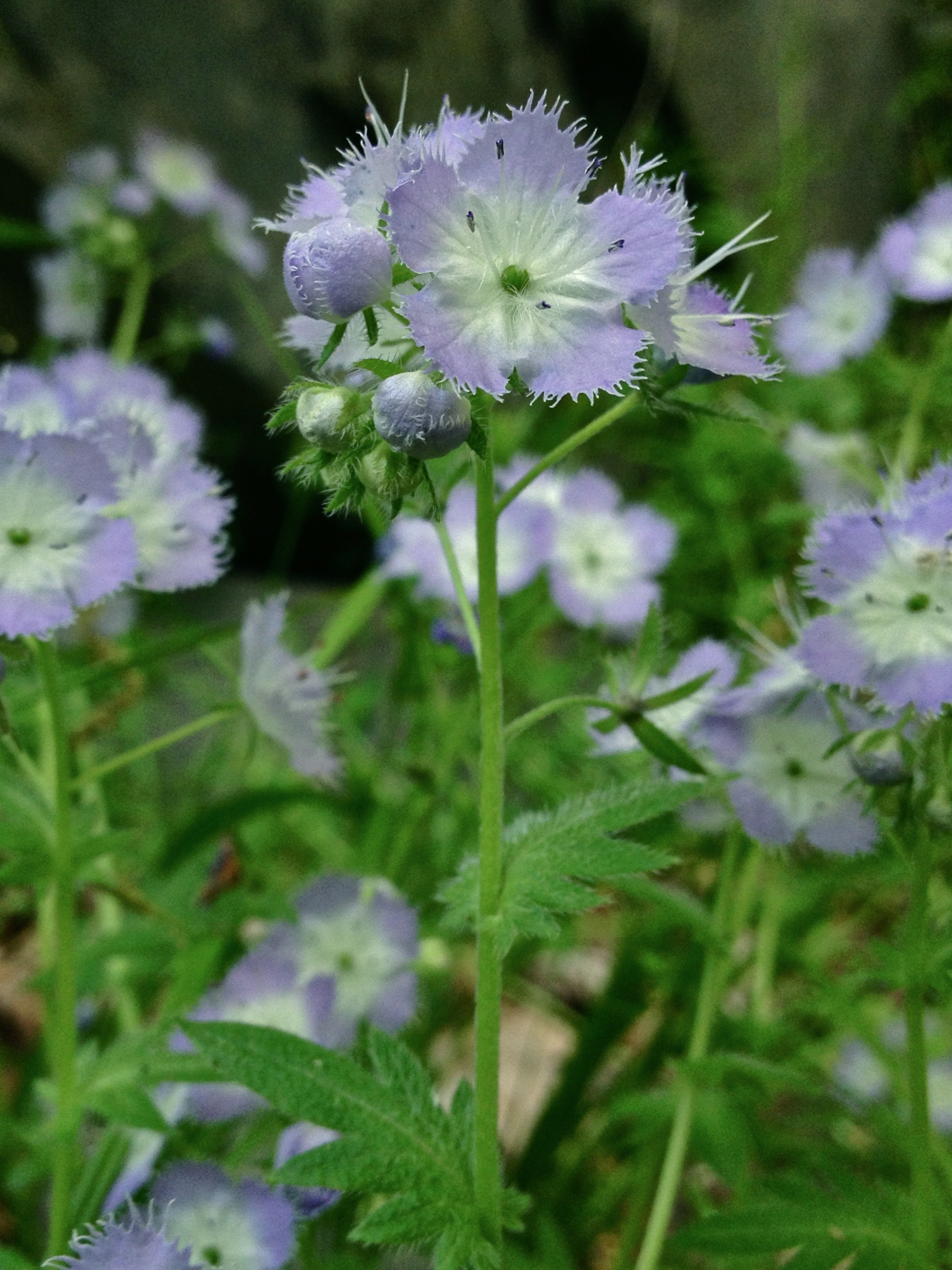
