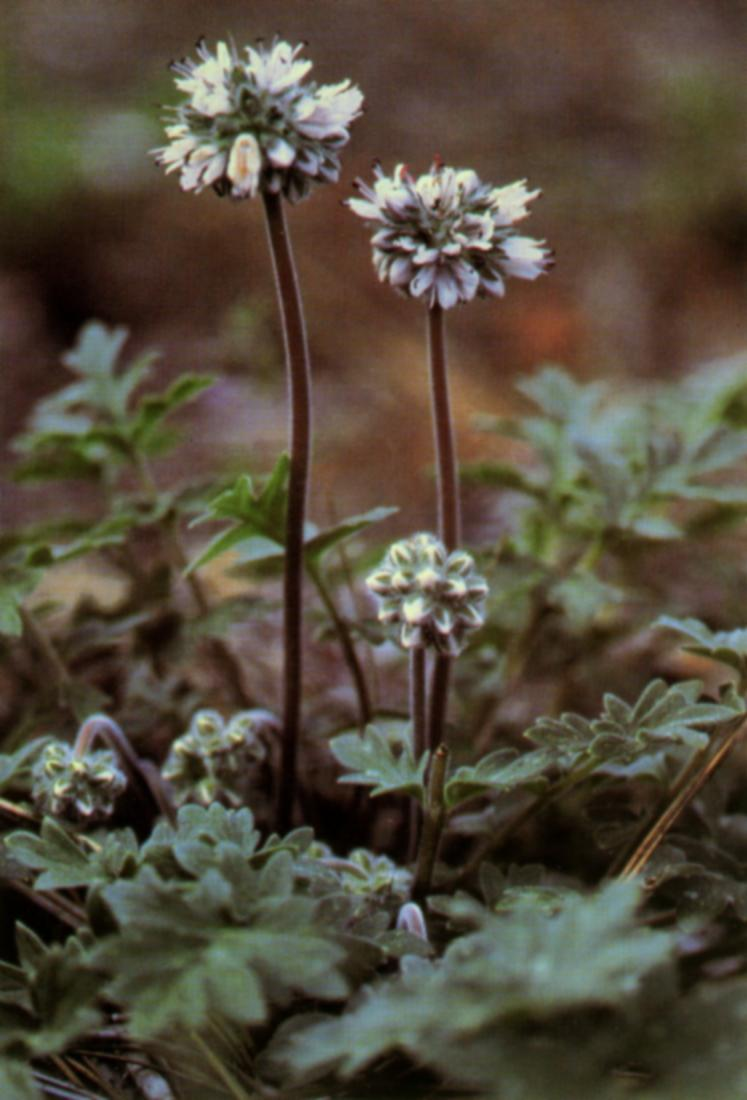
- Hydrophyllum occidentale

Scientific classification
- Kingdom: Plantae
- Clade: Tracheophytes
- Clade: Angiosperms
- Clade: Eudicots
- Clade: Asterids
- Order: Boraginales
- Family: Hydrophyllaceae
- Genus: Hydrophyllum; L. (1753)

Species
- 10, see text

Synonyms
- Decemium Raf. (1817)

= Hydrophyllum =

Genus of flowering plants

Hydrophyllum is a genus of herbaceous perennial plants in the family Hydrophyllaceae. It consists of ten species, all of which are native to North America.

All Hydrophyllum are found in areas of mesic or moist soil.

== Species ==
Ten species are accepted.

- Hydrophyllum alpestre A.Nelson & P.B.Kenn.
- Hydrophyllum appendiculatum Michx. -- Great waterleaf
- Hydrophyllum brownei Kral & Bates -- Browne's waterleaf
- Hydrophyllum canadense L. -- Blunt-leaf waterleaf, bluntleaf waterleaf
- Hydrophyllum capitatum Dougl. ex Benth. -- Ballhead waterleaf
- Hydrophyllum fendleri (Gray) Heller -- Fendler's waterleaf
- Hydrophyllum macrophyllum Nutt. -- Largeleaf waterleaf
- Hydrophyllum occidentale (S. Wats.) Gray -- Western waterleaf
- Hydrophyllum tenuipes Heller -- Pacific waterleaf
- Hydrophyllum virginianum L. -- Virginia waterleaf, Shawnee salad
