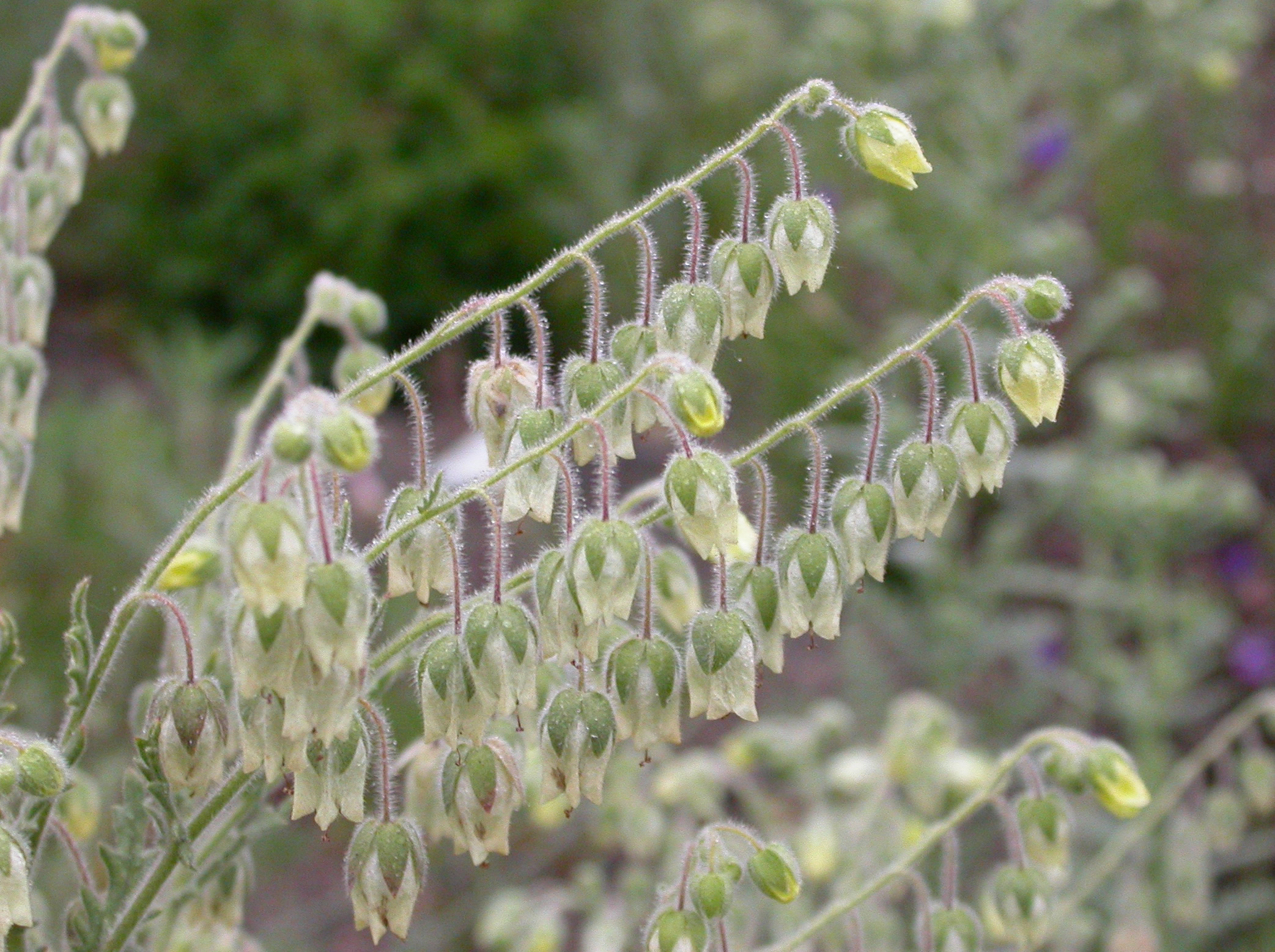

Scientific classification
- Kingdom: Plantae
- Clade: Tracheophytes
- Clade: Angiosperms
- Clade: Eudicots
- Clade: Asterids
- Order: Boraginales
- Family: Hydrophyllaceae
- Genus: Emmenanthe; Benth.

Species
- Emmenanthe penduliflora Benth.; Emmenanthe rosea (Brand) Constance

= Emmenanthe =

Genus of flowering plants

Emmenanthe is a genus of flowering plants in the family Hydrophyllaceae. It includes two species native to western North America.

- Emmenanthe penduliflora Benth.
- Emmenanthe rosea (Brand) Constance
