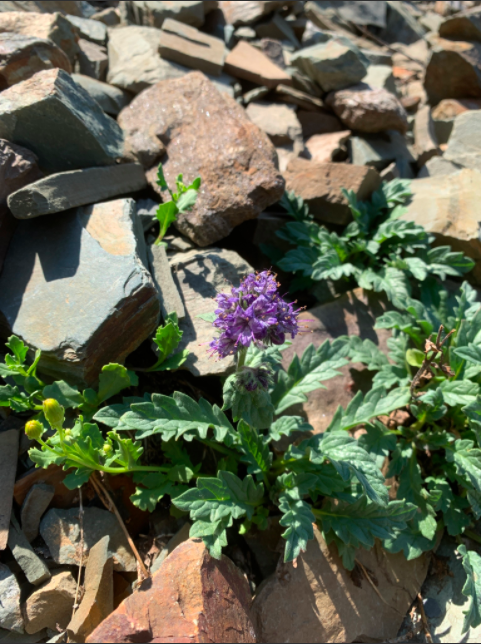
- On scree in Waterton Lakes National Park, Alberta

Scientific classification
- Kingdom: Plantae
- Clade: Tracheophytes
- Clade: Angiosperms
- Clade: Eudicots
- Clade: Asterids
- Order: Boraginales
- Family: Hydrophyllaceae
- Genus: Phacelia
- Species: P. lyallii

Binomial name
- Phacelia lyallii (Gray) Rydb.

= Phacelia lyallii =

Lyall's phacelia

Species in the Borage family

Phacelia lyallii, common name Lyall's phacelia, is a species of plant in the family Hydrophyllaceae.

== Habitat ==
Phacelia lyallii is native to the central Rocky Mountains of North America. Its distribution covers western Montana, southwestern Alberta (Waterton Lakes National Park), central Idaho (Lemhi County), and extreme southeastern British Columbia (Akamina-Kishinena Provincial Park. It is restricted to scree slopes and crevices on quartzite substrates in alpine areas, often in areas with abundant snowmelt.

== Ecology ==
Phacelia lyalii is known to be pollinated by several Bombus species. It closely resembles Phacelia sericea with which it co-occurs, but can be distinguished by its relatively shallowly-cleft, pinnately-lobed leaves.

== Threats ==
Phacelia lyallii populations are separated by large areas of unsuitable habitat. They are also expected to have poor dispersal ability. This, along with their high-elevation niche and dependence on summer snowmelt, puts P. lyallii at a high risk of extinction from climate change. Within the southern portion of its range P. lyallii is vulnerable to disturbance from mining. From Glacier National Park and northward, P. lyallii is confined to protected areas.

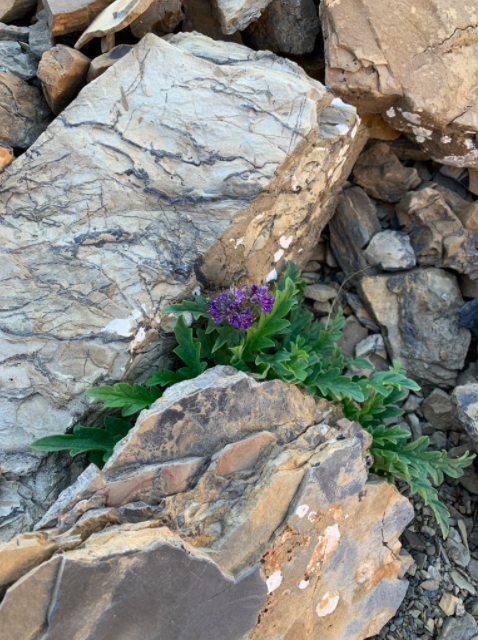
Phacelia lyallii

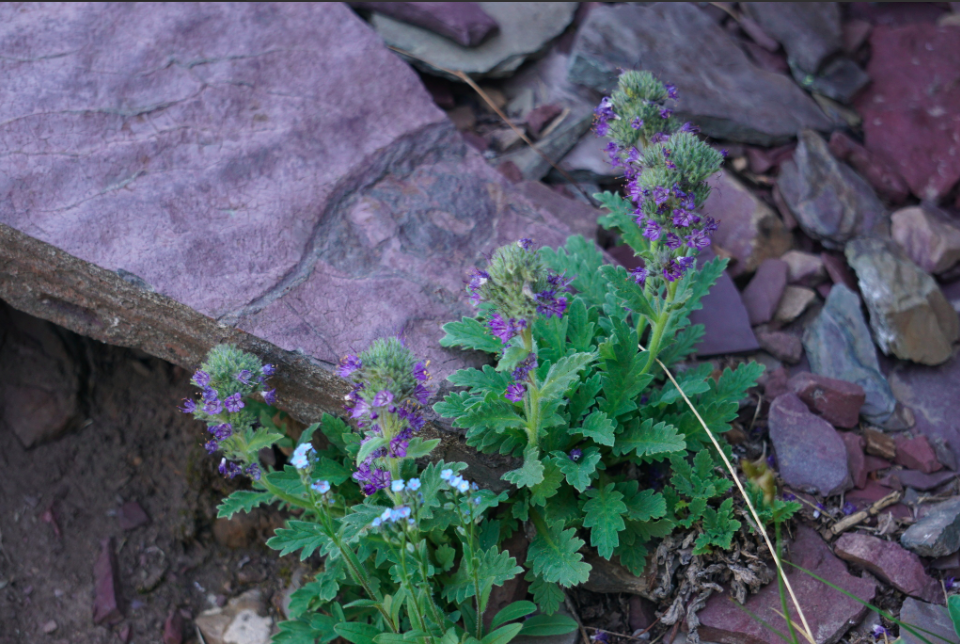
Phacelia lyallii

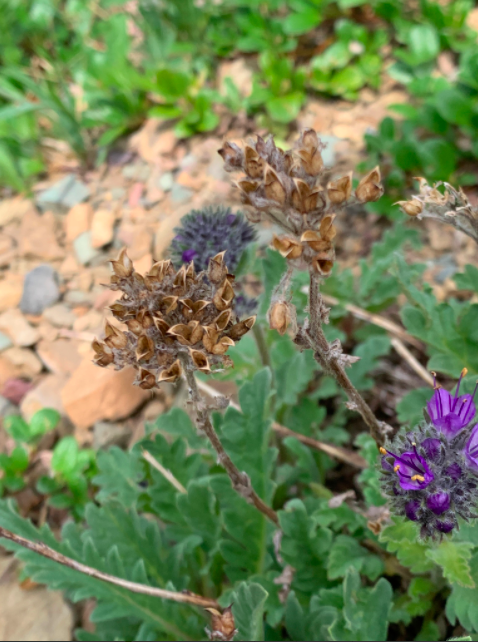
Old inflorescence of Phacelia lyallii

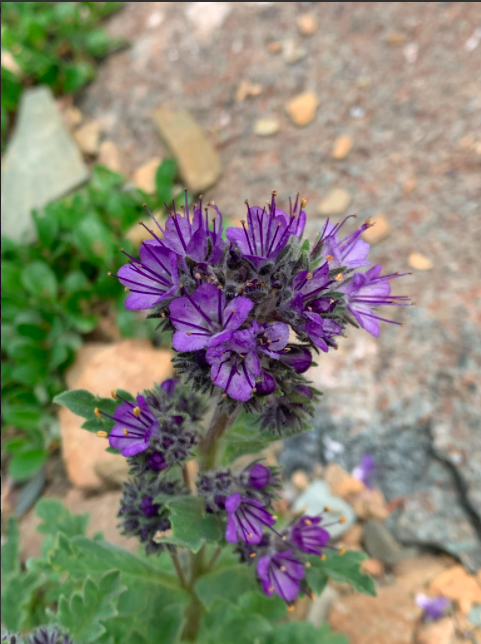
Phacelia lyallii inflorescence
