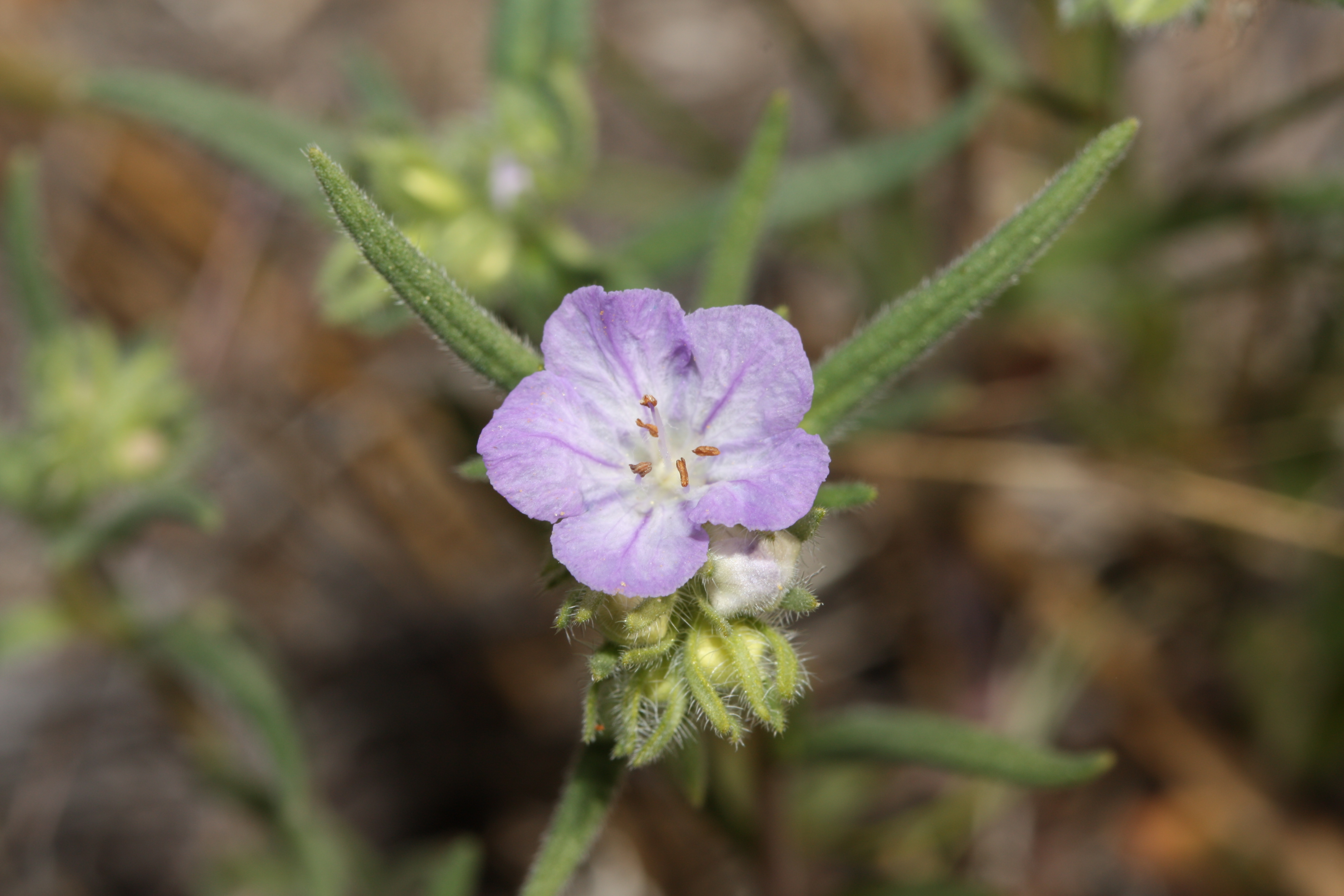

Scientific classification
- Kingdom: Plantae
- Clade: Tracheophytes
- Clade: Angiosperms
- Clade: Eudicots
- Clade: Asterids
- Order: Boraginales
- Family: Hydrophyllaceae
- Genus: Phacelia
- Species: P. linearis

Binomial name
- Phacelia linearis (Pursh) Holz.

= Phacelia linearis =

Species of plant

Phacelia linearis, the linear-leaved phacelia or threadleaf phacelia, is a species of phacelia.

== Description ==
Phacelia linearis is an annual herb producing a branching or unbranched erect stem up to 60 centimeters (24 in) tall. It is coated in soft or stiff hairs. The leaves are linear or lance-shaped and sometimes divided into several narrow, pointed lobes. The hairy inflorescence is a one-sided curving or coiling cyme of bell-shaped flowers. Each flower is up to 1 cm long and light purple in color with fused petals forming a paler tubular throat; they have five stamens. Flowers bloom April to June.

== Range and habitat ==
Phacelia linearis is native to western North America from western Canada to Wyoming to northern California, where it grows in open forest, juniper woodland, open scrub, and similar habitats, usually in sandy or rocky soils in dry areas.
