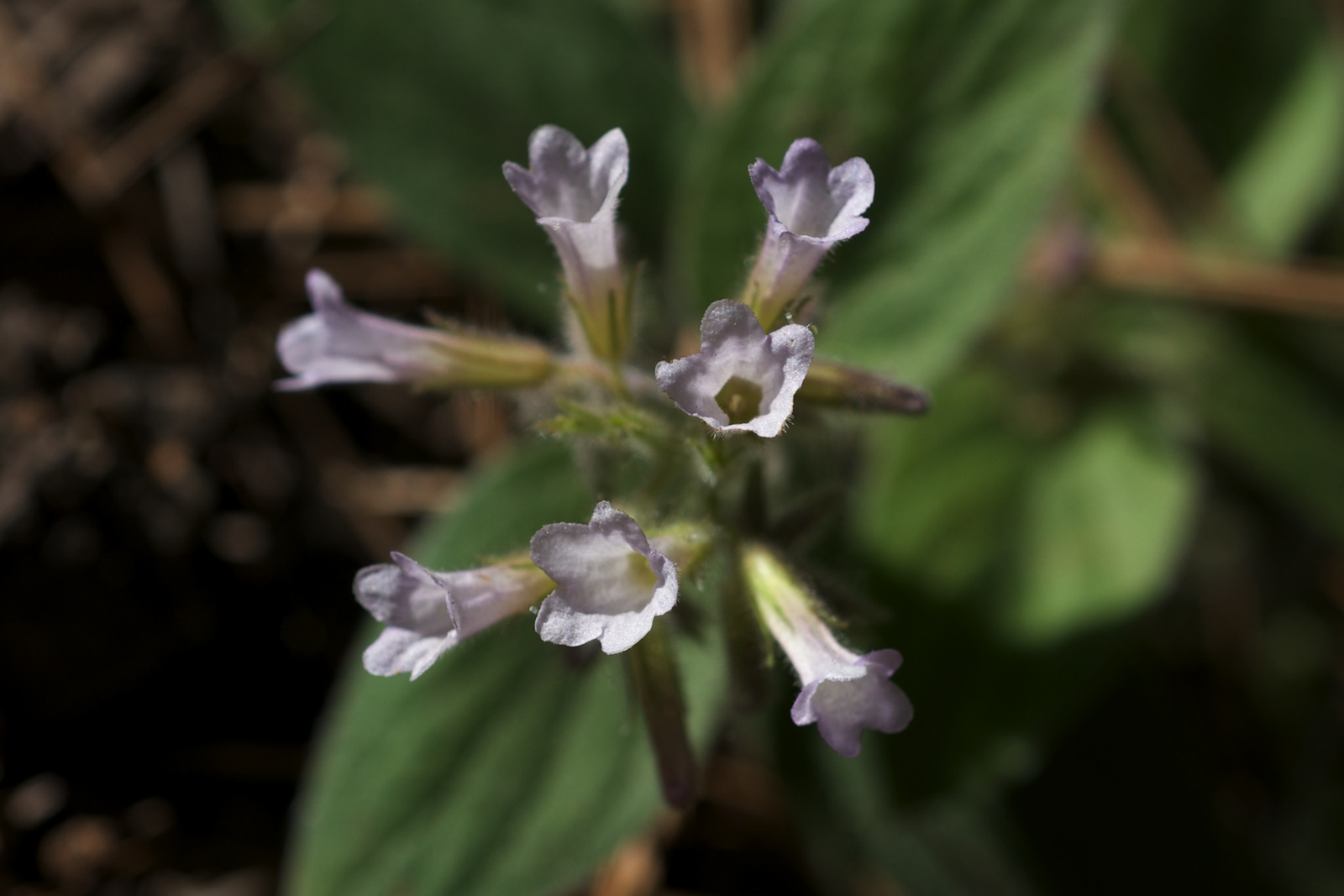

Conservation status
- Vulnerable (NatureServe)

Scientific classification
- Kingdom: Plantae
- Clade: Tracheophytes
- Clade: Angiosperms
- Clade: Eudicots
- Clade: Asterids
- Order: Boraginales
- Family: Hydrophyllaceae
- Genus: Draperia; Torr.
- Species: D. systyla

Binomial name
- Draperia systyla Torr.

= Draperia =

Genus of plants

Draperia is a monotypic genus of plants in the family Hydrophyllaceae, which includes the single species Draperia systyla, known by the common name violet draperia. This small perennial wildflower is endemic to California, where it grows in woodlands and rocky slopes in high mountains. Its leaves, flowers, and fruits are hairy. The flowers are funnel-shaped and generally light pink to lavender in color.
