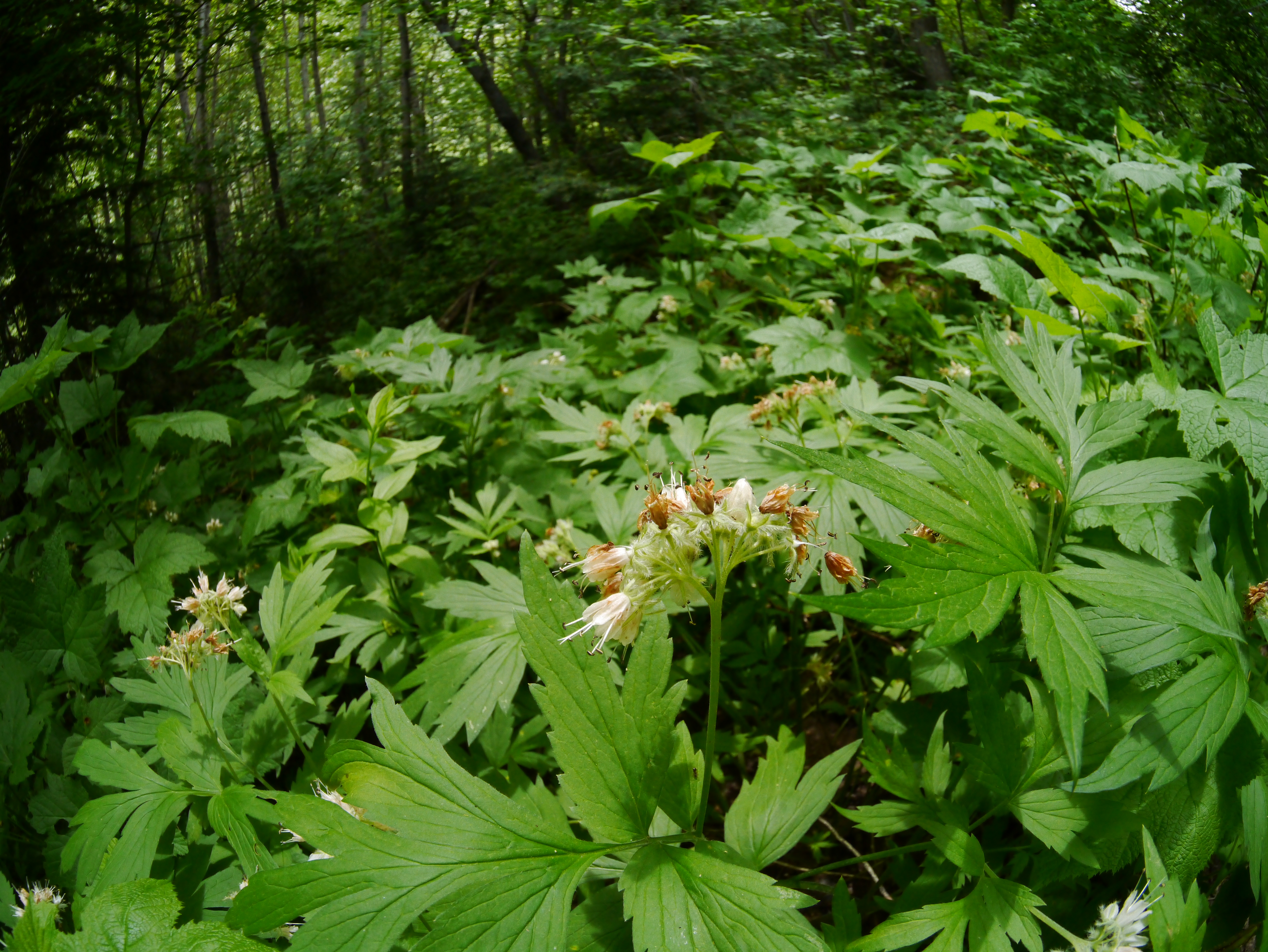

Conservation status
- Secure (NatureServe)

Scientific classification
- Kingdom: Plantae
- Clade: Tracheophytes
- Clade: Angiosperms
- Clade: Eudicots
- Clade: Asterids
- Order: Boraginales
- Family: Hydrophyllaceae
- Genus: Hydrophyllum
- Species: H. fendleri

Binomial name
- Hydrophyllum fendleri (A.Gray) A.Heller

= Hydrophyllum fendleri =

Species of flowering plant

Hydrophyllum fendleri, commonly known as Fendler's waterleaf, is a species of flowering plant in the Hydrophyllaceae family. Its range is from Washington to California, verging into eastern Idaho. Its specific name honors Augustus Fendler who collected samples for Asa Gray.
