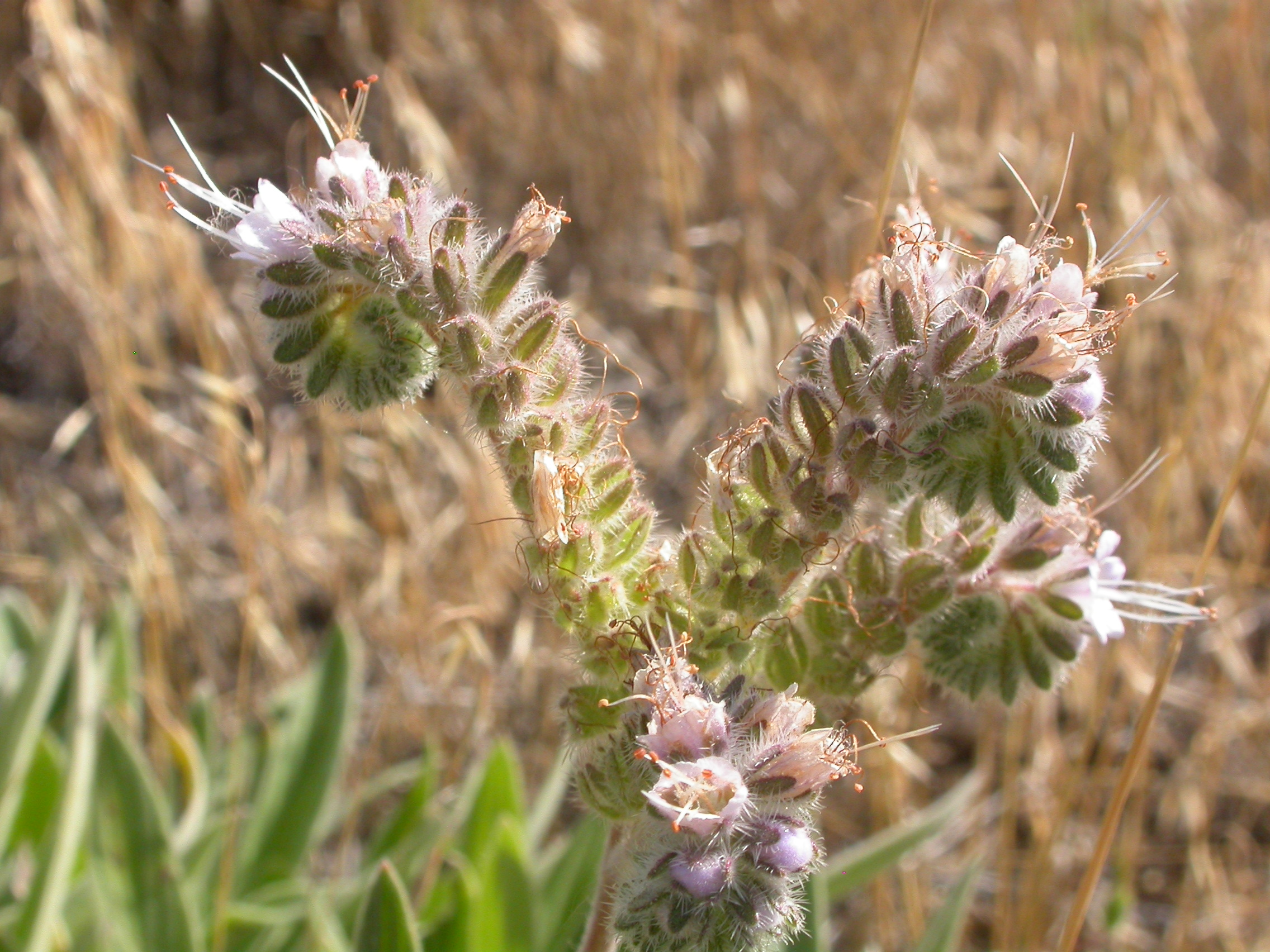

Conservation status
- Secure (NatureServe)

Scientific classification
- Kingdom: Plantae
- Clade: Tracheophytes
- Clade: Angiosperms
- Clade: Eudicots
- Clade: Asterids
- Order: Boraginales
- Family: Hydrophyllaceae
- Genus: Phacelia
- Species: P. hastata

Binomial name
- Phacelia hastata Douglas ex Lehm.

Synonyms
- Phacelia alpina Phacelia frigida Phacelia leucophylla

= Phacelia hastata =

Species of plant

Phacelia hastata is a species of flowering plant in the family Hydrophyllaceae. Its common names include silverleaf scorpionweed, silverleaf phacelia, and white-leaf phacelia. It is native to western North America from British Columbia and Alberta south to California and east to Nebraska. It can be found in many types of habitat, including scrub, woodland, and forest, up to an elevation of 13,000 feet. It prefers sandy to rocky soil.

== Description ==
Phacelia hastata is a variable perennial herb with a stem 5 to 92 centimeters (2 to 36 in) long. It is coated in a fine, silvery pubescence. The deeply veined, gray-green leaves are lance-shaped to oval, and smooth-edged, lobed, or divided into leaflets. Most of the leaves are in a tuft around the base of the plant. The flowers are arranged in cymes, blooming in early summer. They have an urn- or bell-shaped white or lavender fused corolla about 4 to 7 millimeters long. The stamens protrude. The fruit is a hairy capsule a few millimeters in length.

There are up to four accepted varieties:

- P. hastata var. charlestonensis – Charleston phacelia, Spring Mountains phacelia; endemic to Nevada
- P. hastata var. compacta – compact phacelia, timberline phacelia; a matlike form occurring at elevation
- P. hastata var. dasyphylla – spearshaped phacelia; limited to California and Oregon
- P. hastata var. hastata – silverleaf phacelia; rangewide

== Gallery ==
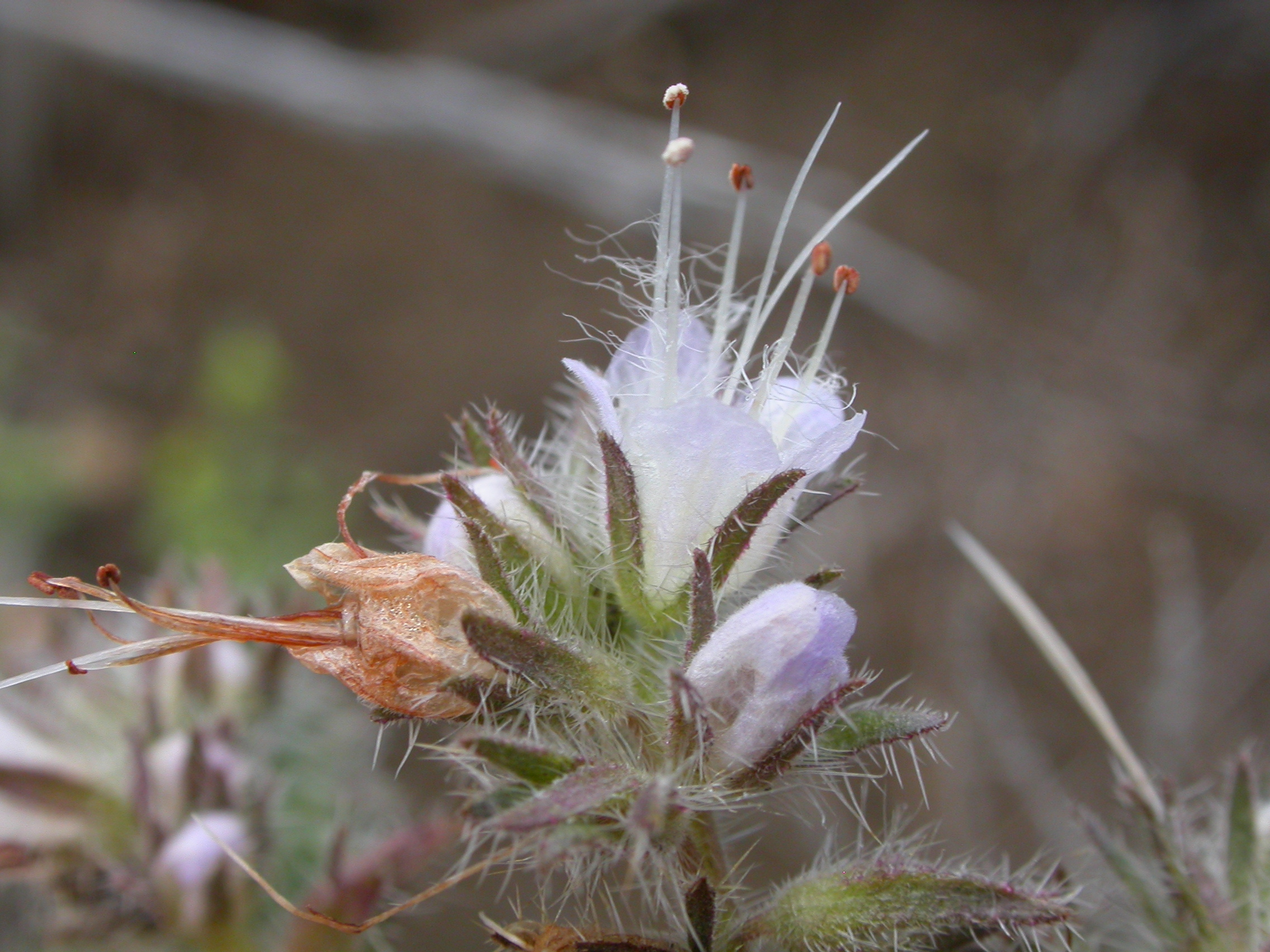
Flower

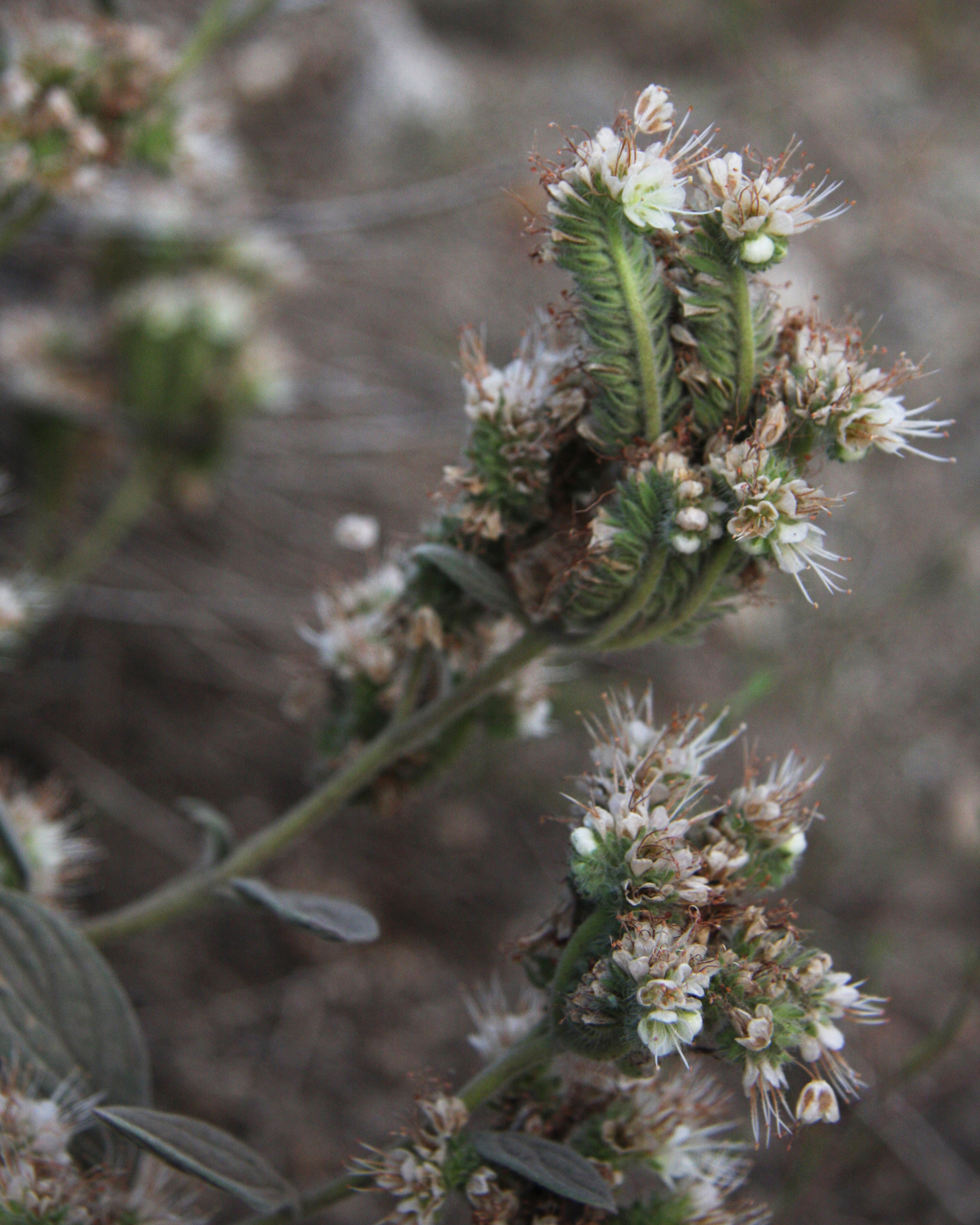
scorpioid flowerheads

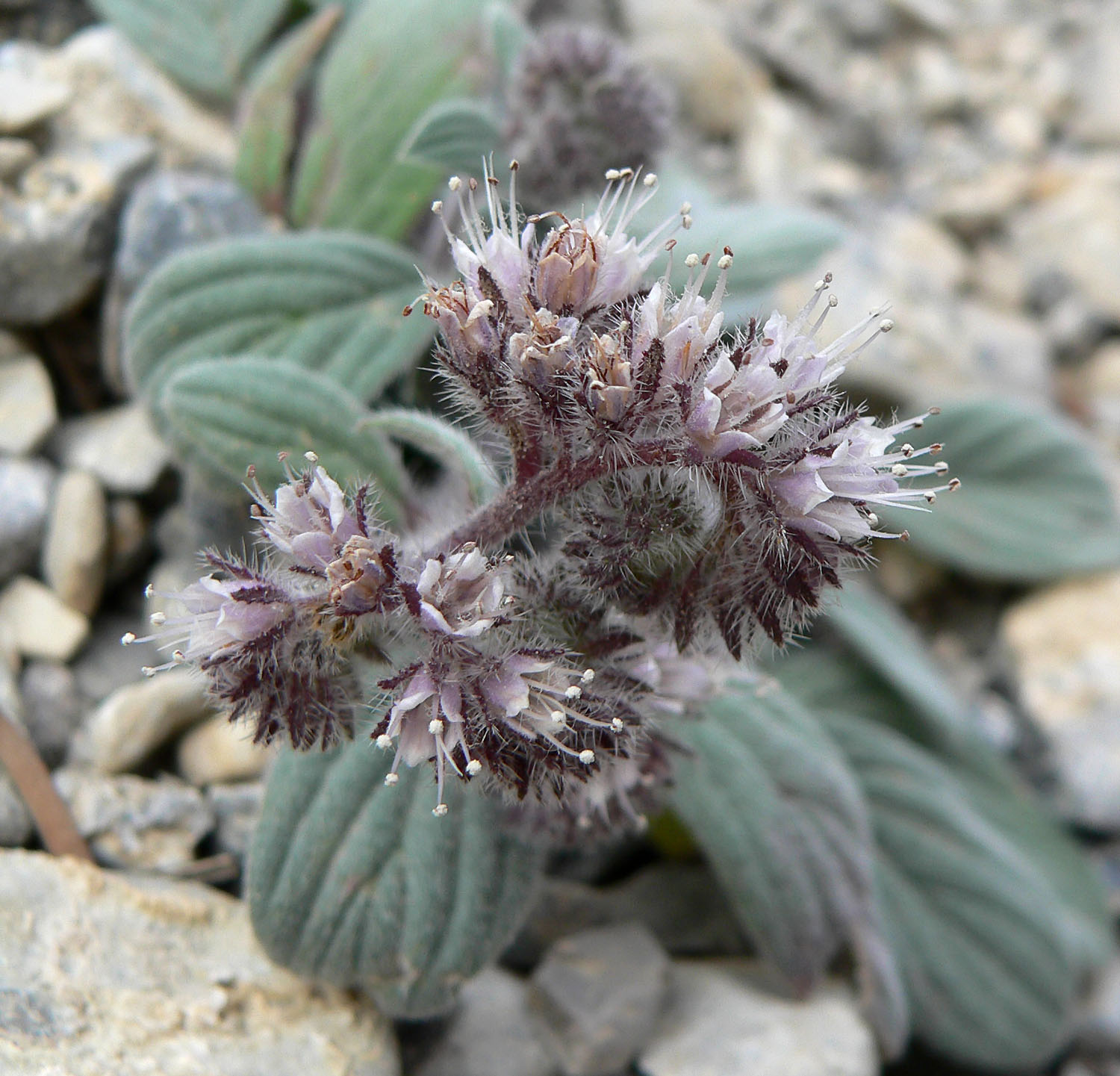
var. charlestonensis

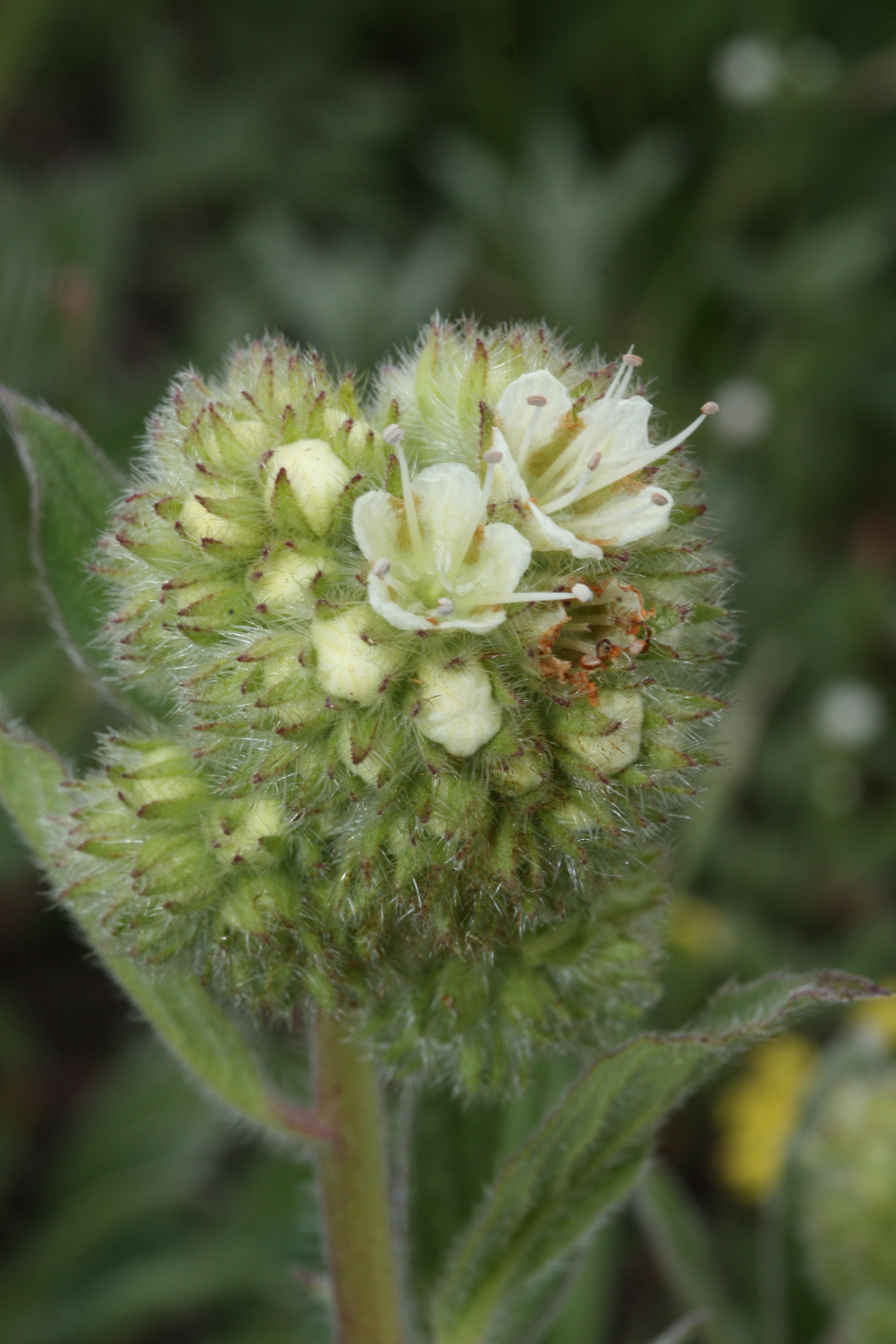
var. compacta

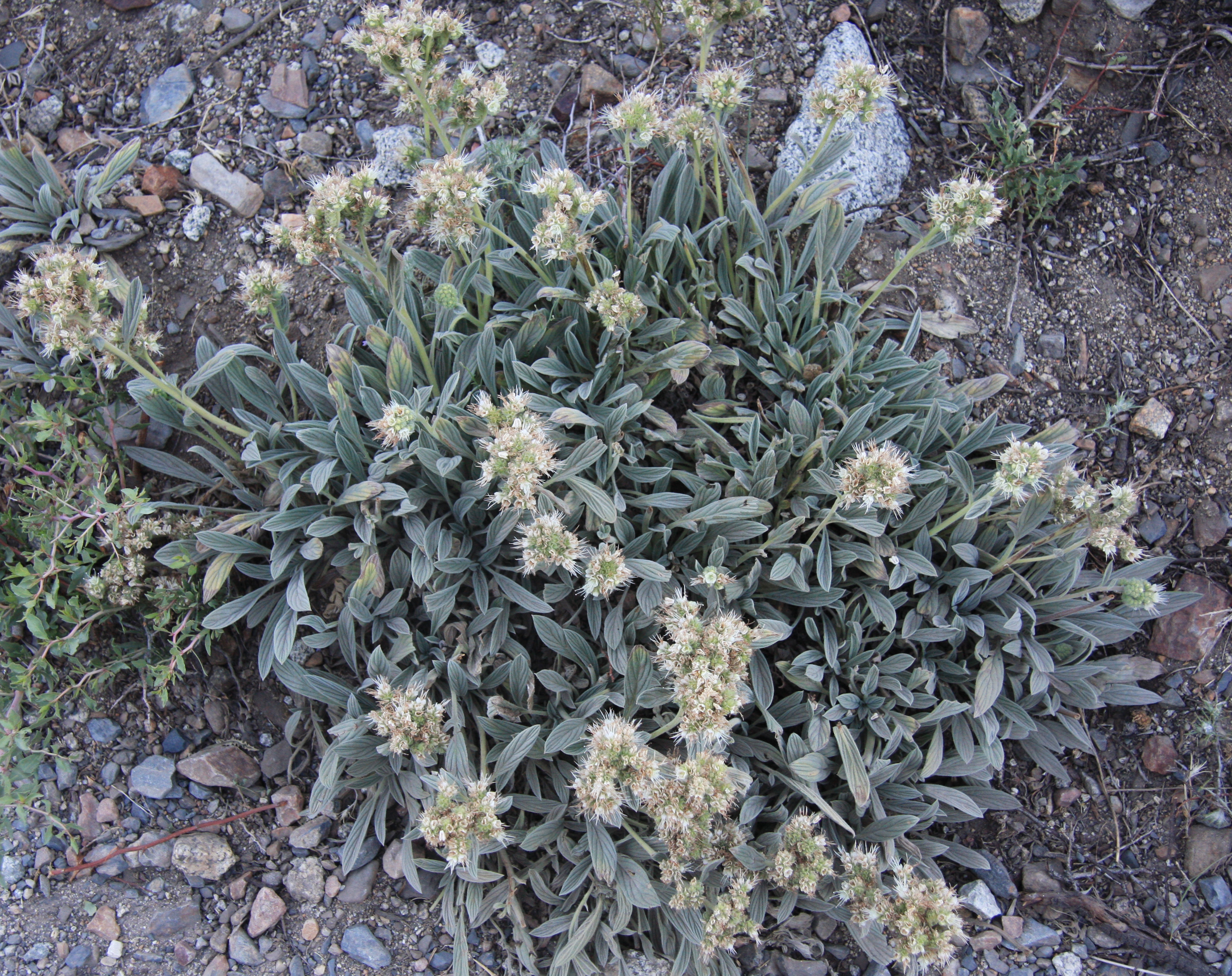
var compact large plant
