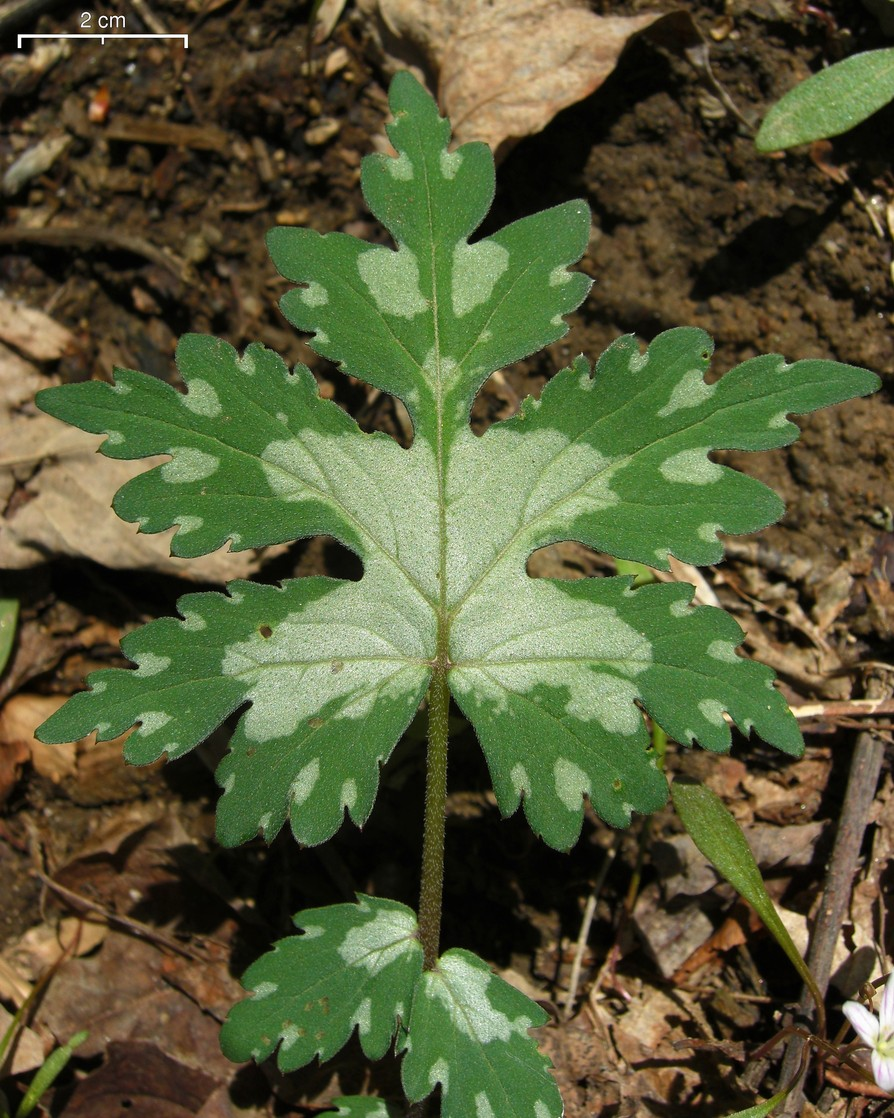

Scientific classification
- Kingdom: Plantae
- Clade: Tracheophytes
- Clade: Angiosperms
- Clade: Eudicots
- Clade: Asterids
- Order: Boraginales
- Family: Hydrophyllaceae
- Genus: Hydrophyllum
- Species: H. canadense

Binomial name
- Hydrophyllum canadense L.

Synonyms
- Hydrophyllum acerifolium Salisb.; Hydrophyllum lobatum Stokes

= Hydrophyllum canadense =

Species of flowering plant

Hydrophyllum canadense, known as bluntleaf waterleaf, broadleaf waterleaf, or Canada waterleaf, is native to the eastern United States and Canada. The genus Hydrophyllum is placed in the family Hydrophyllaceae.

Hydrophyllum canadense is one of ten species of Hydrophyllum, a genus endemic to North America. It can be distinguished from other Hydrophyllum species across its range by a combination of the following features: perennial, stem leaves palmately lobed, sepals lacking appendages (or less than 0.5 mm in length), and stamens exserted 3–6 mm.

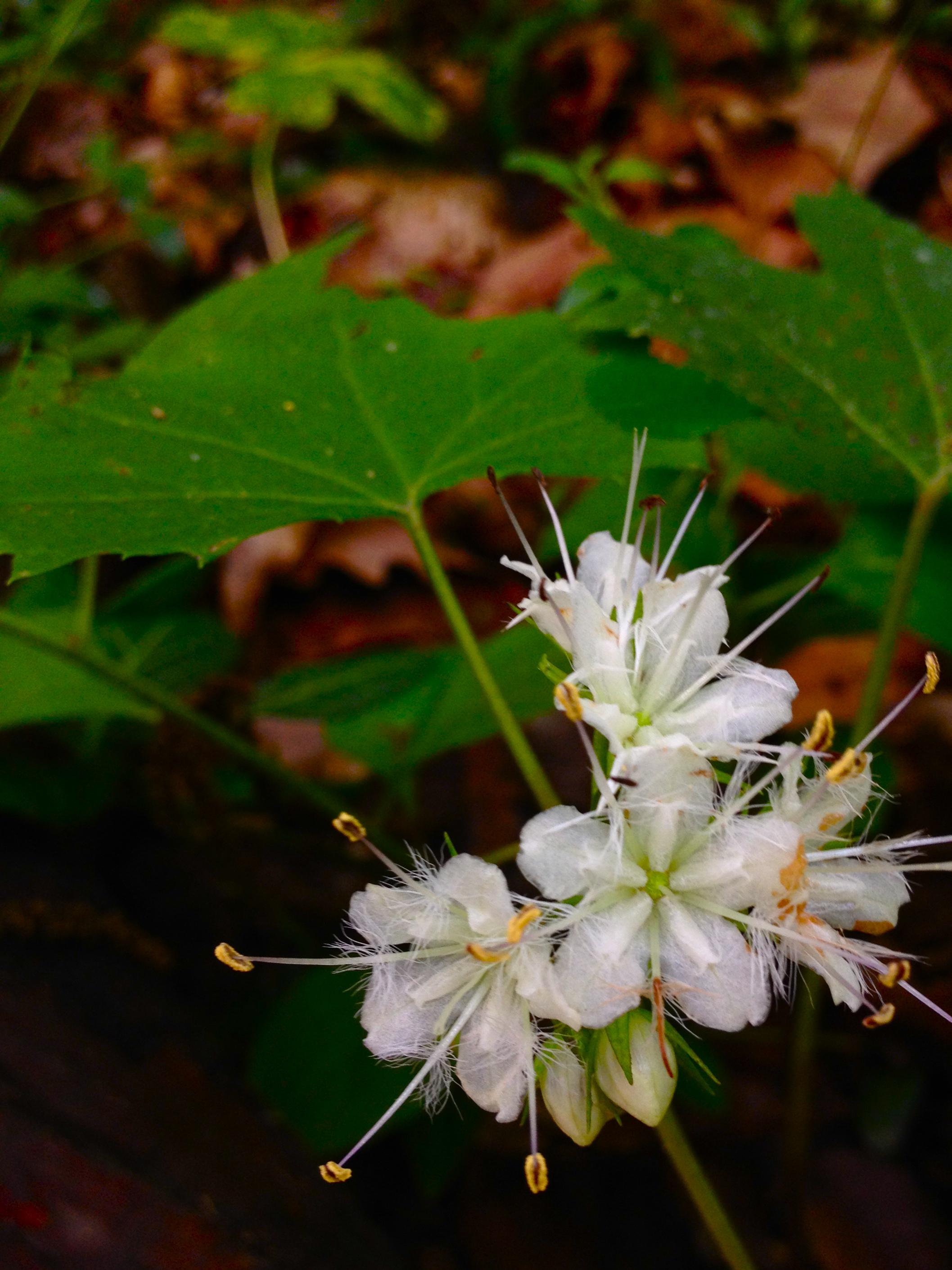
In flower in Maryland
