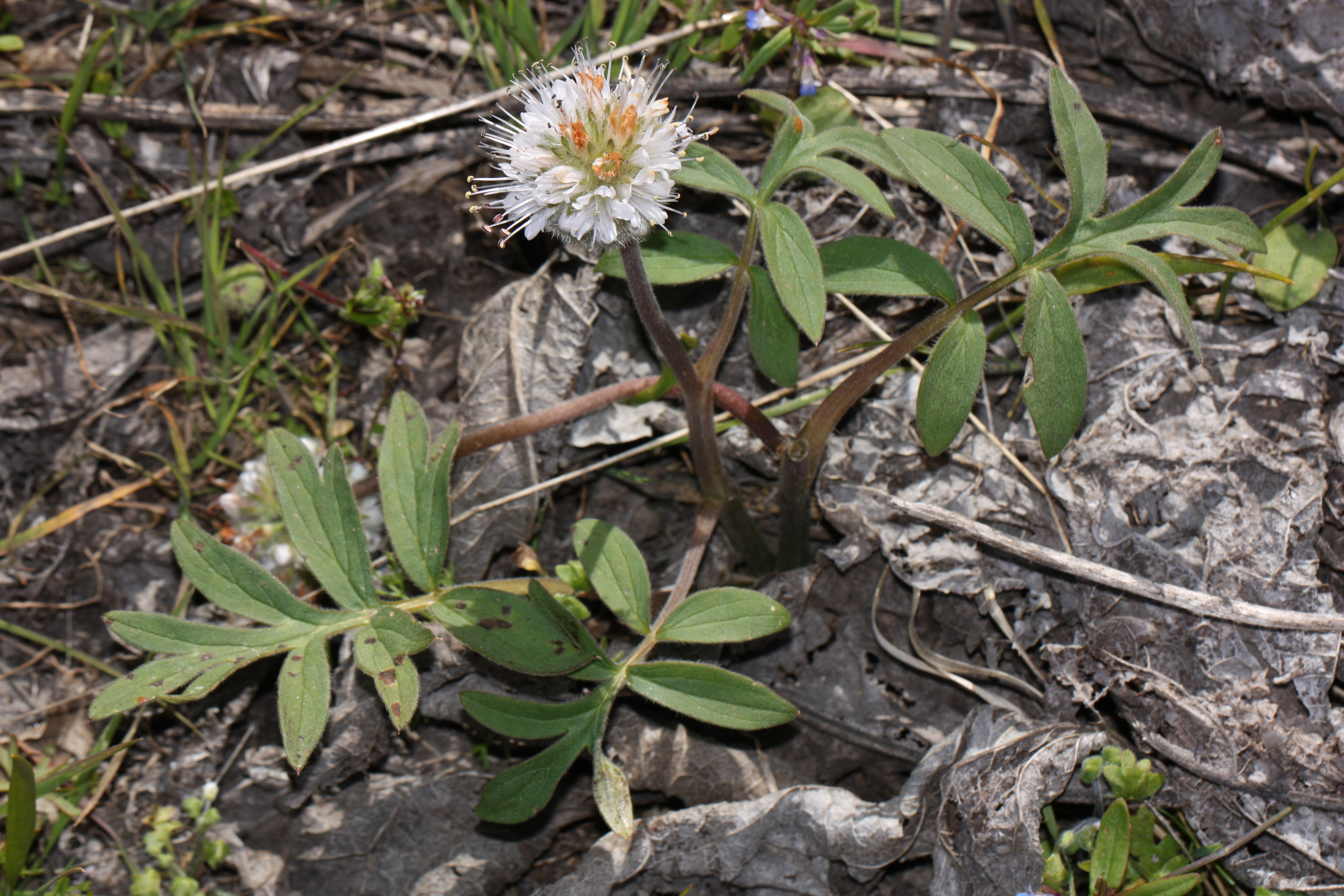
- Hydrophyllum capitatum var. thompsonii (Tom McCall Preserve, Oregon)

Conservation status
- Secure (NatureServe)

Scientific classification
- Kingdom: Plantae
- Clade: Tracheophytes
- Clade: Angiosperms
- Clade: Eudicots
- Clade: Asterids
- Order: Boraginales
- Family: Boraginaceae
- Genus: Hydrophyllum
- Species: H. capitatum

Binomial name
- Hydrophyllum capitatum Douglas ex Benth.

Varieties
- H. capitatum var. capitatum; H. capitatum var. thompsonii

= Hydrophyllum capitatum =

Plant species in the borage family

Hydrophyllum capitatum, is a species of waterleaf known by the common name ballhead waterleaf. It is native to Western North America from British Columbia to Utah.

== Description ==
Individuals of this species are 10–40 centimeters (4–15 1/2 in) tall, hairy, erect herbs with solitary or few stems that are attached to fibrous roots running 25 cm (10 in) deep. The leaves are green and alternately arranged into 7 to 11 pinnately divided entire leaflets. The blades of the leaves are about 10 cm wide and 15 cm long. The flowers feature partial dichotomous branching and lay closer to the ground below the leaves (Hydrophyllum capitatum var. capitatum). However, a dwarf form of this plant occurs in northern Oregon and southern Washington where the flower heads are on long stalks above the leaves (Hydrophyllum capitatum var. thompsonii).

Flowers of Hydrophyllum capitatum, has whitish to purplish blue-coiled 5 to 9 cm bell-shaped corollas. Each flower also has 5 hairy calyx lobes. There are 5 long stamens per flower with anthers 0.6 to 1.3 millimeters long. The flowers bloom from March to July and obtain their purple color during this season. The fruit of the ballhead waterleaf are capsules with 1 to 3 seeds each.

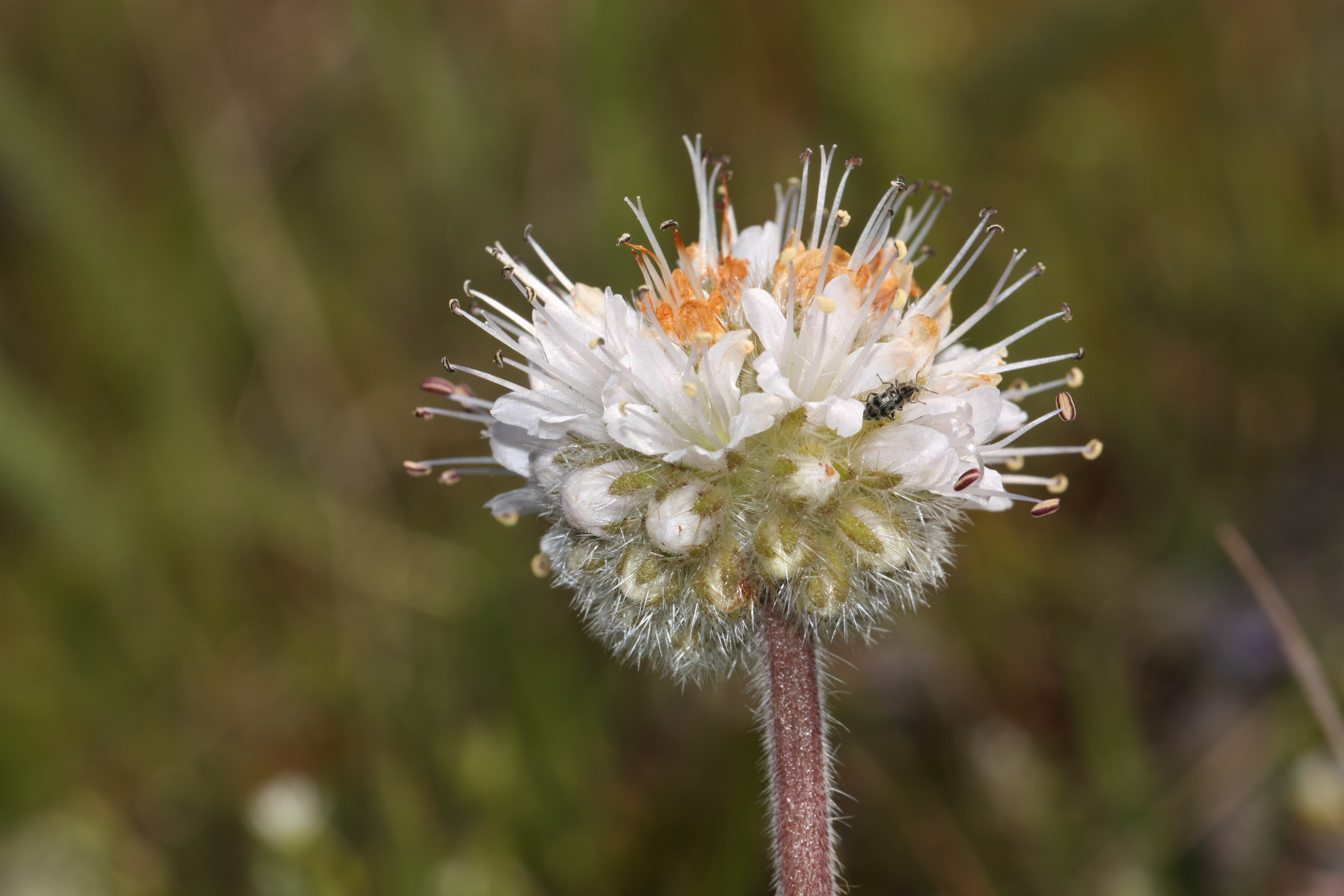
The white to blue flowers, borne in a tight spherical cluster, have five hairy calyx lobes and five exerted stamens.

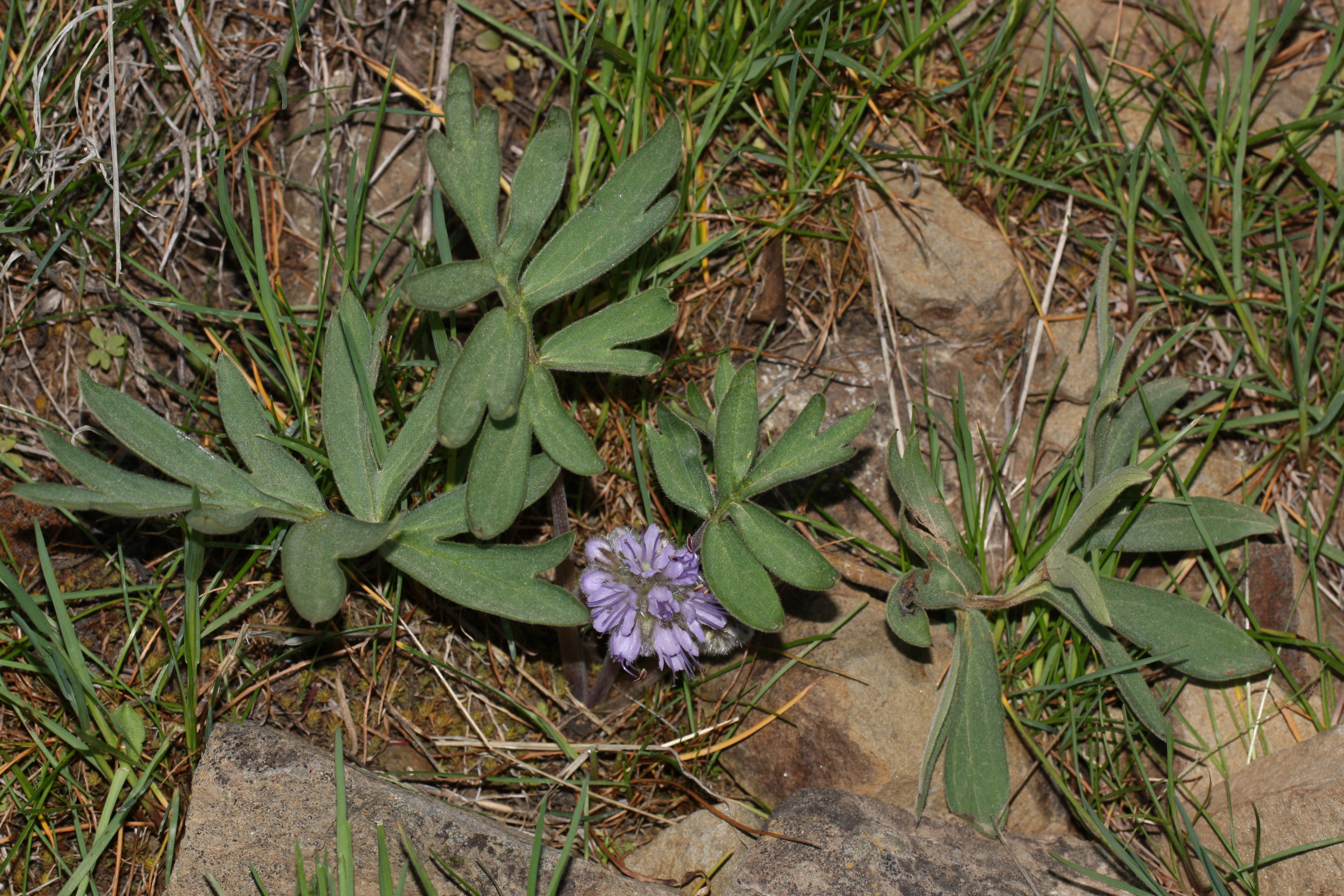
Hydrophyllum capitatum var. capitatum (Wenas Wildlife Area, Washington)

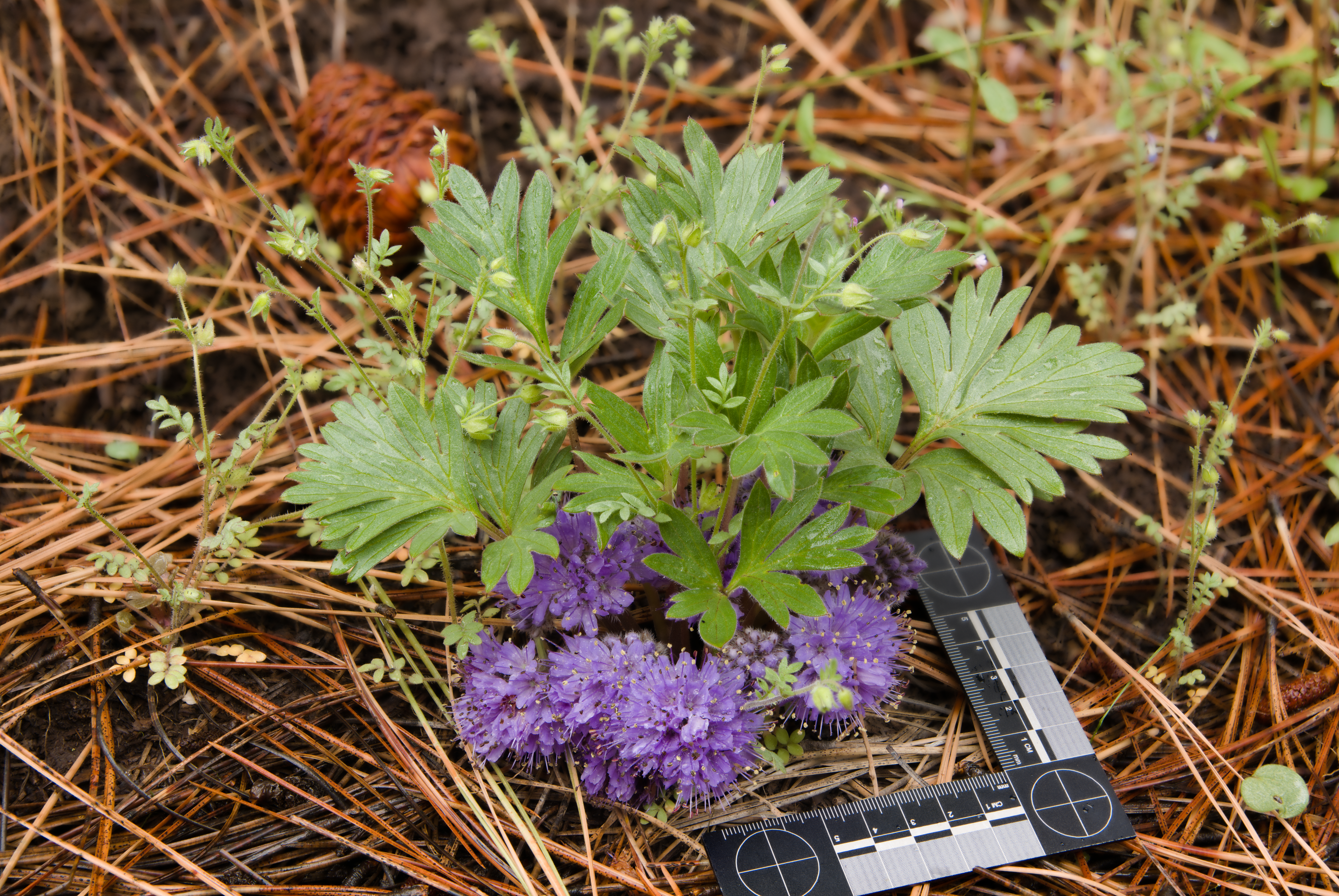
Hydrophyllum capitatum var. alpinum (Ochoco National Forest, Oregon)

== Distribution and habitat ==
Hydrophyllum capitatum naturally occurs in Alberta and British Columbia in Canada, as well as the western region of the United States (California, Colorado, Idaho, Montana, Nevada, Oregon, Utah, Washington and Wyoming).

Hydrophyllum capitatum grows in areas that are rather barren and dry (though seasonally moist) to shady environments in fine or medium textured soil. This plant tends to grow in open woodlands and slopes, ranging from high plains to subalpine meadows. It is salinity intolerant and lives in an environment that ranges in pH from 6.4 to 7.8. The ballhead waterleaf is a perennial plant adapted to a precipitation zone that ranges from 16 to 30 inches/yr and a minimum temperature of -28 Fahrenheit.

== Uses ==
Indigenous peoples and settlers cooked the leaves and the roots of plants belonging to the genus Hydrophyllum, which includes the ballhead waterleaf, for greens.
