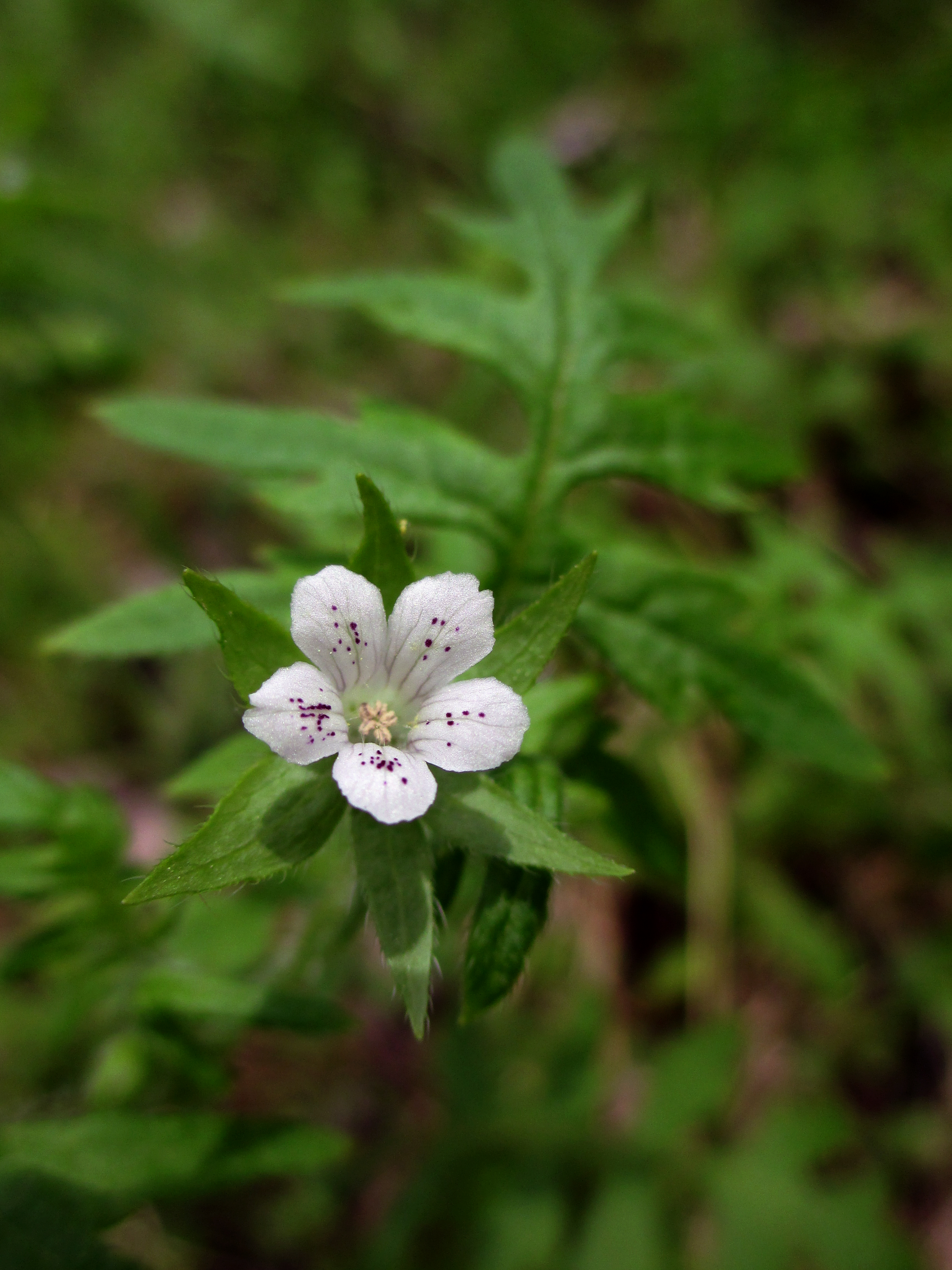

Conservation status
- Secure (NatureServe)

Scientific classification
- Kingdom: Plantae
- Clade: Tracheophytes
- Clade: Angiosperms
- Clade: Eudicots
- Clade: Asterids
- Order: Boraginales
- Family: Hydrophyllaceae
- Genus: Ellisia; L.
- Species: E. nyctelea

Binomial name
- Ellisia nyctelea (L.) L.

Synonyms
- Ipomoea nyctelea L. Nyctelea nyctelea (L.) Britton

= Ellisia =

Genus of flowering plants

Ellisia is a genus of flowering plants in the family Hydrophyllaceae, containing the sole species Ellisia nyctelea. It is native to North America, where it is also known as Aunt Lucy, false baby blue eyes, and waterpod. The genus was named in honor of British naturalist John Ellis, a contemporary of, and correspondent to, Carl Linnaeus. It was published and described by Linnaeus, in his book Species Plantarum ed.2 on page 1662 in 1763.

== Description ==
Ellisia nyctelea is an annual plant that grows to four to sixteen inches (10 to 41 cm) tall. Lower leaves are arranged oppositely on a somewhat succulent stem, while upper leaves are alternate. The hairy leaves are typically four inches (100 mm) long by one inch (25 mm) wide and are deeply lobed or divided, with seven to 13 lobes or leaflets on each leaf.

The small one-quarter-inch-diameter (6.4 mm) flowers are found on short slender stalks arising from the leaf axils. Each flower has five white or light blue petals that are united at the base to form a tube; these may be streaked or dotted with purple coloration. The calyx is hairy, green, and has five large teeth.

== Range and habitat ==
Ellisia nyctelea is widespread in North America, although it is largely absent from northern Canada, northern New England, the southeastern United States and the west coast of the United States. It is found both in disturbed, open habitats with bare soil, as well as in deciduous forests.
