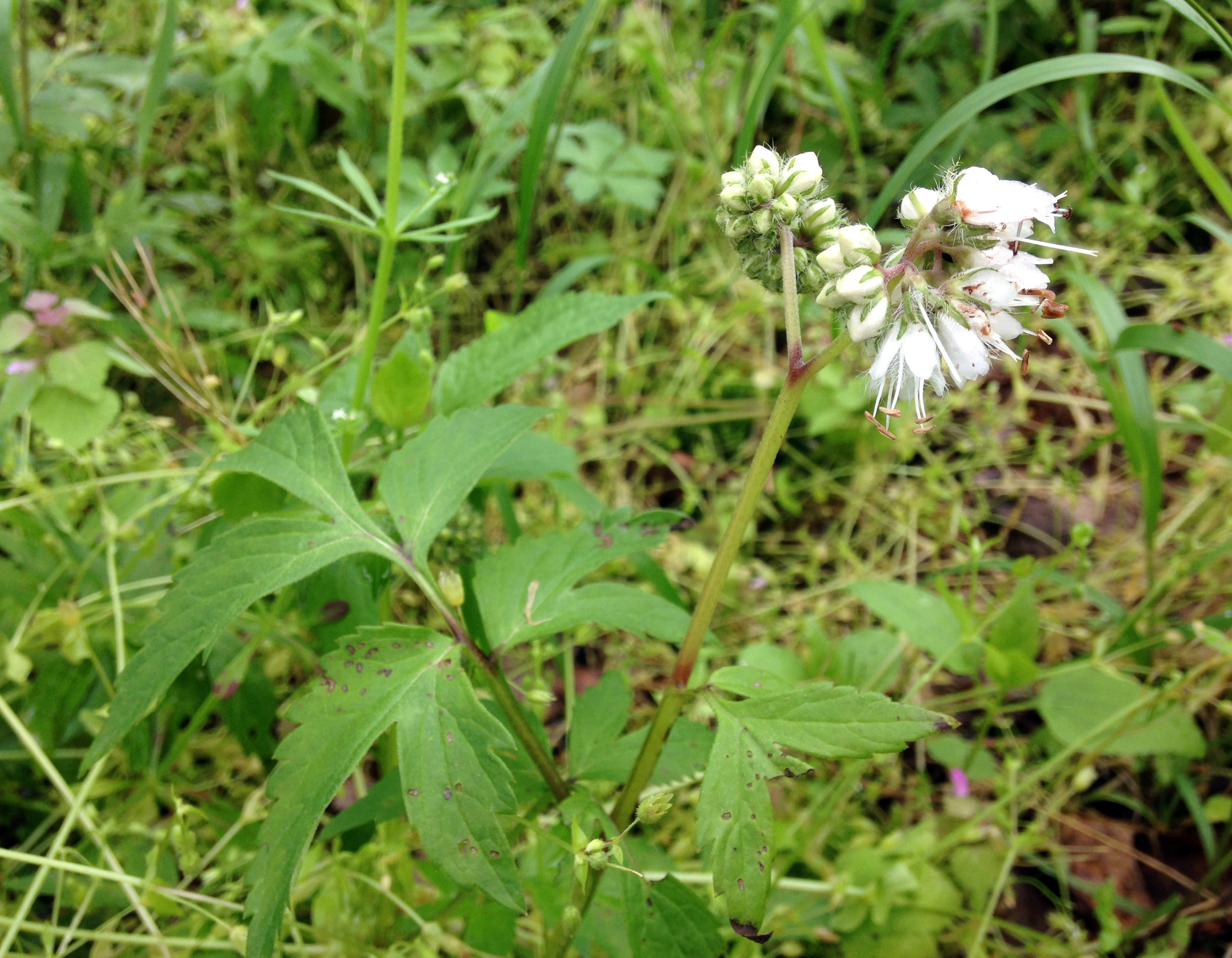

Scientific classification
- Kingdom: Plantae
- Clade: Tracheophytes
- Clade: Angiosperms
- Clade: Eudicots
- Clade: Asterids
- Order: Boraginales
- Family: Hydrophyllaceae
- Genus: Hydrophyllum
- Species: H. virginianum

Binomial name
- Hydrophyllum virginianum L.

= Hydrophyllum virginianum =

Species of flowering plant

Hydrophyllum virginianum, commonly called Virginia waterleaf or eastern waterleaf, is an herbaceous perennial plant native to Eastern North America where it is primarily found in the Midwest, Northeast, and Appalachian regions. The genus Hydrophyllum is placed in the family Hydrophyllaceae.

Its natural habitat is in bottomland forests, mesic upland forests, and rocky forested bluffs.

== Description ==
Hydrophyllum virginianum is an herbaceous perennial that spreads by rhizomes to form large colonies in wooded areas. It can also spread by seeds.

The seedling usually appear early to mid-spring. Flowers are blue, white, or purple, appearing in mid to late spring. Flowers exposed to sunlight bleach rapidly. Often the newer leaves are solid green with white spots appearing as they age and later disappearing in early summer.

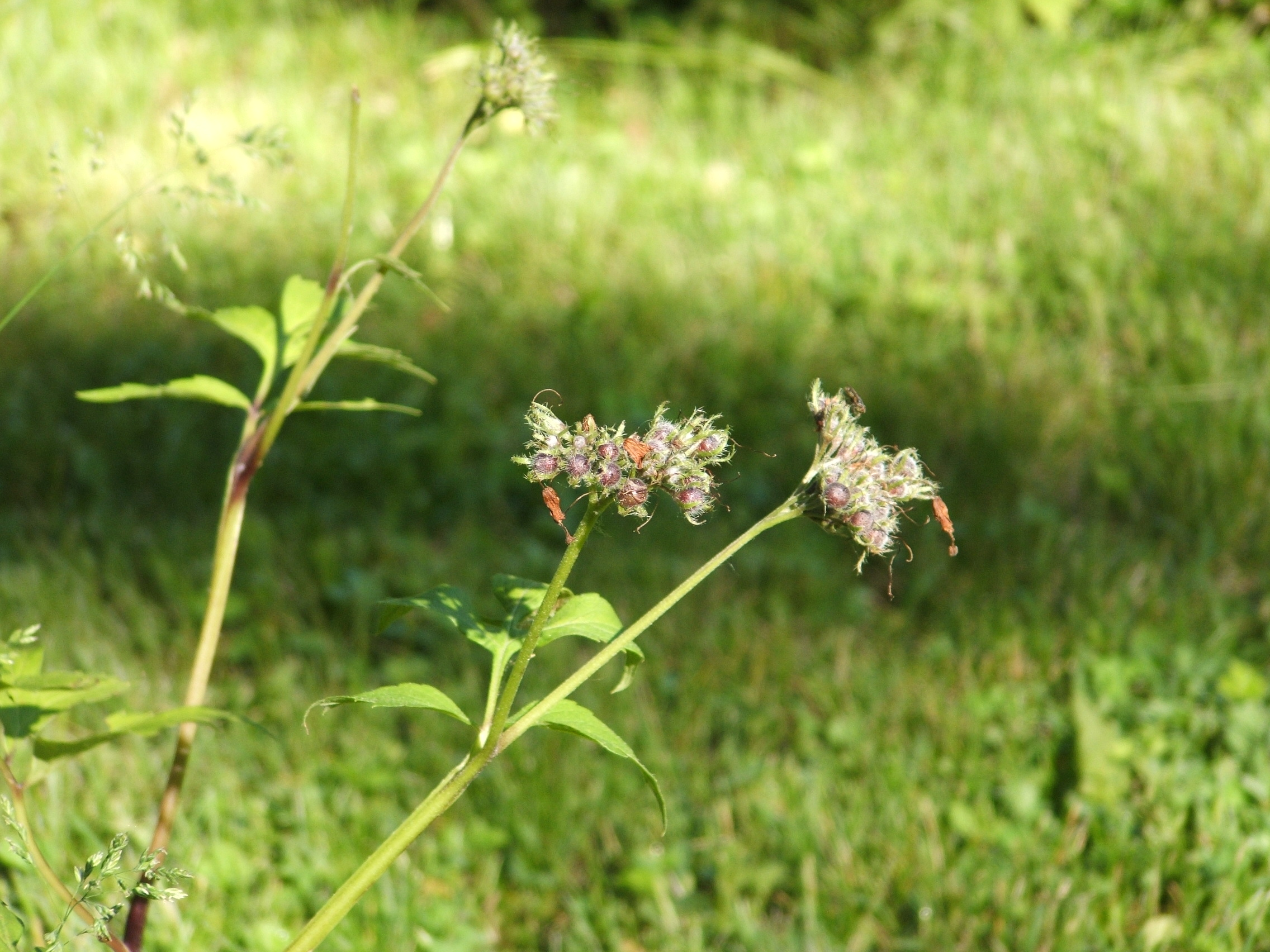
Ripening seed pods in early June in Iowa

== Taxonomy ==
Populations in the southern Appalachian Mountains have purple to maroon flowers and differ in a number of other characters. The taxonomic status of these entities has been debated, with the most traditional treatments recognizing them at the varietal rank as Hydrophyllum virginianum var. atranthum. However, specific status to these population (as Hydrophyllum atranthum) is given in the 2020 edition of Alan Weakley's Flora of the Southeastern United States.
