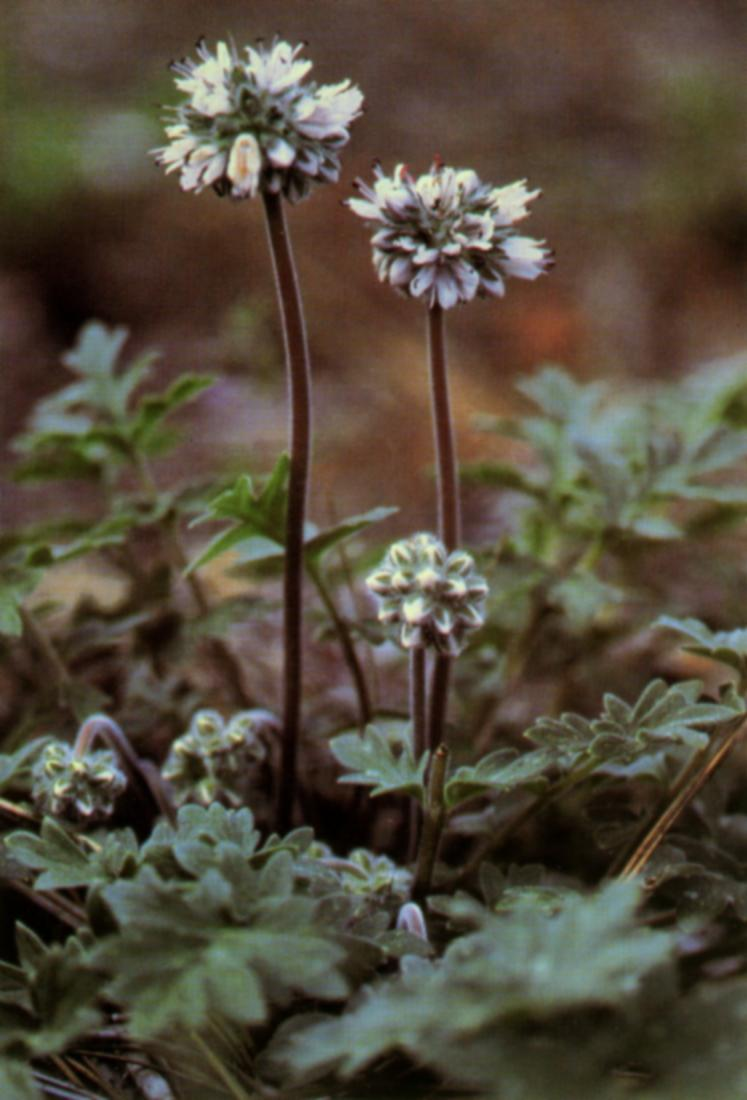
- Hydrophyllum occidentale

Scientific classification
- Kingdom: Plantae
- Clade: Tracheophytes
- Clade: Angiosperms
- Clade: Eudicots
- Clade: Asterids
- Order: Boraginales
- Family: Hydrophyllaceae; R.Br., nom. cons.

Genera
- See text.

= Hydrophyllaceae =

Family of flowering plants

Hydrophyllaceae is a family in the flowering plant order Boraginales. Its taxonomic position has varied; it has also been treated as the subfamily Hydrophylloideae of the family Boraginaceae sensu lato.

== Description ==
Plants in the family may be annual or perennial herbs or shrubs, with either a prostrate or an erect stem. Most have a taproot. The flowers are bisexual, and normally radial, with 5 petals and 5 stamens.

== Taxonomy ==
Traditionally, and under the Cronquist system, the taxon was given family rank under the name Hydrophyllaceae, and treated as part of the order Solanales. The family takes its name from the genus Hydrophyllum (waterleaf). Later systems recognised a close relationship to the borage family, Boraginaceae, initially by placing Hydrophyllaceae and Boraginaceae together in an order Boraginales. In the 2016 APG IV system, Hydrophyllaceae was included in Boraginaceae. Following the publication of APG IV, a collaborative group along similar lines to the Angiosperm Phylogeny Group, the Boraginales Working Group (BWG), published an alternative taxonomy based on the phylogenetic relationships within the Boraginaceae s.l. This classification split the order into eleven families, including Hydrophyllaceae, and as of December 2025 was accepted by many taxonomic sources, including World Flora Online and the Angiosperm Phylogeny Website.

=== Genera ===
As of December 2025, the World Flora Online accepted 11 genera:

- Draperia Torr.
- Ellisia L.
- Emmenanthe Benth.
- Eucrypta Nutt.
- Hesperochiron S.Wats.
- Hydrophyllum L.
- Nemophila Nutt.
- Phacelia Juss.
- Pholistoma Lilja
- Romanzoffia Cham.
- Tricardia Torr. ex S.Watson
