= Wildflowers of the Great Smoky Mountains =

Flowers in US national park (Tennessee, North Carolina)

The Great Smoky Mountains National Park is home to over 1,500 different species of flowering plants—more than any other North American national park, earning it the nickname of the "Wildflower National Park". Every spring in late April, Great Smoky Mountains National Park is the site of the week-long annual spring wildflower pilgrimage to celebrate this diversity. The park is also the site of the All Taxa Biodiversity Inventory to inventory all the living organisms in the park. This article lists some of the Wildflowers of the Great Smoky Mountains National Park, current threats and resources for further information.

== Threats ==
=== Plant Poaching ===
Plant poaching is a major threat in the park. In particular, ginseng is a popular target. Removal of specimens such as trilliums and orchids for private gardens is also threatening these populations.

=== Invasive Species ===
Introduced forest pests, such as the hemlock woolly adelgid and emerald ash borer are a major threat to the flora of the national parks, targeting over-story species such as the eastern hemlock and ash trees. Several invasive plant species such as wild garlic mustard, kudzu, and multiflora rose can also cause harm by out-competing and displacing native species from the park. Feral hogs are another major invasive threat to the park, as they are habitat generalists that will eat just about anything, including the roots and foliage of the park's wildflowers.

=== Pollution ===
Within the Great Smoky Mountains, air pollution is a well documented threat to both the foliage of the park and its visitors, contributing to stream acidification, ozone symptoms on plants, and high haze levels.

== Examples ==
| Image | Latin name | Common names |
|---|---|---|
| | Aquilegia | Granny's Bonnet or Columbine |
| | Asclepias exaltata | Poke Milkweed |
| | Asclepias hirtella | Tall Green Milkweed or Prairie Milkweed |
| | Asclepias quadrifolia | Fourleaf Milkweed or Whorled Milkweed |
| | Carex plantaginea | Seersucker Sedge or Plaintainleaf Sedge |
| | Caulophyllum thalictroides | Blue Cohosh |
| | Chamaelirium | Blazing-Star, Devil's Bit, False Unicorn, Fairy Wand, or Helonias |
| | Chelone lyonii | Pink Turtleheads, Red Turtleheads, Lyon's Turtleheads, or Appalachian Turtleheads |
| | Claytonia virginica | Eastern Spring Beauty, Virginia Spring Beauty, or Fairy Spud |
| | Clintonia alleghaniensis | White Clintonia, Clinton's Lilly, or Speckled Wood Lily |
| | Conopholis americana | Squawroot |
| | Corunastylis ciliata | Small Purple-fringed Orchid or Fringed Midge Orchid |
| | Cymophyllus fraserianus | Fraser's Sedge |
| | Cypripedioideae | Yellow Lady Slippers |
| | Cypripedium acaule | Pink Lady Slippers |
| | Delphinium tricorne | Dwarf Larkspur |
| | Dicentra canadensis | Squirrel Corn |
| | Dicentra cucullaria | Dutchman's Breeches |
| | Dicentra eximia | Bleeding Heart |
| | Diervilla sessilifolia | Southern Bush Honeysuckle |
| | Diphylleia cymosa | Umbrella Leaf |
| | Dodecatheon meadia | Shooting Stars |
| | Epigaea repens | Mayflower or Trailing Arbutus |
| | Euonymus obovatus | Running Strawberry Bush |
| | Hexastylis arifolia | Little Brown Jug |
| | Asarum virginicum | Virginia Heartleaf |
| | Iris cristata | Dwarf Crested Iris or Crested Iris |
| | Lilium superbum | Turk's Cap, Turban Lily, Swamp Lily, Lily Royal, or American Tiger Lily |
| | Lobelia Cardinalis | Red Cardinal Flower, Red Lobelia, Cardinal Lobelia, Slinkweed, Cardinal Flower, Scarlet Lobelia, Great Lobelia, or Indian Tobacco |
| | Lycopus americanus | Water Horehound |
| | Maianthemum racemosum | Treacleberry or Feathery False Lily of the Valley |
| | Micranthes micranthidifolia | Lettuceleaf Saxifrag, Branch Lettuce, or Brook Lettuce |
| | Mitchella repens | Partridge Berry or Squaw Vine |
| | Monarda didyma | Bee Balm |
| | Monotropsis odorata | Sweet Pinesap or Pygmy Pipes |
| | Orchis Spectabilis | Showy Orchis |
| | Osmorhiza claytonii | Clayton's Sweetroot |
| | Oxalis montana | Mountain Woodsorrel, Wood Shamrock, Sours, or White Woodsorrel |
| | Panax quinquefolius | American Ginseng |
| | Penstemon canescens | Eastern Gray Beardtongue |
| | Phacelia bipinnatifida | Fernleaf Phacelia or Spotted Phacelia |
| | Phacelia fimbriata | Fringed Phacelia |
| | Phacelia purshii | Miami Mist |
| | Prosartes lanuginosa | Yellow Mandarin or Yellow Fairybells |
| | Prosartes maculata | Yellow Mandarin, Spotted Mandarin, or Nodding Mandarin |
| | Rhododendron calendulaceum | Flame Azalea |
| | Rugelia nudicaulis | Rugel's Indian Plantain or Rugel's Ragwort |
| | Sanicula smallii | Small's Blacksnakeroot |
| | Sedum | Stonecrop |
| | Stachys clingmanii | Clingman's Hedgenettle |
| | Synandra hispidula | Guyandotte Beauty |
| | Thalictrum dioicum | Quicksilver-weed |
| | Thalictrum thalictroides | Rue Anemone |
| | Trillium catesbaei | Bashful Wake-robin or Rosy Wake-robin |
| | Trillium luteum | Yellow Wake-robin or Yellow Trillium |
| | Trillium vaseyi | Sweet Wake-robin or Sweet Beth |
| | Viola appalachiensis | Appalachian Blue Violet, Appalachian Violet, or Henry's Violet |
| | Viola pedata | Bird's-foot Violet, Bird's-foot Violet, or Mountain Pansy |
| | Viola rotundifolia | Roundleaf Yellow Violet |
| | Xanthorhiza simplicissima | Yellowroot |

== See also ==
- Wildflowers of New England
- Wildflowers of the Canadian Rocky Mountains
- List of San Francisco Bay Area wildflowers
- Lady Bird Johnson Wildflower Center
- Brandywine Wildflower and Native Plant Gardens

== Resources ==
- Great Smoky Mountains Wildflowers: When & Where to Find Them (Paperback)by Carlos C. Campbell, Aaron J. Sharp, Robert W. Hutson, William F. Hutson, Windy Pines Pub,(April 1996),ISBN 0-9643417-3-5
- Wildflowers Of Tennessee, The Ohio Valley and the Southern Appalachians (Paperback)by Dennis Horn and Tavia Cathcart, Lone Pine Publishing (2005), ISBN 1-55105-428-0
