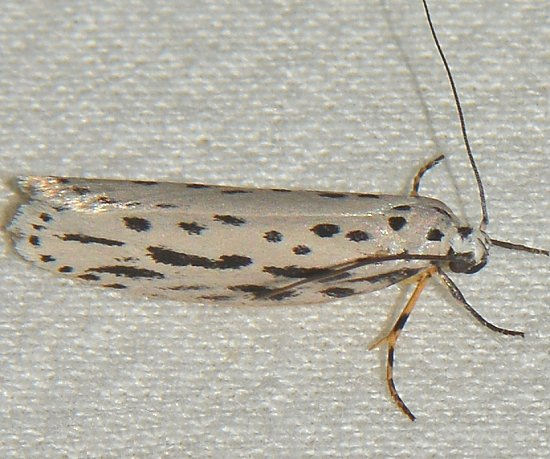

Scientific classification
- Domain: Eukaryota
- Kingdom: Animalia
- Phylum: Arthropoda
- Class: Insecta
- Order: Lepidoptera
- Family: Depressariidae
- Genus: Ethmia
- Species: E. zelleriella

Binomial name
- Ethmia zelleriella (Chambers, 1878)

Synonyms
- Hyponomeuta zelleriella Chambers, 1878; Psecadia zelleriella; Hyponomeuta texanella Chambers, 1880; Psecadia texanella

= Ethmia zelleriella =

Species of moth

Ethmia zelleriella, or Zeller's ethmia moth, is a moth in the family Depressariidae. It is found in eastern North America, from southern Ontario and Quebec through the Ohio Valley and southern Appalachian regions to central Texas.

The length of the forewings is 10.4–12 mm (0.41–0.47 in). The ground color of the forewings is white, dusted with gray along the costa to the midcell. There is a series of elongated black spots more or less evenly distributed over the wing. The ground color of the hindwings is white basally, becoming pale brownish in the apical area. Adults are on wing from April to June (in Ohio and Maryland), May to July (in Indiana). late April and early August (Tennessee) and August (in North Carolina). There are probably two generations per year.

The larvae feed on Phacelia species, including Phacelia dubia and Phacelia bipinnatifida. They feed freely, without a web. They bore into pieces of corky bark of a tree (for instance Ulmus racemosa) to pupate.
