= Wildflowers of New England =

Many species of wildflowers are native to New England. There are four important community types which show considerable diversity and blending across this United States physiographic region. These are: alpine, coniferous forests, northern hardwood forests, and wetlands. Wetlands may be further subdivided into bogs, swamps, and bottomlands. This article lists some of these Wildflowers of New England and references sites for further research.

== Threats ==
Habitat Loss and Invasive Species are major threats to the wildflowers of this region. These invasive species include Purple Loosestrife, Garlic Mustard and Multiflora Rose.

=== Image gallery ===
Spring wildflowers

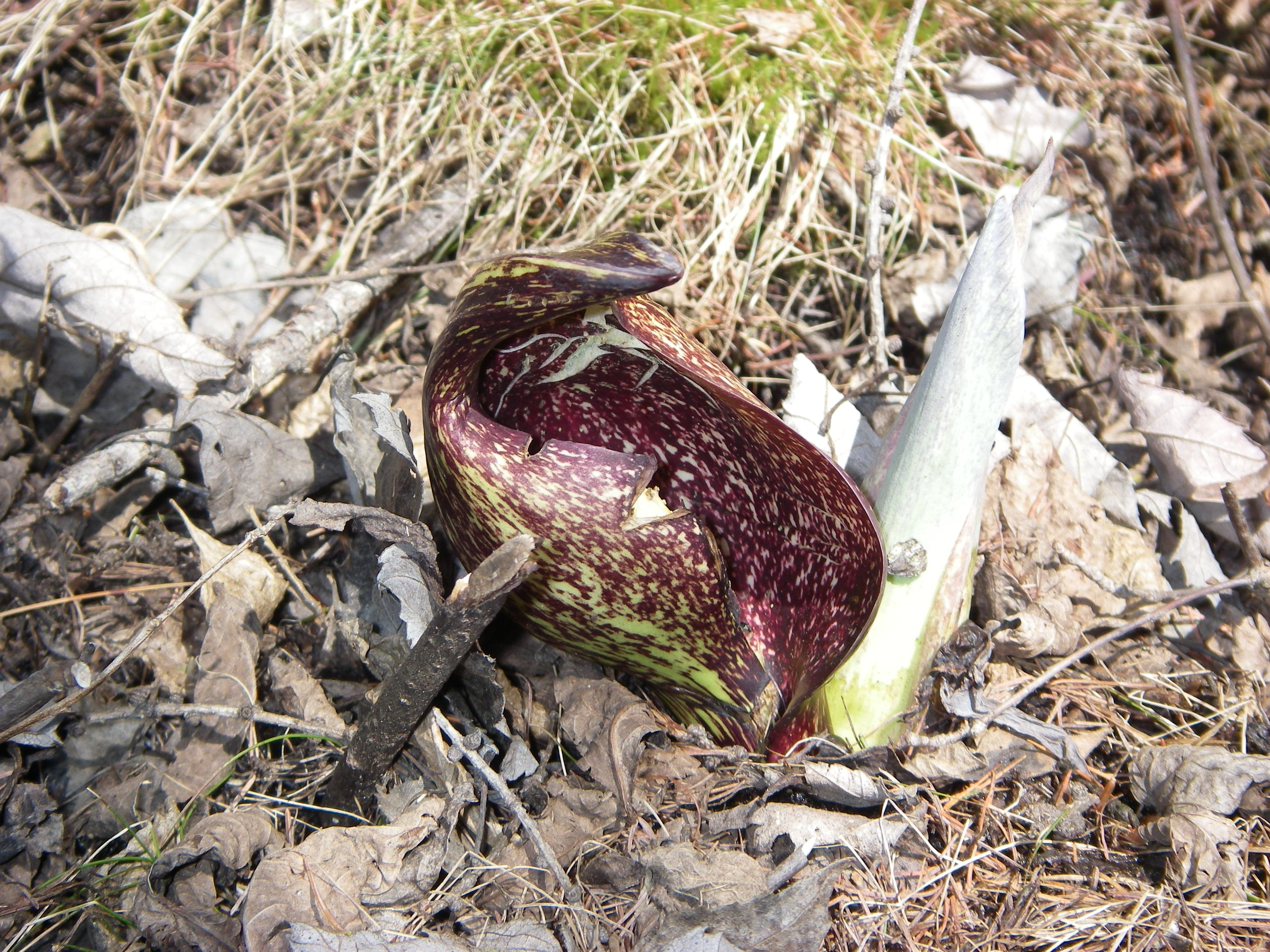
Eastern Skunk Cabbage

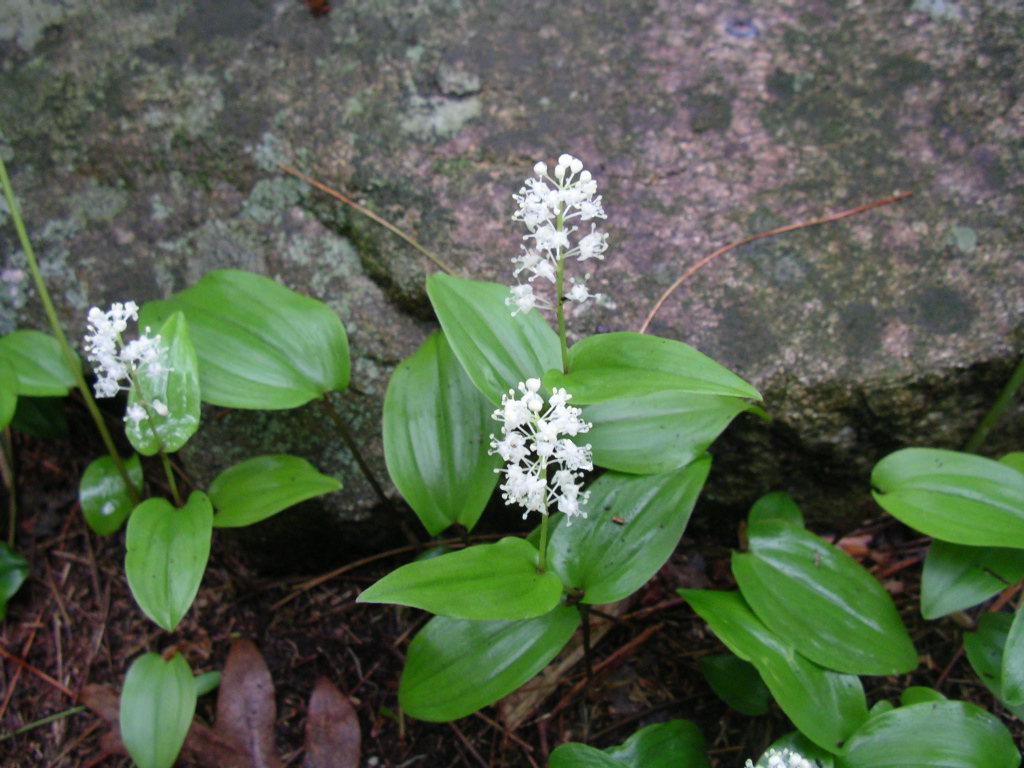
Canada mayflower

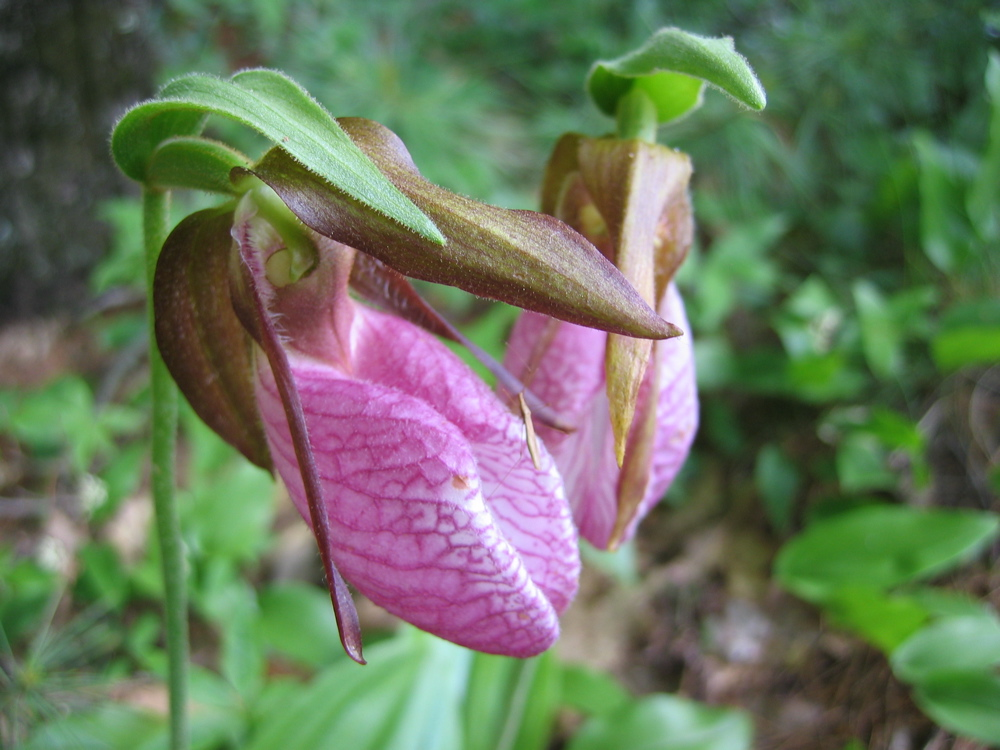
Lady's slipper

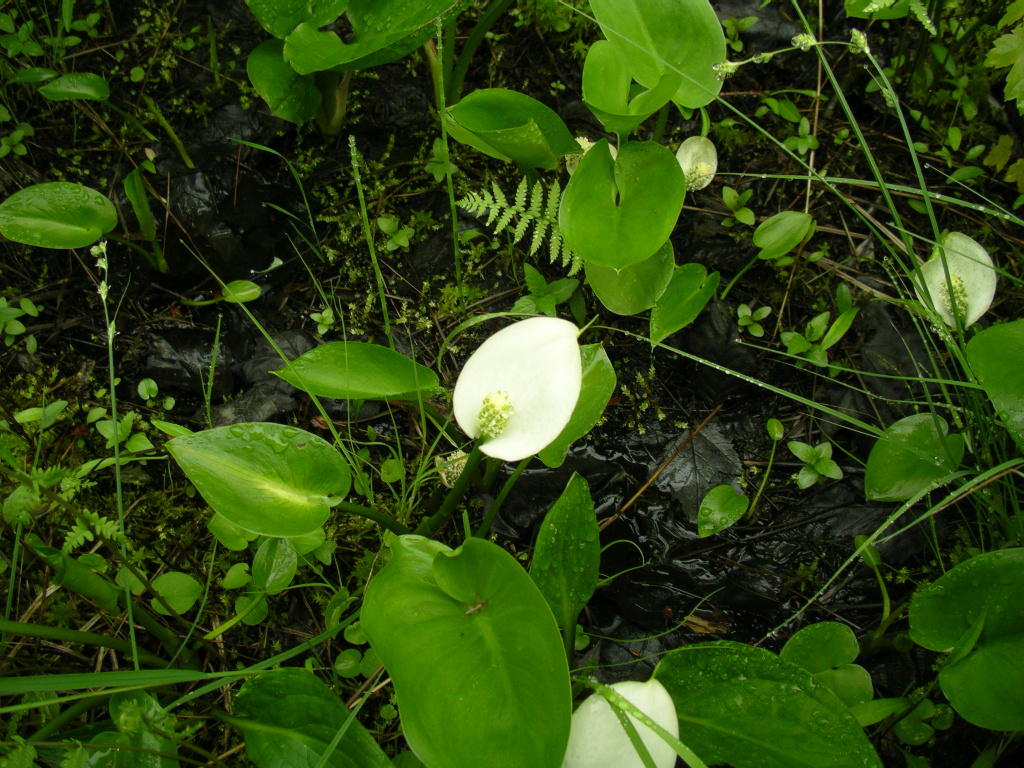
Water Arum

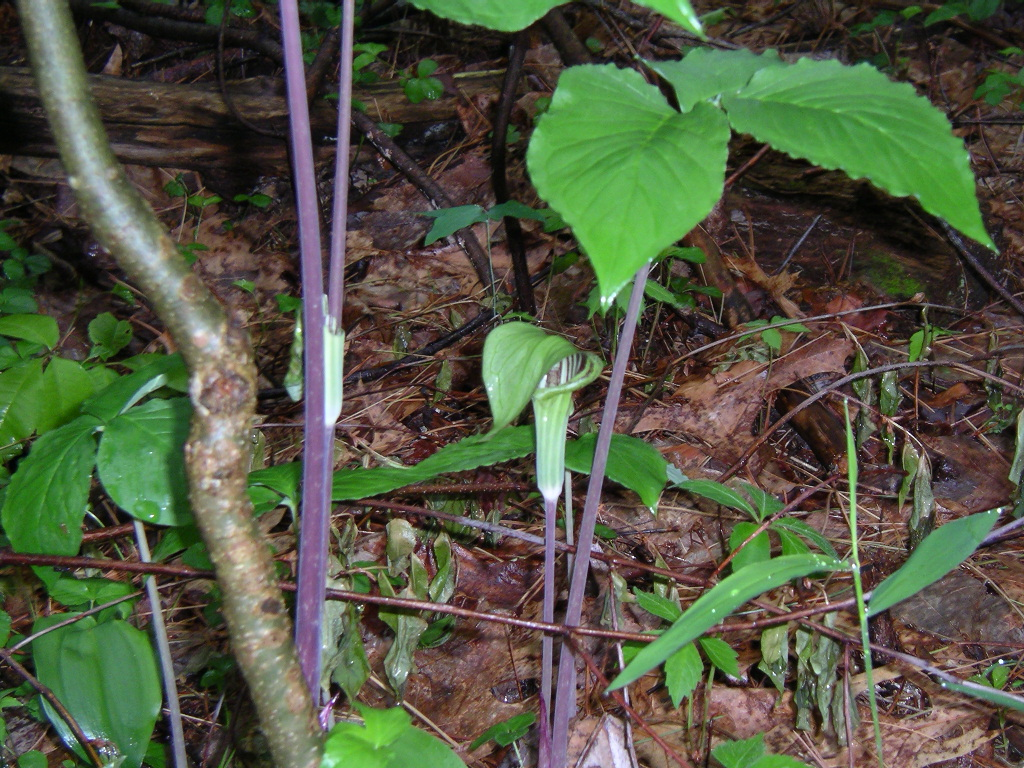
Arisaema triphyllum- Jack in the Pulpit

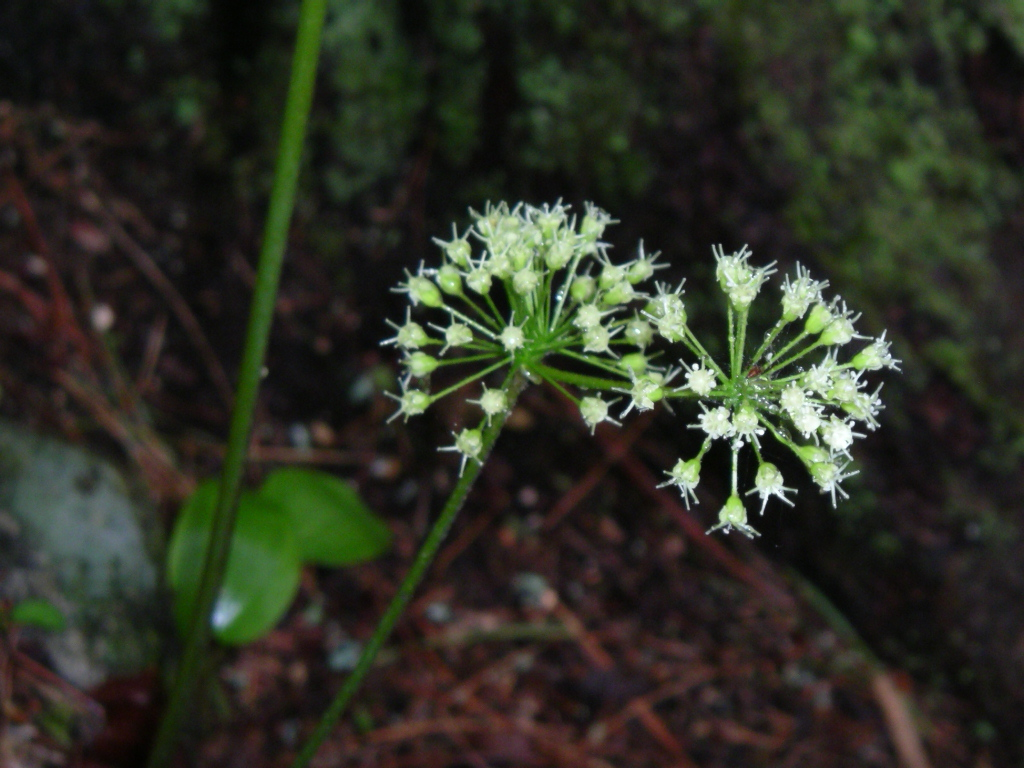
Aralia nudicaulis -Wild Sarsaparilla
Summer and autumn wildflowers

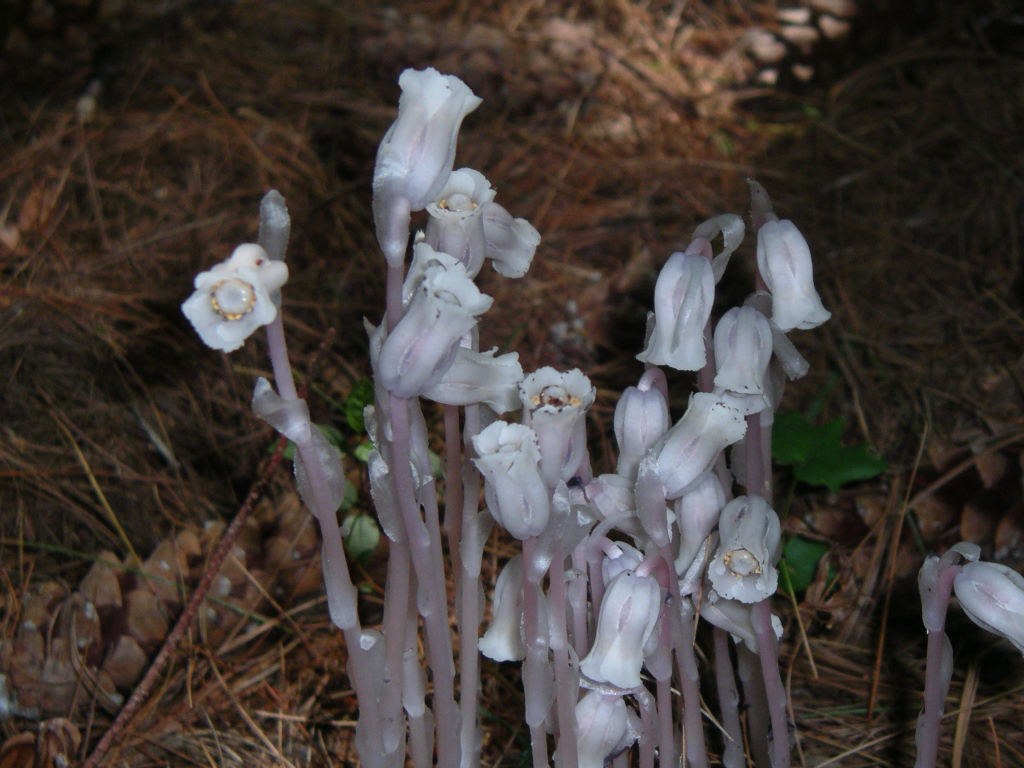
Monotropa uniflora - Indian Pipe

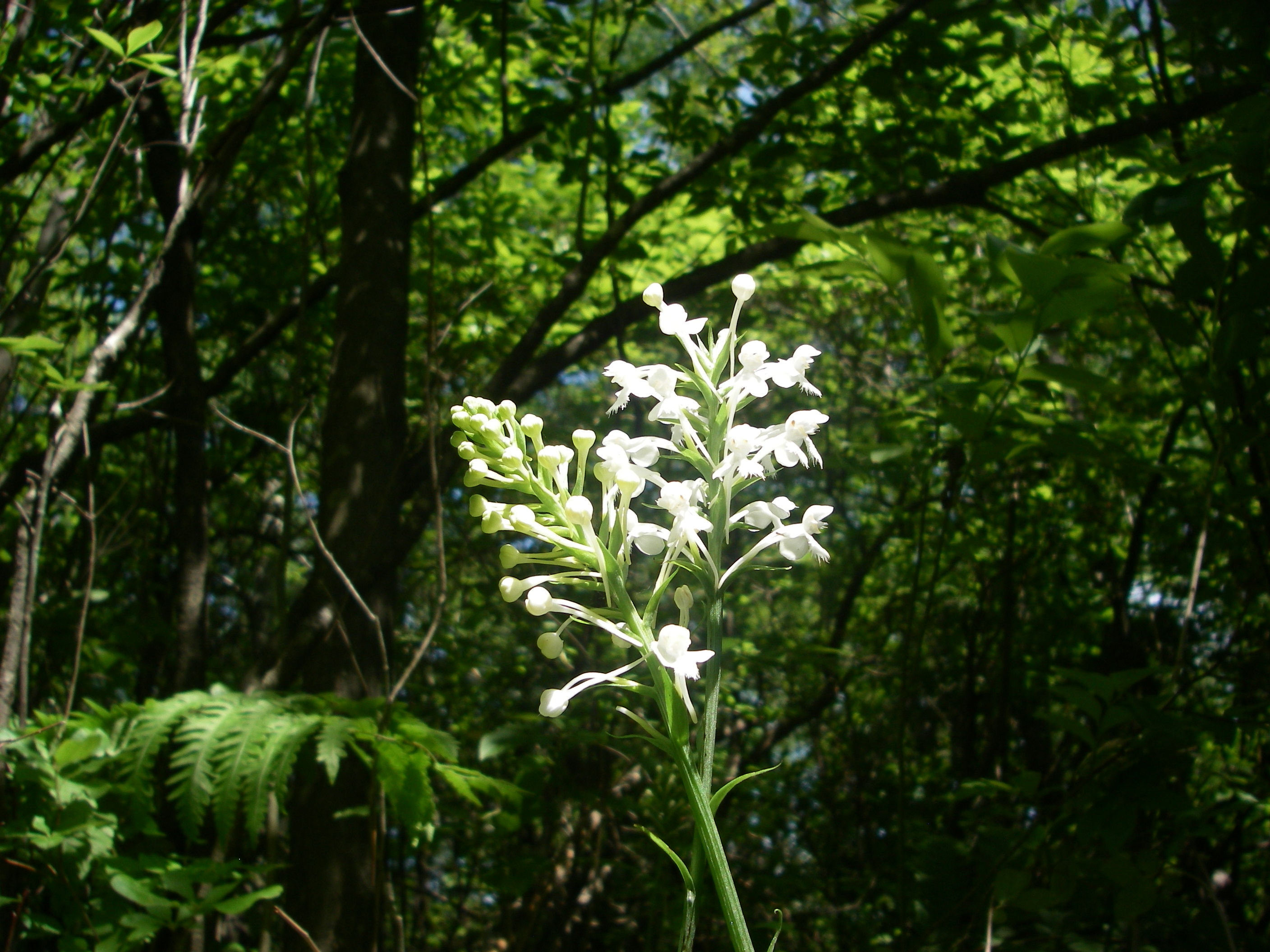
P. blephariglottis -White fringed orchid

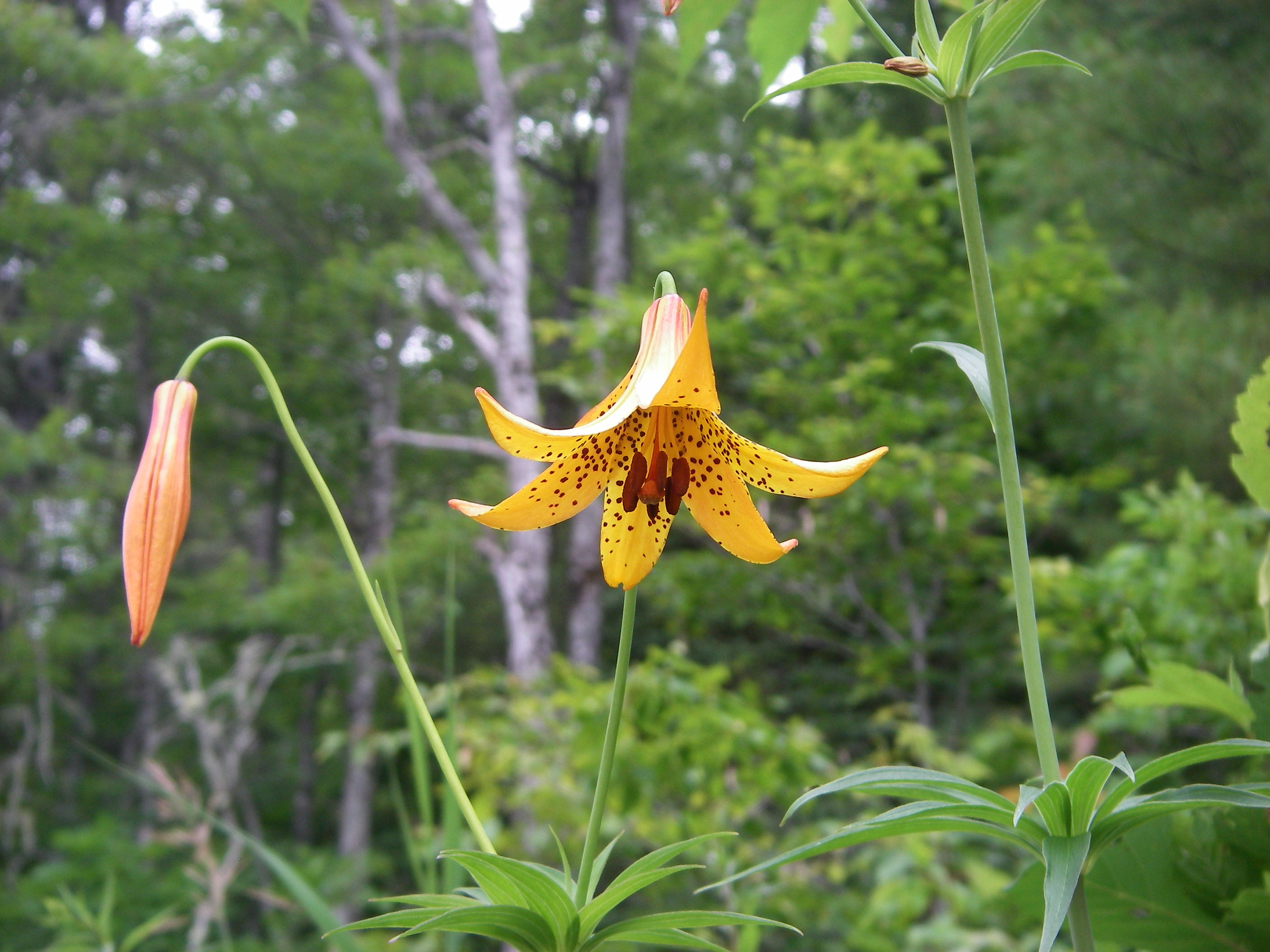
Canada lily

== See also ==
- New England-Acadian forests
- Wildflowers of the Great Smoky Mountains
- Wildflowers of the Canadian Rocky Mountains
- List of San Francisco Bay Area wildflowers
- Lady Bird Johnson Wildflower Center
- Brandywine Wildflower and Native Plant Gardens
- Wildflower Festival

== Resources ==
- Spring Wildflowers of New England by Marilyn Dwelley (Hardcover), Down East Books; 2nd edition (July 2000),ISBN 0-89272-489-7.
- Summer & Fall Wildflowers of New England by Marilyn Dwelley (Hardcover), Down East Books; 2nd revised edition (November 2004),ISBN 0-89272-559-1.
