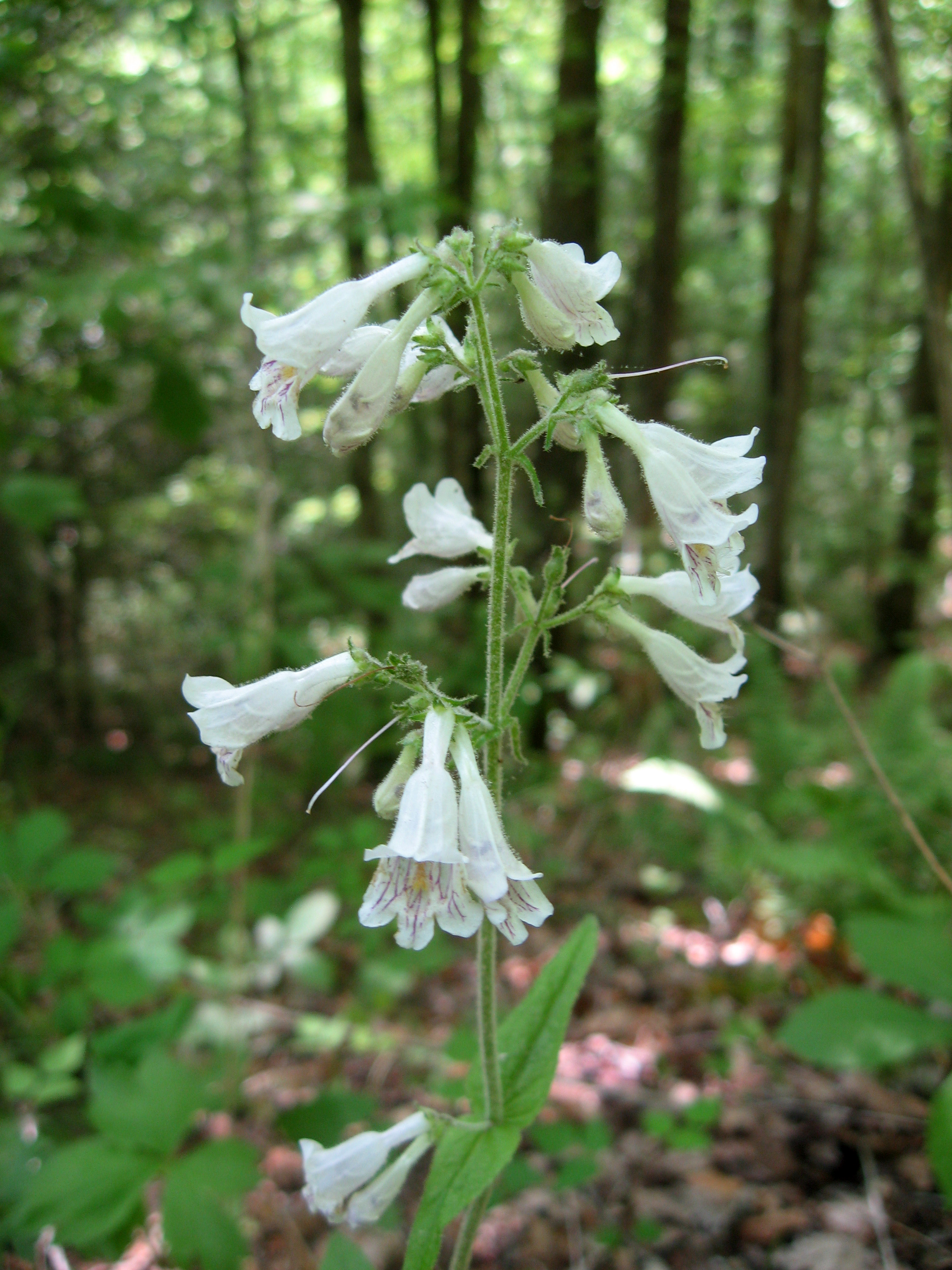

Scientific classification
- Kingdom: Plantae
- Clade: Tracheophytes
- Clade: Angiosperms
- Clade: Eudicots
- Clade: Asterids
- Order: Lamiales
- Family: Plantaginaceae
- Genus: Penstemon
- Species: P. brevisepalus

Binomial name
- Penstemon brevisepalus Pennell

= Penstemon brevisepalus =

Plant species in the plantain family

Penstemon brevisepalus, commonly known as short-sepaled beardtongue, is an herbaceous plant in the plantain family. It is a perennial that produces pale lavender flowers in late spring.

It is native to the eastern United States, where it is restricted to the states of Kentucky, Tennessee, Virginia, and West Virginia. Its natural habitat is acidic woodlands, prairies, and rock outcrops (typically sandstone or shale).

== Description ==
Penstemon brevisepalus has stems that grow outwards a short distance and then curve upwards or that grow straight upwards to heights between 22 and 60 centimeters (8.5 and 23.5 in). They may be either covered in backwards facing hairs that are glandular or glandular and villous, covered in long hairs. They are never hairless. Plants have both cauline and basal leaves, ones that attach to the stems and ones that grow directly from the base of the plant. Though sometimes the basal leaves will have faded by the time the plant flowers. They are covered in sparse to dense hairs on their undersides while only being sparsely hairy to hairless on their upper sides. The basal leaves and lowest ones on the stems are 2 to 9.5 cm (0.8 to 3.7 in) long and 1.1 to 2.8 cm (0.4 to 1.1 in) wide. Their shape is ovate to lanceolate or oblanceolate with a tapering base.

Penstemon brevisepalus has an inflorescence that is 4 to 20 centimeters (1.6 to 7.9 in) tall with three to eight groups of flowers. These flowers are funnel shaped and 1.5–2.4 cm (0.6–0.9 in) long. They are pale lavender to purple in color with dark reddish purple nectar guides and are produced in May or June.

== Taxonomy ==
This species was scientifically described in 1933 by botanist Francis W. Pennell. In 1963 Robert H. Mohlenbrock and William Wallace published a short paper arguing for its inclusion in Penstemon pallidus. It was subsequently included under Penstemon canescens or Penstemon pallidus in later 20th century treatments. However, it is now listed as accepted by Plants of the World Online.

=== Names ===
Penstemon brevisepalus is known by the common name short-sepaled beardtongue.

== Range and habitat ==
It grow in southwestern Virginia, West Virginia, Tennessee and Kentucky. It grows in relatively dry, rocky Oak–hickory forests and also at the edges of woodlands. It may also be found growing in roadcuts and along bluffs. They are found at elevations over 200 meters (660 ft) up to 700 m (2,300 ft).

=== Conservation ===
The conservation group NatureServe has not evaluated Penstemon brevisepalus.

== See also ==
- List of Penstemon species
