= List of San Francisco Bay Area wildflowers =

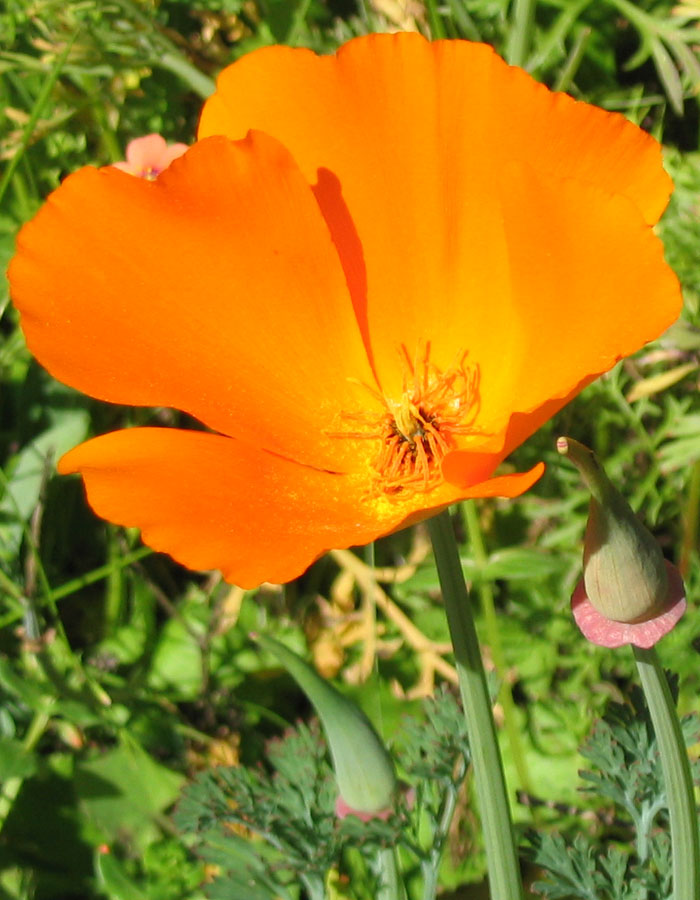
California poppy

This is a list of San Francisco Bay Area wildflowers. The San Francisco Bay Area is unusual, for a major metropolitan area, in having ready access to rural and wilderness areas, as well as major urban parks.

== List scope ==
The native plants of the San Francisco Bay Area are not always typical of other regions of California, and some species are endemic. This list covers the flowers of the Bay Area one is most likely to see within its nine counties. It starts with flowers that are (a) common and/or (b) already have an article in Wikipedia. Flowering shrubs and trees are only included if their flowers are visually significant.

== List ==
The list is divided into forbs (herbs), shrubs, and trees.

=== Flowering herbs (forbs) ===
- California poppy, Eschscholzia californica
- Purple Chinese houses, Collinsia heterophylla
- San Francisco collinsia, Collinsia multicolor
- Yellow pansy, Viola pedunculata
- Franciscan wallflower, Erysimum franciscanum
- Douglas iris, Iris douglasiana
- Baby blue-eyes, Nemophila menziesii
- Coral bells, Heuchera spp.
- Western blue-eyed grass, Sisyrinchium bellum
- Calypso orchid, Calypso bulbosa
- Fiddlenecks, Amsinckia
- Blue flax, Linum lewisii
- Cow parsnip, Heracleum maximum
- Common star lily, Toxicoscordion fremontii
- Crimson columbine, Aquilegia formosa
- Wavy-leafed soap plant, Chlorogalum pomeridianum
- Farewell to spring, Clarkia amoena

=== Bushes, shrubs, and climbers ===
- Bush lupin, Lupinus ssp.
- Manzanitas, Arctostaphylos spp.
- California wild grape, Vitis californica
- California lilacs, Ceanothus spp.
- Pipestem clematis, Clematis lasiantha
- Salmonberry, Rubus spectabilis
- California rose, Rosa californica
- California huckleberry, Vaccinium ovatum
- California manroot, Marah fabacea
- Currants, Ribes spp.
- Chaparral currant, Ribes malvaceum

=== Flowering trees ===
- California buckeye, Aesculus californica
- Black elderberry, Sambucus nigra
- Pacific madrone, Arbutus menziesii
- Coast live oak, Quercus agrifolia

== Garden escapes ==
Garden escapes are introduced species, plants that have established in the area - via their seeds, underground runners, or by exuberant growth - beyond the limits of gardens where planted. Some may be reproducing in the wild as invasive species and noxious weeds. Because of the large population of the Bay Area and its variety of garden styles, many plant species may be encountered as garden escapes.

Among those seen are:

- Acacia spp.
- Bougainvillea spp.
- Common Broom (Spanish, French, others)
- Cortaderia spp. (Pampas grass)
- Eucalyptus spp.
- Forget-me-nots (Myosotis discolor and M. latifolia)
- Ice plant - several genera
- Ivy - Hedera spp.
- Lavender
- Nassella tenuissima - Mexican feather grass
- Pelargonium spp.
- Pennisetum setaceum
- Rubus armeniacus – Himalayan blackberry
- Searocket
- Vinca major

=== Weeds ===
- Purple salsify
- Artichoke thistle
- Red Valerian
- Herb Robert
- Wild radish
- Scarlet pimpernel
- Pale flax

== See also ==
- List of California native plants
- Index: Flora of the San Francisco Bay Area
