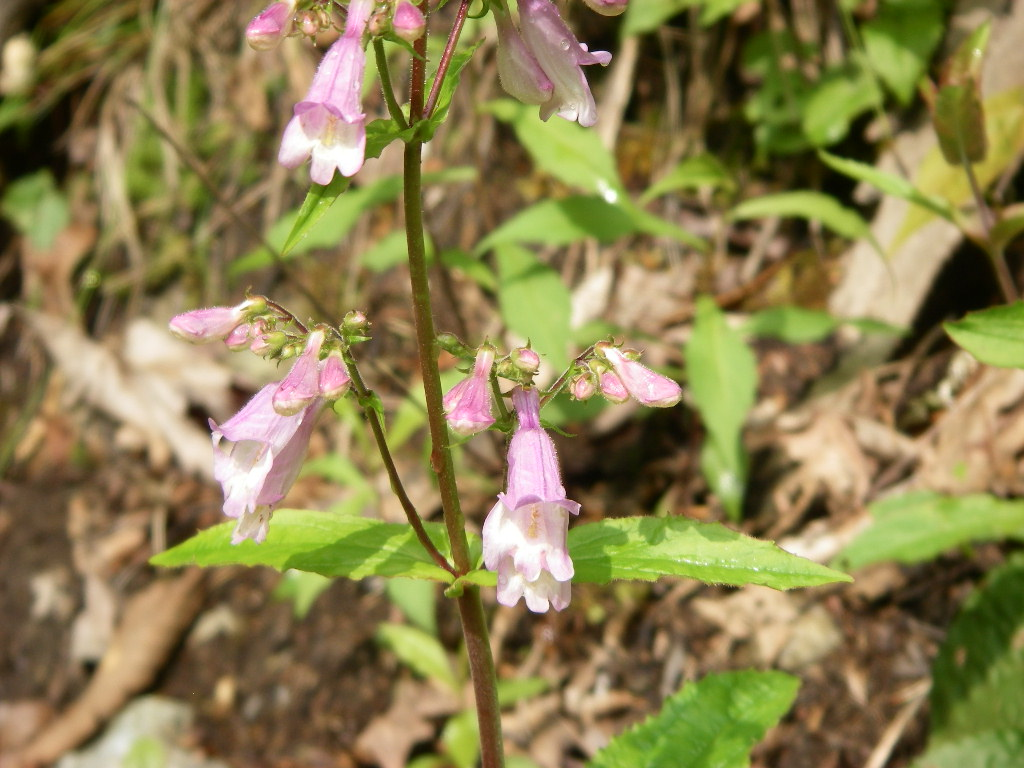

Conservation status
- Apparently Secure (NatureServe)

Scientific classification
- Kingdom: Plantae
- Clade: Tracheophytes
- Clade: Angiosperms
- Clade: Eudicots
- Clade: Asterids
- Order: Lamiales
- Family: Plantaginaceae
- Genus: Penstemon
- Species: P. canescens

Binomial name
- Penstemon canescens Britton

Synonyms
- Penstemon brittanorum Pennell ex Peattie; Penstemon brittoniorum Pennell; Penstemon canescens subsp. brittoniorum (Pennell) Pennell; Penstemon canescens subsp. typicus Pennell

= Penstemon canescens =

Plant species in the plantain family

Penstemon canescens, commonly known as the gray beardtongue or Appalachian beardtongue, is a species of penstemon in the family Plantaginaceae. It is native to woodlands, forest edges, and roadsides of the southeastern United States and flowers May through July. It is a perennial herb producing stems reaching 80 cm (31 in) in maximum height.

== Description ==
Penstem canescens is an herbaceous plant with one or more unbranched stems that may grow 20 to 80 centimeters (8 to 31 in) tall, though usually taller than 35 cm (14 in). The stems may be erect or ascending, growing straight upwards or growing out and then curving to grow upright. They are always at least glandular-pubescent, covered in sticky glandular hairs, towards their ends, but are very often covered for their whole length with backwards pointing hairs.

It has both a rosette and cauline leaves, those that attach directly to the base of the plant in a circle and ones that grow on the stems. The leaves in the rosette and the lowest of the cauline leaves are 2.8–17 centimeters (1–6.5 in) long and1.1–4.2 cm (0.4–1.7 in) wide. Their shape varies from orbicular, obovate, to elliptic with a tapered base and edges that are irregularly serrated or wavy. Each stem will have three to seven pairs of leaves attached on opposite sides. The upper leaves will be sessile, attached directly to the stem, or attached by very short petioles. Upper leaves have the same range of lengths, but are narrower, 0.9 to 4 cm wide, and are oblanceolate to lanceolate in shape.

Pinkish-purple, pale purple, or violet flowers appear in a terminal panicle. The corolla is tubular with two lips, the upper lip is two-lobed while the lower lip is three-lobed. The throat of the corolla is white with a purple stripes out of which extends a yellow, hairy staminode. Flowering usually occurs from May through July, but might happen as early as April or as late as September.

== Taxonomy ==
The botanist Nathaniel Lord Britton scientifically described and named Penstemon canescens in 1894.

=== Names ===
In English Penstemon canescens is known by several common names. It may be simply called beardtongue or penstemon, but to distinguish it from other species in the genus it is called the gray beardtongue. It is also called Appalachian beardtongue and hairy beardtongue.

== Range and habitat ==
Penstemon canescens is native to the eastern United States as far north as Pennsylvania and as far south as Alabama. Its range extends west to Illinois. In Pennsylvania it grows in the south central mountain counties such as Snyder, Huntingdon, and Bedford. It extends through much of Virginia, but more in the western mountain counties while in West Virginia it is mainly found in the east and south. Similarly it grows in the farthest west portions of North Carolina and three counties at the western tip of South Carolina. It is almost entirely confined to the northern counties of Georgia, with an outlier in Rockdale. It is found in six widely scattered counties in Alabama while mostly growing in the eastern half of Tennessee with a few scattered locations in the west. The range is also widely scattered in Kentucky while being found in mostly southern counties of Indiana. In found in just Franklin County, Illinois and Lawrence County, Ohio while the locations of occurrences is not recorded for Maryland.

It requires well drained soils to avoid rotting roots. They grow within forests, thickets, on cliffs, and pine barrens.

=== Conservation ===
Penstemon canescens was evaluated by NatureServe in 1984 and rated apparently secure (G4). In the central part of its range in Kentucky it was rated as secure (S5) and apparently secure (S4) in West Virginia and Virginia. Towards the edges of its range they rated it vulnerable (S3) in Pennsylvania, Ohio, and North Carolina. Similarly it is rated as imperiled (S2) in South Carolina. In Alabama, Illinois, and Indiana it is rated as critically imperiled (S1). It has not been rated in the rest of its range.

== See also ==
List of Penstemon species
