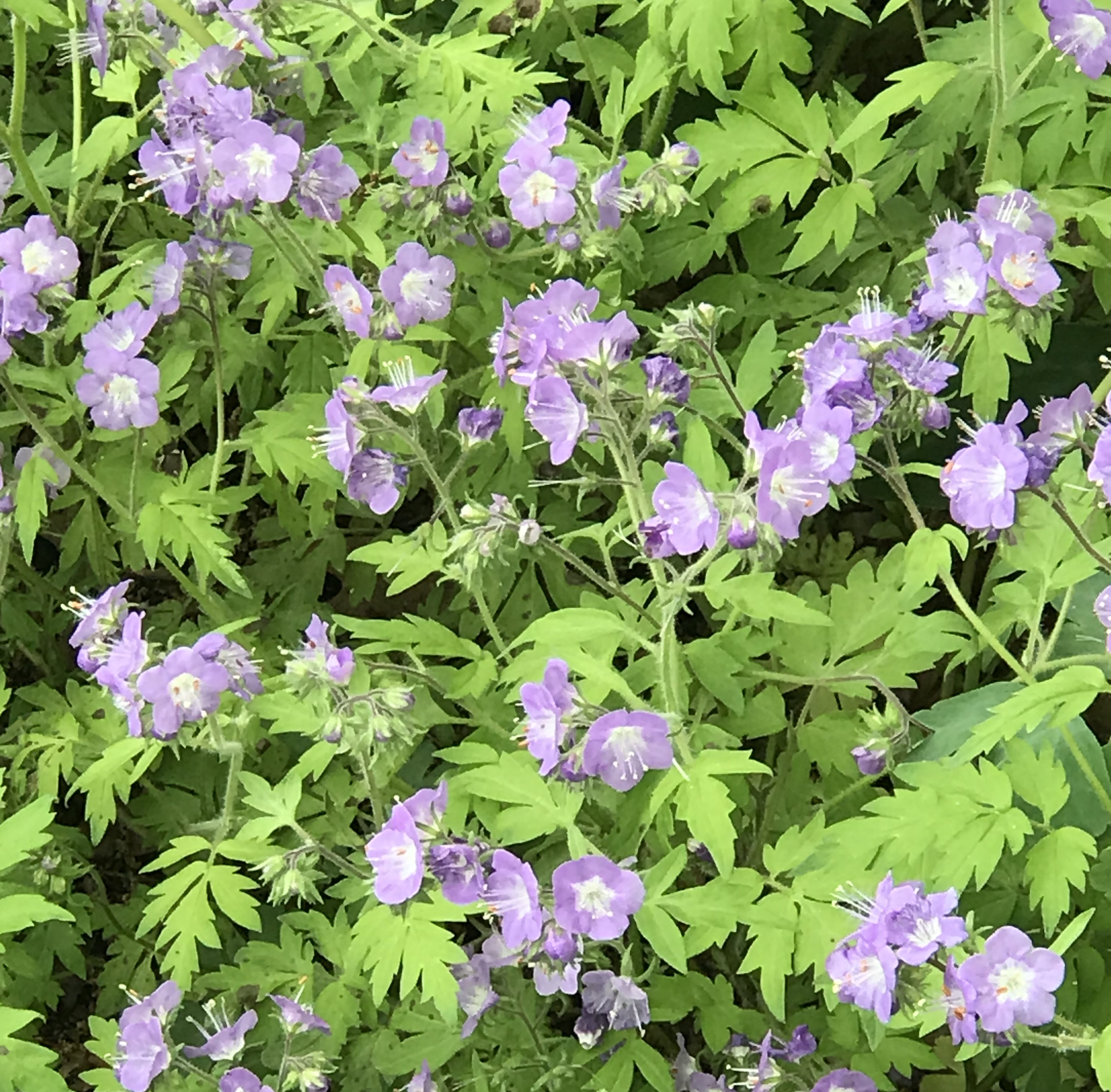
- Phacelia bipinnatifida in the New York Botanical Garden

Conservation status
- Secure (NatureServe)

Scientific classification
- Kingdom: Plantae
- Clade: Tracheophytes
- Clade: Angiosperms
- Clade: Eudicots
- Clade: Asterids
- Order: Boraginales
- Family: Hydrophyllaceae
- Genus: Phacelia
- Species: P. bipinnatifida

Binomial name
- Phacelia bipinnatifida Michx.

= Phacelia bipinnatifida =

Species of plant

Phacelia bipinnatifida, commonly known as purple phacelia, fernleaf phacelia and spotted phacelia is a species of phacelia native to the southeastern United States.

It is a biennial plant growing up to 2 feet (61 centimetres) tall. The flowers bloom in spring and are five petaled and lavender-blue in color and up to two centimeters diameter. It grows in cool, moist woods.
