= List of wildflowers of the Canadian Rocky Mountains =

Wildflowers of the Canadian Rocky Mountains is an image list of flowering plants found in the Rocky Mountains in Canada.

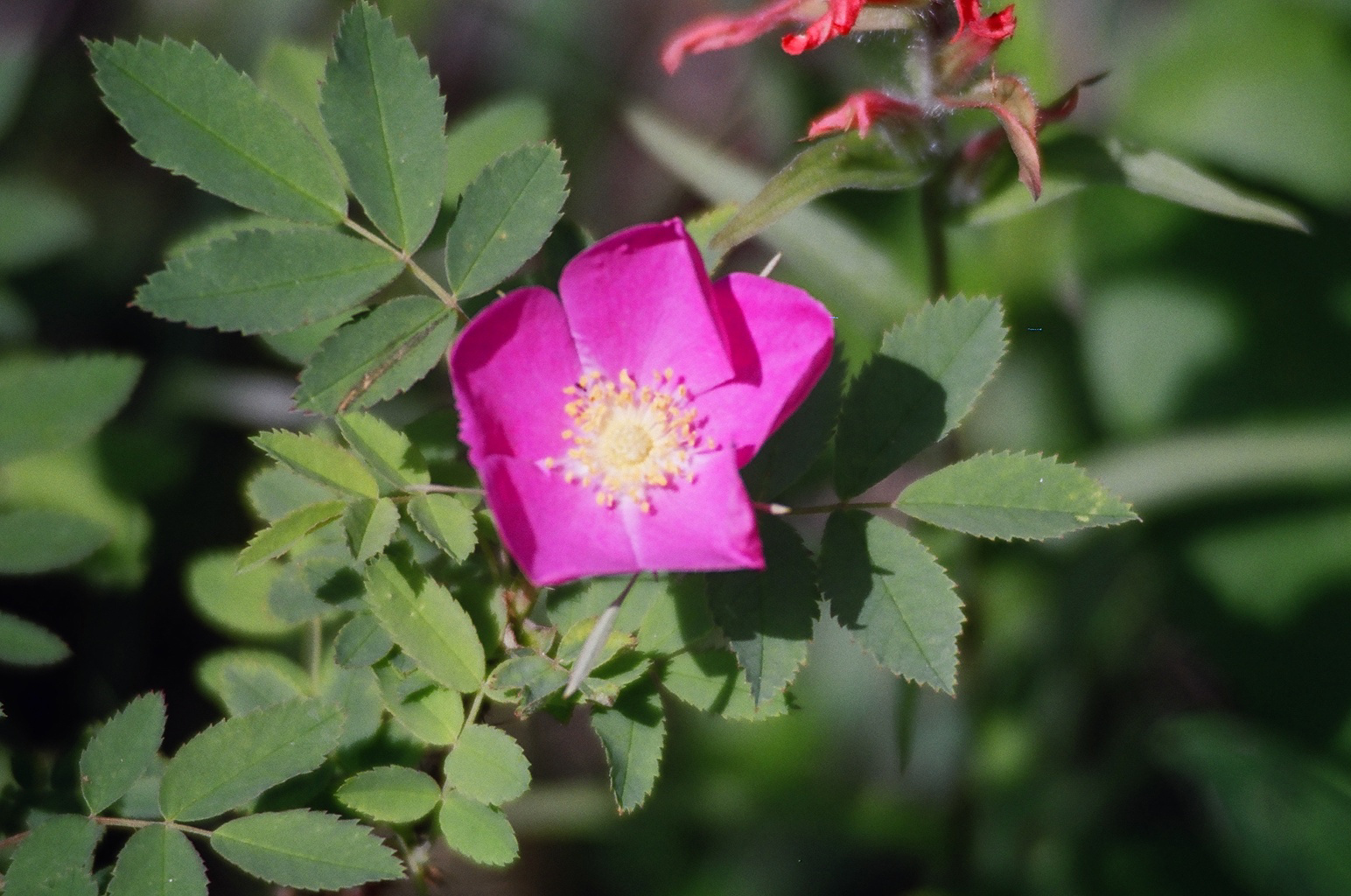
Alberta wild rose

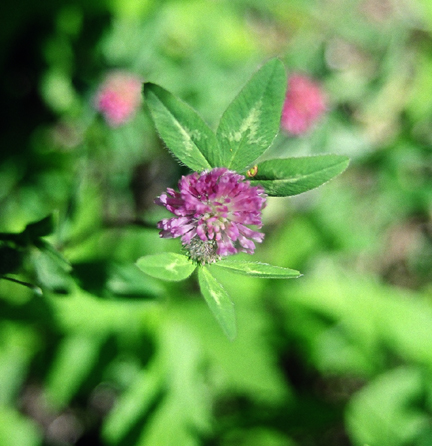
Alfalfa

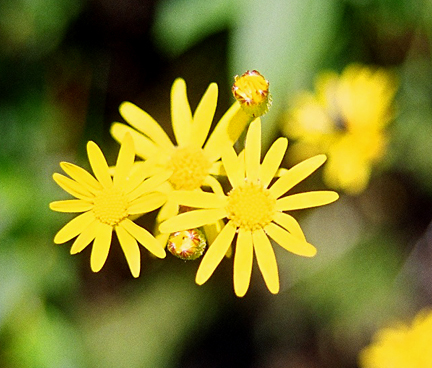
Arnica

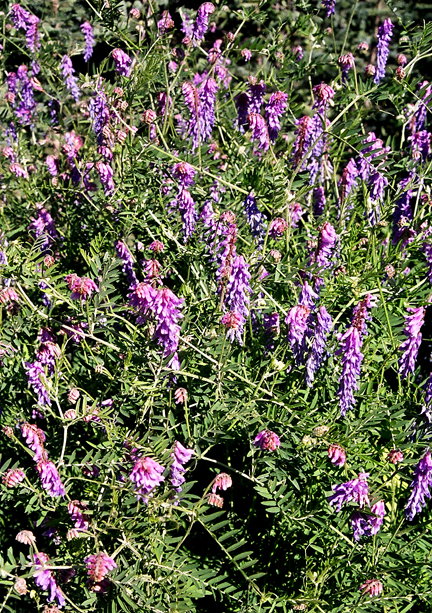
Bird vetch

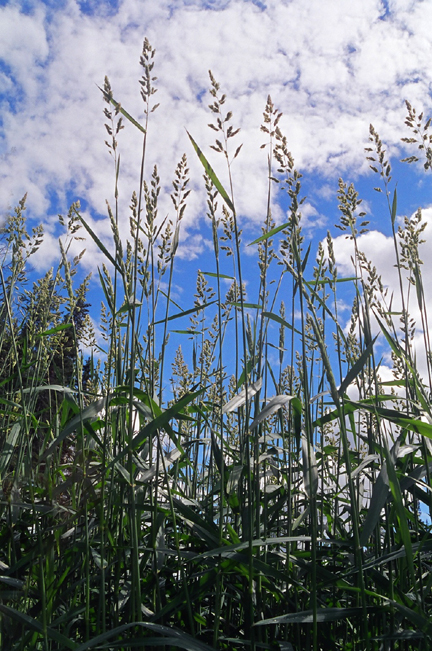
Brome

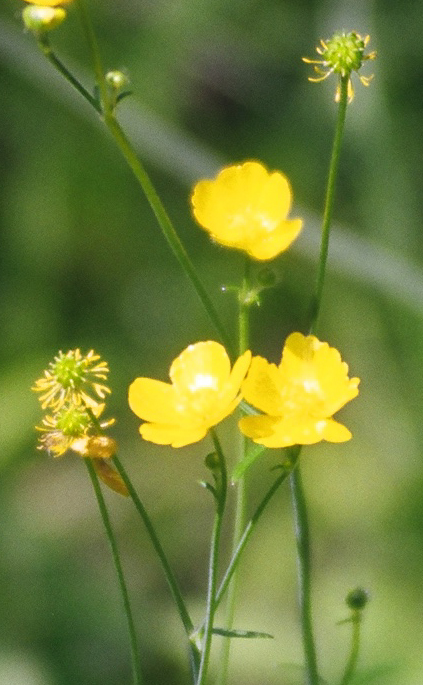
Buttercup

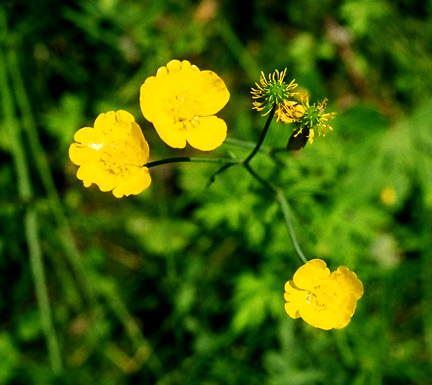
Buttercup

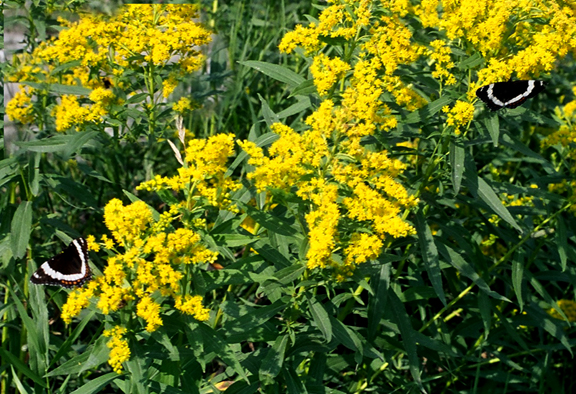
Canadian goldenrod

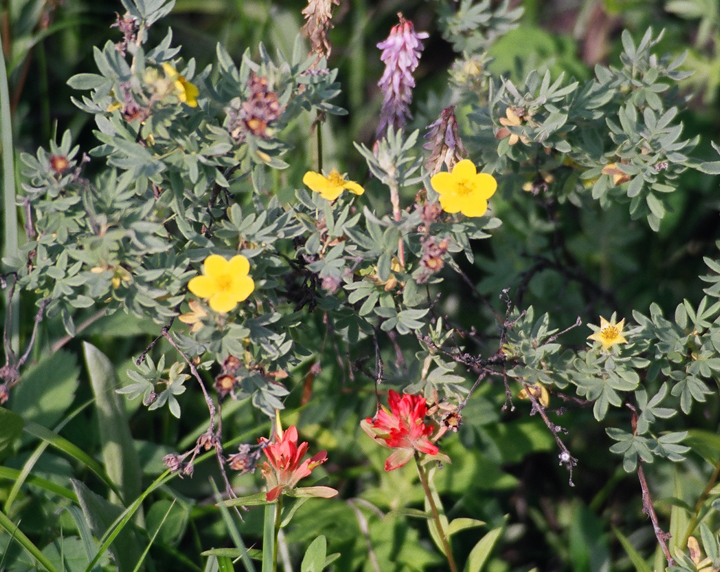
Cinqfoil

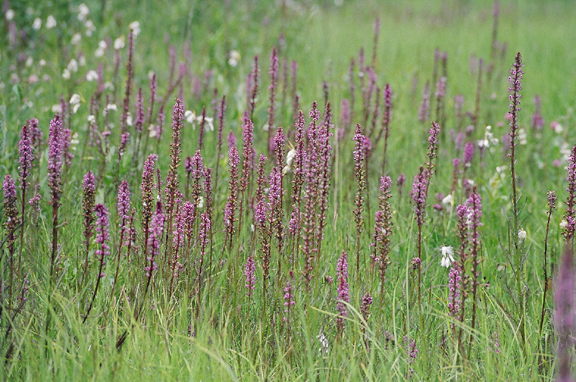
Elephant head

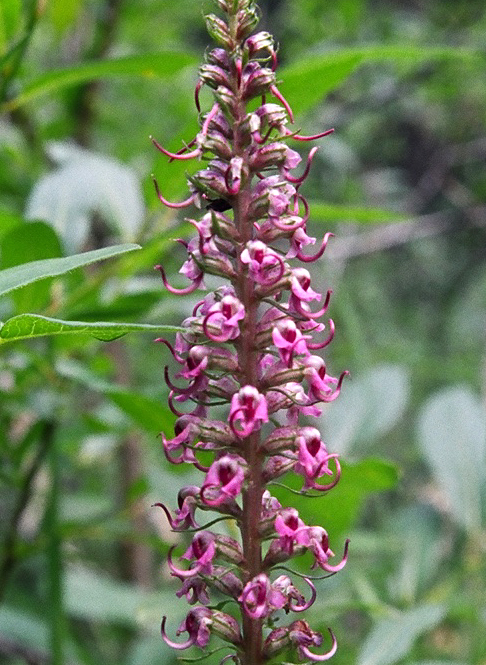
Elephant head (close)

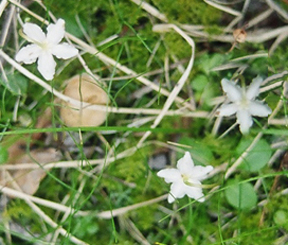
Fairy bell

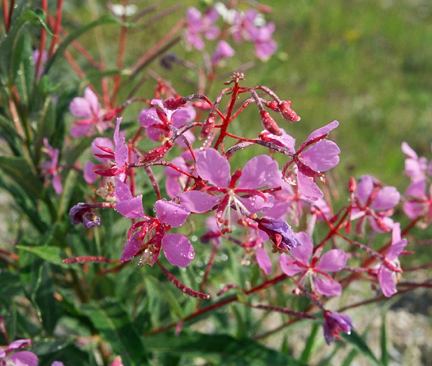
Fireweed blossoms

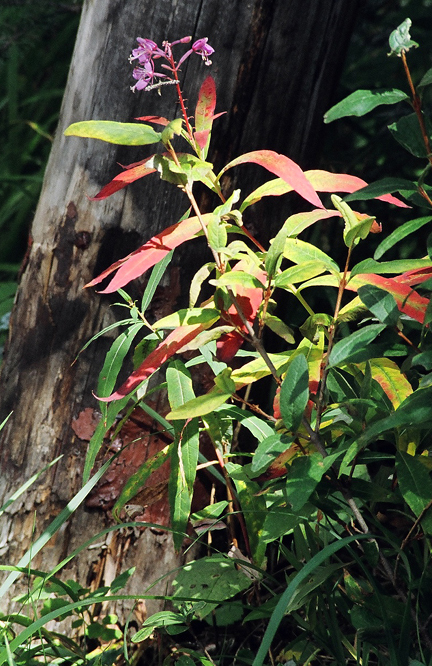
Fireweed - late-season colors

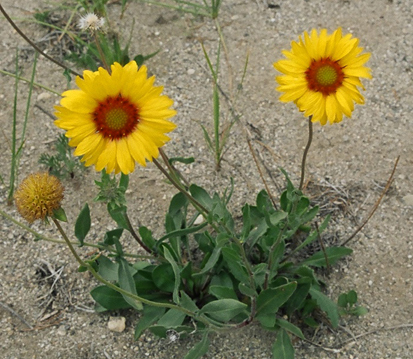
Gaillardia (blanketflower)

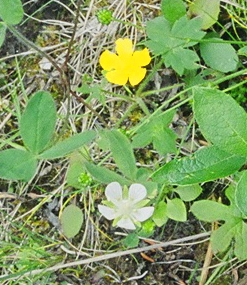
Grass-of-Parnassus and buttercup comparison

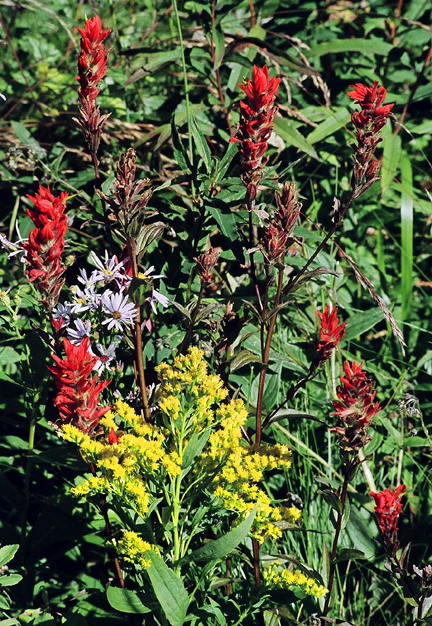
A late-summer grouping - paintbrush, aster, and goldenrod

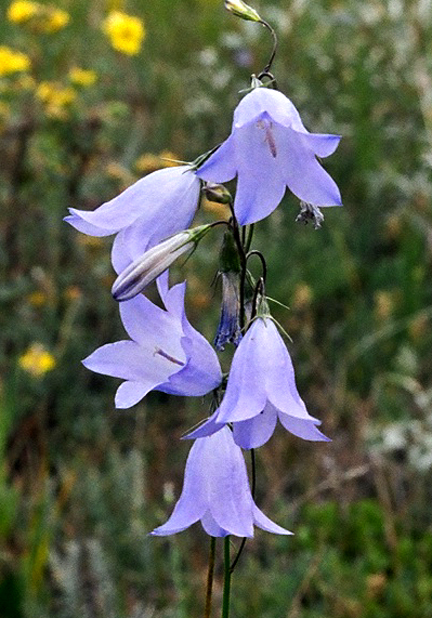
Harebell

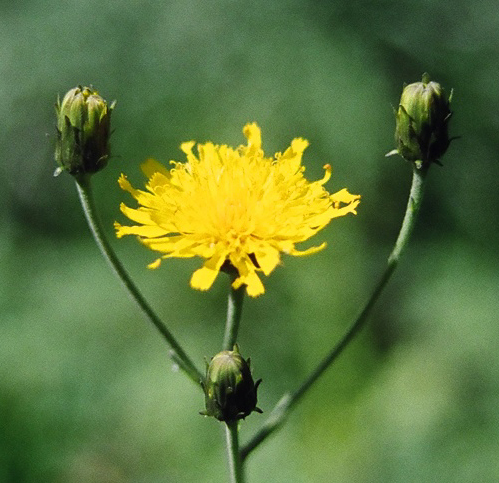
Narrow-leaved hawkweed

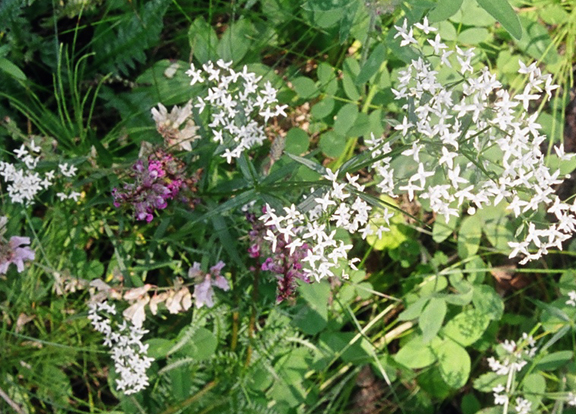
Northern bedstraw

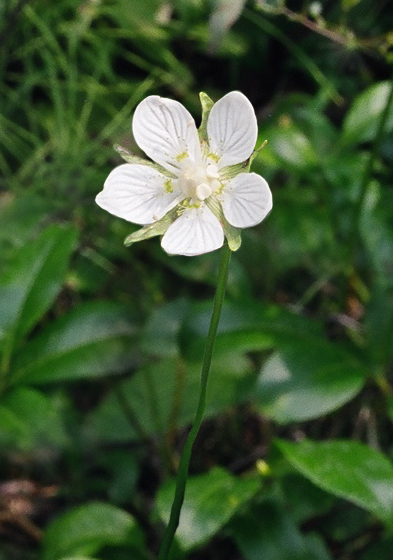
Northern Grass-of-Parnassus

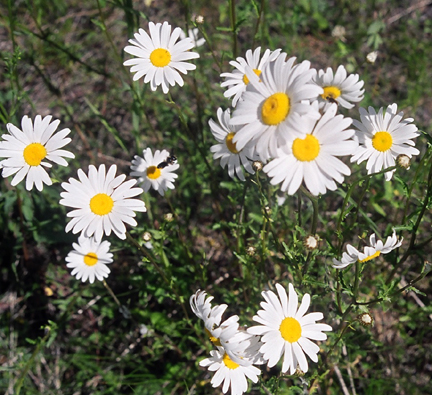
Ox-eye (English) daisy (invasive)

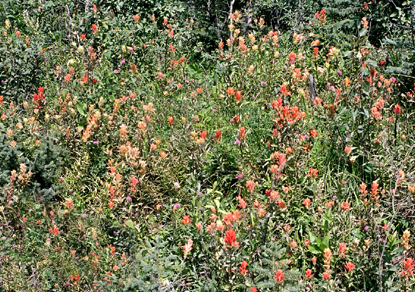
Paintbrush can be found in a wide range of colors from white through crimson

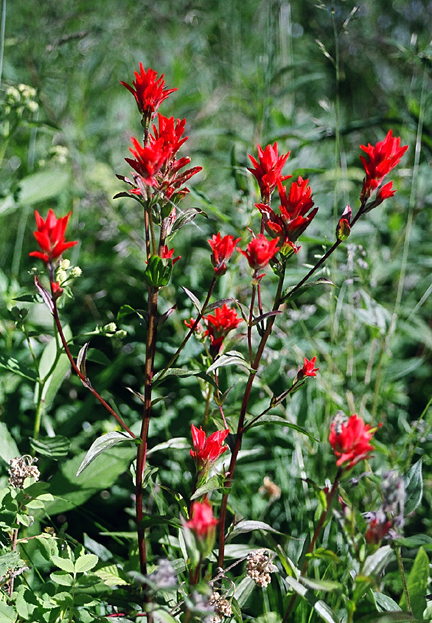
Red paintbrush

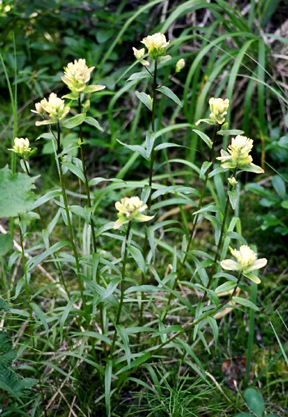
White paintbrush

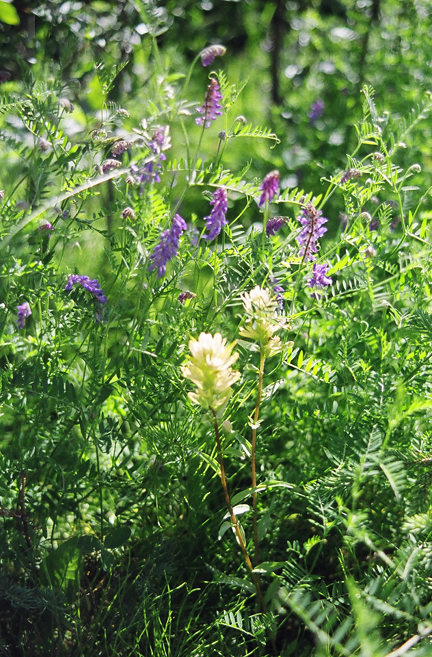
White paintbrush framed by Bird vetch

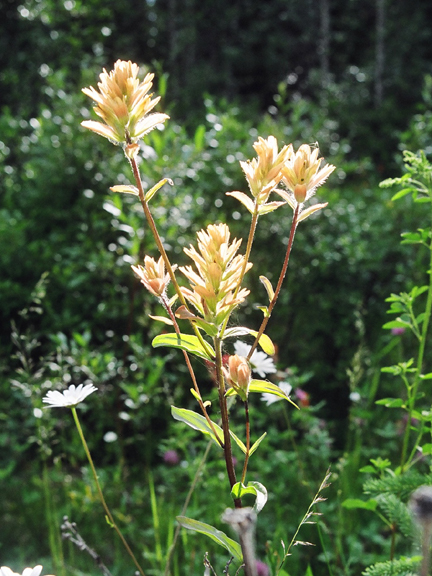
Yellow paintbrush

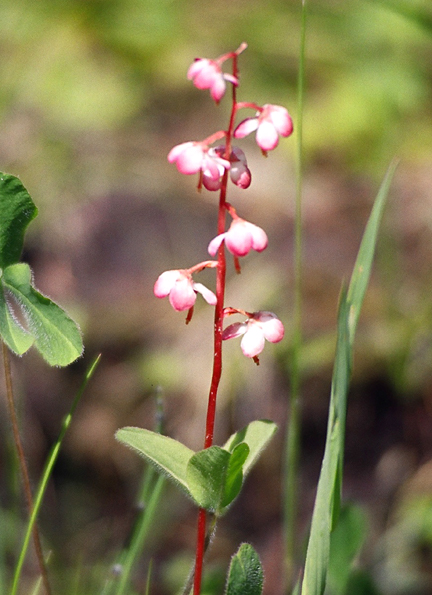
Pink wintergreen

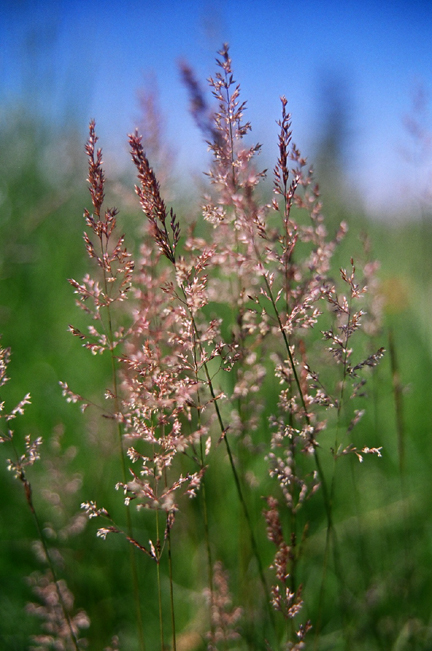
Rough fescue (grass)

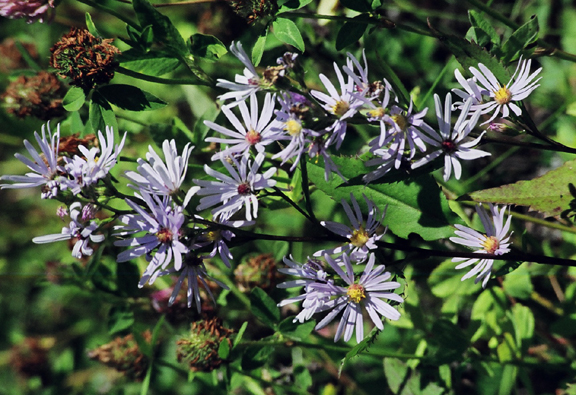
Showy wood aster

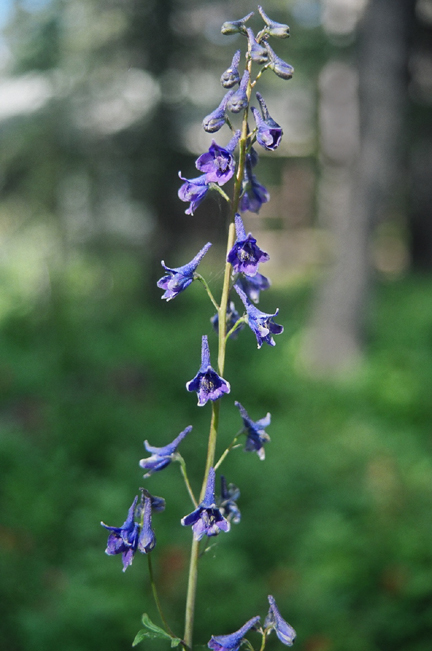
Tower larkspur / Tall delphinium

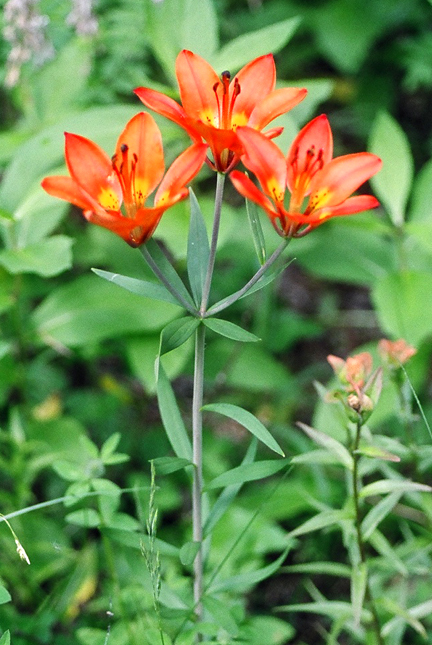
Western wood lily

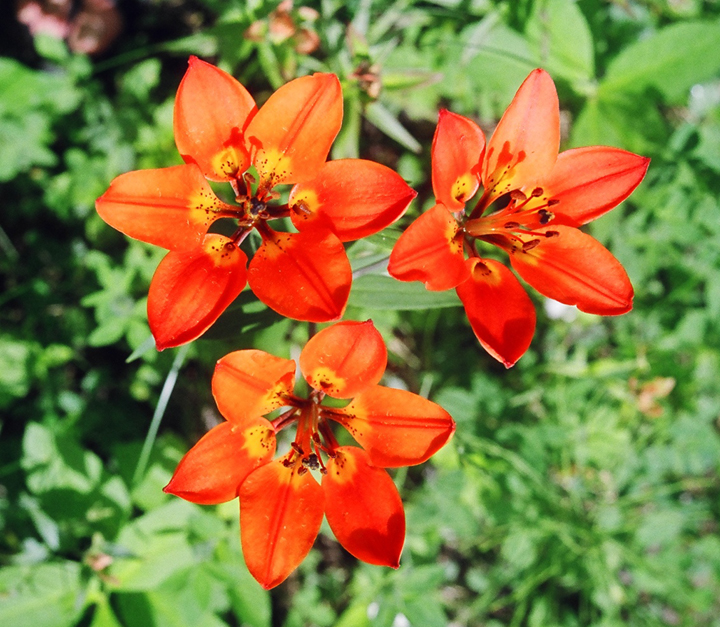
Western wood lily (above)

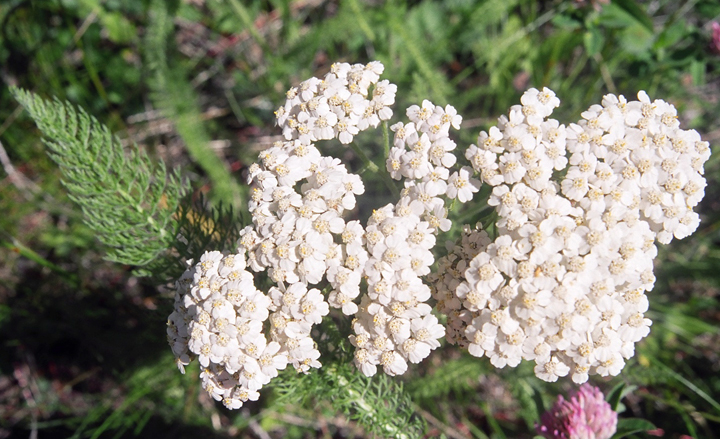
Western (white) yarrow

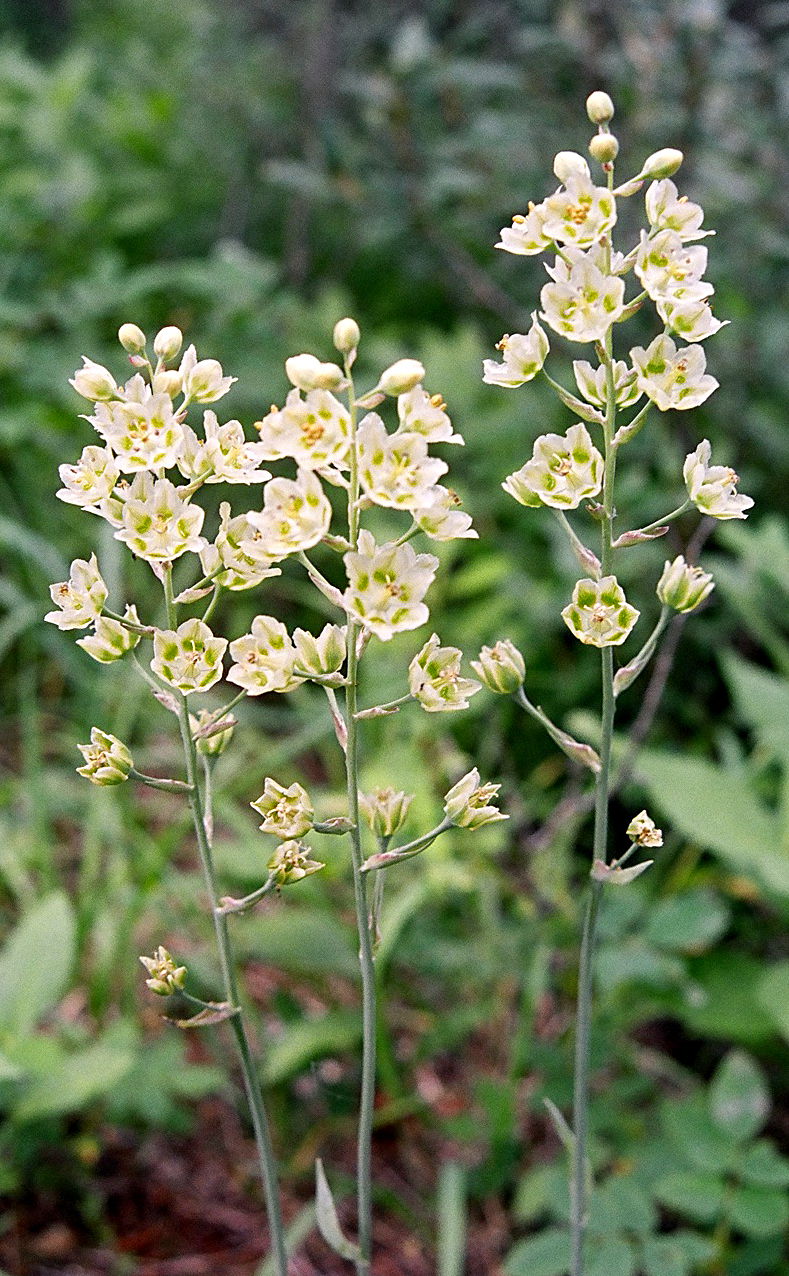
White camus

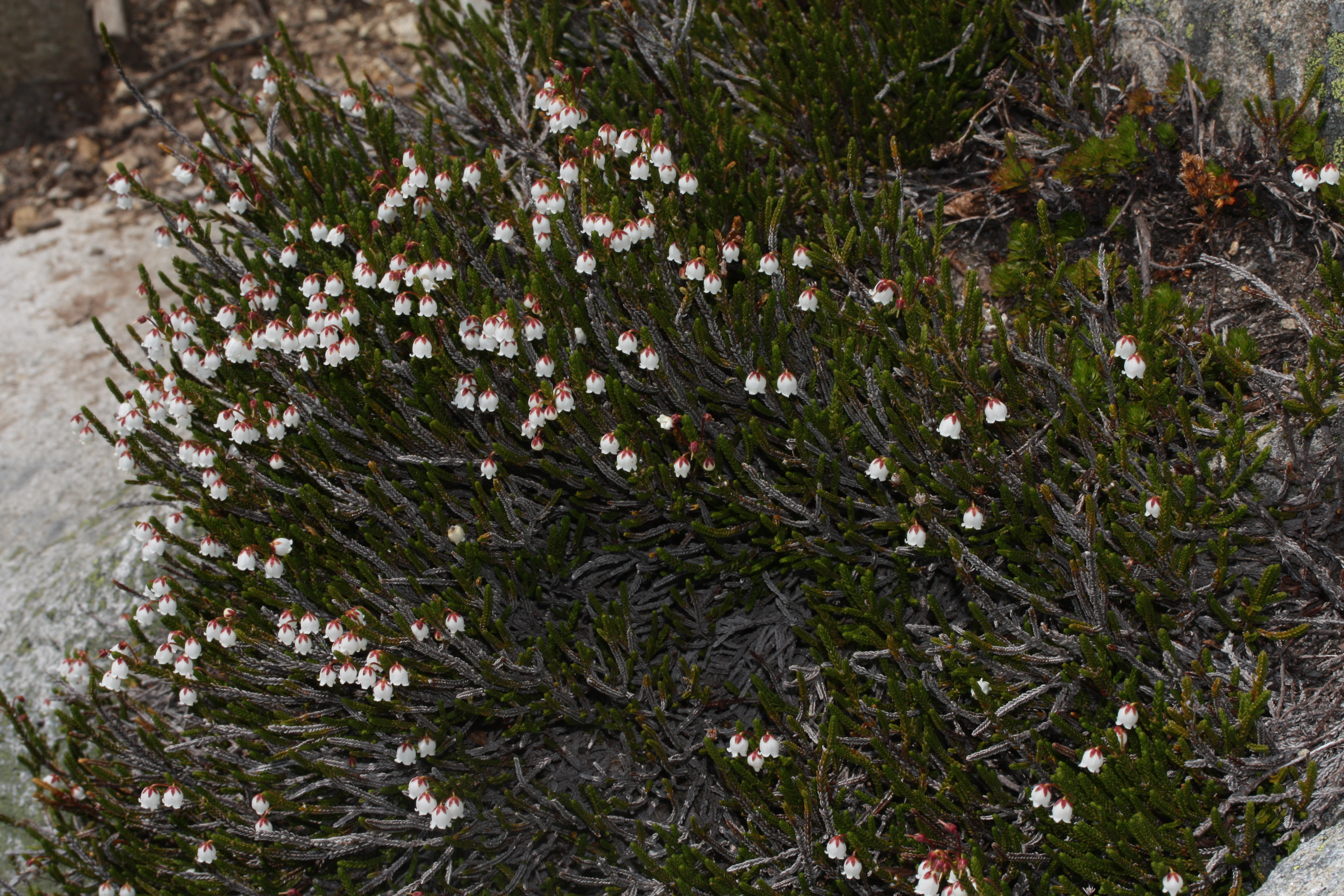
Western moss heather

== Resources ==
- Alberta Wayside Wildflowers - Linda Kershaw (Lone Pine) ISBN 1-55105-350-0
- Handbook of the Canadian Rockies - Ben Gadd (Corax) ISBN 0-9692631-0-4
