= List of Bidens species =

List of species and hybrids currently accepted by Plants of the World Online in the plant genus Bidens.

== List of accepted species ==
As of November 2024, Plants of the World Online accepted the following 219 species. Author citation is included. Synonyms are not included.

- Bidens acrifolia Sherff
- Bidens acuticaulis Sherff
- Bidens aequisquama (Fernald) Sherff.
- Bidens alba (L.) DC.
- Bidens amplectens Sherff
- Bidens amplissima Greene
- Bidens andicola Kunth
- Bidens andongensis Hiern
- Bidens andrei Sherff
- Bidens angustissima Kunth
- Bidens anthemoides Sherff
- Bidens anthriscoides DC.
- Bidens aoraiensis M.L.Grant
- Bidens arenicola Sherff
- Bidens aristosa (Michx.) Britton
- Bidens asperata (Hutch. & Dalziel) Sherff
- Bidens asymmetrica Sherff
- Bidens aurea (Aiton) Sherff
- Bidens balsana Melchert
- Bidens barteri (Oliv. & Hiern) T.G.J.Rayner
- Bidens baumii Sherff
- Bidens beckiana (F.Br.) Sherff
- Bidens beckii Torr. ex Spreng.
- Bidens bicolor Greenm.
- Bidens bidentoides (Nutt.) Britton
- Bidens bigelovii A.Gray
- Bidens bipinnata L.
- Bidens bipontina Sherff
- Bidens biternata (Lour.) Merr. & Sherff
- Bidens blakei (Sherff) Melchert
- Bidens borianiana (Sch.Bip. ex Schweinf.) Cufod.
- Bidens brandegeei Sherff
- Bidens brasiliensis Sherff
- Bidens buchneri Sherff
- Bidens burundiensis M.Tadesse
- Bidens cabopulmensis León de la Luz & B.L.Turner
- Bidens campanulata Bringel & T.B.Cavalc.
- Bidens camporum (Hutch.) Mesfin
- Bidens campylotheca Sch.Bip.
- Bidens carinata Cufod. ex Mesfin
- Bidens cernua L.
- Bidens cervicata Sherff
- Bidens chiapensis Brandegee
- Bidens chippii (M.B.Moss) Mesfin
- Bidens chodatii Hassl.
- Bidens chrysanthemifolia (Kunth) Sherff
- Bidens cinerea Sherff
- Bidens clarendonensis Britton
- Bidens clavata Ballard
- Bidens colimana Melchert
- Bidens conjuncta Sherff
- Bidens connata Muhl. ex Willd.
- Bidens cordifolia Sch.Bip.
- Bidens cordylocarpa (A.Gray) D.J.Crawford
- Bidens cornuta Sherff
- Bidens cosmoides Sherff
- Bidens crocea Welw. ex O.Hoffm.
- Bidens cronquistii (Sherff) Melchert
- Bidens cynapiifolia Kunth
- Bidens deltoidea J.W.Moore
- Bidens discoidea Britton
- Bidens diversa Sherff
- Bidens domingensis O.E.Schulz
- Bidens eatonii Fernald
- Bidens edentula G.M.Barroso
- Bidens ekmanii O.E.Schulz ex Urb.
- Bidens elgonensis (Sherff) Agnew
- Bidens elliotii Sherff
- Bidens engleri O.E.Schulz
- Bidens esmartinezii Villaseñor
- Bidens evapelliana W.L.Wagner, J.R.Clark & Lorence
- Bidens exigua Sherff
- Bidens fischeri (O.Hoffm.) Sherff
- Bidens fistulosa Sch.Bip. ex Baker
- Bidens flabellata O.Hoffm.
- Bidens flagellaris Baker
- Bidens flagellata (Sherff) Mesfin
- Bidens forbesii Sherff
- Bidens frondosa L.
- Bidens gardneri Baker
- Bidens gentryi Sherff
- Bidens ghedoensis Mesfin
- Bidens glandulifera M.L.Grant
- Bidens goiana B.L.Turner
- Bidens gracillima Sherff
- Bidens grantii Sherff
- Bidens graveolens Mart.
- Bidens gypsophila Miranda
- Bidens hassleriana (Chodat) A.A.Sáenz
- Bidens hawaiensis A.Gray
- Bidens hendersonensis Sherff
- Bidens henryi Sherff
- Bidens herzogii (Sherff) D.J.N.Hind
- Bidens heterodoxa Fernald & H.St.John
- Bidens heterosperma A.Gray
- Bidens hildebrandtii O.Hoffm.
- Bidens hillebrandiana (Drake) O.Deg. ex Sherff
- Bidens hintonii (Sherff) Melchert
- Bidens holstii Sherff
- Bidens holwayi Sherff & S.F.Blake
- Bidens hyperborea Greene
- Bidens insolita Sherff
- Bidens isostigmatoides Sherff
- Bidens kamerunensis Sherff
- Bidens kamtschatica Vassilcz.
- Bidens kilimandscharica (O.Hoffm.) Sherff
- Bidens kirkii Sherff
- Bidens laevis (L.) Britton, Sterns & Poggenb.
- Bidens lantanoides A.Gray
- Bidens lejolyana Lisowski
- Bidens lemmonii A.Gray
- Bidens leptocephala Sherff
- Bidens leptophylla C.H.An
- Bidens lineariloba Oliv.
- Bidens longistyla C.R.Hart
- Bidens macrocarpa Sherff
- Bidens macroptera (Sch.Bip. ex Chiov.) Mesfin
- Bidens magnifolia Sherff
- Bidens malawiensis Mesfin
- Bidens mandonii (Sherff) Cabrera
- Bidens mannii T.G.J.Rayner
- Bidens mathewsii Sherff
- Bidens mauiensis Sherff
- Bidens maximowicziana Oett.
- Bidens melchertii B.L.Turner
- Bidens menziesii Sherff
- Bidens mesfinii Anderb.
- Bidens mexicana Sherff
- Bidens meyeri V.A.Funk & K.R.Wood
- Bidens micrantha Gaudich.
- Bidens microcephala W.L.Wagner, J.R.Clark & Lorence
- Bidens microphylla Sherff
- Bidens minensis Sherff
- Bidens mitis Sherff
- Bidens mollifolia Sherff
- Bidens molokaiensis Sherff
- Bidens monticola Poepp.
- Bidens mooreensis M.L.Grant
- Bidens moorei Sherff
- Bidens nana M.O.Dillon
- Bidens negriana (Sherff) Cufod.
- Bidens nobilioides Sherff
- Bidens nudata Brandegee
- Bidens oaxacana Melchert
- Bidens oblonga (Sherff) Wild
- Bidens occidentalis (Hutch. & Dalziel) Mesfin
- Bidens ocellata (Greenm.) Melchert
- Bidens ochracea Sherff
- Bidens odora (Sherff) T.G.J.Rayner
- Bidens oerstediana Sherff
- Bidens oligantha Brandegee
- Bidens oligoflora (Klatt) Wild
- Bidens orofenensis M.L.Grant
- Bidens ostruthioides (DC.) Sch.Bip.
- Bidens pachyloma (Oliv. & Hiern) Cufod.
- Bidens paniculata Hook. & Arn.
- Bidens parviflora Willd.
- Bidens pilosa L.
- Bidens pinnatipartita (O.Hoffm.) Wild
- Bidens polycephala Sch.Bip.
- Bidens polylepis S.F.Blake
- Bidens populifolia Sherff
- Bidens prestinaria (Sch.Bip. ex Walp.) Cufod.
- Bidens pringlei Greenm.
- Bidens pseudalausensis Sherff
- Bidens pseudocosmos Sherff
- Bidens radiata Thuill.
- Bidens raiateensis J.W.Moore
- Bidens reptans G.Don
- Bidens riedelii Baker
- Bidens riparia Kunth
- Bidens rosemaniana B.L.Turner & Melchert
- Bidens rostrata Melchert
- Bidens rubicundula Sherff
- Bidens rubifolia Kunth
- Bidens rueppellii (Sch.Bip. ex Walp.) Sherff
- Bidens ruyigiensis T.G.J.Rayner
- Bidens saint-johniana Sherff
- Bidens saltillensis Melchert
- Bidens sambucifolia Cav.
- Bidens sandvicensis Less.
- Bidens schaffneri (A.Gray) Sherff
- Bidens schimperi Sch.Bip. ex Walp.
- Bidens segetum Mart. ex Colla
- Bidens serboana B.L.Turner
- Bidens serrulata (Poir.) Desf.
- Bidens setigera (Sch.Bip. ex Walp.) Sherff
- Bidens sharpii (Sherff) Melchert
- Bidens shrevei Britton
- Bidens sierra-leonensis Mesfin
- Bidens simplicifolia C.H.Wright
- Bidens societatis J.W.Moore
- Bidens socorrensis Moran & G.A.Levin
- Bidens somaliensis Sherff
- Bidens steppia Sherff
- Bidens steyermarkii Sherff
- Bidens subalternans DC.
- Bidens subspiralis McVaugh
- Bidens taylorii Sherff
- Bidens tenera O.E.Schulz
- Bidens tenuisecta A.Gray
- Bidens ternata (Chiov.) Sherff
- Bidens tetraspinosa Majeed Kak & Javeid
- Bidens torta Sherff
- Bidens trelawniensis Proctor
- Bidens trichosperma (Michx.) Britton
- Bidens tripartita L.
- Bidens triplinervia Kunth
- Bidens uapensis (F.Br.) Sherff
- Bidens ugandensis (S.Moore) Sherff
- Bidens urceolata De Wild.
- Bidens urophylla Sherff
- Bidens valida Sherff
- Bidens vulgata Greene
- Bidens wailele K.R.Wood & Knope
- Bidens whytei Sherff
- Bidens wichmanii W.L.Wagner, J.R.Clark & Lorence
- Bidens wiebkei Sherff
- Bidens woodii W.L.Wagner, J.R.Clark & Lorence
- Bidens xanti (A.Gray) B.L.Turner
- Bidens xilinensis Y.Z.Zhao & L.Q.Zhao
- Bidens zairensis Lisowski
- Bidens zavattarii Cufod.

== List of accepted hybrids ==
As of November 2024, Plants of the World Online accepted four natural hybrids for the genus Bidens.

- Bidens × decipiens Warnst.
- Bidens × garumnae Jeanj. & Debray
- Bidens × multiceps Fassett
- Bidens × polakii Velen.
