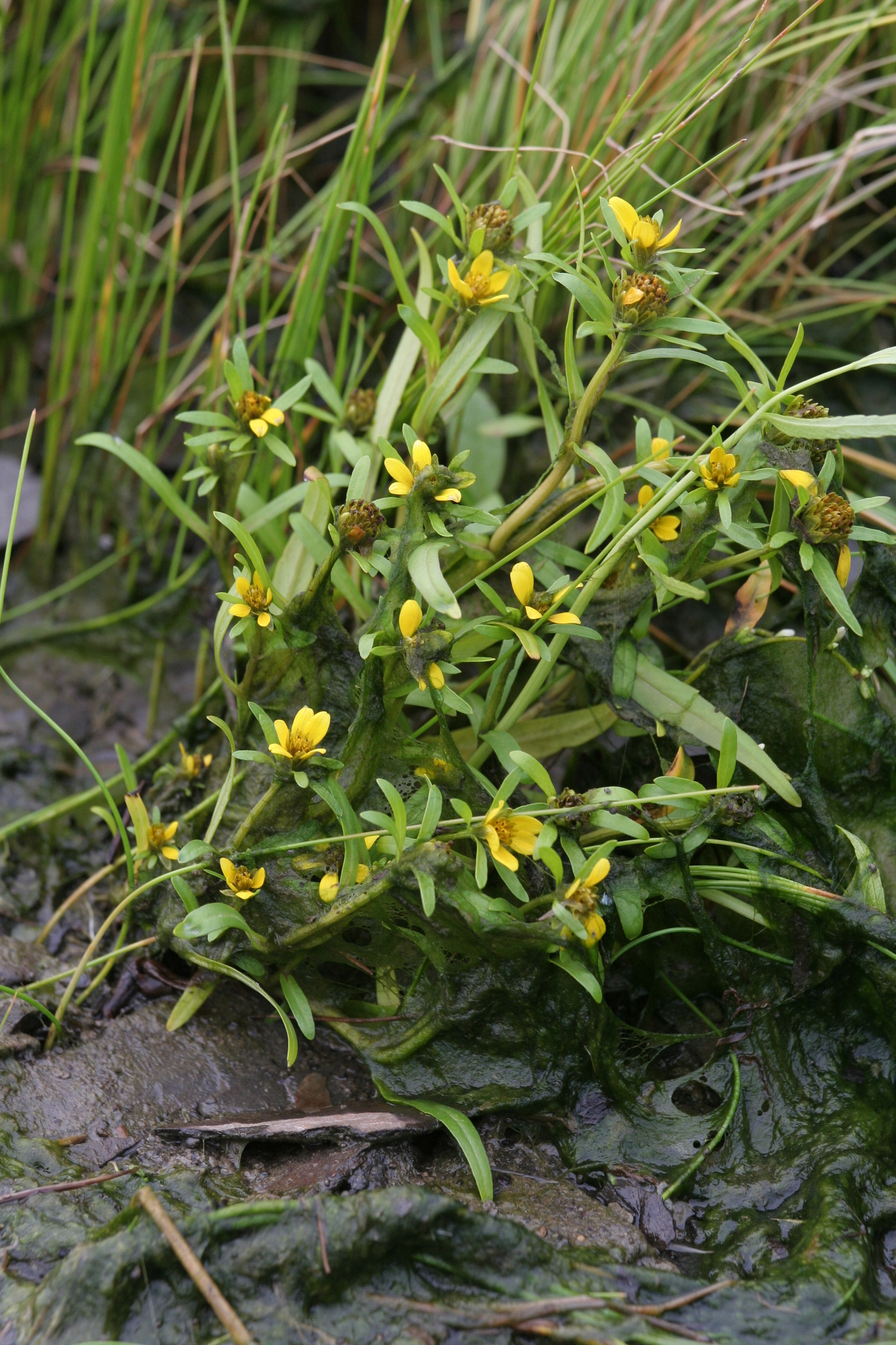

Conservation status
- Apparently Secure (NatureServe)

Scientific classification
- Kingdom: Plantae
- Clade: Embryophytes
- Clade: Tracheophytes
- Clade: Angiosperms
- Clade: Eudicots
- Clade: Asterids
- Order: Asterales
- Family: Asteraceae
- Genus: Bidens
- Species: B. hyperborea

Binomial name
- Bidens hyperborea Greene

Synonyms
- Bidens colpophila Fernald & H.St.John; Bidens hyperborea var. arcuans Fernald; Bidens hyperborea var. cathancensis Fernald; Bidens hyperborea var. colpophila Fernald; Bidens hyperborea var. gaspensis Fernald; Bidens hyperborea var. laurentiana Fassett; Bidens hyperborea var. svensonii Fassett

= Bidens hyperborea =

Species of aquatic plant

Bidens hyperborea is a species of flowering plant in the family Asteraceae commonly known as estuary beggarticks, northern beggarticks, or estuary bur-marigold. Known from marshes and estuarine regions in northeastern North America, it is a variable annual herb with yellow flowers similar to Bidens cernua, Bidens laevis, and Bidens eatonii. B. hyperborea is listed as an endangered species in the state of Massachusetts, where it is threatened by habitat degradation, and is listed by NatureServe as critically imperiled (S1) in the province of Ontario and possibly extirpated from New Hampshire.

== Description ==
Bidens hyperborea is an annual herbaceous plant with highly variable morphology, usually growing 10–30 cm (3.9–11.8 in) tall and occasionally exceeding 70 cm (28 in). The leaves may be sessile or petiolate, with the petioles 5–25 mm (0.20–0.98 in) long and more or less winged. The leaves are oblanceolate to linear in shape, with cuneate bases and margins that may be entire or more or less serrate. The leaf tips may be rounded or obtuse to attenuate. The leaves are usually 15–40 mm (0.59–1.57 in) long by 6–10 mm (0.24–0.39 in) wide, but can rarely exceed over 100 mm (3.9 in) in length.

Like other members of the Asteraceae family, the inflorescence is a capitulum, or head, a structure that superficially resembles a single flower but is actually a compound receptacle aggregating many smaller flowers. These flowers are separated into the inner actinomorphic disc flowers, and the outer ray flowers, zygomorphic flowers that resemble individual petals. The long, flattened parts of the corollas on the ray flowers are the laminae. The fruits of this family are known as cypselae, and have a modified calyx, known as the pappus, attached to them. The receptacle is surrounded by the involucre, a whorl of overlapping bracts called phyllaries. In Bidens, just beneath the involucre is the calyculus, another whorl of bracts, often longer than the phyllaries and more or less leaf-like.

Bidens hyperborea flowers from August to October. The heads are borne erect and solitary or in 2s and 3s on peduncles 10–60 mm (0.39–2.36 in) long. The calyculus consists of 2 to 3, and rarely up to 9 erect bracts. These bracts have an oblanceolate to lance-linear shape, usually with ciliolate margins, are abaxially glabrous, and usually measure 10–20 mm (0.39–0.79 in) long, to rarely over 75 mm (3.0 in) long. The involucre has a more or less campanulate to cylindric, sometimes hemispheric shape and is 7–11 mm (0.28–0.43 in) in diameter. There are usually 6 to 8 (sometimes up to 12) phyllaries, with an oblong shape, a yellow tip, and measuring 6–11 mm (0.24–0.43 in) long.

The heads may lack ray flowers, or have 3 to 7. The laminae of the ray flowers are pale yellow and 4–12 mm (0.16–0.47 in) long. There are 15 to 30 (sometimes up to 60) disc flowers, with yellow, sometimes orange-tipped corollas, 3–4 mm (0.12–0.16 in) long. The cypselae are striated and dark, with a flattened, narrowly cuneate shape. The pappi consist of up to 4 erect awns 2–5 mm (0.079–0.197 in) long. The margins of the fruit and the awns are retrorsely barbed.

Bidens hyperborea may be easily confused with other similar species of Bidens, including some that it grows with. Bidens eatonii has stalked leaves, as opposed to the simple leaves of B. hyperborea. Bidens laevis and Bidens cernua have a broader mature disc (the central part of the head containing the disc flowers), 1.3–2.8 cm (0.51–1.10 in) broad, that are nodding (cernuous) when fruiting, with cypselae (achenes) lacking any conspicuous striation, compared to the smaller mature disc, 1.5 cm (0.59 in) broad, of B. hyperborea, which are also erect when fruiting, with the cypselae covered in 5 to 17 conspicuous striations.

== Taxonomy ==
=== Taxonomic history ===
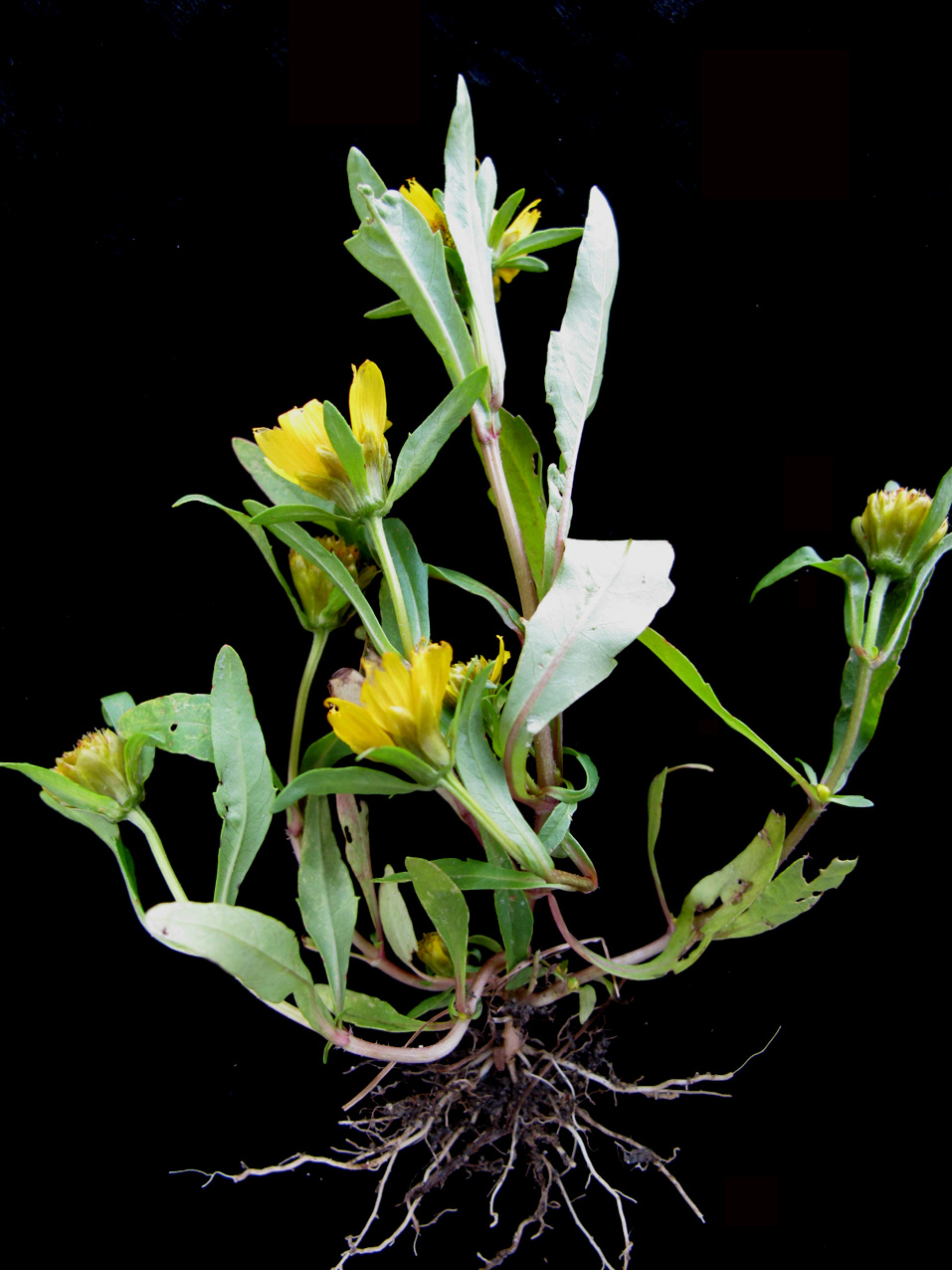
Bidens hyperborea

Bidens hyperborea was first described by Edward Lee Greene in 1901 based on specimens that James Melville Macoun had collected at James Bay, originally identified as Bidens cernua. In 1915, Merritt Lyndon Fernald and Harold St. John described Bidens colpophila from specimens collected near the mouth of the Kennebec River, noting its similarities to Greene's B. hyperborea but distinguishing it based on characteristics of the fruit.

A subsequent 1918 review by Fernald concluded that B. hyperborea and B. colpophila were conspecific, but the variability of the species in numerous isolated localities led to the circumscription of a number of varieties, distinguished by the length of the fruits, leaf morphology, and growth habit. In 1925, Norman Carter Fassett described two new varieties, var. laurentiana and var. svensonii, separating them based on their leaf morphology and phyllaries. Fassett also described an interspecific hybrid of B. hyperborea and B. cernua.

Most authorities currently do not recognize the varieties of B. hyperborea and treat it without subspecific divisions.

=== Etymology ===
The generic name, Bidens, is from the Latin bis (two) and dens (tooth), named after the two-toothed pappus in the type species. The specific epithet hyperborea alludes to belonging to the extreme north or being northern, originally from Greek, after the northern land of Hyperborea in Greek mythology.

== Distribution and habitat ==
Bidens hyperborea is native to northeastern North America. It is found in Canada (Ontario, Quebec, New Brunswick, and Nova Scotia) and the United States (Maine, New Hampshire, and Massachusetts). Fassett proposed that its wide but disjunct and ecologically narrow distribution emerged towards the end of the Last Glacial Period, when freshwater released from the melting ice sheet of eastern North America entered the ocean and produced vast estuarine areas, which slowly retreated and became more saline as the flow diminished, stranding the plants in the remaining suitable habitats.

Bidens hyperborea is found in a diverse number of estuaries and associated intertidal habitats across its range, described by Fassett as "...to be expected on the tidal shores of every fair-sized stream from the Merrimac to the St. Lawrence River..." It does not exhibit much preference for the temperature of the water, as it is found in both warmer waters in its southern range and in the cooler waters of the Hudson Bay.

In Canada, this species is found on the Atlantic and Arctic coast, particularly in the mouths of tributaries that drain into the James Bay and the St. Lawrence River, and along the coast of the Gulf of St. Lawrence to the Northumberland Strait. The populations of B. hyperborea on the rivers entering the Gulf of St. Lawrence from eastern New Brunswick seem to be more tolerant of salinity compared to those in the United States, with the New Brunswick populations growing intermixed with Sagittaria (formerly Lophotocarpus). It is absent from the outer coast of Nova Scotia and the Bay of Fundy, as the respective lack of freshwater flow and great tides create conditions unsuitable for estuaries.

In the United States, B. hyperborea has a more localized distribution, mostly in Maine, where it occurs along the coast at the mouths of rivers like the Kennebec. It is also rarely found in Massachusetts, where it is reported from Essex County and Plymouth County, with only two remaining occurrences. It is historically known from the Merrimack River, and from New Hampshire, where it is likely extirpated. B. hyperborea has been reported from the estuaries of the Hudson River in New York, but recent assessments as of 2014 suggest that these are misidentifications. Fassett identified a historical 1827 collection of Bidens from the Hackensack Meadowlands of New Jersey as B. hyperborea.

== Conservation ==
While the global population of Bidens hyperborea is recognized as Apparently Secure (G4) under the NatureServe conservation status system, and locally in Quebec (S4), the species is endangered or threatened in several localities, and is possibly extirpated in New Hampshire. The Ontario and Massachusetts populations are listed as Critically Imperiled (S1), and the species is listed under the Massachusetts Endangered Species Act as Endangered. The Nova Scotia populations are listed as Imperiled (S2). The New Brunswick and Maine populations are listed as Vulnerable (S3), and the state of Maine recognizes it with a non-legal status as a species of Special Concern (SC).

Bidens hyperborea is threatened by the damming of rivers, filling of marshes, and siltation in its habitat. Other threats facing intertidal plants in general include excessive nutrients from pollution, competition from invasive species, dredging, and erosion from ship-induced waves. Because intertidal plants are narrow specialists adapted to extreme conditions, they also serve as a sensitive indicator of ecosystem health.
