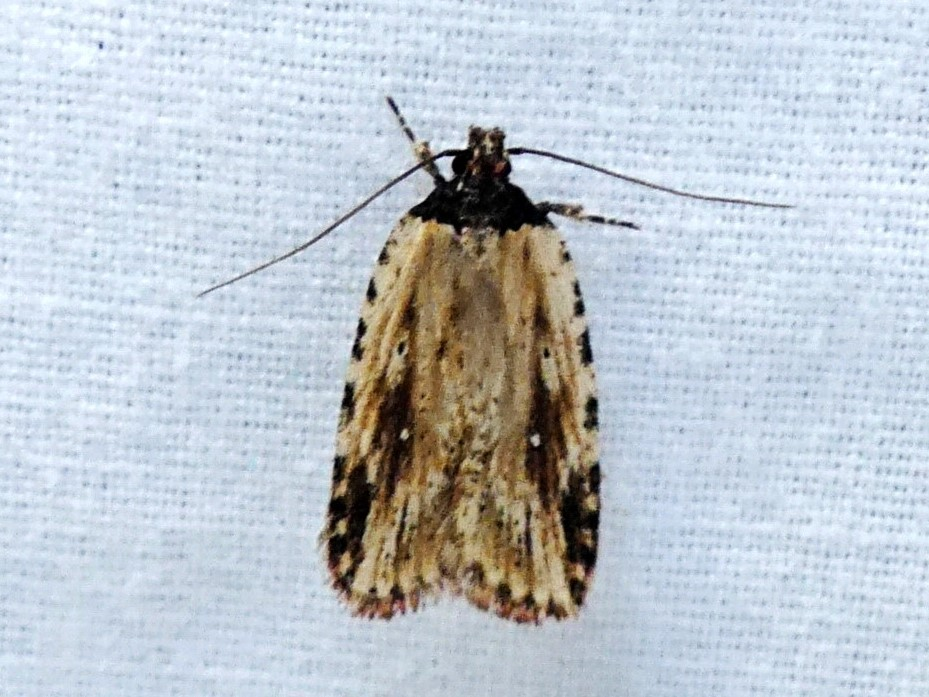

Scientific classification
- Kingdom: Animalia
- Phylum: Arthropoda
- Clade: Pancrustacea
- Class: Insecta
- Order: Lepidoptera
- Family: Depressariidae
- Genus: Agonopterix
- Species: A. atrodorsella

Binomial name
- Agonopterix atrodorsella (Clemens, 1863)

Synonyms
- Depressaria atrodorsella Clemens, 1863

= Agonopterix atrodorsella =

Species of moth

Agonopterix atrodorsella is a species of moth in the family Depressariidae. It was first described by James Brackenridge Clemens in 1863. It is found in North America, where it has been recorded from Illinois, Indiana, Kentucky, Maine, Maryland, Massachusetts, Michigan, New Brunswick, New Hampshire, New York, North Carolina, Ohio, Ontario, Quebec and Wisconsin.

== Description ==
The wingspan is 18–23 mm. The forewings are yellow ochreous with several black costal dots from the base to the tip of the wing. There is a black dot on the basal portion of the disc with a rufous patch beyond this. The hindwings are yellowish. Adults have been recorded in all months of the year depending on the collection locality. There is however only one generation per year.

== Behaviour and ecology ==
The larvae feed on Eupatorium and Coreopsis species, as well as Bidens frondosa and Myrica asplenifolia. The species overwinters as an adult.
