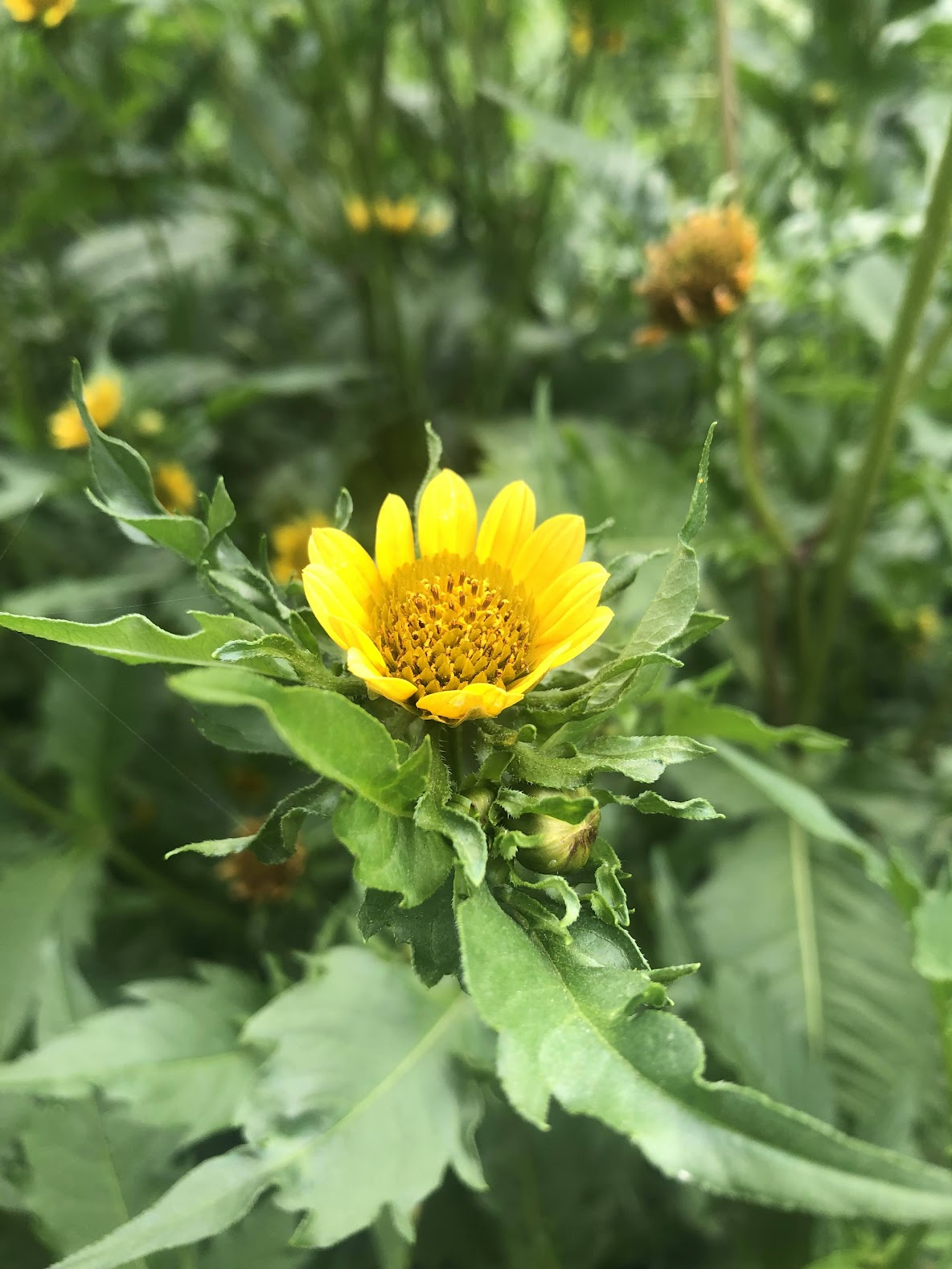

Conservation status
- Special Concern (COSEWIC)

Scientific classification
- Kingdom: Plantae
- Clade: Tracheophytes
- Clade: Angiosperms
- Clade: Eudicots
- Clade: Asterids
- Order: Asterales
- Family: Asteraceae
- Genus: Bidens
- Species: B. amplissima

Binomial name
- Bidens amplissima Greene

Synonyms
- Bidens cernua var. elata Torr. & A.Gray; Bidens elata (Torr. & A.Gray) Sherff

= Bidens amplissima =

Species in the Asteraceae family

Bidens amplissima, also known as the Vancouver Island beggarticks, is a wetland annual species in the sunflower family, Asteraceae that is listed as Special Concern in Canada and has a limited global range. More than 85% of known populations occur in southwestern British Columbia, with the remainder in northwestern Washington. Bidens amplissima occurs across a remarkable range of environmental conditions, both along the edges of freshwater ponds and under saline conditions in estuaries. Bidens amplissima displays a broad range of morphological variation and overlaps in morphological characteristics with two closely related and occurring species, B. cernua and B. tripartita.

== Description ==
Bidens amplissima resembles small sunflowers, with many small disk florets in the center and 6-11 yellow ray florets around the margin of the head. Stems and inflorescences are often hairy, achenes are wedge-shaped with 2-4 retrorsed barbed awns. Leaves are coarsely toothed along the margin, often widest at the base and becoming narrow toward the tip and the petiole, when present, is often winged-margined. The leaves of B. amplissima display considerable variation in shape.

Most published descriptions of B. amplissima suggest that plants have at least some three-lobed, or tripartite, leaves. However, un-lobed or two-lobed individuals have often been observed. Authors have noted that individuals of B. amplissima often lack the tripartite leaves that have generally been used to identify the species. Many botanists have misidentified these unlobed individuals as the common species B. cernua, which is widespread across most of North America and Europe. Following this observation, an examination of herbarium material was undertaken to investigate the possibility of misidentified specimens. This investigation resulted in the discovery of 5 specimens from WA that were previously named B. cernua and were later determined to be B. amplissima. These included historic collections from as far south as Seattle, and more recent collections near Bellingham, WA. Prior to this discovery, B. amplissima was thought to be endemic to southwestern BC.

== Distribution and abundance ==
Bidens amplissima has a limited global range. More than 85% of known populations occur in southwestern British Columbia, with the remainder in northwestern Washington.

The number of previously documented populations that are currently extant is uncertain. When populations were last systematically surveyed in 2012, 21 of 59 previously documented populations in British Columbia were confirmed as extirpated. Between 2022 and 2024, 21 extant populations of B. amplissima were confirmed, including 6 newly discovered populations not previously documented in British Columbia.

== Habitat ==
Bidens amplissima is a wetland annual occurring across a remarkable range of environmental conditions, both along the edges of freshwater ponds and under saline conditions in estuaries. The species is generally limited to a narrow band of habitat around pond, lake and stream margins. Bidens amplissima often occurs in sites where waterfowl are common, and shows a distinct preference for silty alluvial soils.

== Taxonomy ==
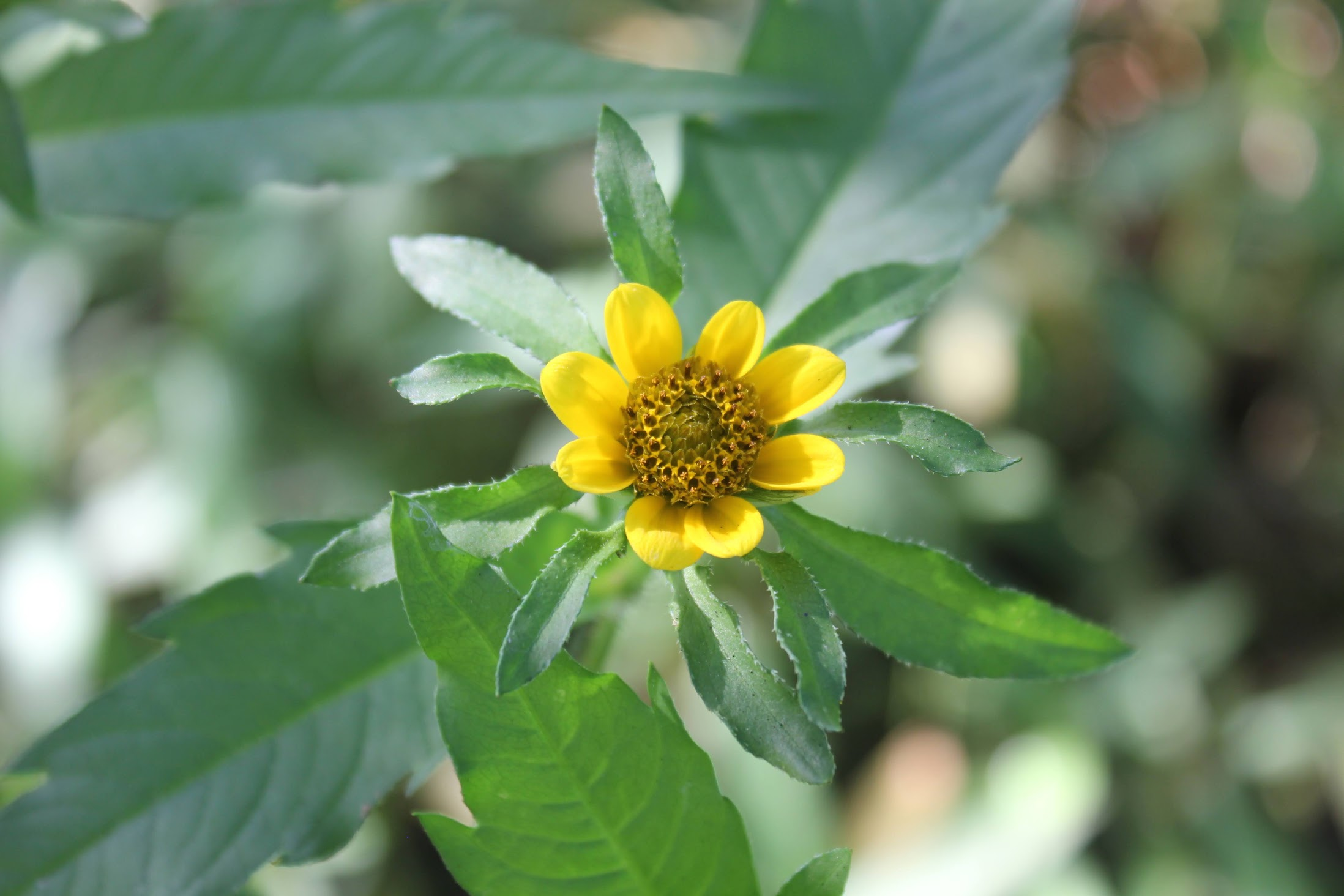
Mature flowering plant of Bidens amplissima

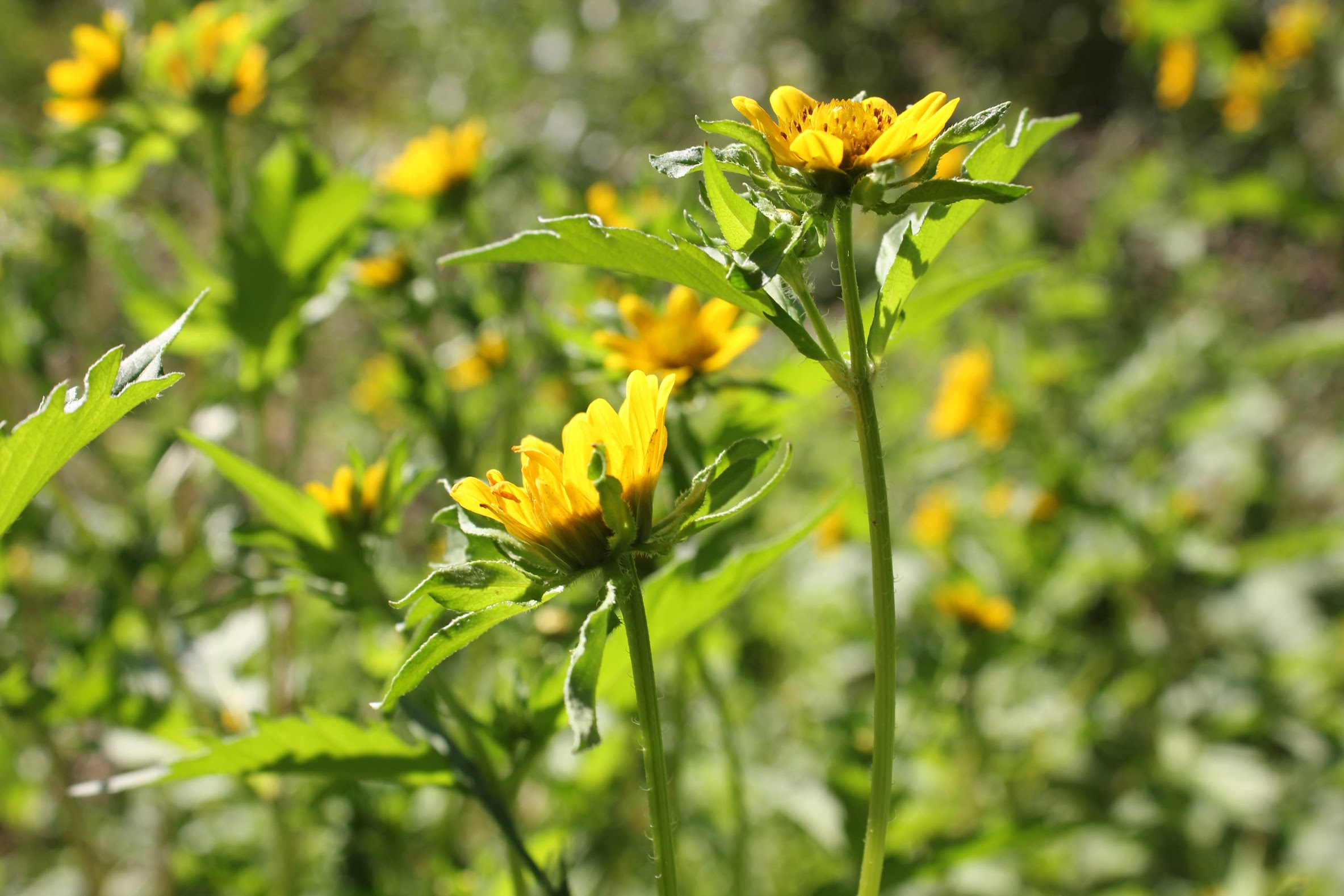
Mature flowering plant of Bidens amplissima

Bidens amplissima is often confused with two closely related and o-coccurring species, B. cernua and B. tripartita. Bidens cernua has yellow rays, achenes are wedge-shaped with retrorsed barbed awns, and simple unlobed leaves that are often roughly the same width along the entire length and lack a petiole. In contrast, B. tripartita is characterized by small rayless heads, achenes are wedge-shaped with retrorsed barbed awns, and leaves that are tripartite. However, un-lobed or two-lobed individuals have often been observed.

== Mating system ==
The mating system of B. amplissima is not well known. However, the species is known to be capable of self-pollination.

== Conservation status ==
Bidens amplissima is Federally listed as a species of Special Concern under Canada's Species at Risk Act. Given that most of its geographic range is in southwestern British Columbia, conservation and management within the province is crucial to the longevity of the species.
