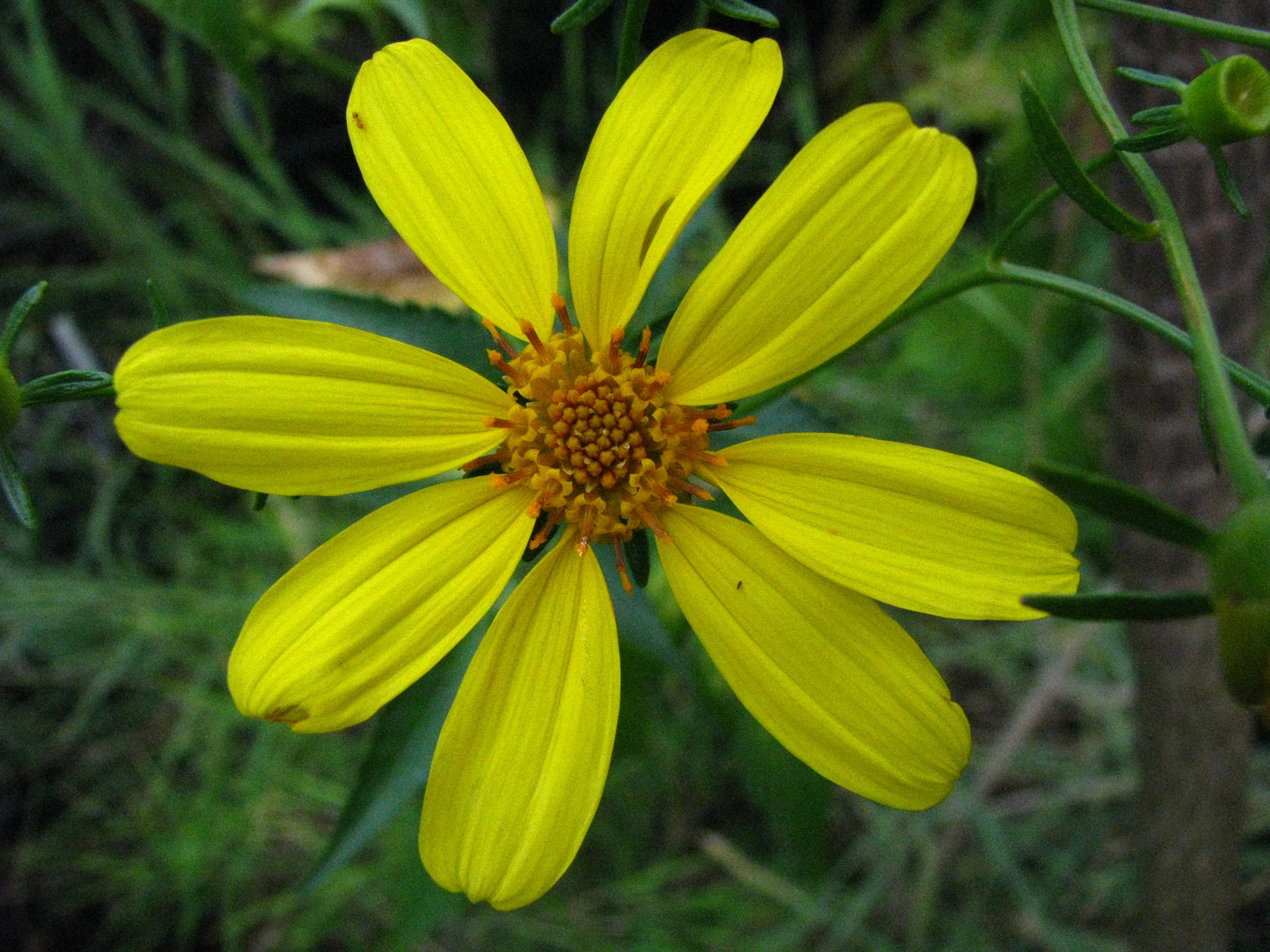

Conservation status
- Vulnerable (IUCN 3.1)

- Endangered (ESA)

Scientific classification
- Kingdom: Plantae
- Clade: Embryophytes
- Clade: Tracheophytes
- Clade: Spermatophytes
- Clade: Angiosperms
- Clade: Eudicots
- Clade: Asterids
- Order: Asterales
- Family: Asteraceae
- Genus: Bidens
- Species: B. amplectens

Binomial name
- Bidens amplectens Sherff
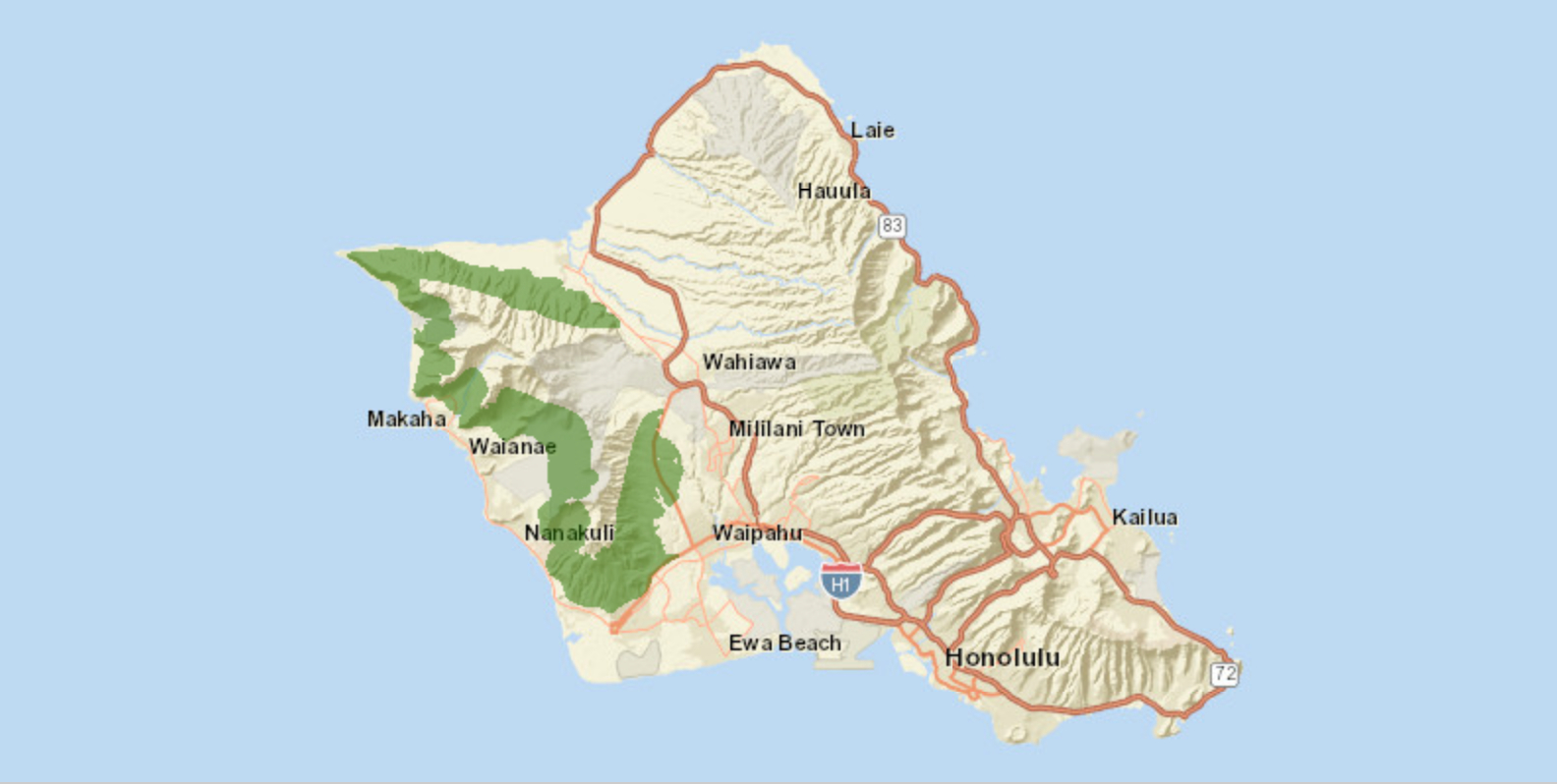

= Bidens amplectens =

Species of flowering plant

Bidens amplectens, the Waiʻanae kokoʻolau, is a species of flowering plant in the family Asteraceae. It belongs to the genus Bidens, collectively called kokoʻolau or koʻokoʻolau in the Hawaiian language. It is found in coastal and dry lowland habitats in the Waiʻanae Range on Oʻahu. It is threatened by habitat loss due to the spread of invasive weeds and brush fires. The species is also threatened by climate change and habitat degradation, and herbivory. Bidens amplectens is currently listed as endangered under the Endangered Species Act.

== General description ==
Bidens amplectens is a member of the sunflower family (Asteraceae). It is an herb with branched stems, from 1.5 to 3 m (5 to 10 ft) tall. It has sparsely pubescent leaves that are pinnately compound, 9 to 15 cm (14 to 22 in) long with 3 to 5 leaflets. Cymes with lateral branches have 10 to 30 flower heads. Ray florets are yellow, 7 to 9 per head, and disk florets are 40 to 60 per head with yellow corollas. Achenes (dry fruit) are gray, straight, wingless, 5 to 8 mm (0.2 to 0.3 in) long and 1 mm (0.04 in) wide, sparsely setose (bristly) on margins and faces.

== Life history ==
Bidens amplectens is a short-lived annual or perennial dicot herb. This species' lifespan is between 1 and 10 years. Little is known about the life history of Bidens amplectens. Flowering was observed in April, May, October, and November. Bidens amplectens' pollination vectors, seed dispersal agents, specific environmental requirements, and limiting factors are unknown. Bidens amplectens is known to hybridize with Bidens torta, another flower native to O'ahu.

== Ecology ==
=== Diet ===
Bidens amplectens is a photosynthetic autotroph.

=== Pollinators ===
Features of the Bidens genus’ flowers indicate pollination by birds, however, this has not been observed in nature.

=== Habitat ===
The habitat for Bidens amplectens includes cliffs and talus slopes in lowland dry shrubland on the windward side of the Waiʻanae mountains. This species was noted as present in 2012 in coastal and lowland dry habitats.

The coastal ecosystem on O'ahu includes mixed herblands, shrublands, and grasslands, from sea level to 980 ft (300 m) in elevation. It is generally within a zone above the influence of waves to within 330 ft (100 m) inland. The coastal vegetation zone is typically dry, with annual rainfall of less than 20 in (50 cm). Windward rainfall may be higher. Biological diversity is low to moderate in this ecosystem. It may include some specialized plants and animals.

The lowland dry ecosystem includes shrublands and forests generally below 3,300 ft (1,000 m) elevation. This system receives less than 50 in (130 cm) annual rainfall, with mostly dry substrate. On O'ahu, this ecosystem is typically found on the leeward side of the Wai'anae Mountains, and the leeward southern coast, including Diamond Head Crater. Biological diversity is low to moderate in this ecosystem.

=== Range ===
Bidens amplectens is native to O'ahu. Plant growth occurs on windward cliffs and crests along the northern portion of the Waianae Mountains on the island. The species is present in the coastal and lowland dry ecosystems, at elevations between 300 and 1,400 ft (90 and 430 m). Bidens amplectens is involved in hybrid swarms near Kaena Point to Makua Valley with Bidens torta. The entirety of the species is restricted to the island of O'ahu.

== Conservation ==
=== Population size ===
There are currently 10 populations of Bidens amplectens totaling fewer than 500 individuals. Historically, this species was fairly common. In 2003, the widespread population was estimated to total fewer than 1,000 individuals. Last recorded, there are about 10 populations of Bidens amplectens. Seven of these populations in similar locations have numbers ranging from 10 individuals to more than 100 individuals. Three populations were observed elsewhere, numbered between 25 and 56 individuals.

=== Past and current geographical distribution ===
Historically Bidens amplectens ranged from Puʻupueo to Makaleha along the northwestern side of the Waiʻanae mountains on Oʻahu. Currently, there are about 10 populations at slightly higher elevations on the windward slopes. Bidens amplectens hybridizes and intergrades with Bidens torta from near Kaʻena Point to the head of Mākua Valley on the summit ridges of the Waiʻanae mountains. Pure Bidens amplectens is restricted to the windward cliffs and crests.

=== Major threats ===
Habitat modification and destruction by invasive introduced plants negatively affects Bidens amplectens at all locations in the Waiʻanae mountains. Fire is noted as a threat to Bidens amplectens, as well as its vulnerability to climate change. Predation and herbivory by feral pigs, goats, and rodents were reported to be a threat to Bidens amplectens. The additional threat hybridization with Bidens torta can result in loss of species diversity, local adaptations, and genetic representation.

==== Fire ====
Fire kills Bidens amplectens plants and seeds. Fires also have the potential to allow nonnative species to become established. The nonnative species that invade after fires tend to be ideal fuel for further fires. Additionally, these nonnative species can outcompete native species like Bidens amplectens.

==== Hurricanes ====
Due to the low number and small range of Bidens amplectens, hurricanes are a big threat. Hurricanes can cause destruction of plants and habitats. Extreme weather, like hurricanes, can damage or destroy Bidens amplectens plants and seeds. Hurricanes also destroy other vegetation, creating new gaps in forest canopies. The change in sunlight is a disturbance that can allow nonnative species to invade.

==== Invasive species ====
Since their introduction by humans to Hawaii, feral pigs and goats have become major threats to native plants. Feral pigs and livestock goats may eat Bidens amplectens. Additionally, they can damage or kill Bidens amplectens through rooting or trampling. When pigs root in the dirt, they disturb soil, and when they defecate, they fertilize soil. Pigs often carry nonnative plants on their hooves and coats, as well as in their feces. This creates opportunities for nonnative plants to invade. Nonnative feral goats pressure these native plants through foraging and movement through vegetation.

=== Listing under the Endangered Species Act ===
Bidens amplectens was first listed as a candidate for protection under the Endangered Species Act as threatened in 2004. The final rule for the species listed it as endangered under the ESA in September 2012, along with 22 other species on O'ahu. At listing, critical habitat was established for the plant in two habitat types (1,508 ac, 607 ha). The species' status has not been revised since listing.

=== 5-Year review ===
The first 5-year review for Bidens amplectens was initiated in October 2018. The plant was originally listed as endangered with a priority number 2. The recovery priority number is based on the high degree of threat and a high potential for recovery with threats that are well understood and can be alleviated. Bidens amplectens remains in danger of extinction throughout its range. The Hawaii Division of Forestry and Wildlife (DOFAW) monitors Bidens amplectens. Previously, outplanting has been attempted with more than 400 individuals, and efforts are ongoing. Currently there is a lack of information on the success of outplanted populations. There are seeds and propagules in collections for this species available for continued research and outplanting attempts. The reviewing party suggests additional management actions are needed to conserve this species in the future.

=== Species Status Assessment ===
Not available for this species.

=== Recovery plan ===
The draft recovery plan for Bidens amplectens is in preparation. Even without a recovery plan, critical habitat has been established. Four units of coastal habitat and 5 units of lowland dry habitat are listed as critical habitat for Bidens amplectens.

The Hawaiʻi and Pacific Plants Recovery Coordinating Committee (HPPRCC) has outlined actions and goals for stages leading towards recovery. The first step in recovering the species is to prevent extinction. To do this, the plant must be managed to control threats, such as fencing. It must also have 50 individuals from each of three populations secured off-site, such as a nursery or seed bank collection. In addition, at least three populations should be documented on Oʻahu where Bidens amplectens now occur or occurred historically. Each of these populations must be naturally reproducing and increasing in number. There must be at least 100 mature, reproducing individuals per population. This recovery objective has not been met. The following recovery stages’ (Interim, Downlisting, and Delisting) objectives have not been met.

==== Recommendations for future actions ====
There are recommended actions for each threat against Bidens amplectens. Authorities should continue to survey for Bidens amplectens in historical locations and potentially suitable habitats. Suitable habitat may be affected in the future by climate change which must be accounted for. There is a need for control of harmful nonnative invasive plants that compete with Bidens amplectens. As fire is a major threat, conservationists must develop and put in place fire prevention management plans. As herbivory is another major threat, exclosures or strategic fencing at all populations of Bidens amplectens should be constructed. Similarly, implementation of effective control methods for rats is necessary. For preservation of this species, collection of seeds for storage and propagation efforts is highly important. These seeds can be used for maintenance and reintroduction. There is a high need to start planning and contribute to enacting ecosystem-level restoration and management for this species.

There is an interim recovery outline for the island of O'ahu that includes Bidens amplectens and all other endemic species. The outline is provided by the US Fish and Wildlife Service. The recovery outline suggests many of the actions listed by the HPPRCC plan. It lists many recovery efforts in place on the island, though most are small or underfunded. The Final Recovery Plan for O'ahu and Multi-Island listing is intended to be in place in 2026.
