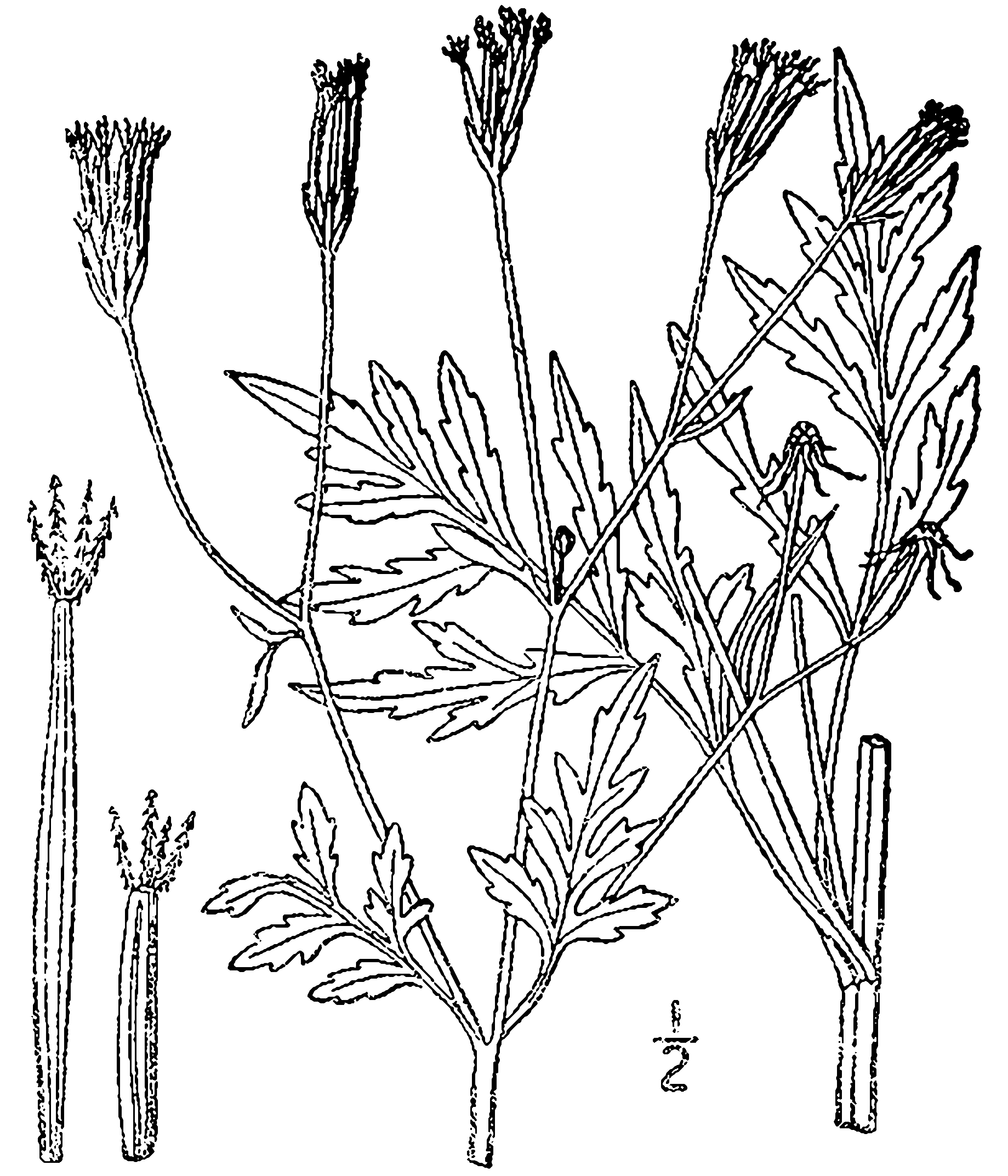
- 1913 illustration

Scientific classification
- Kingdom: Plantae
- Clade: Tracheophytes
- Clade: Angiosperms
- Clade: Eudicots
- Clade: Asterids
- Order: Asterales
- Family: Asteraceae
- Genus: Bidens
- Species: B. bipinnata

Binomial name
- Bidens bipinnata L. 1753

Synonyms
- Bidens cicutifolia Tausch; Bidens cicutaefolia Tausch; Bidens decomposita Wall. ex DC.; Bidens elongata Tausch; Bidens fervida Hort. ex Colla; Bidens myrrhidifolia Tausch; Bidens wallichii DC.; Kerneria bipinnata (L.) Gren. & Godr.

= Bidens bipinnata =

Species of flowering plant

Bidens bipinnata is a common and widespread species of flowering plant in the family Asteraceae.

== Distribution ==
Its native range remains uncertain due to its global distribution, however prevailing thought places its origin in Asia and North America. It is most commonly called by the common name Spanish needles.

== Description ==
Bidens bipinnata is an annual herb up to 150 cm (60 inches) tall. It produces white or yellow flower heads each containing both disc florets and ray florets. The species grows in fields, forests, and disturbed sites such as road embankments and fallow agricultural areas.

=== Habitat ===
B. pinnata tends to be a weedy, ruderal species. It prefers moist, sandy soils and shaded environments.

== Uses ==
B. pinnata can be used as a potherb.

== Gallery ==
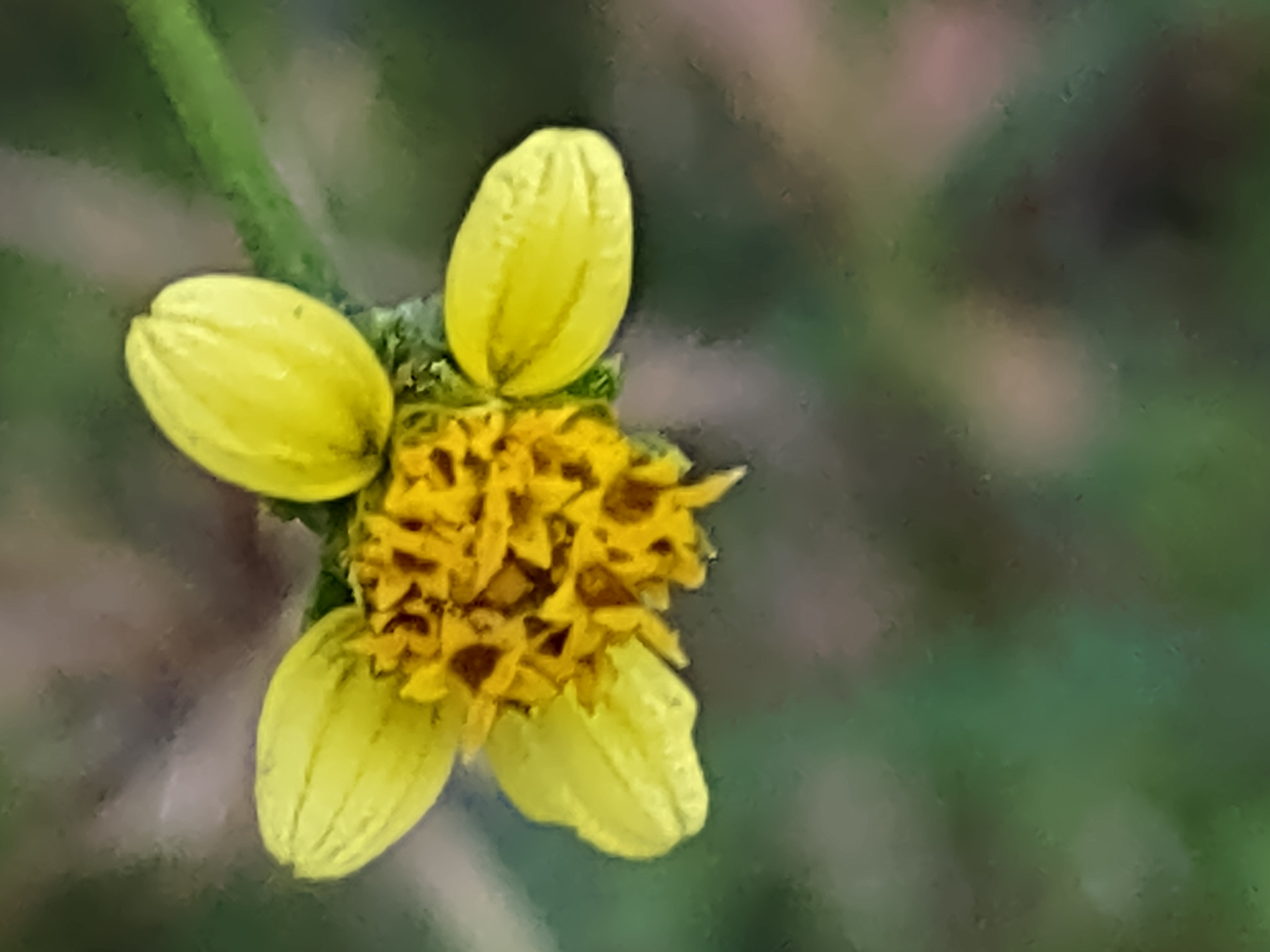
A yellow B. bipinnata flower blooming in mid-October in Texas.

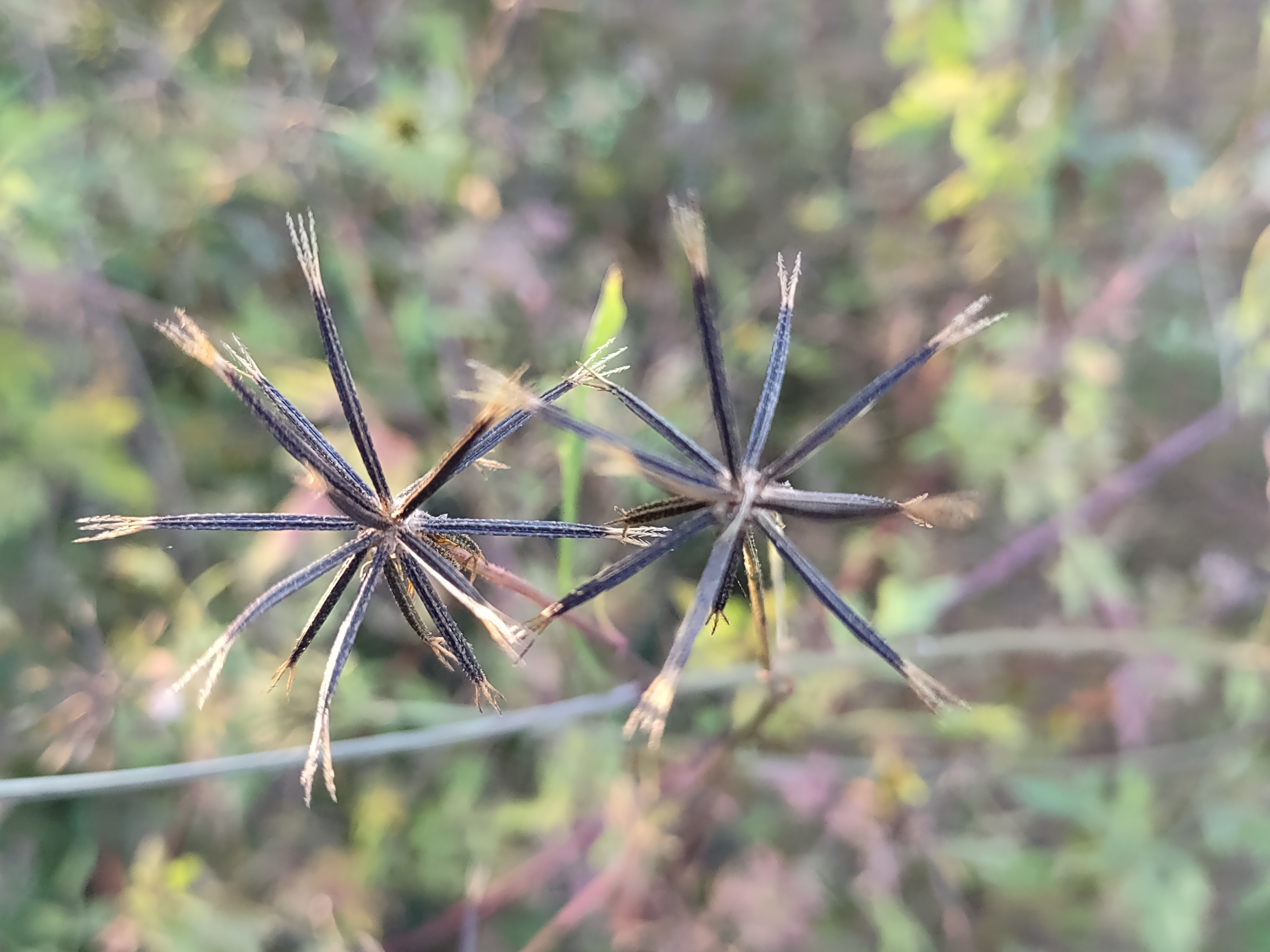
Needle-like seeds, hence the name "Spanish Needle". Each bearing three to four barbed spikes to facilitate propagation.

== See also ==
- bidens tripartita
