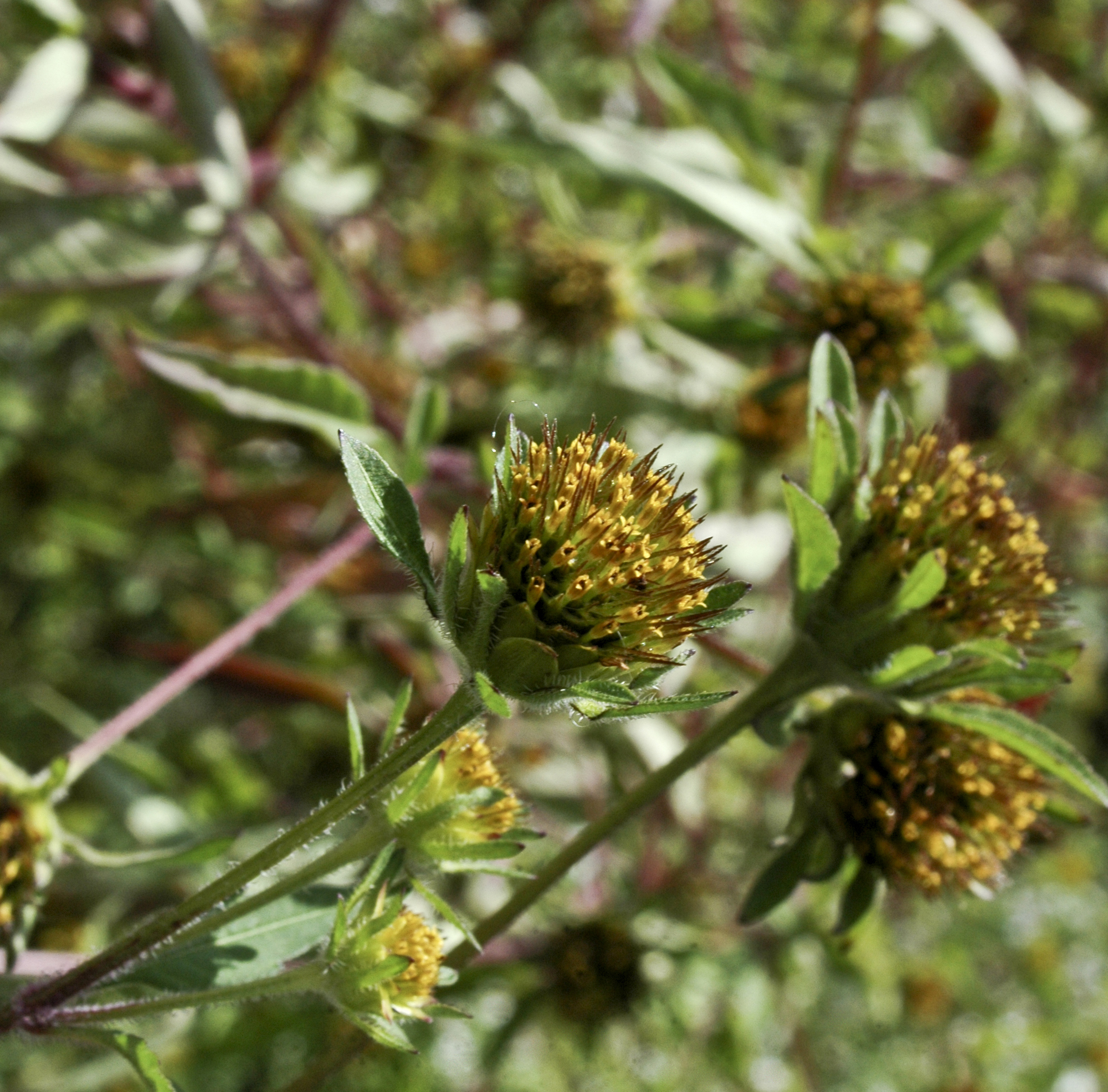

Conservation status
- Secure (NatureServe)

Scientific classification
- Kingdom: Plantae
- Clade: Tracheophytes
- Clade: Angiosperms
- Clade: Eudicots
- Clade: Asterids
- Order: Asterales
- Family: Asteraceae
- Genus: Bidens
- Species: B. frondosa

Binomial name
- Bidens frondosa L.

Synonyms
- List: Bidens frondosa var. anomala Porter ex Fernald; Bidens frondosa f. anomala (Porter ex Fernald) Fernald; Bidens frondosa var. caudata Sherff; Bidens frondosa var. major Hook.; Bidens frondosa var. minor Hook.; Bidens frondosa var. pallida (Wiegand) Wiegand; Bidens frondosa var. stenodonta Fernald & H.St.John; Bidens melanocarpa Wiegand; Bidens melanocarpa var. pallida Wiegand

= Bidens frondosa =

North American species of flowering plant

Bidens frondosa is a species of flowering plant in the family Asteraceae. It is an annual herb widespread across much of Canada and the United States. It is known in many other parts of the world as an introduced species, including Europe, Asia, Morocco, and New Zealand. Its many common names include devil's beggarticks, devil's-pitchfork, devil's bootjack, sticktights, bur marigold, pitchfork weed, tickseed sunflower, leafy beggarticks, and common beggar-ticks.

== Description ==
Bidens frondosa is an annual herb, usually growing to 20–60 cm (8–24 in) tall, but it may reach 1.8 m (6 ft). The stems are square in cross-section and may branch near the top. The leaves are pinnate, divided into a few toothed triangular or lance-shaped leaflets usually 6–8 cm (2 1/2–3 in) long, exceptionally up to 12 cm (4 1/2 in). The inflorescence is often a solitary flower head, but there may be pairs or arrays of several heads. The head contains many orange disc florets. Most flower heads lack ray florets but some may have a few small yellow rays. The fruit is a flat black or brown barbed cypsela up to a centimeter long which has two obvious hornlike pappi at one end.

The barbed pappi on the fruit help it stick to animals, facilitating seed dispersal.

== Distribution and habitat ==
Bidens frondosa is native to northern North America. It is recorded as naturally occurring in the whole of the contiguous United States and Alaska, but not Montana, as well as all of Canada except for the three Arctic territories and Labrador. It does not naturally occur south to Mexico, but it is recorded by CABI as introduced there.

Bidens frondosa has been widely introduced outside of North America, mostly in regions with temperate climates. Most of these introductions have been intentional, because of the purported medicinal, herbal, and decorative properties of the species. In Italy, it was first introduced there in the 1700s as an ornamental plant, and was first reported as a naturalised weed in 1849. It is widespread across Europe, where it has been reported from almost every country except for Finland, Sweden, and Greece. In Asia, it has been reported from the Middle East (Iran, Lebanon, Syria, Turkey), the Caucasus, Central Asia and Western Siberia, China, Korea, Japan, and the Russian Far East. It has also been introduced to New Zealand and Morocco.

Bidens frondosa grows best where there is ample soil moisture and sun, especially in areas where something has disrupted the existing plant community leaving bare ground. It can survive in water saturated soils, frequently found growing at the water's edge, in drainage ditches or on flood plains.

== Ecology ==
The defoliating caterpillar of Hadjina chinensis, which is limited to Bidens species, has been observed on this plant.

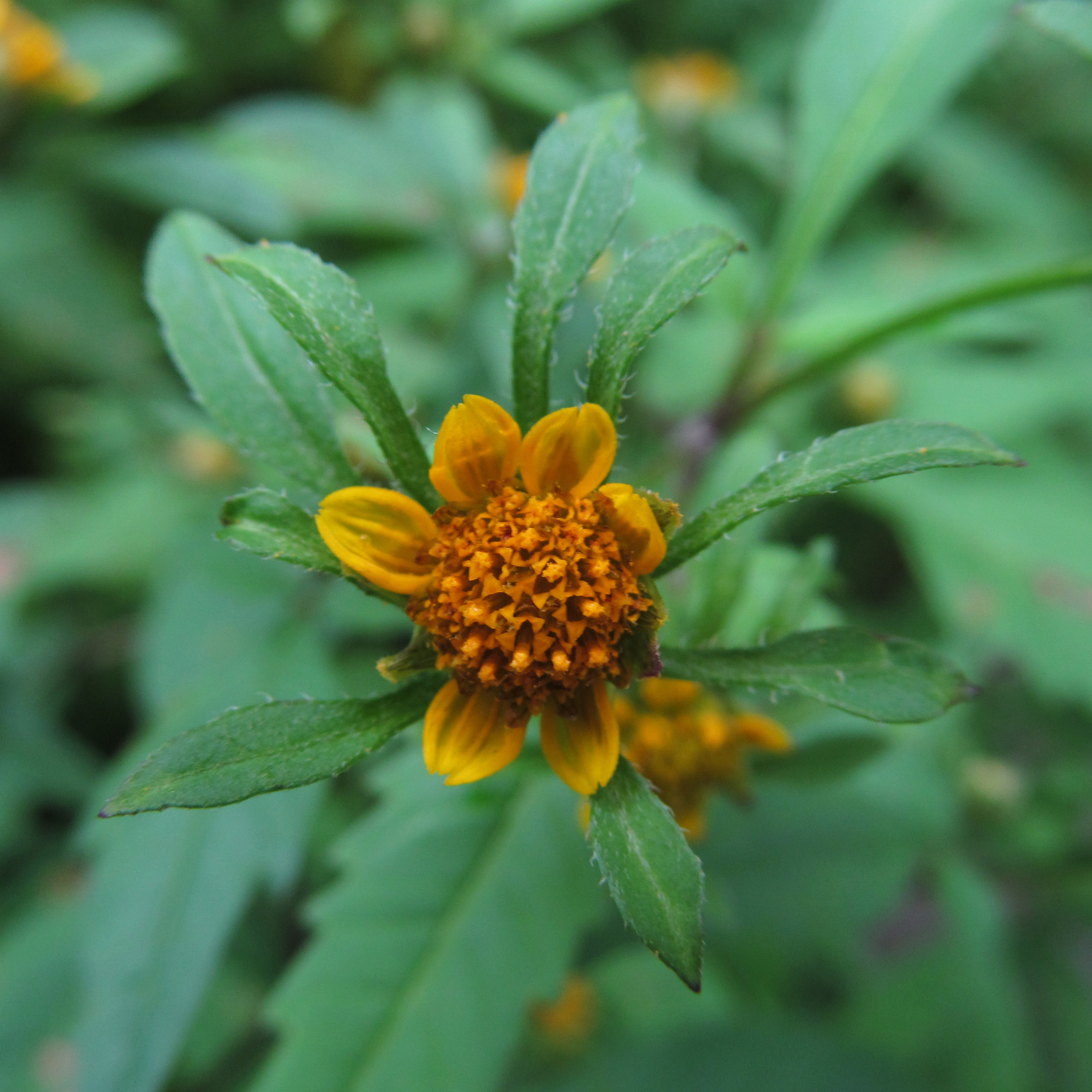
Bidens frondosa flowering head

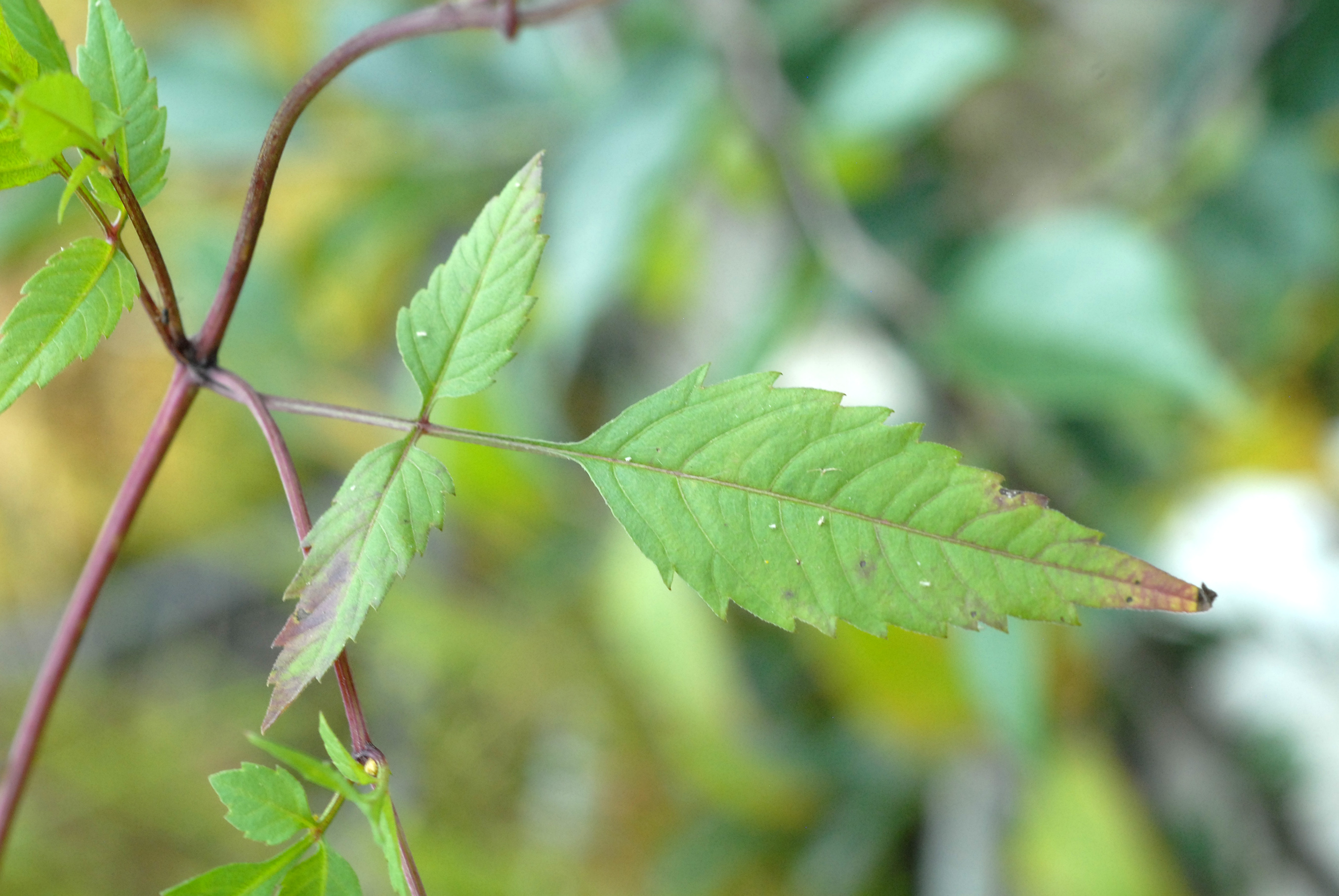
Bidens frondosa leaf

=== Invasiveness ===
This plant is invasive in some parts of the world. It is also weedy in its native range, occurring in pastures and fields and along roadsides. In New Zealand it is classed as an environmental weed by the Department of Conservation.

Across Eurasia, this species is a problematic environmental and agricultural weed that threatens native species of Bidens through competition and genetic pollution. Populations of the native Bidens tripartita and Bidens radiata have been recorded as declining and disappearing in the presence of the alien B. frondosa, which can also interbreed with these species, replacing them with hybrids. Studies comparing B. frondosa with B. tripartita and B. radiata in the Middle Urals show that B. frondosa plants have larger sizes, higher seed production, and greater biomass, indicating their high competitive ability. In Italy, where it is a rapidly spreading agricultural weed in the Po Valley, studies of the phenology of B. frondosa with B. tripartita suggest that its invasive capacity could be related to the length of its vegetative phase, allowing it to be more adaptable and permitting greater growth by delaying reproductive development. A comparison of the two species in China also suggests that B. frondosa has a higher phenotypic plasticity in response to water and nitrogen addition relative to B. tripartita, and that future increases in precipitation in China and atmospheric nitrogen deposition will increase its invasiveness.
