= Bidens acuticaulis =

Scientific classification
- Kingdom: Plantae
- Clade: Tracheophytes
- Clade: Angiosperms
- Clade: Eudicots
- Clade: Asterids
- Order: Asterales
- Family: Asteraceae
- Genus: Bidens
- Species: B. acuticaulis

Binomial name
- Bidens acuticaulis Sherff

Varieties
- Bidens acuticaulis var. acuticaulis Autonym; Bidens aculticaulis var. filirostris (P.Taylor) T.G.J.Rayner

Synonyms
- Bidens ciliata De Wild., for var. acuticaulis; Bidens paupercula Sherff, for var. acuticaulis; Bidens paupercula var. filirostris P.Taylor, for var filirostris

Species of flowering plant

Bidens acuticaulis is an annual herbaceous flowering plant in the family Asteraceae. It is found in parts of tropical Africa (from the Democratic Republic of the Congo to Mozambique). There are two currently accepted varieties of this species – B. acuticaulis var. acuticaulis, and B. acuticaulis var. filirostris.

== Description ==
Bidens acuticaulis is an annual herbaceous flowering plant that grows a reddish erect stem up to a metre tall. The leaves are 2–13 cm (0.79–5.12 in) long and up to 6 cm wide, and are once or twice pinnately divided.

Flower heads contain both ray florets and disc florets. The flower heads are held singly on peduncles up to 15 cm long. Each flower head contains involucres that are up to 8 mm long, which lengthen up to 13 mm when the head is fruiting.

The ray florets are yellow, with the upper part being paler than the rest of the floret. The rays are 6–7 mm long by up to 1.5 mm wide. The disc florets are yellow, and are shaped like a bell.

The fruits are black or dark brown achenes that are narrowly ellipsoid, with closely pressed hairs. The achenes contain beaks that are between 2.5 and 24 cm long, depending on the botanical variety.

== Distribution ==
Bidens acuticaulis grows in parts of central Tropical Africa (Angola, Democratic Republic of the Congo, Malawi, Mozambique, Tanzania, Zambia). The varieties of Bidens acuticaulis grow in different locations – var. filirostris grows in Angola, Tanzania and Zambia while var. acuticaulis grows throughout the entirety of the species' distribution.

== Taxonomy ==
Bidens acuticaulis was first formally named and described by Earl Edward Sherff in 1915 in the Botanical Gazette journal.

=== Varieties ===
As of January 2025, Plants of the World Online accepted two varieties for this species;

- Bidens acuticaulis var. acuticaulis autonym
- Bidens acuticaulis var. filirostris (P.Taylor) T.G.J.Rayner

When Timothy Guy Johnson Rayner (a botanist) reduced Bidens paupercula Sherff to a synonym under Bidens acuticaulis in 1992, the variety B. p. var. filirostris had to be renamed to Bidens acuticaulis var. filirostris. The main difference that separates var. filirostris from var. acuticaulis is the beaks on the achenes – var. filirostris plants have beaks up to 24–26 cm long, while var. acuticaulis plants have beaks up to 2.5 cm long.
