= Mākua Valley =

Valley on O'ahu, Hawai'i that was used by the US military for training

The Mākua Valley Struggle is an ongoing land rights dispute between Native Hawaiians and the U.S. military.

== Background ==
The U.S. military has occupied parts of Mākua Valley since the early 1940s.

== Struggle ==
The struggle was triggered by numerous evictions in the Mākua Valley on the island of Oʻahu, and was followed by dozens of more threats, with the main targets being Native Hawaiians who had lived there for fifty years or longer. The evictions began in 1983, which led to numerous sit-ins and camp-ins, and the eventual arrest of 16 protestors after the third eviction in June 1996. Much of this action was started in the 60's, but the two major events happened with the mass arrests and disturbance that occurred on January 20, 1983, and the mass eviction in January 1996. This mass eviction is particularly notable, because the Governor at the time, Ben Cayetano, kept the media from reporting, and even went as far as threatening to arrest and suppress the press should they try to report on the event.

First settlement in 1999 when the U.S. Army halted military testing until the Environmental Impact Statement could be completed. The Environmental Assessment was issued in 2000.

In early 2020, a bill was introduced to clean up and return the land to Hawaii.
