= Bidens acrifolia =

Scientific classification
- Kingdom: Plantae
- Clade: Tracheophytes
- Clade: Angiosperms
- Clade: Eudicots
- Clade: Asterids
- Order: Asterales
- Family: Asteraceae
- Genus: Bidens
- Species: B. acrifolia

Binomial name
- Bidens acrifolia Sherff

Varieties
- Bidens acrifolia var. acrifolia Autonym; Bidens acrifolia var. langlassei (Sherff) Melchert

Synonyms
- Bidens polyglossa Sherff, for var. acrifolia; Bidens langlassei Sherff, for var. langlassei; Cosmos langlassei Sherff, for var. langlassei

Species of flowering plant

Bidens acrifolia is a herbaceous flowering plant in the family Asteraceae. It is found from northeast Mexico to southwest Mexico.

== Description ==
Bidens acrifolia is a herbaceous flowering plant. It is mostly glabrous, with slender stems and branches. The leaves are bipinnately divided into linear segments 1-3 mm wide. The flower heads are solitary, and are attached to peduncles 5 cm long. The flowers have 6 yellow ligules up to 1.4 cm long.

== Distribution and habitat ==
Bidens acrifolia occurs in northern and southwest Mexico.

== Taxonomy ==
Bidens acrifolia was first named and described by Earl Edward Sherff in 1933 in the Botanical Gazette journal.

=== Varieties ===
As of December 2024, the plant database Plants of the World Online accepted two varieties for this species;

- Bidens acrifolia var. acrifolia autonym. northeast to southwest Mexico
- Bidens acrifolia var. langlassei (Sherff) Melchert. from Guerrero, Mexico
