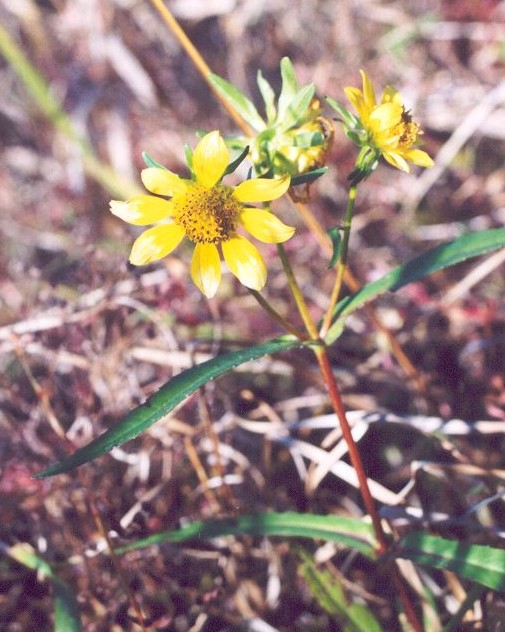

Conservation status
- Secure (NatureServe)

Scientific classification
- Kingdom: Plantae
- Clade: Tracheophytes
- Clade: Angiosperms
- Clade: Eudicots
- Clade: Asterids
- Order: Asterales
- Family: Asteraceae
- Genus: Bidens
- Species: B. laevis

Binomial name
- Bidens laevis (L.) Britton, Sterns, & Poggenb.

Synonyms
- Synonymy: Bidens chrysanthemoides Michx.; Bidens elegans Greene; Bidens expansa Greene; Bidens formosa Greene 1901 not Sch. Bip. 1856; Bidens helianthoides Kunth; Bidens lugens Greene; Bidens nashii Small; Bidens nashii Wooton; Bidens parryi Greene; Bidens persicifolia Greene; Bidens quadriaristata DC.; Bidens speciosa Parish 1900 not Gardner 1845; Coreopsis flammula Banks ex Steud.; Coreopsis perfoliata Walter; Coreopsis radiata Mill.; Helianthus laevis L.; Heliopsis laevis (L.) Pers.; Kerneria helianthoides (Kunth) Cass.

= Bidens laevis =

Species of flowering plant

Bidens laevis is a species of flowering plant in the daisy family known by the common names larger bur-marigold and smooth beggarticks. It is native to South America, Mexico, and the southern and eastern United States. It grows in wetlands, including estuaries and riverbanks.

Bidens laevis is similar in appearance to its relative Bidens cernua and the two are sometimes confused. This is an annual or perennial herb growing over 20 centimeters tall and sometimes much taller, exceeding one meter in height and sometimes approaching two. The narrow lance-shaped leaves are 5 to 15 centimeters long, with finely toothed edges and pointed tips. The inflorescence bears one or more flower heads which bend down as they become heavy with fruit after flowering. Each head has a center of yellow disc florets and a fringe of 7 or 8 yellow ray florets each up to 3 centimeters long. The fruit is a dry achene with sharp barbs that adhere to fur and clothing, thus helping the plant with seed dispersal.
