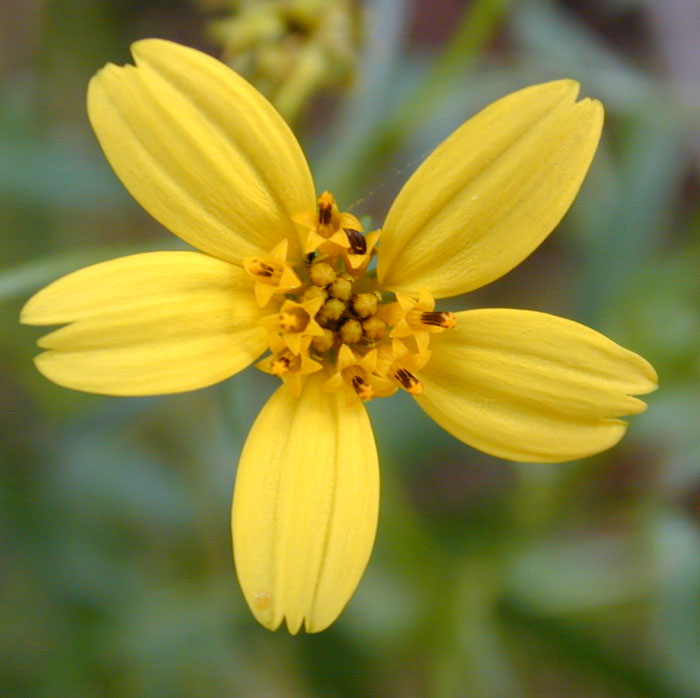
- Flower head

Conservation status
- Imperiled (NatureServe)

Scientific classification
- Kingdom: Plantae
- Clade: Embryophytes
- Clade: Tracheophytes
- Clade: Spermatophytes
- Clade: Angiosperms
- Clade: Eudicots
- Clade: Asterids
- Order: Asterales
- Family: Asteraceae
- Genus: Bidens
- Species: B. torta

Binomial name
- Bidens torta Sherff

Synonyms
- Bidens fulvescens Sherff; Bidens personans O.Deg. & Sherff; Bidens waianensis Sherff

= Bidens torta =

Species of flowering plant

Bidens torta, the corkscrew beggarticks, or ko'oko'olau in Hawai'i, is a flowering plant species in the family Asteraceae. They are known for their role in the plant communities of the Hawaiian Islands. The species is part of a larger group of Hawaiian Bidens that have different variations across different environments. The Bidens tortas adapted to different ecological environments across the Hawaiian islands. Since the Hawaiian islands are geographically isolated, the evolution provides scientist with insight into plant diversification and speciation.

== Description ==
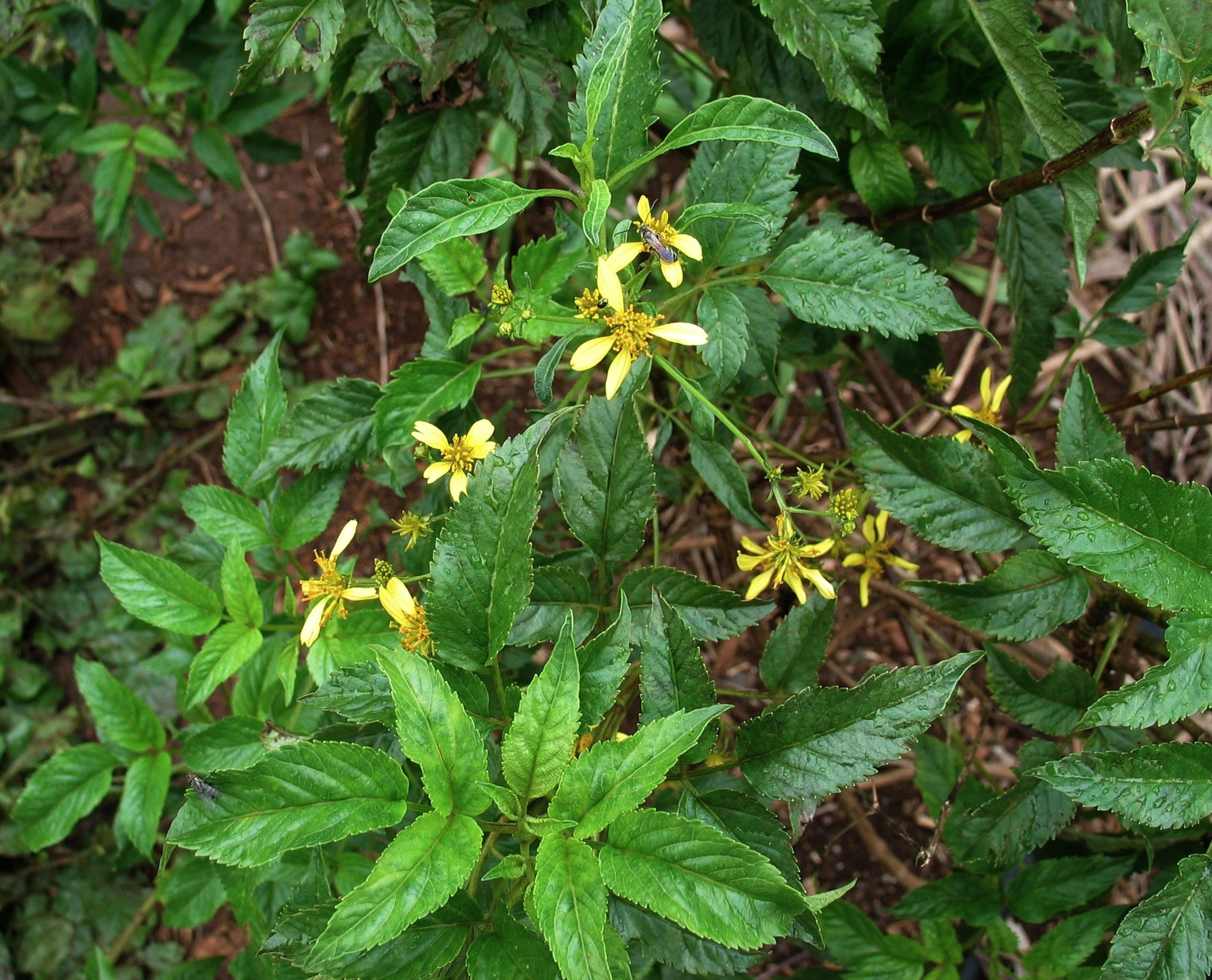
B. torta plant

Bidens torta have many morphological features common to other genus Bidens. The plant produces yellow flower heads composed of central disc florets surrounded by ray florets. The leaves are arranged opposite from each other. The flower produces seeds equipped with barbed awns that attach easily to animals or clothing. Allowing the seeds to disperse over long distances, increasing the plant's chances of survival in new locations. This dispersal mechanism is responsible for the common name "beggarticks".

== Distribution and habitat ==
Species with the genus Bidens, including Bidens torta, are found throughout the Hawaiian Islands. Variety of habitats from dry shrublands to mountainous regions. Best grown in well drained soils and adequate sunlight. Some populations can tolerate varying conditions. Its ability to thrive in different environments demonstrates its ecological flexibility.

== Human use and cultural significance ==
Plants in the genus Bidens, are known in Hawaiian culture as ko'oko'olau and have been used in traditional herbal practices. Used in herbal teas, it was believed to support general health and wellness. The species have been also studied by scientist to provide an example of plant evolution in island environments. Research on their genetics and morphology have helped scientists better understand adaptive radiation and species diversification.
