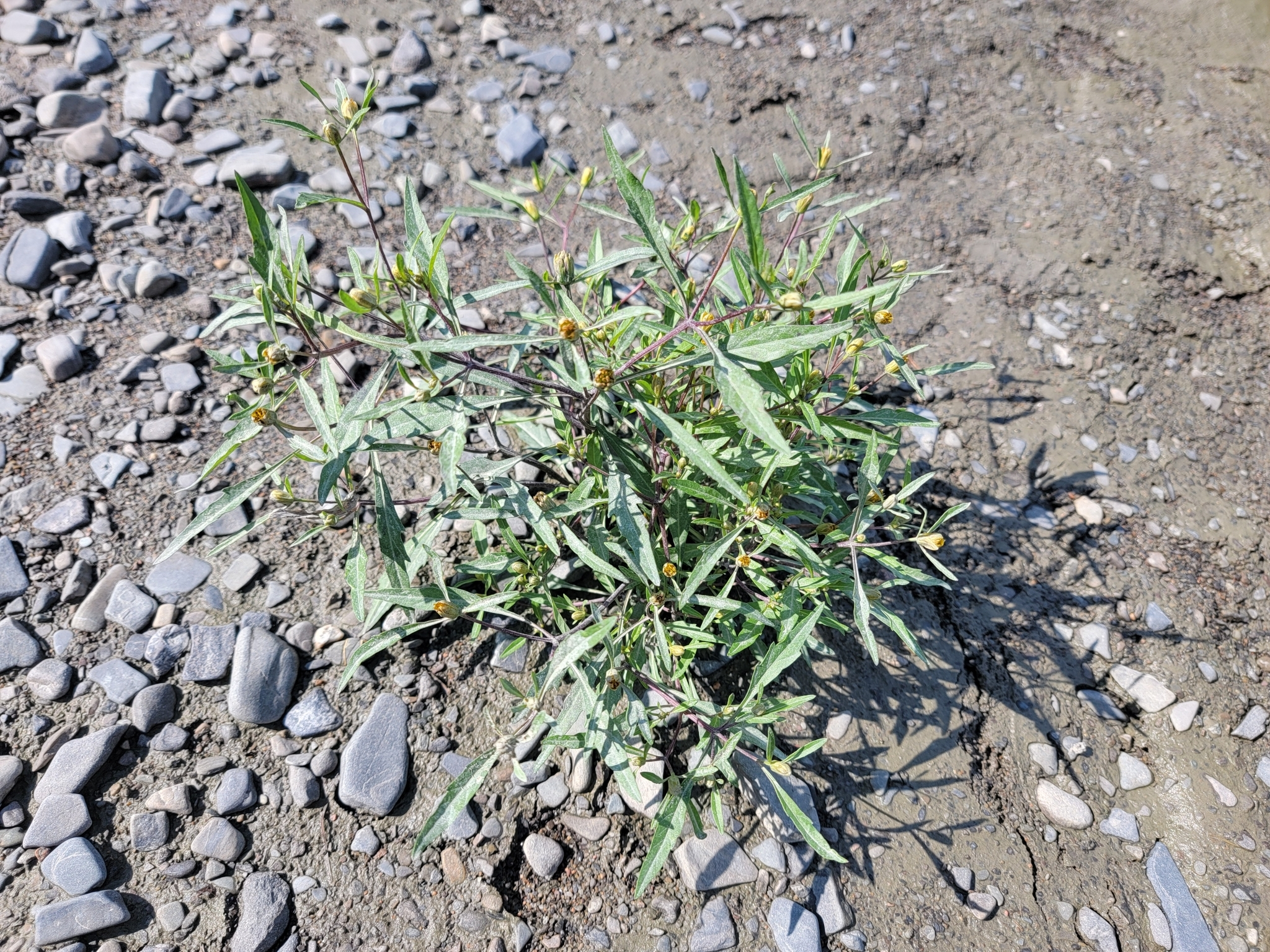

Conservation status
- Vulnerable (IUCN 3.1)

Scientific classification
- Kingdom: Plantae
- Clade: Tracheophytes
- Clade: Angiosperms
- Clade: Eudicots
- Clade: Asterids
- Order: Asterales
- Family: Asteraceae
- Genus: Bidens
- Species: B. eatonii

Binomial name
- Bidens eatonii Fernald

= Bidens eatonii =

Species of aquatic plant

Bidens eatonii (Eaton's beggarticks) is a North American species of flowering plant in the family Asteraceae. It is native to eastern Canada (Québec, New Brunswick, Prince Edward Island) and the northeastern United States (Maine, Massachusetts, Connecticut, New York, New Jersey).

Bidens eatonii is an annual herb up to 150 cm (60 inches) tall. It produces as many as 3 flower heads containing yellow disc florets but usually no ray florets (occasionally 1, 2, or 3). The species grows mostly along the banks of estuaries and coastal salt marshes.

== Conservation status in the United States ==
It is listed as endangered in Connecticut, Massachusetts, and New Jersey. It is listed as threatened in Maine.
