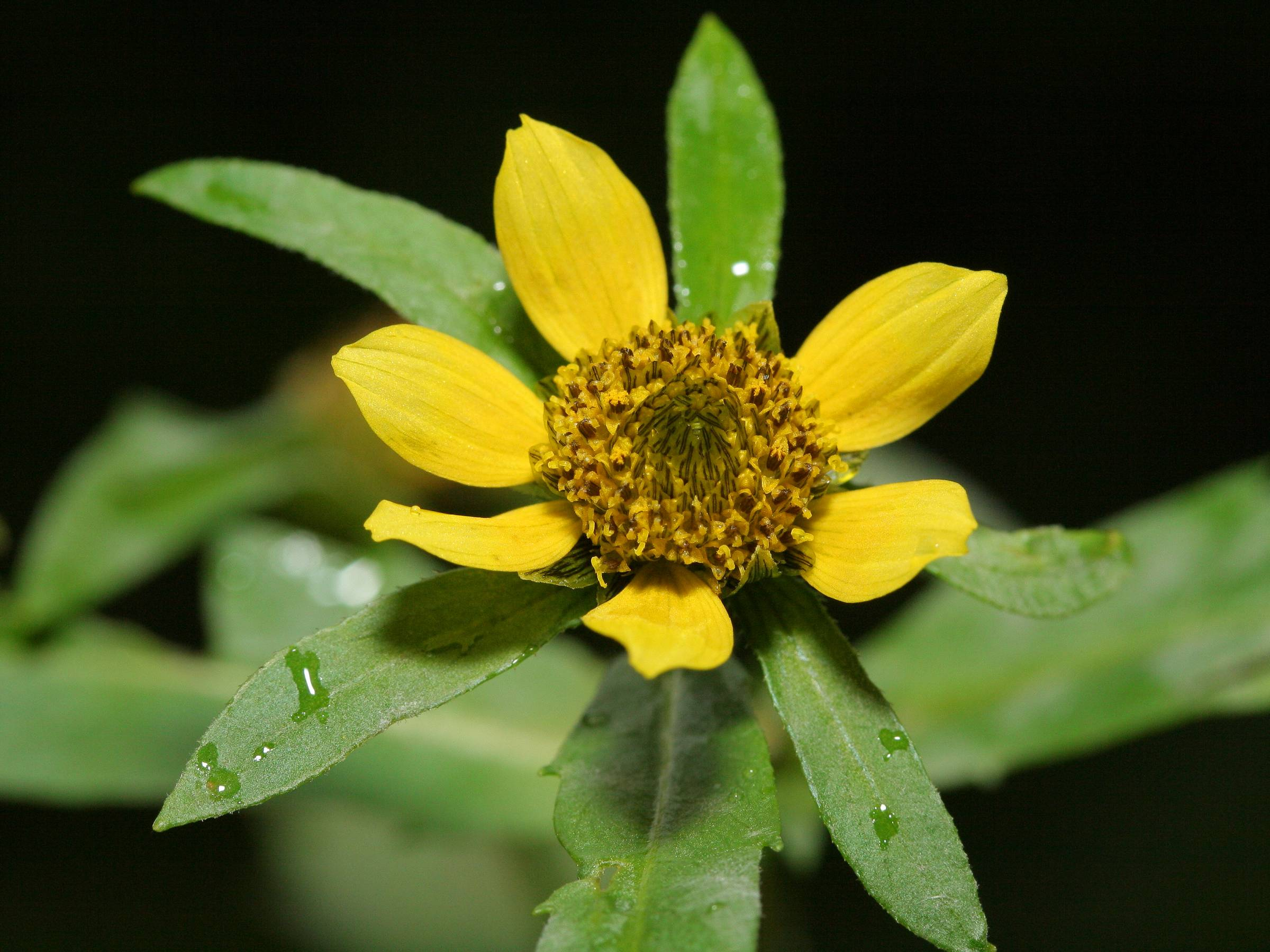

Conservation status
- Secure (NatureServe)

Scientific classification
- Kingdom: Plantae
- Clade: Embryophytes
- Clade: Tracheophytes
- Clade: Angiosperms
- Clade: Eudicots
- Clade: Asterids
- Order: Asterales
- Family: Asteraceae
- Genus: Bidens
- Species: B. cernua

Binomial name
- Bidens cernua L.

Synonyms
- Bidens ciliolata Greene; Bidens cusickii Greene; Bidens dentata (Nutt.) Wiegand; Bidens elliptica (Wiegand) Gleason; Bidens filamentosa Rydb.; Bidens gracilenta Greene; Bidens graveolens Komarov 1916 not Mart. 1824; Bidens kelloggii Greene; Bidens leptomeria Greene; Bidens leptopoda Greene; Bidens lonchophylla Greene; Bidens macounii Greene; Bidens marginata Greene 1901 not Perr ex DC. 1836; Bidens minima Huds.; Bidens prionophylla Greene; Bidens quadriaristata var. dentata Nutt.; Bidens tripartita var. minima Huds.; Bidens venosa Gardner; Buphthalmum nutans Vitman; Coreopsis bidens L.; Coreopsis quadricornis Krock.; Coreopsis ridens Gunnerus

= Bidens cernua =

Species of flowering plant in the daisy family

Bidens cernua is a species of flowering plant in the aster family, Asteraceae. It is commonly called nodding beggarticks or nodding bur-marigold. Bidens cernua is distributed throughout much of Eurasia and North America.

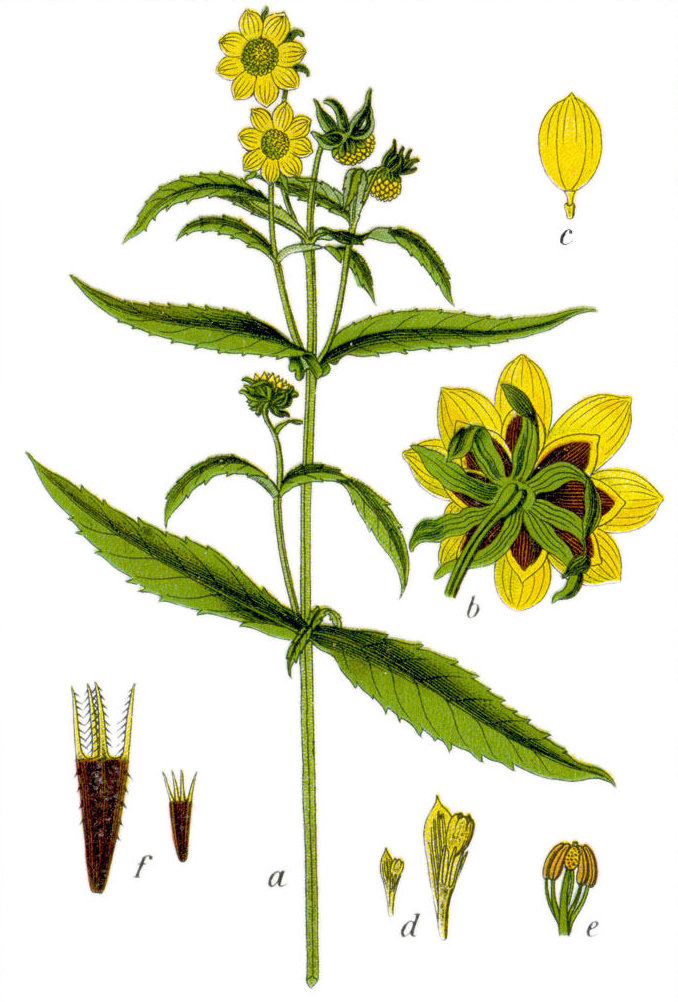

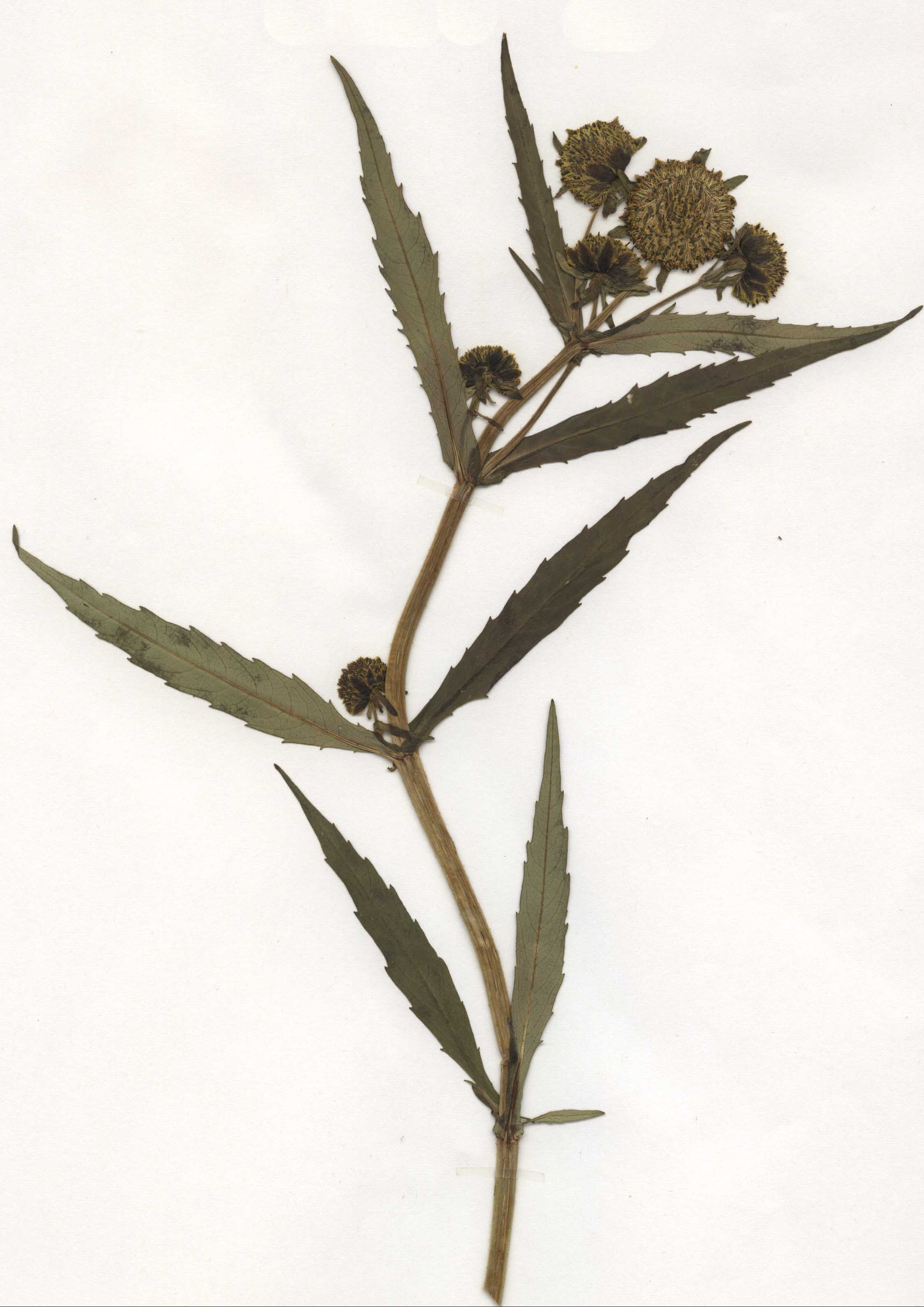

== Description ==
Bidens cernua is an annual species growing roughly 1m tall, with a fibrous root. Stems are rigid and often either simple or beached. Stem leaves are simple, unstalked, and opposite with saw-toothed to almost smooth margins.

It has yellow flowers with 6–8 ray narrowly lance shaped petals around a central disk. The hemispheric heads are solitary at the ends of branches and nod with age.

The achenes are narrowly wedge-shaped and 4-sided, flattened and ribbed. The pappus has 3–4 barbed bristles.

== Distribution and abundance ==
Bidens cernua is distributed throughout much of Eurasia and North America.
