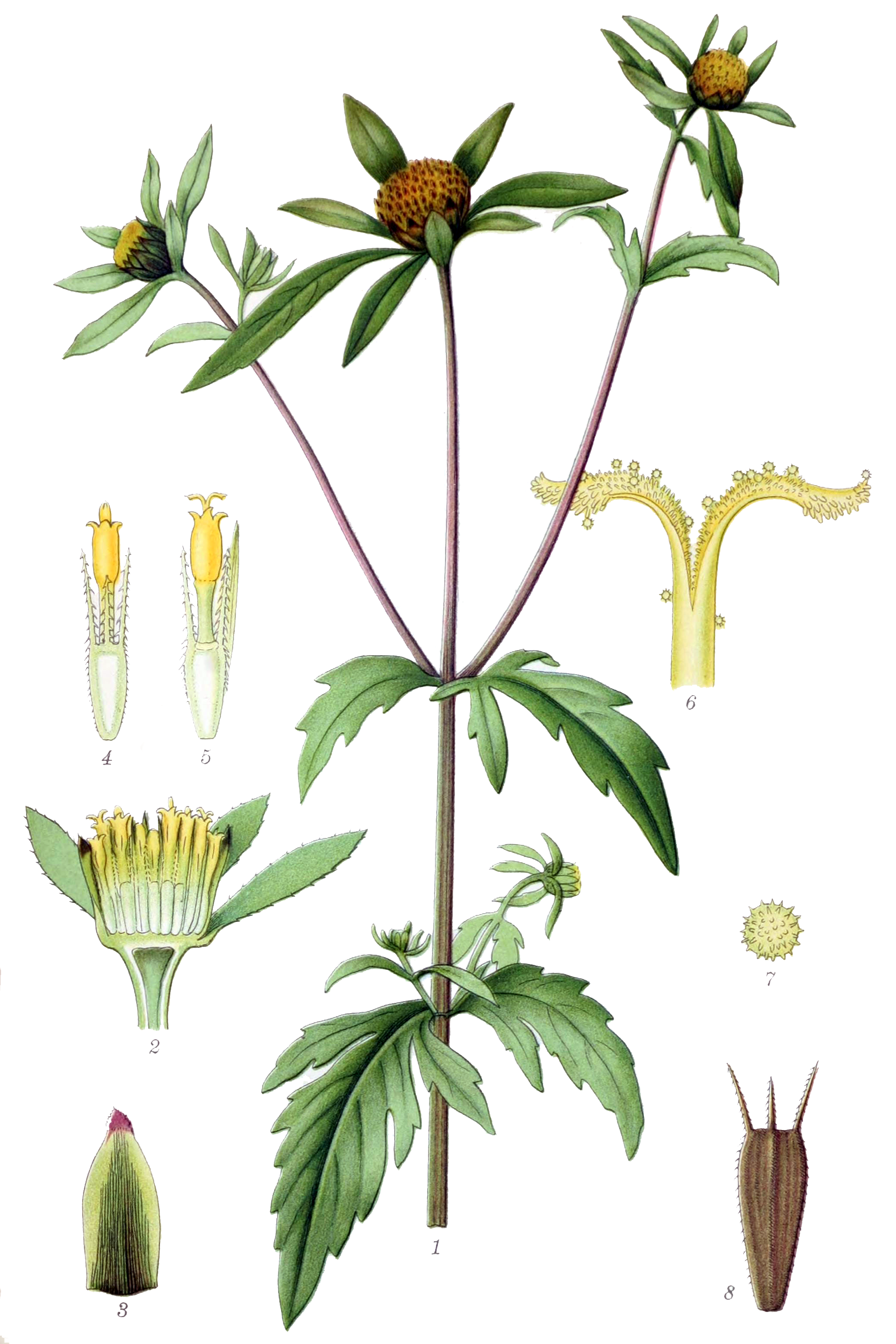

Conservation status
- Least Concern (IUCN 3.1)

Scientific classification
- Kingdom: Plantae
- Clade: Tracheophytes
- Clade: Angiosperms
- Clade: Eudicots
- Clade: Asterids
- Order: Asterales
- Family: Asteraceae
- Genus: Bidens
- Species: B. tripartita

Binomial name
- Bidens tripartita L.

Synonyms
- Synonymy: Bidens acuta (Wiegand) Britton; Bidens orientalis Velen.; Bidens shimadai Hayata; Bidens bullata L., syn of subsp. bullatus; Bidens hirtus Godr., syn of subsp. bullatus; Bidens repens D.Don, syn of var. repens; Bidens trifida Buch.-Ham. ex Roxb., syn of var. repens

= Bidens tripartita =

Species of plants in the sunflower family

Bidens tripartita is a common and widespread species of flowering plant in the sunflower family, Asteraceae, commonly known as three-lobe beggarticks, three-part beggarticks, leafy-bracted beggarticks or trifid bur-marigold. It is native to much of Eurasia, North Africa, and North America, with naturalized populations in Australia and on some Pacific Islands.

== Distribution and abundance ==
Bidens tripartita is native to much of Eurasia, North Africa, and North America, with naturalized populations in Australia and on some Pacific Islands. Bidens tripartita is considered relatively rare in southwestern British Columbia and was likely introduced from eastern North America and Europe.

== Morphology ==
Bidens tripartita is an annual species with rigid stems and fibrous roots, with a typical habit measuring 20-100 centimeters tall. Leaves are often deeply lobed. Flower heads are discoid and lacking ray flowers. Fruits are achenes.

== Subspecies and varieties ==
- Bidens tripartita subsp. bullatus (L.) Rouy
- Bidens tripartita var. repens (D.Don) Sherff
- Bidens tripartita subsp. tripartita
- Bidens tripartita var. tripartita

== Uses ==
=== Medicinal ===
Although rarely used for medicinal purposes nowadays, it was once highly esteemed for being effective at staunching blood flow and as a remedy for bleeding, specifically one caused by ruptured blood vessels, but also extending to uterine bleeding and conditions that lead to hematuria.The species is also known for its styptic, astringent, antiseptic, aperient and diaphoretic effects on the human body. Remedies containing the herb usually take form of tinctures and infusions.

=== Other ===
The dried herb, specifically the dried flower heads, of Bidens tripartita can be burnt to release a cedar-like smell that may be used for an incense against insects.

== Photo gallery ==
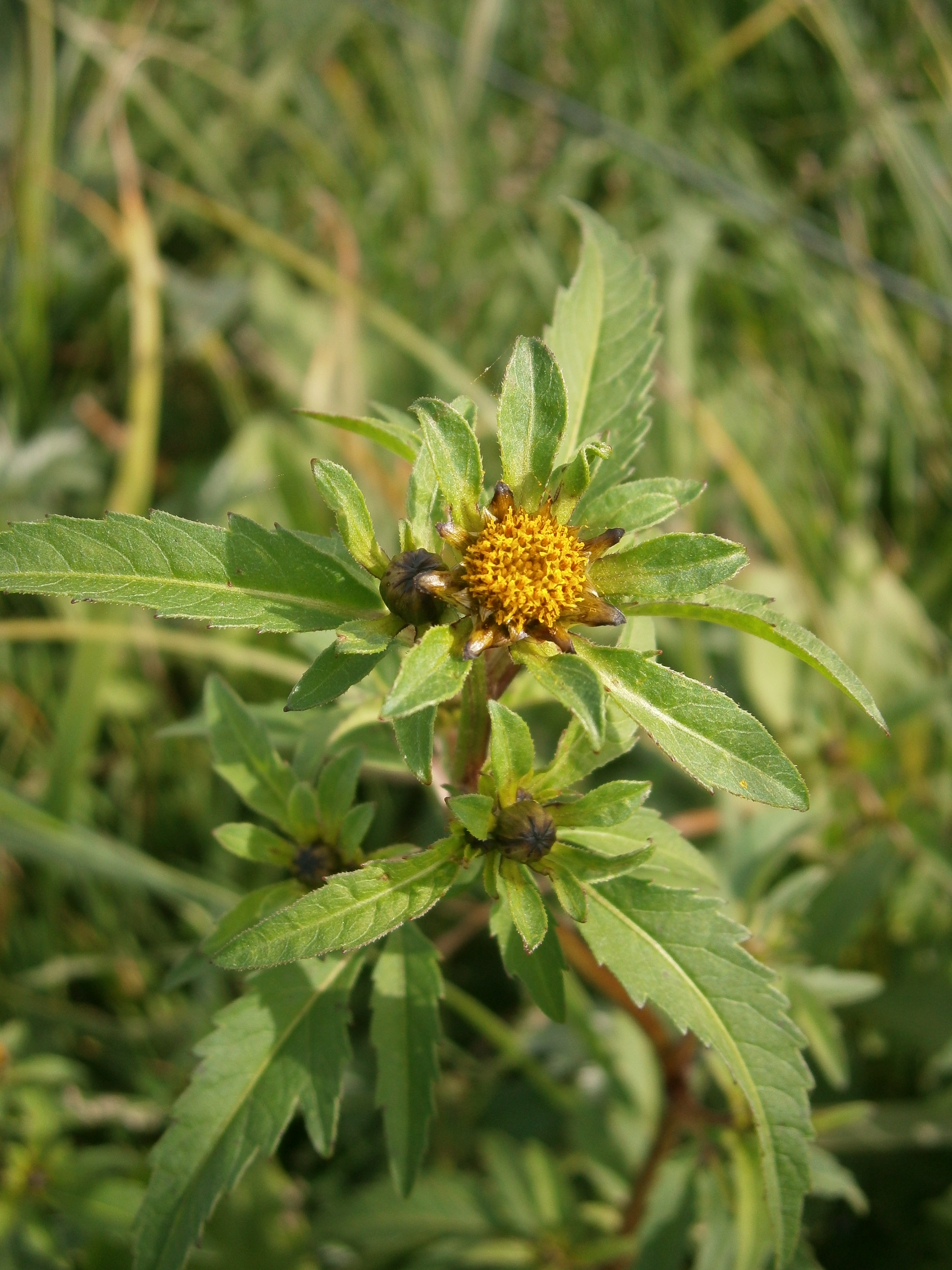

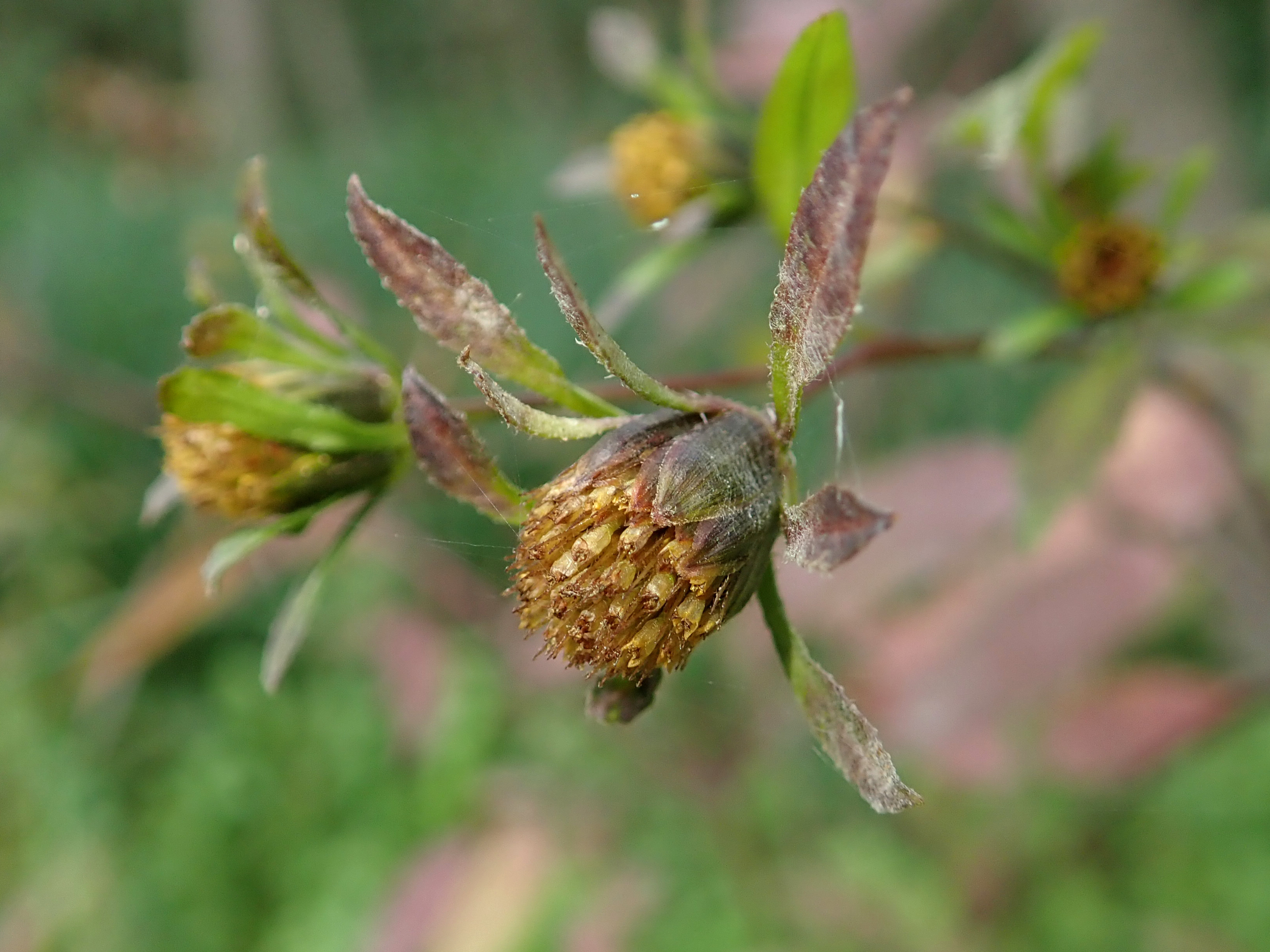

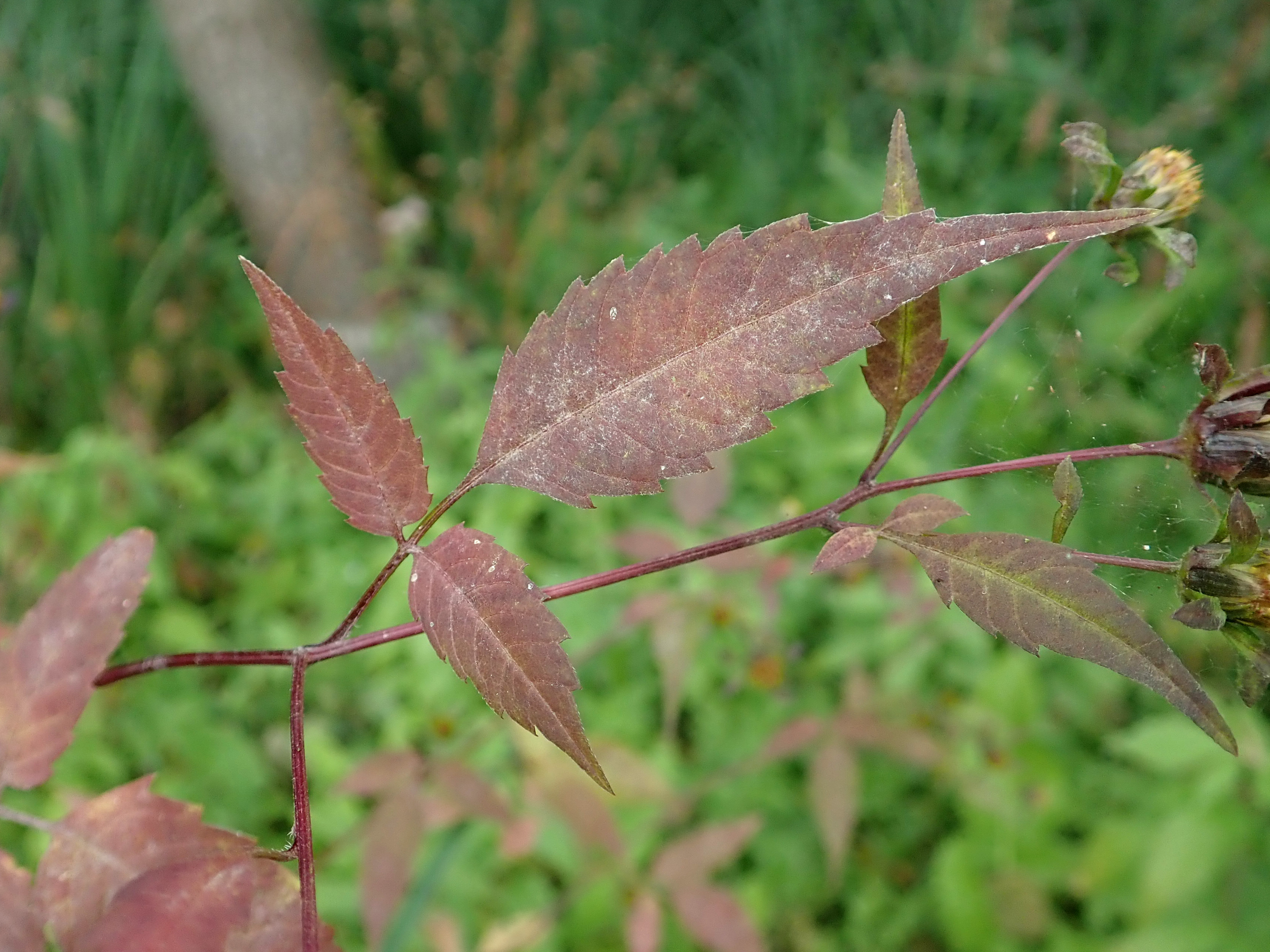

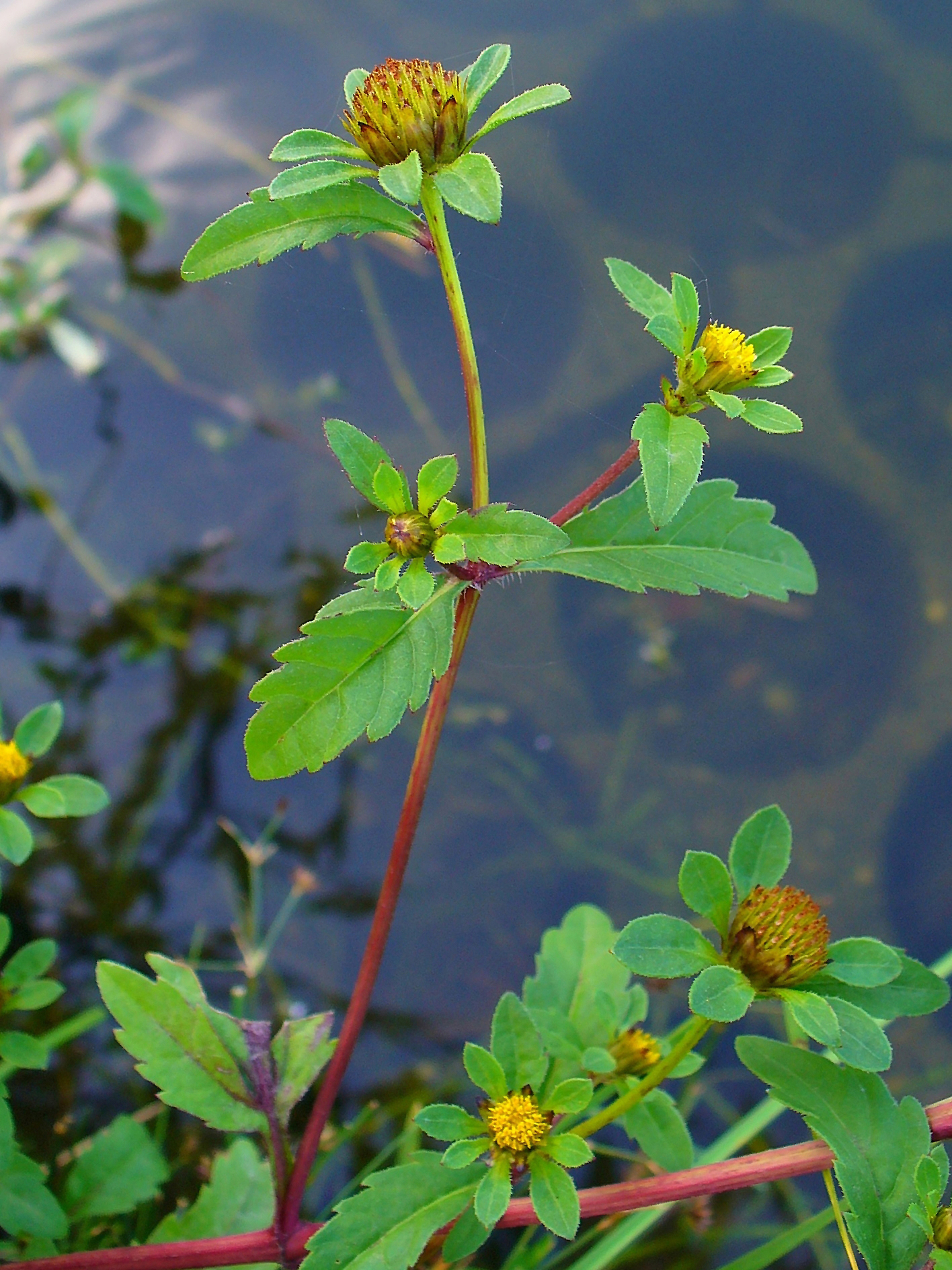

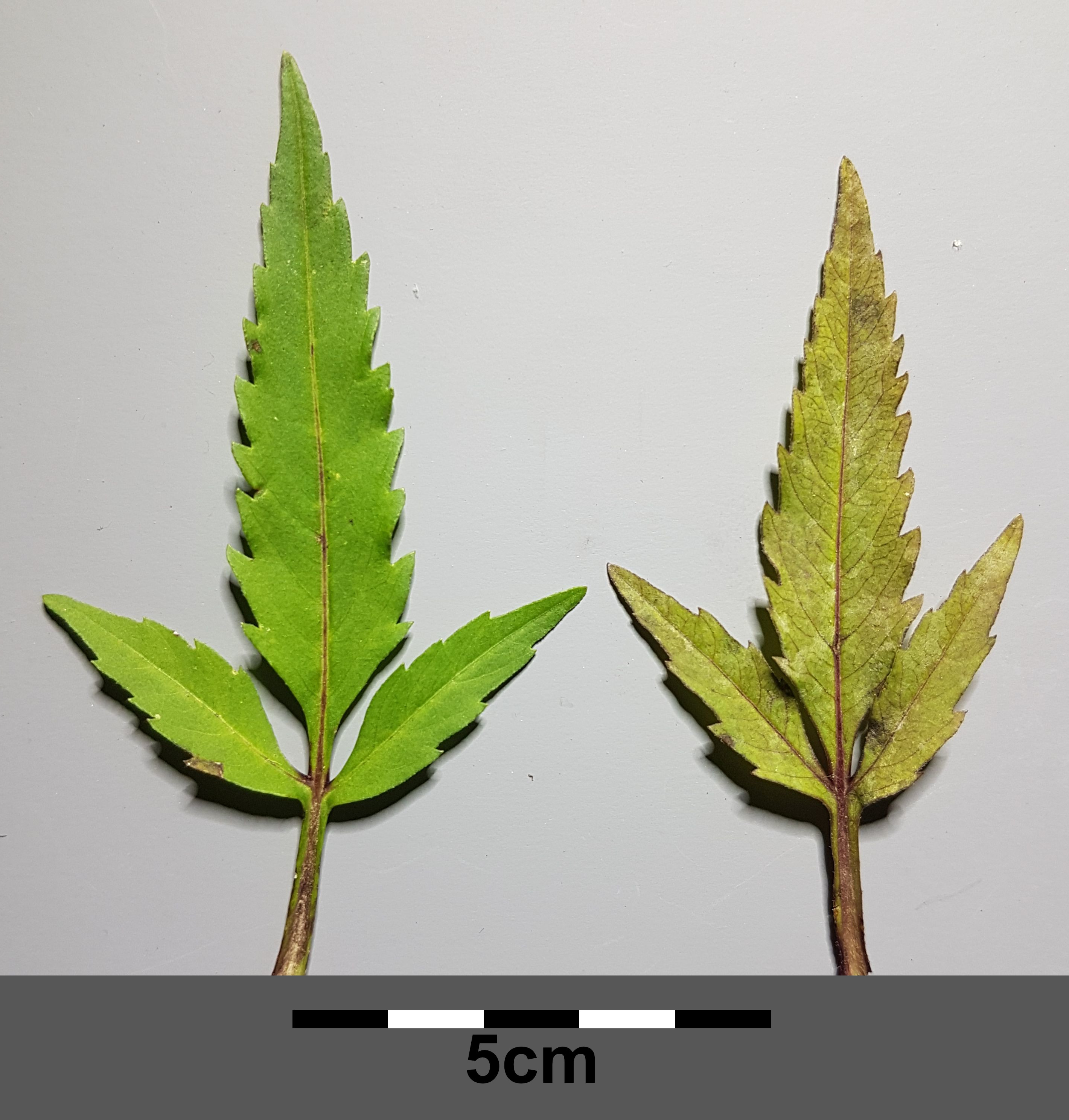

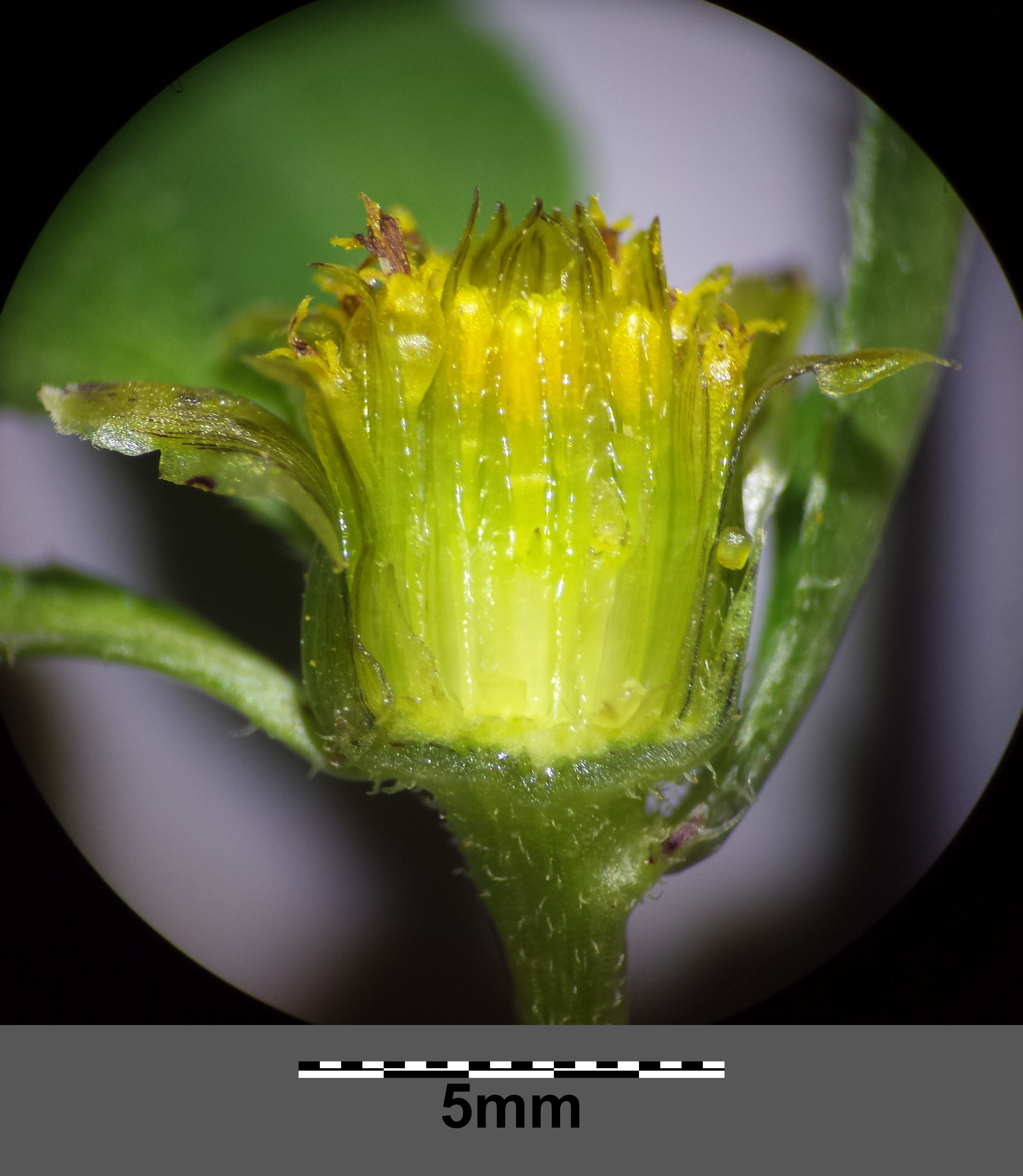

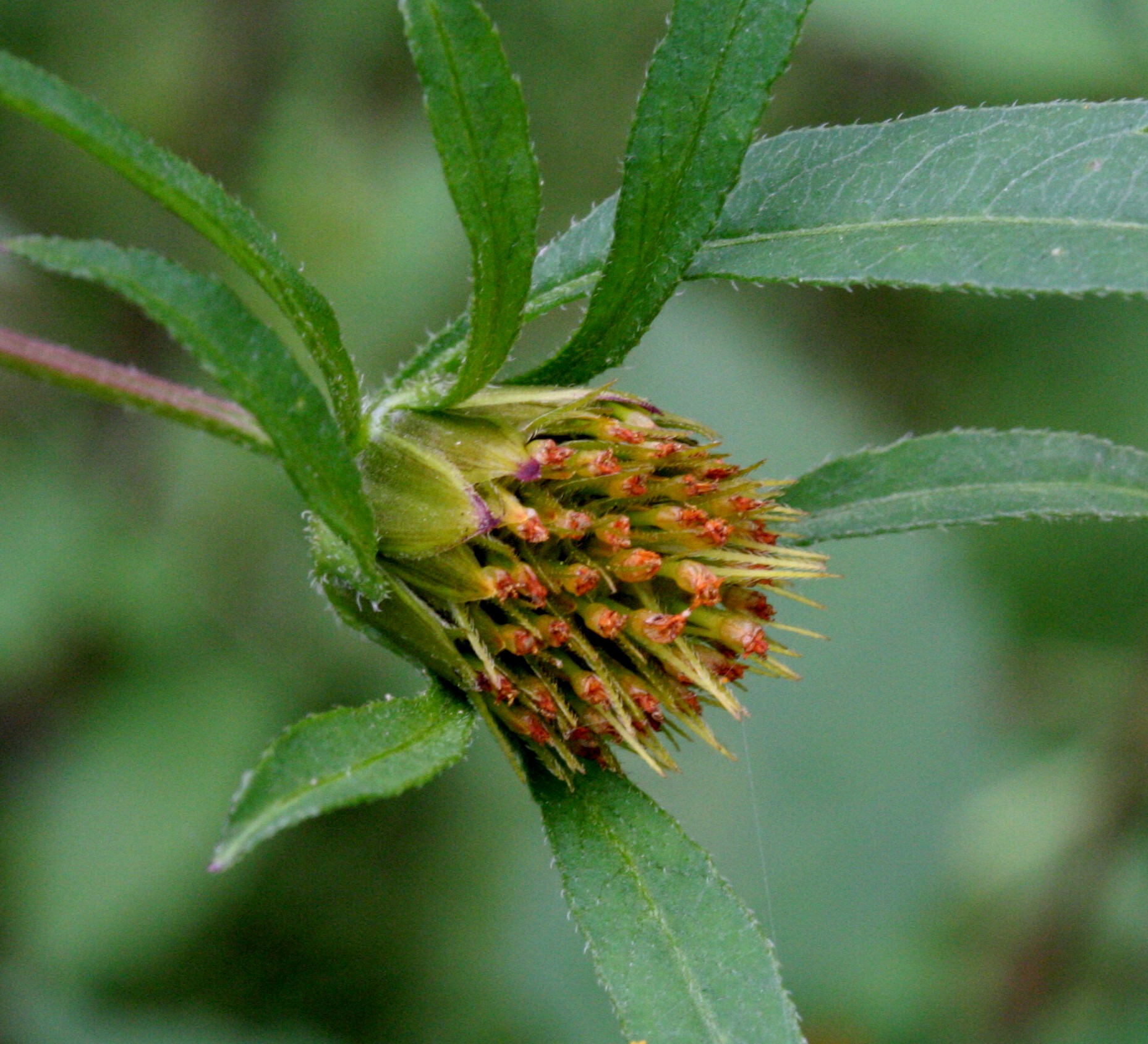
