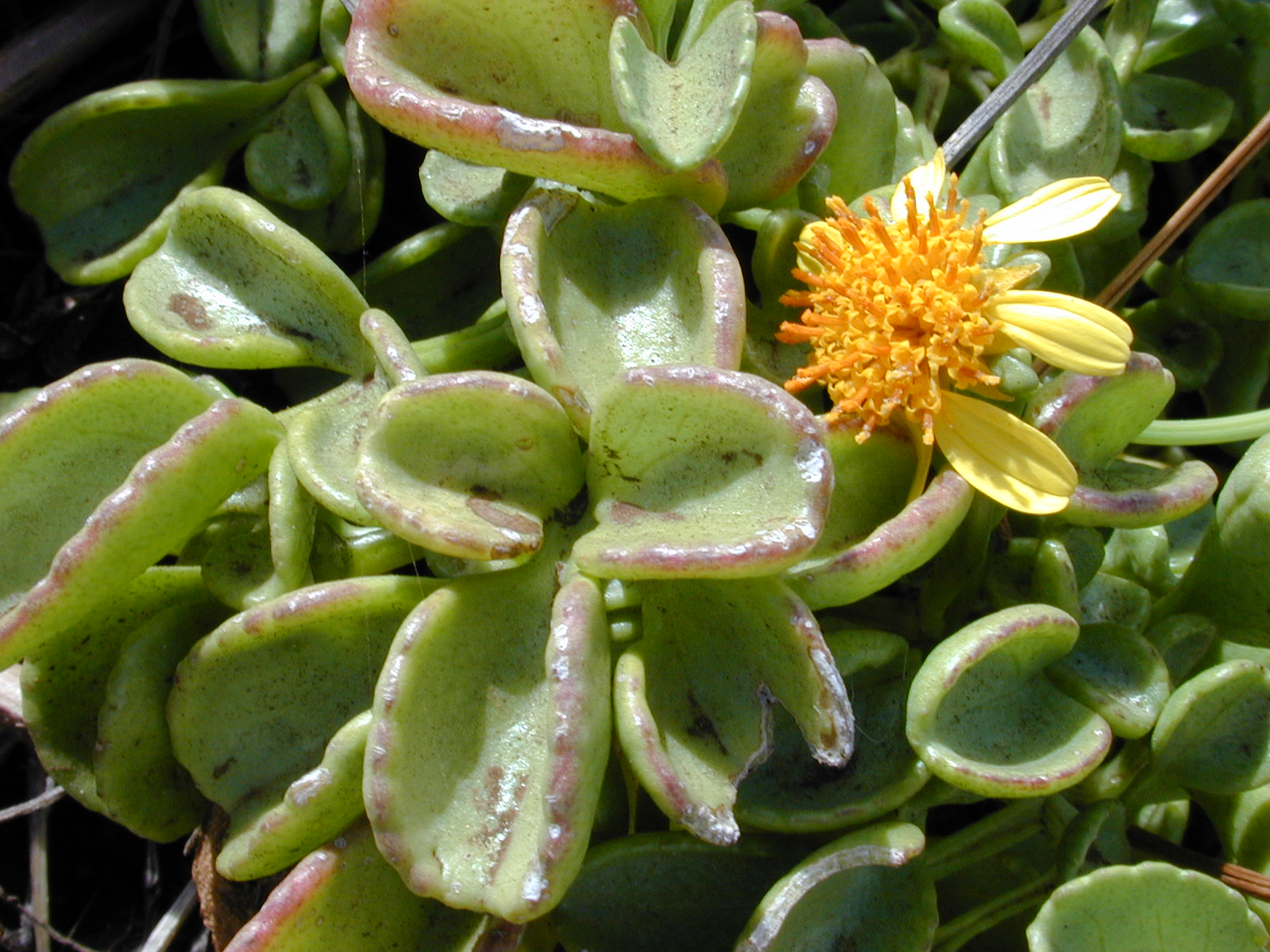

Conservation status
- Secure (NatureServe)

Scientific classification
- Kingdom: Plantae
- Clade: Tracheophytes
- Clade: Angiosperms
- Clade: Eudicots
- Clade: Asterids
- Order: Asterales
- Family: Asteraceae
- Genus: Bidens
- Species: B. mauiensis

Binomial name
- Bidens mauiensis (A. Gray) Sherff

Synonyms
- Bidens awaluana O.Deg., I.Deg. & Sherff

= Bidens mauiensis =

Species of flowering plant

Bidens mauiensis, common names Maui beggarticks and ko`oko`olau, is a herb in the family Asteraceae.

== Distribution ==
This plant grows in Maui, Hawaii, United States.
