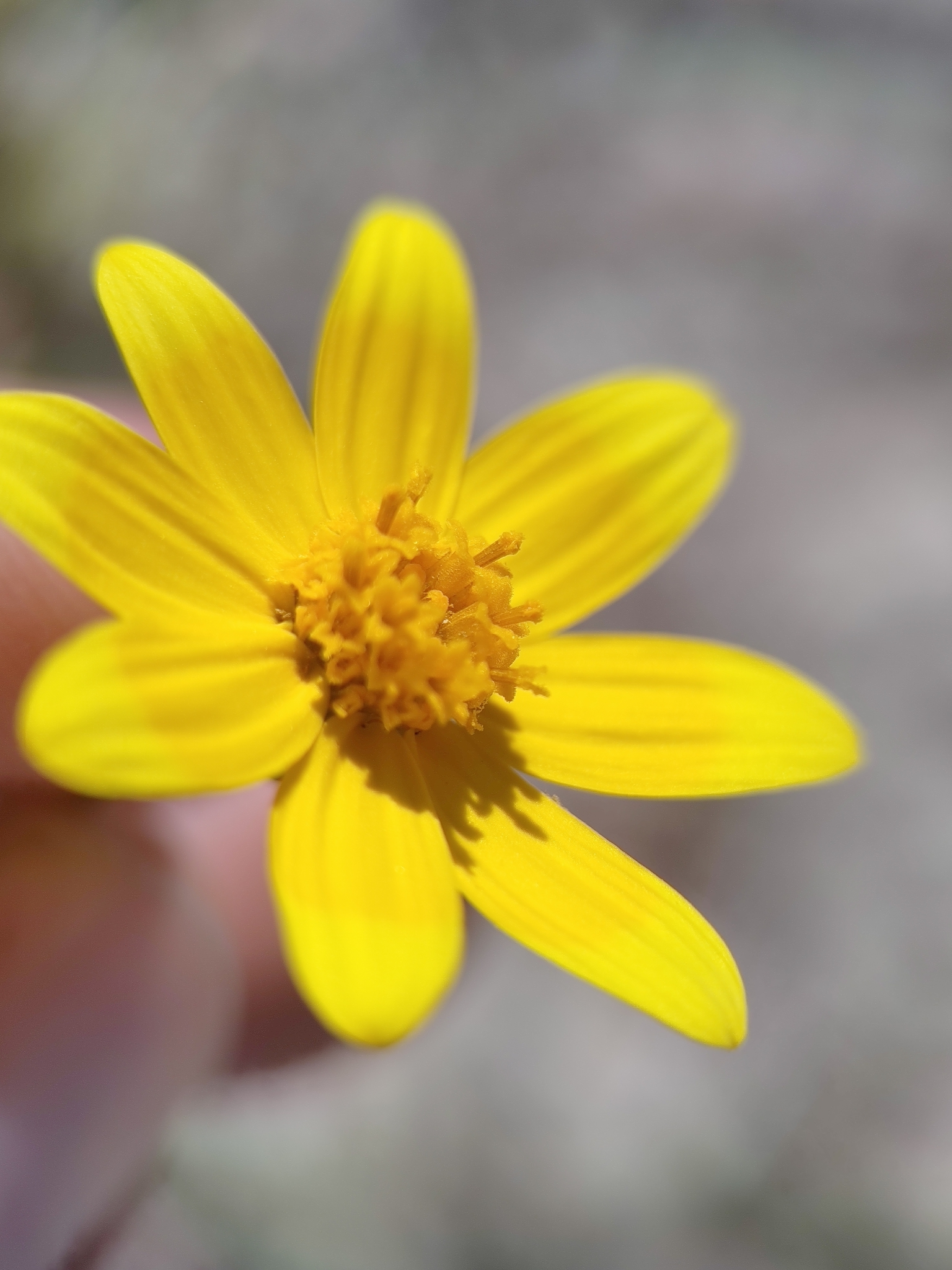

Scientific classification
- Kingdom: Plantae
- Clade: Tracheophytes
- Clade: Angiosperms
- Clade: Eudicots
- Clade: Asterids
- Order: Asterales
- Family: Asteraceae
- Genus: Bidens
- Species: B. cabopulmensis

Binomial name
- Bidens cabopulmensis León de la Luz & B.L.Turner

= Bidens cabopulmensis =

Species of flowering plant

Bidens cabopulmensis is a rare species of flowering plant in the family Asteraceae. It is known only from the region in and near Cabo Pulmo National Park called Punta Arena. This is in the State of Baja California Sur in western Mexico.

Bidens cabopulmensis is a perennial herb up to 40 cm (16 inches) tall, generally branching only near the base. It produces one yellow flower heads per branch, each head containing both disc florets and ray florets. The species grows on coastal sand dunes.
