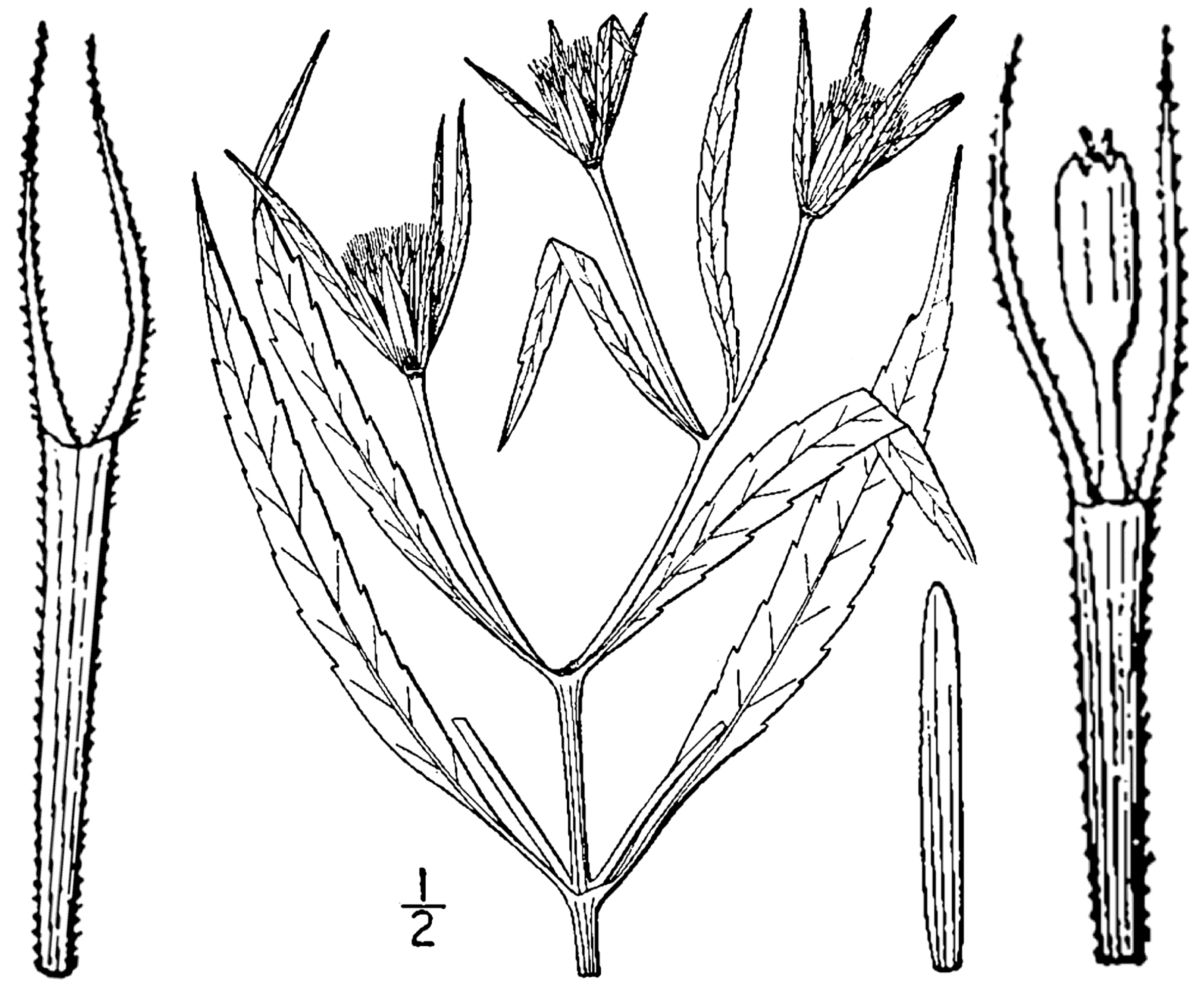
- 1913 illustration

Conservation status
- Vulnerable (NatureServe)

Scientific classification
- Kingdom: Plantae
- Clade: Tracheophytes
- Clade: Angiosperms
- Clade: Eudicots
- Clade: Asterids
- Order: Asterales
- Family: Asteraceae
- Genus: Bidens
- Species: B. bidentoides

Binomial name
- Bidens bidentoides (Nutt.) Britton

Synonyms
- Bidens bidentoides var. mariana (S.F.Blake) Sherff; Bidens bipinnata var. biternatoides Sherff; Bidens mariana S.F.Blake; Coreopsis bidentoides (Nutt.) Nutt. ex Torr. & A.Gray; Diodonta bidentoides Nutt.

= Bidens bidentoides =

Species of flowering plant

Bidens bidentoides (formerly Diodonta bidentoides), commonly called swamp beggar's-ticks and delmarva beggarticks, is an annual, herbaceous, flowering plant in the Asteraceae family. It is native to the northeastern and east-central parts of the United States, the coastal plain of the States of Maryland, Delaware, Pennsylvania, and New Jersey plus the region around the Hudson River estuary in New York.

== Description ==
Bidens bidentoides is an annual herb that typically grows between 10 and 90 cm (0.33 and 2.95 ft) tall. The opposite, lanceolate, variably toothed leaves are 4–16 cm long and 0.3–3 cm wide. Each flower usually has no ray florets, but there can be up to five. There are between 6 and 30 yellowish disk florets.

It typically blooms in September, but can sometimes bloom in August or October.

== Distribution and habitat ==
Bidens bidentoides is native to Delaware, Maryland, New Jersey, New York and Pennsylvania. The plant grows on the borders of streams and estuaries at an elevation of 0–10 metres from sea level.

== Conservation ==
As of November 2024, NatureServe listed Bidens bidentoides as Vulnerable (G3) worldwide. It is threatened by dredging, filling, pollution, housing development and possibly threatened by invasive species such as the purple loosestrife.

In individual states within the United States, it is listed as Critically Imperiled (S1) in Pennsylvania and New Jersey, Possibly Extirpated (SH) in Delaware, and Vulnerable (S3) in New York and Maryland.

== Taxonomy ==
Bidens bidentoides was first named and described as Diodonta bidentoides in 1841 by Thomas Nuttall in the Trans. Amer. Philos. Soc., n.s publication. It was moved to the genus Bidens, with the species epithet kept the same, by Nathaniel Lord Britton in 1893 in the Bulletin of the Torrey Botanical Club.
