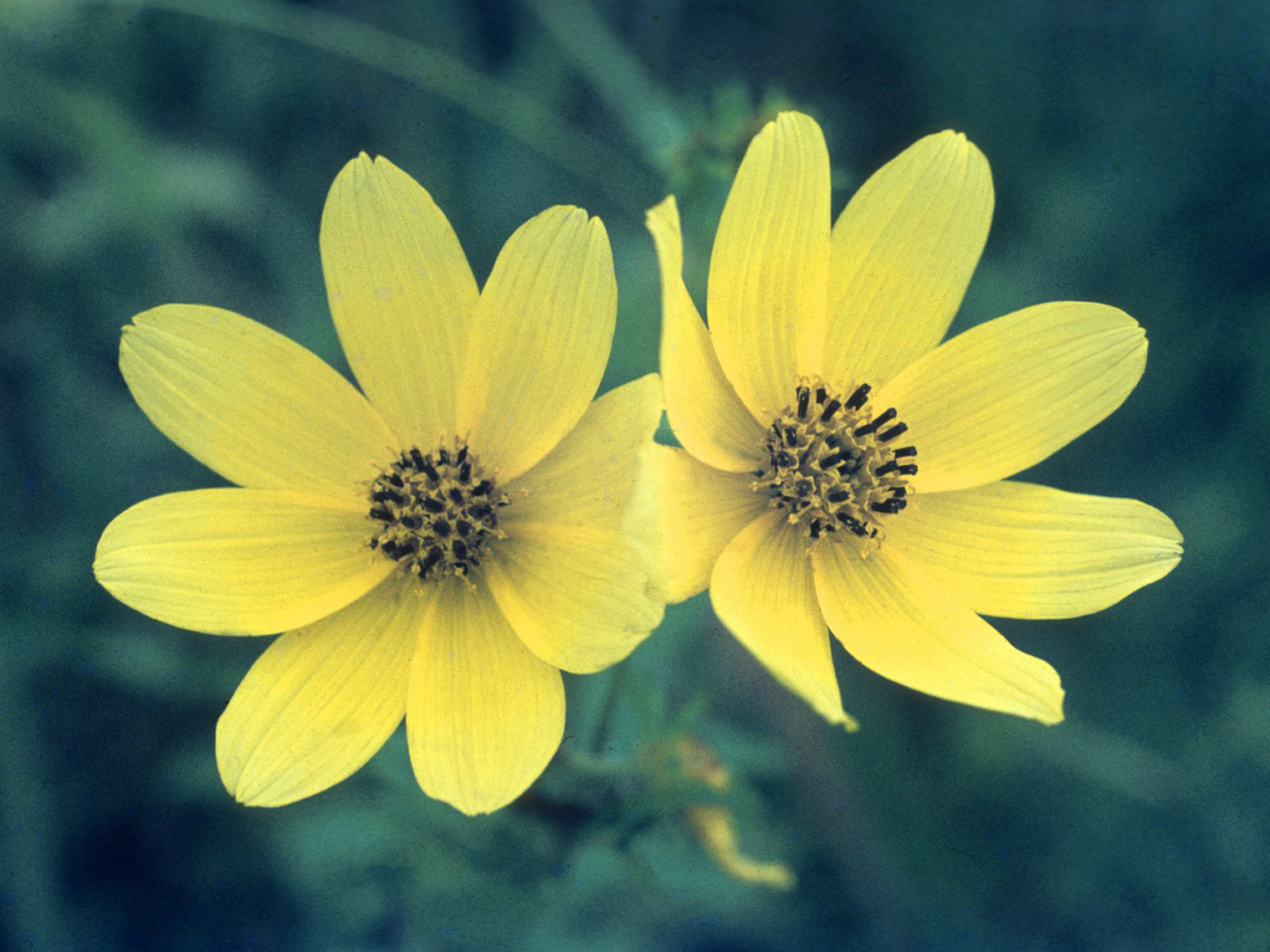

Scientific classification
- Kingdom: Plantae
- Clade: Tracheophytes
- Clade: Angiosperms
- Clade: Eudicots
- Clade: Asterids
- Order: Asterales
- Family: Asteraceae
- Genus: Bidens
- Species: B. trichosperma

Binomial name
- Bidens trichosperma (Michx.) Britton

Synonyms
- Bidens coronata Britton 1913 not Fisch. ex Steud. 1840 nor Colla 1834; Coreopsis aurea Lindl. 1829 not Ait. 1789; Coreopsis trichosperma Michx.

= Bidens trichosperma =

Species of flowering plant

Bidens trichosperma, the marsh beggar-ticks or marsh tickseed, is a North American species of flowering plant in the family Asteraceae. It is native to central Canada (Quebec, Ontario) and to the eastern and north-central United States (primarily the Northeast, Great Lakes, and northern Great Plains, with a few isolated populations in the Southeast).

Bidens trichosperma is an annual herb up to 150 cm (60 inches) tall. It produces numerous yellow flower heads containing both disc florets and ray florets. The species is commonly found in marshes and along estuaries.
