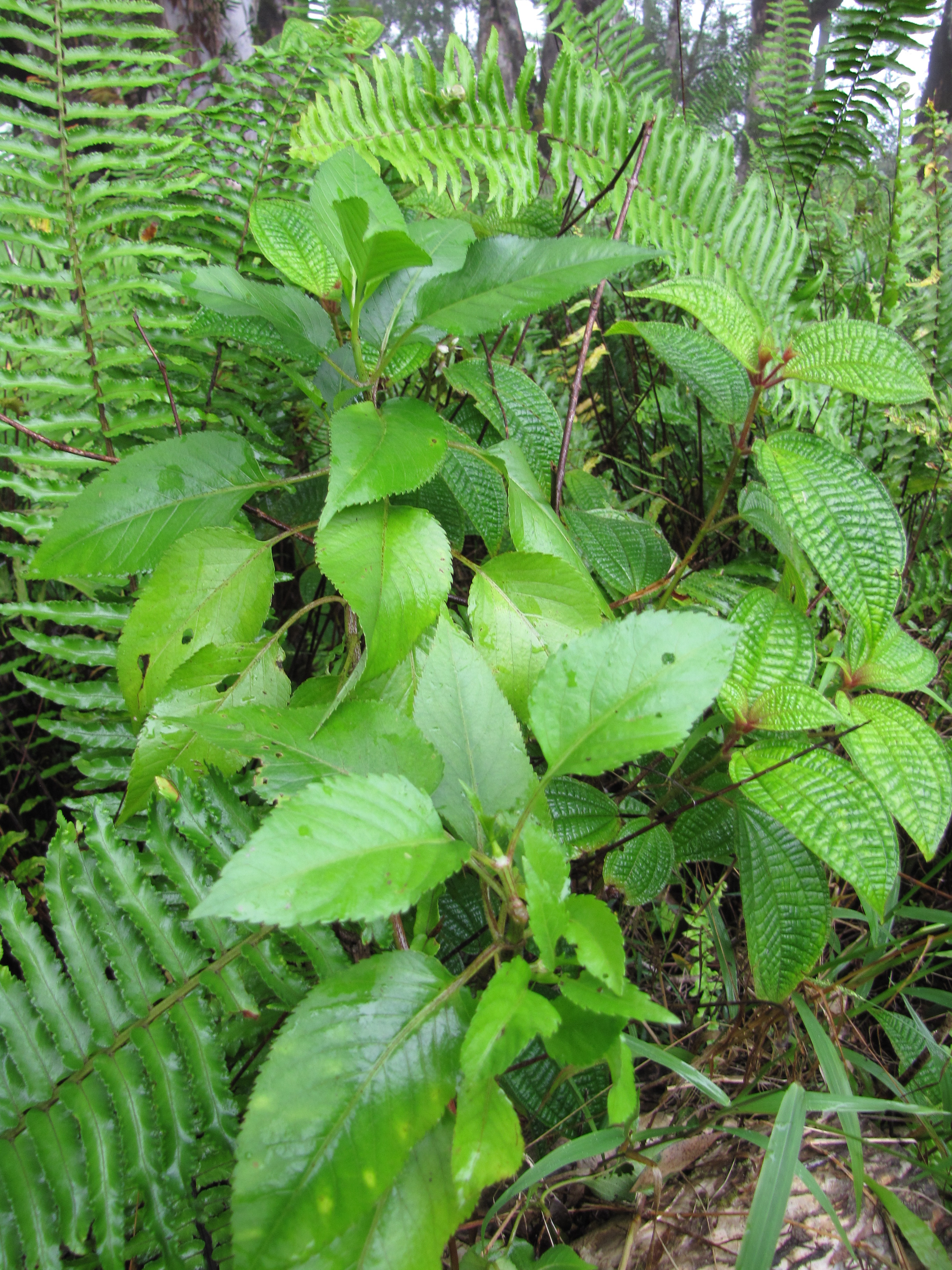

Conservation status
- Vulnerable (IUCN 3.1)

Scientific classification
- Kingdom: Plantae
- Clade: Tracheophytes
- Clade: Angiosperms
- Clade: Eudicots
- Clade: Asterids
- Order: Asterales
- Family: Asteraceae
- Genus: Bidens
- Species: B. conjuncta

Binomial name
- Bidens conjuncta Sherff

= Bidens conjuncta =

Bog beggarticks

Species of flowering plant

Bidens conjuncta, the bog beggarticks, is a species of flowering plant in the family Asteraceae. It belongs to the genus Bidens, collectively called kokoʻolau or koʻokoʻolau in the Hawaiian language. Bidens conjuncta is found only on western Maui.

Its natural habitat are wet forests and bogs. It is threatened by habitat loss due to the spread of invasive weeds and brush fires.
