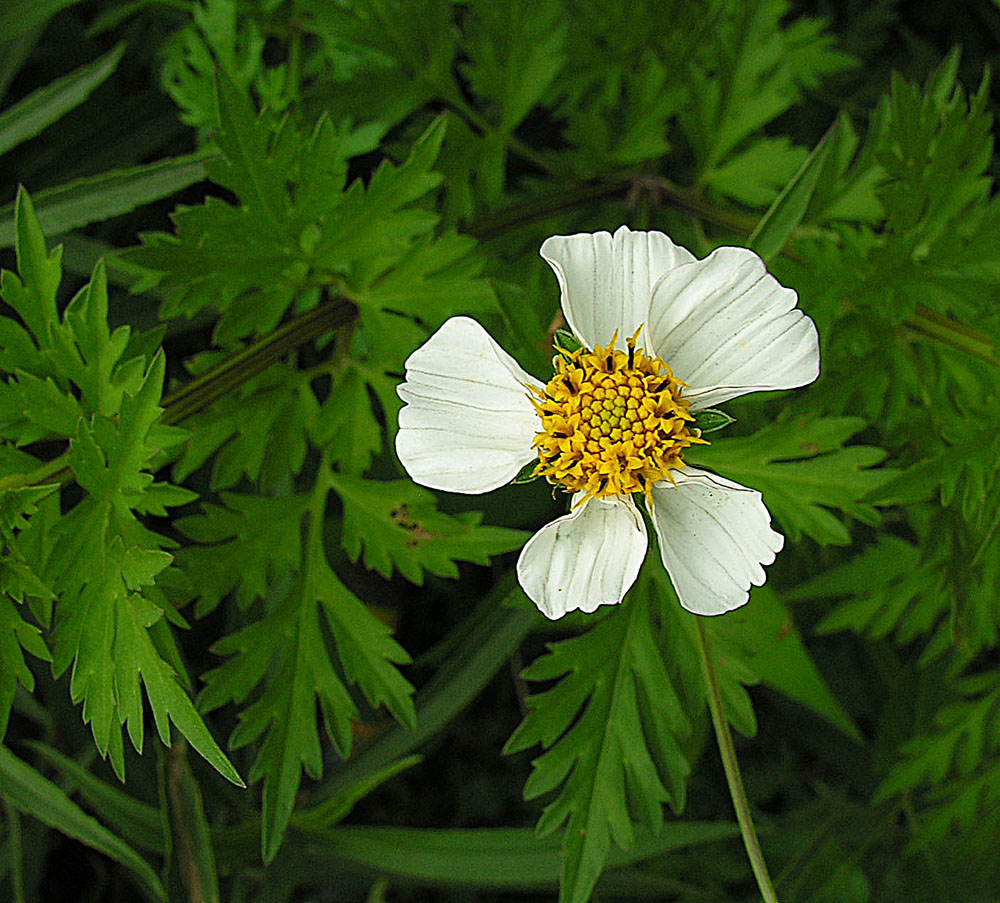
- Photo from Puebla, Mexico

Conservation status
- Secure (NatureServe)

Scientific classification
- Kingdom: Plantae
- Clade: Tracheophytes
- Clade: Angiosperms
- Clade: Eudicots
- Clade: Asterids
- Order: Asterales
- Family: Asteraceae
- Genus: Bidens
- Species: B. bigelovii

Binomial name
- Bidens bigelovii A.Gray

Synonyms
- Synonymy: Bidens bigelovii var. typica Sherff; Bidens amphicarpa Sherff; Bidens anthriscoides var. angustiloba DC; Bidens bigelovii var. angustiloba (DC.) R.E.Ballard ex Melchert; Bidens bigelovii var. pueblensis Sherff; Bidens duranginensis Sherff; Bidens oligocarpa Sherff; Bidens oligocarpa var. viereckii Sherff; Bidens pueblensis (Sherff) Melchert

= Bidens bigelovii =

Species of flowering plant

Bidens bigelovii, commonly called Bigelow's beggarticks, is an annual herbaceous flowering plant in the Asteraceae family. It is native to the southwestern and south-central United States (Arizona, New Mexico, Texas, Oklahoma, Colorado) and as far south as Oaxaca, Mexico.

== Description ==
Bidens bigelovii is an annual herbaceous flowering plant that grows between 10 and 80 cm (3.9 and 31.5 in) tall. It usually flowers with just one bloom with around 13-25 yellow disc florets and sometimes up to five white ray florets. The leaves are 2.5 to 9 cm long by 1.5 to 3.5 cm wide, and are attached to petioles 0.5-2.5 cm in length.

== Distribution and habitat ==
Bidens bigelovii has been found in the United States (Arizona, Colorado, New Mexico, Oklahoma, Texas), Mexico, Guatemala, and Panama. It typically grows along streams or other wet sites at elevations of 900–2000 metres from sea level.

== Conservation ==
As of November 2024, NatureServe listed Bidens bigelovii as Secure (G5) worldwide. In individual states within the United States, it is listed as Possibly Extirpated (SH) in Oklahoma, Vulnerable (S3) in Colorado, and No Status Rank (SNR) in New Mexico, Texas, and Arizona.

== Taxonomy ==
Bidens bigelovii was named by Asa Gray and first described in 1859 in the Report on the United States and Mexican boundary survey.
