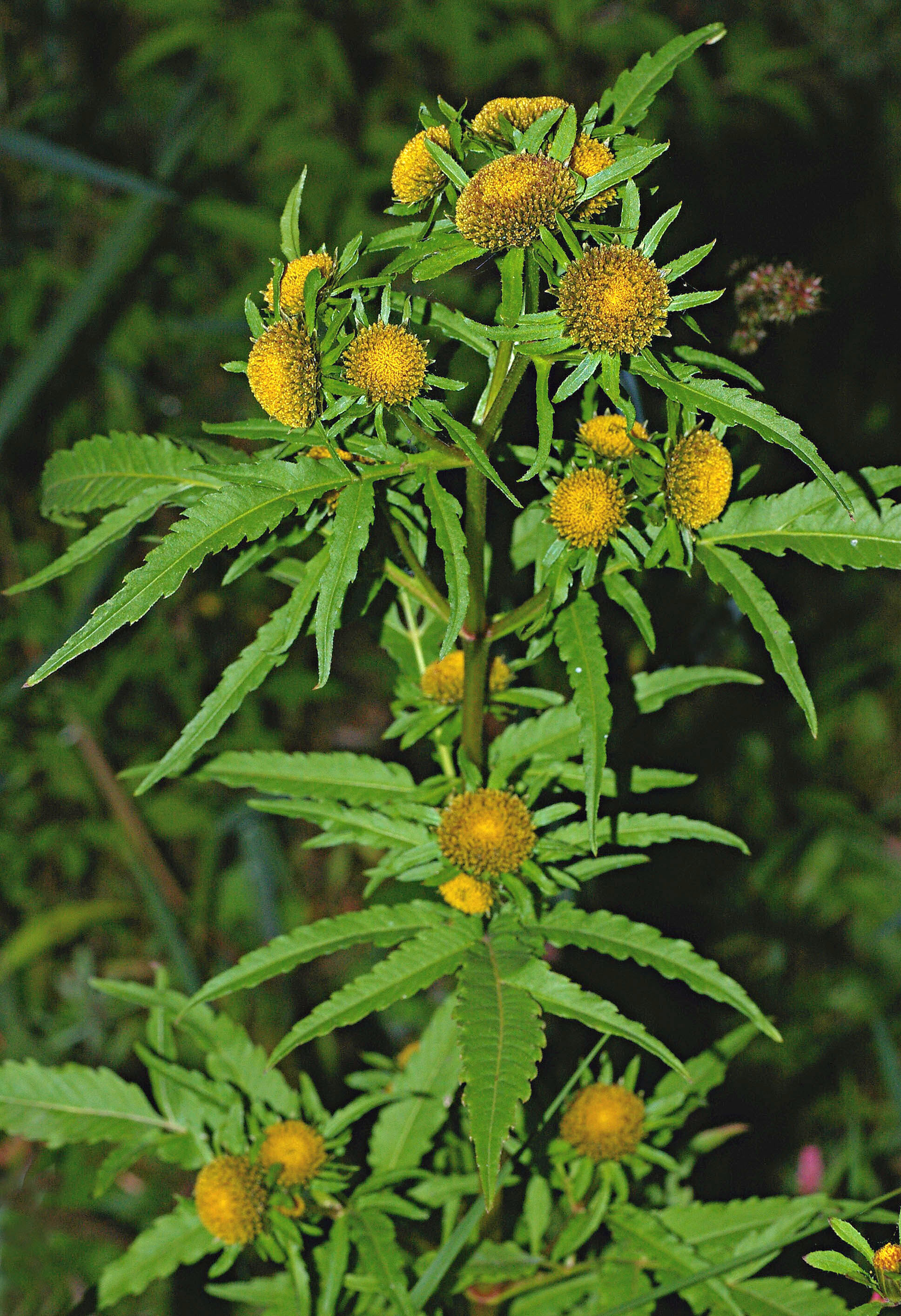

Scientific classification
- Kingdom: Plantae
- Clade: Tracheophytes
- Clade: Angiosperms
- Clade: Eudicots
- Clade: Asterids
- Order: Asterales
- Family: Asteraceae
- Genus: Bidens
- Species: B. radiata

Binomial name
- Bidens radiata Thuill.

= Bidens radiata =

Species of flowering plant

Bidens radiata is a species of flowering plant belonging to the family Asteraceae.

Its native range is Europe to Russian Far East and Korea.
