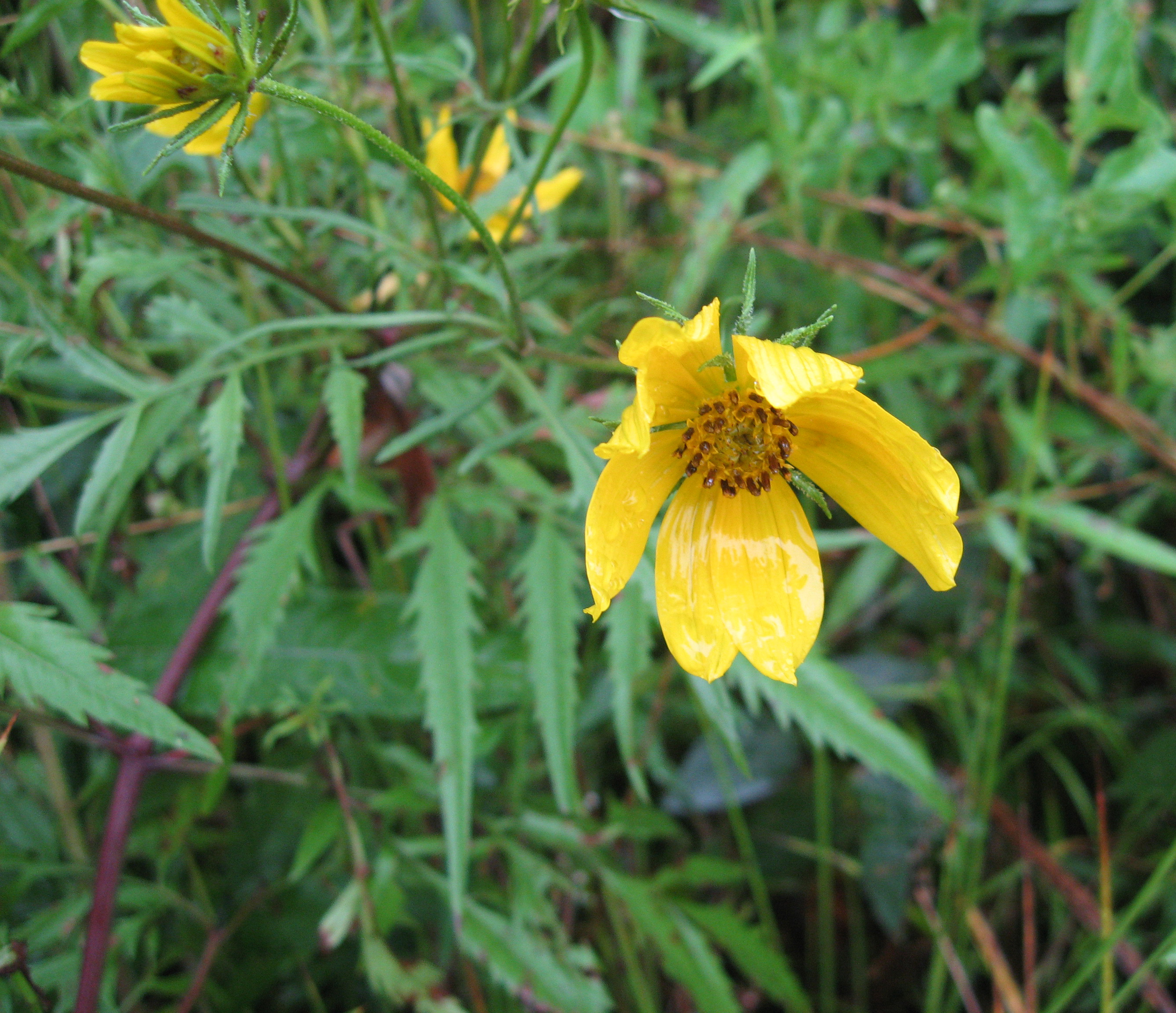

Scientific classification
- Kingdom: Plantae
- Clade: Tracheophytes
- Clade: Angiosperms
- Clade: Eudicots
- Clade: Asterids
- Order: Asterales
- Family: Asteraceae
- Genus: Bidens
- Species: B. polylepis

Binomial name
- Bidens polylepis S.F.Blake

Synonyms
- Bidens involucrata (Nutt.) Britton 1893, illegitimate name not Phil. 1891; Bidens involucrata var. retrorsa Sherff; Coreopsis involucrata Nutt.

= Bidens polylepis =

Species of flowering plant

Bidens polylepis is a North American species of flowering plant in the family Asteraceae. It is native to south-central Canada (Ontario) and to the eastern and central United States (from Michigan and New Jersey south and west to South Carolina, New Mexico, and Colorado).

Bidens polylepis is an annual herb up to 100 cm (40 inches) tall. It produces as many as 3 yellow flower heads per branch, each head containing both disc florets and ray florets. The species grows in marshes, flood plains, and disturbed sites.

Bidens polylepis is very closely related to Bidens aristosa, and they are known to intergrade over a broad geographic range. Because of this, they have been combined as a single entity by some authors.
