= Bidens =

- Bidens tripartita

Scientific classification
- Kingdom: Plantae
- Clade: Embryophytes
- Clade: Tracheophytes
- Clade: Spermatophytes
- Clade: Angiosperms
- Clade: Eudicots
- Clade: Asterids
- Order: Asterales
- Family: Asteraceae
- Subfamily: Asteroideae
- Tribe: Coreopsideae
- Genus: Bidens; L.

Synonyms
- Adenolepis Less.; Campylotheca Cass.; Delucia DC.; Diodonta Nutt.; Dolichotheca Cass.; Edwarsia Neck., not validly publ.; Forbicina Ség., nom. superfl.; Gemella Hill; Heliophthalmum Raf.; Kerneria Moench; Megalodonta Greene; Microlecane Sch.Bip. ex Benth. & Hook.f.; Pluridens Neck., not validly publ.; Prestinaria Sch.Bip. ex Hochst., not validly publ.

Genus of plants

Bidens is a genus of flowering plants in the aster family, Asteraceae. The genus include roughly 230 species which are distributed worldwide. Despite their global distribution, the systematics and taxonomy of the genus has been described as complicated and unorganized. The common names beggarticks, black jack, burr marigolds, cobbler's pegs, Spanish needles, stickseeds, tickseeds and tickseed sunflowers refer to the fruits of the plants, most of which are bristly and barbed. The generic name refers to the same character; Bidens comes from the Latin bi ("two") and dens ("tooth").

== Phylogeny, taxonomy and diversity ==
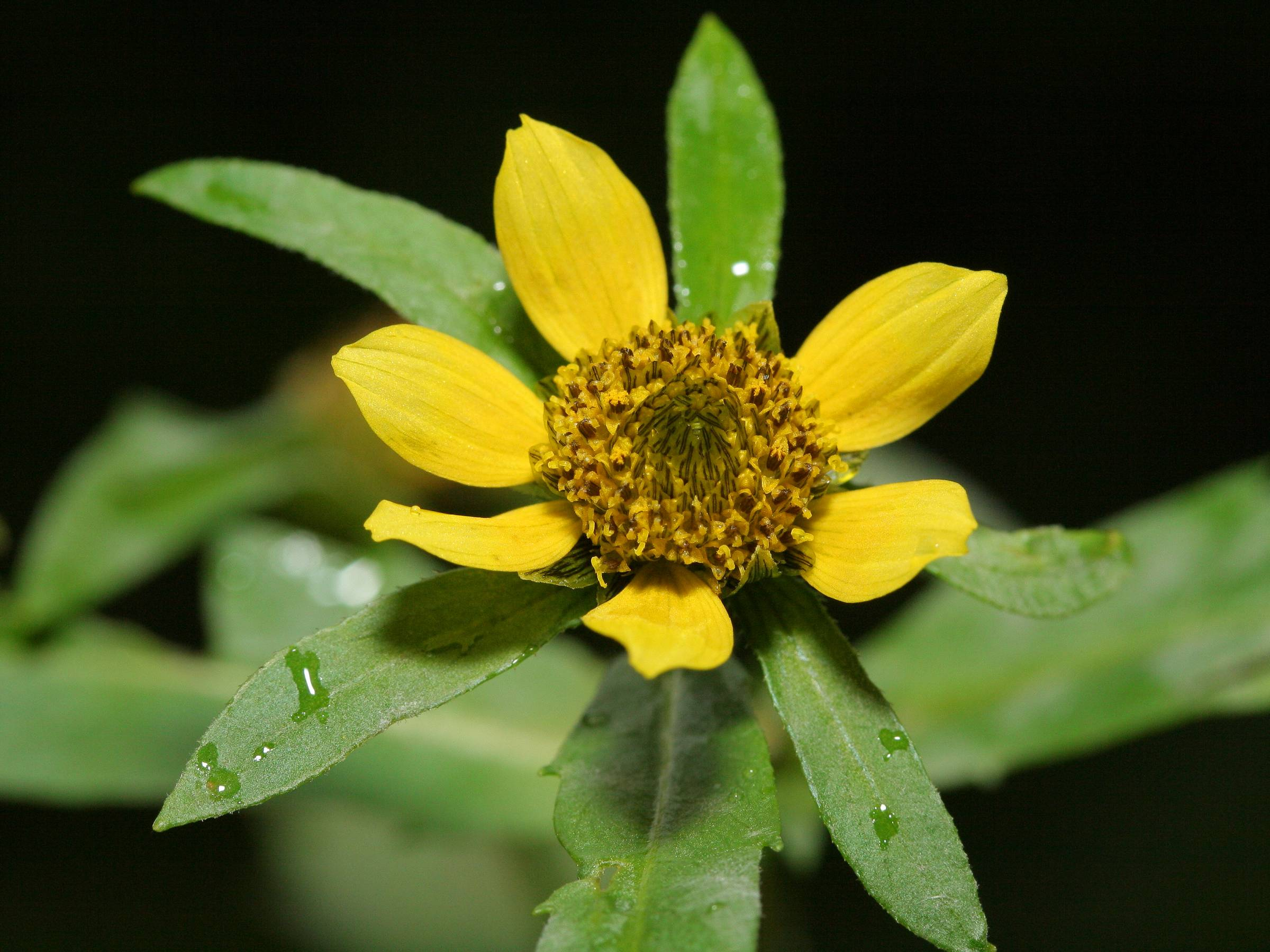
Bidens cernua

Despite their global distribution, the systematics and taxonomy of the genus has been described as complicated and unorganized. The genus include roughly 230 species.

Bidens is closely related to the American genus Coreopsis, and the genera are sometimes difficult to tell apart; in addition, neither is monophyletic.

=== Species ===
Species include:

- Bidens alba (L.) DC. – romerillo
- Bidens amplectens Sherff – Waiʻanae kokoʻolau
- Bidens amplissima Greene – Vancouver Island beggarticks
- Bidens aristosa (Michx.) Britt. – bearded beggarticks, long-bracted beggarticks, tickseed sunflower, western tickseed
- Bidens asymmetrica (Levl.) Sherff – Koʻolau kokoʻolau, Ko'olau Range beggarticks
- Bidens aurea (Ait.) Sherff – Arizona beggarticks
- Bidens beckii – Beck's water-marigold, Henderson's water-marigold, Oregon water-marigold
- Bidens bidentoides (Nutt.) Britt. – Delmarva beggarticks
- Bidens bigelovii A.Gray – Bigelow's beggarticks
- Bidens bipinnata L. – Spanish needles, hemlock beggarticks, gui zheng cao (Chinese: 鬼針草)
- Bidens biternata
- Bidens cabopulmensis
- Bidens campylotheca Sch.Bip.– viper beggarticks
- Bidens cernua L. (syn. B. glaucescens Greene) – nodding beggarticks, nodding bur-marigold
- Bidens cervicata Sherff – Kauaʻi beggarticks
- Bidens chippii (M.B.Moss) Mesfin
- Bidens conjuncta Sherff – bog beggarticks
- Bidens connata Muhl. ex Willd. – purplestem beggarticks
- Bidens coronata (L.) Britt. – crowned beggarticks
- Bidens cosmoides (A.Gray) Sherff – cosmosflower beggarticks, poʻola nui
- Bidens cynapiifolia Kunth – West Indian beggarticks, alfilerillo
- Bidens discoidea (Torr. & A.Gray) Britt. – discoid beggarticks, small beggarticks, swamp beggarticks, few-bracted beggarticks
- Bidens eatonii Fern. – Eaton's beggarticks, bident d'Eaton
- Bidens ferulifolia (Jacq.) DC. – Apache beggarticks, fern-leaved beggarticks
- Bidens forbesii Sherff – coastal bluff beggarticks
- Bidens frondosa L. – devil's beggarticks, devil's pitchfork, devil's bootjack, pitchfork weed, common beggarticks, sticktights. Pitchfork weed (B. frondosa) is considered to be a weed in New Zealand.
- Bidens gardneri Baker – ridge beggarticks
- Bidens hawaiensis A.Gray – Hawaiʻi beggarticks
- Bidens henryi Sherff
- Bidens heterodoxa (Fern.) Fern. & H.St.John – Connecticut beggarticks, bident différent
- Bidens heterosperma Gray – Rocky Mountain beggarticks
- Bidens hillebrandiana (Drake) O.Deg. – seacliff beggarticks
- Bidens hyperborea Greene – estuary beggarticks, coastal beggarticks, northern estuarine beggarticks, seacliff beggarticks
- Bidens laevis (L.) B.S.P. – smooth beggarticks, smooth bur-marigold, larger bur-marigold. Smooth beggarticks (B. laevis) is a common fall flower in the southeastern United States.
- Bidens lemmonii Gray – Lemmon's beggarticks
- Bidens leptocephala Sherff – few-flowered beggarticks
- Bidens leptophylla
- Bidens macrocarpa (Gray) Sherff – large-fruited beggarticks
- Bidens macroptera (Sch.Bip. ex Chiov.) Mesfin
- Bidens mannii T.G.J.Rayner
- Bidens mauiensis (Gray) Sherff – Maui beggarticks
- Bidens maximowicziana
- Bidens menziesii (Gray) Sherff – Mauna Loa beggarticks
- Bidens meyeri V.A.Funk & K.R.Wood
- Bidens micrantha Gaud. – grassland beggarticks
  - B. micrantha ssp. kalealaha Nagata & Ganders – Kalealaha beggarticks
- Bidens mitis (Michx.) Sherff – small-fruited beggarticks
- Bidens molokaiensis (Hillebr.) Sherff – Molokaʻi beggarticks, wedge beggarticks
- Bidens × multiceps Fassett
- Bidens nudata Brandegee – Cape beggar's tick, Baja tickseed
- Bidens parviflora
- Bidens pachyloma – Meskel Flower
- Bidens pilosa S.F.Blake – hairy beggarticks
- Bidens polylepis S.F.Blake
- Bidens populifolia Sherff – Oʻahu beggarticks
- Bidens radiata
- Bidens reptans (L.) G.Don – manzanilla trepador
- Bidens sandvicensis Less. – shrubland beggarticks
- Bidens schimperi Sch.Bip.
- Bidens simplicifolia C.H.Wright
- Bidens socorrensis
- Bidens squarrosa Kunth
- Bidens subalternans DC.
- Bidens tenuisecta A.Gray – slim-lobed beggarticks
- Bidens torta Sherff – corkscrew beggarticks
- Bidens trichosperma (Michx.) Britton – crowned beggarticks
- Bidens tripartita L. (syn. B. acuta, B. comosa) – three-lobed beggarticks, three-part beggarticks, leafy-bracted beggarticks, trifid bur-marigold
- Bidens triplinervia Kunth
  - B. triplinervia var. macrantha (Wedd.) Sherff
- Bidens valida Sherff – Mt. Kahili beggarticks
- Bidens vulgata Greene – big devil's beggarticks, tall beggarticks, tall bur-marigold, western sticktight
- Bidens wiebkei Sherff – Wiebke's beggarticks

=== Formerly placed here ===
- Cosmos atrosanguineus (Hook.) Voss (as B. atrosanguinea (Hook.) Ortgies ex Regel)
- Cosmos bipinnatus Cav. (as B. formosa (Bonato) Sch.Bip.)
- Melanthera nivea (L.) Small (as B. nivea L.)
- Salmea scandens (L.) DC. (as B. scandens L.)
- Thelesperma megapotamicum (Spreng.) Kuntze (as B. megapotamica Spreng.)

== Distribution ==
Bidens includes roughly 230 species which are distributed worldwide throughout many tropical and warm temperate regions. Species occur in the Americas, Africa, Polynesia, Europe and Asia.

Bidens are zoochorous; their seeds will stick to clothing, fur or feathers, and be carried to new habitat. This has enabled them to colonize a wide range, including many oceanic islands. Some of these species occur only in a very restricted range and several are now threatened with extinction, notably in the Hawaiian Islands. Due to the absence of native mammals on these islands, some of the oceanic island taxa have reduced burrs, evolving features that seem to aid in dispersal by the wind instead.

== Human use and interactions ==
Nodding beggarticks (B. cernua) and hairy beggarticks (B. pilosa) are useful as honey plants. Several Bidens species are used as food by the caterpillars of certain Lepidoptera, such as the noctuid moth Hypercompe hambletoni and the brush-footed butterfly Vanessa cardui, the painted lady.

The Bidens mottle virus, a plant pathogen, was first isolated from B. pilosa, and it infects many other Asteraceae and plants of other families.

Native Hawaiians drink a special tea out of their leaves (known collectively as koʻokoʻolau) back when they were abundant in Hawaii.

== Photo gallery ==
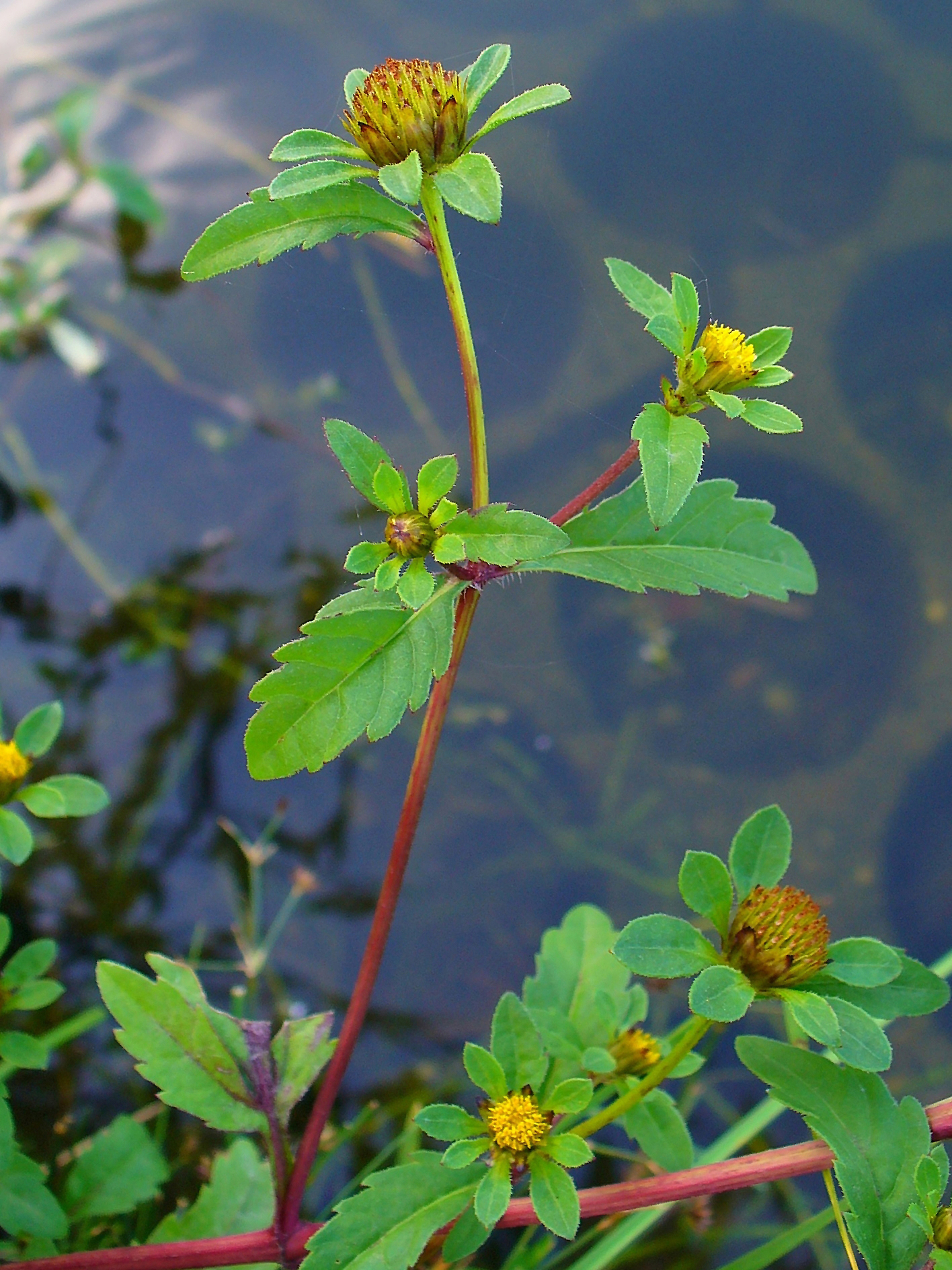

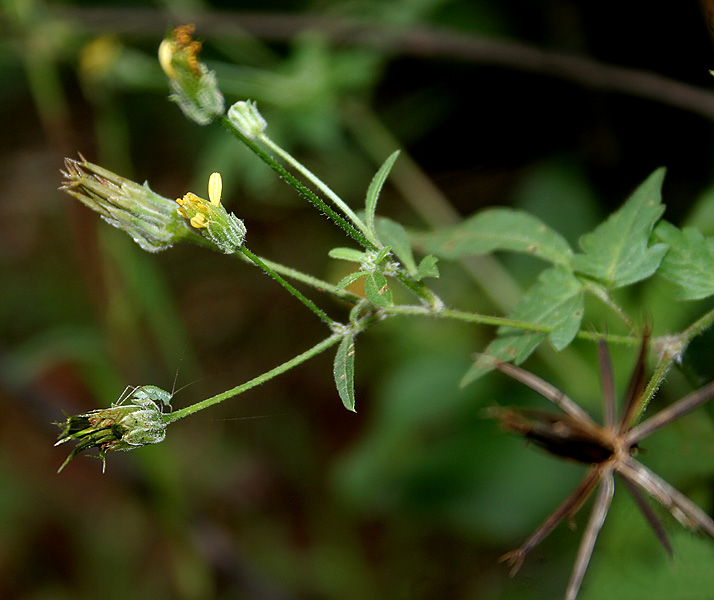

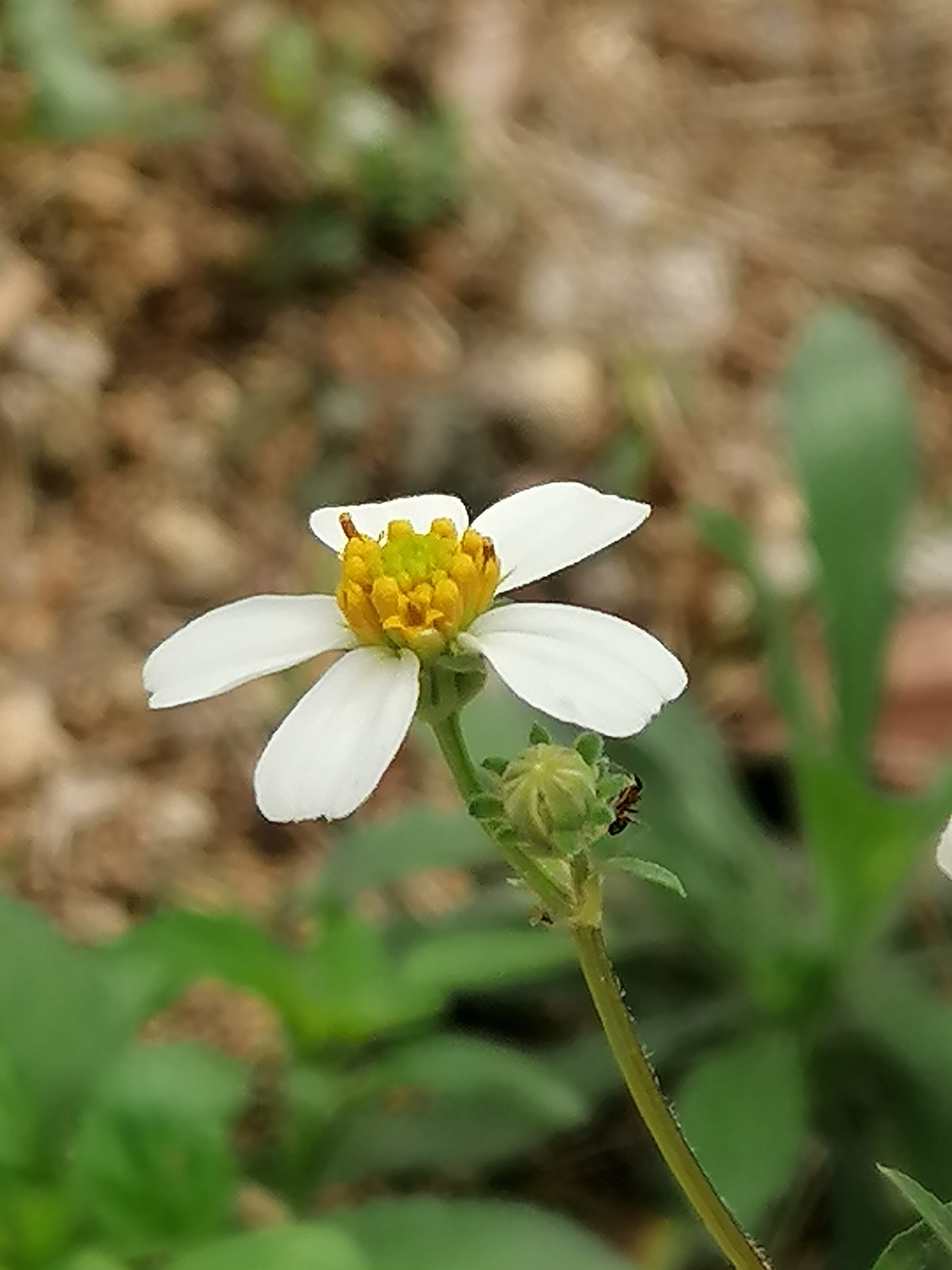

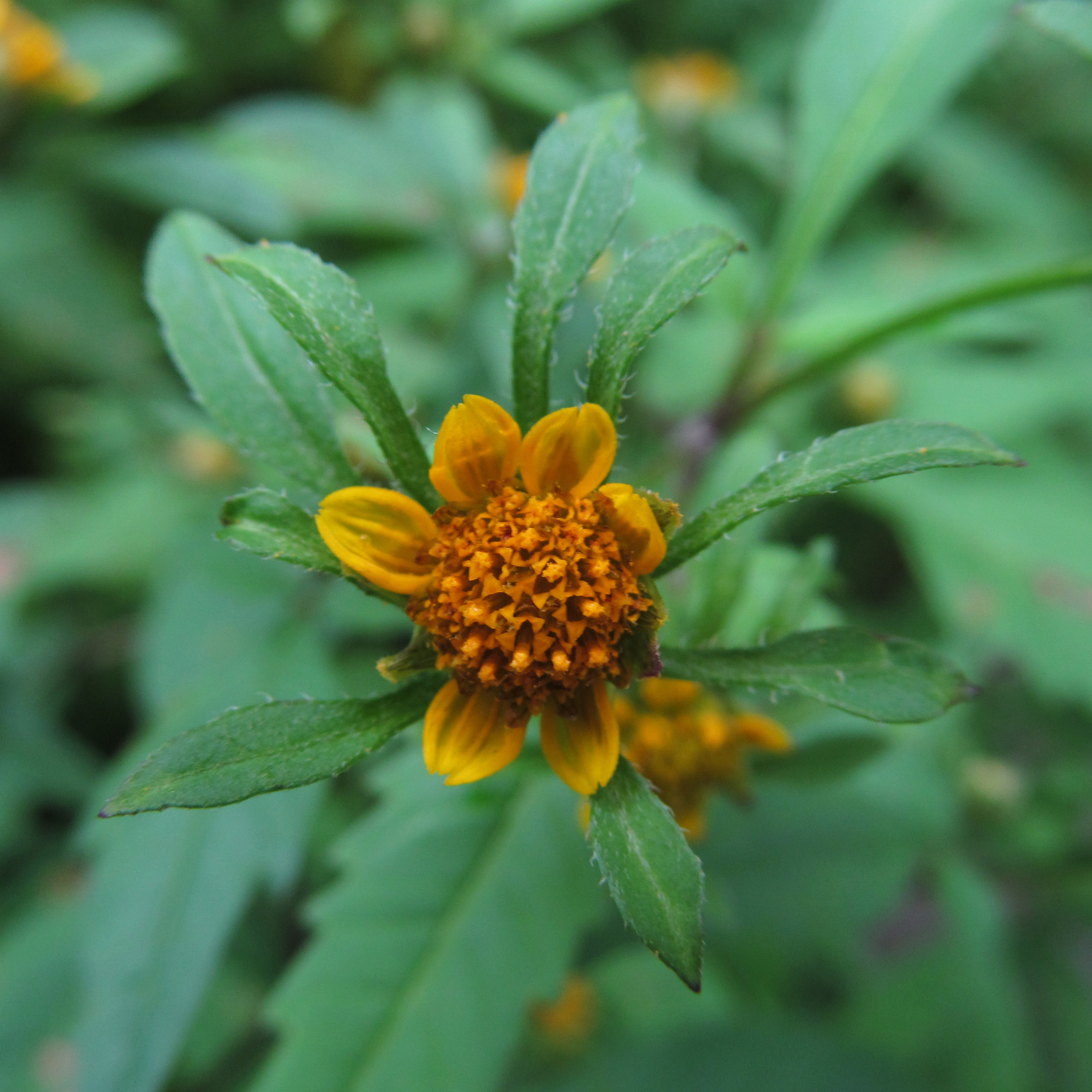

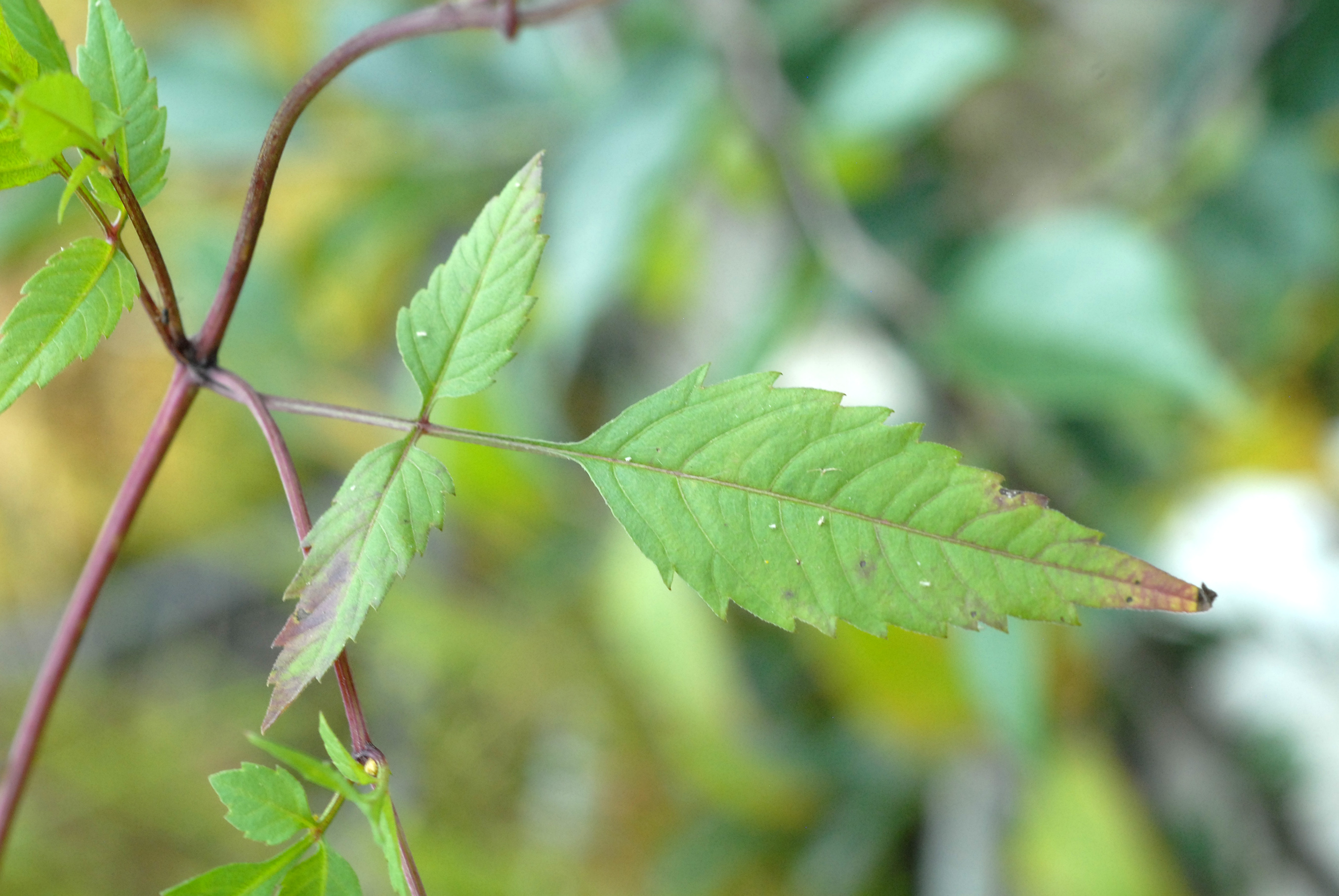

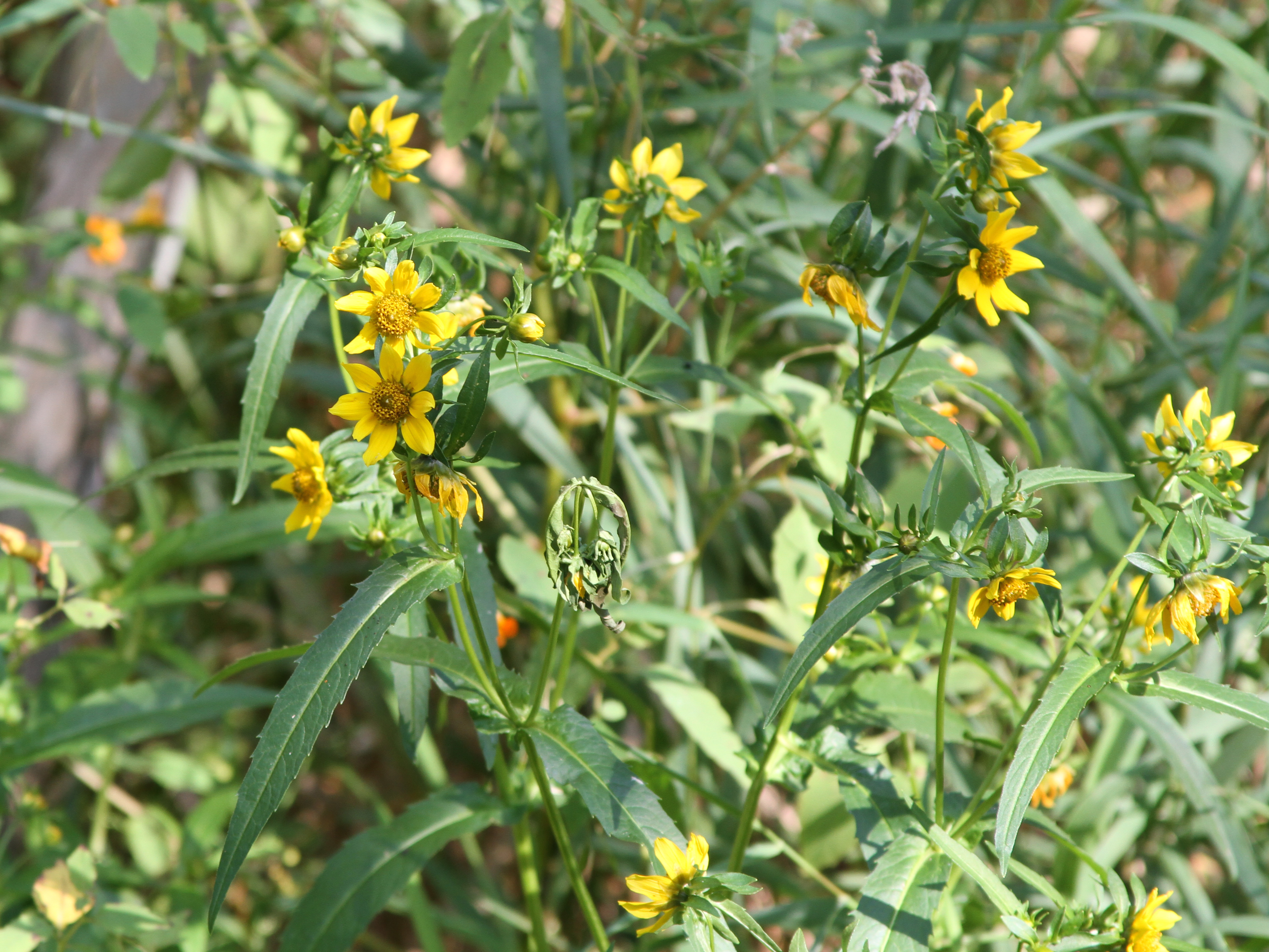

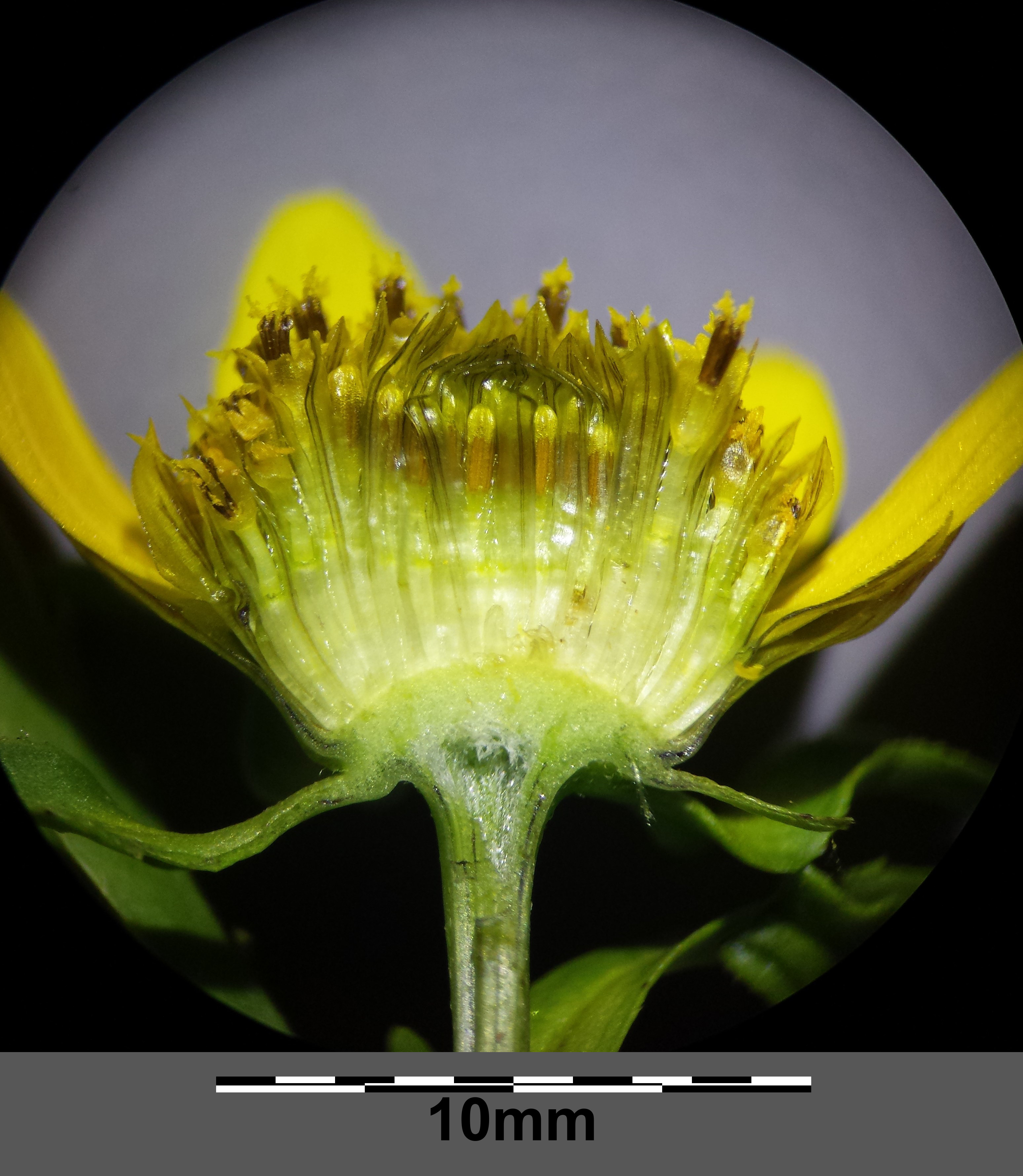
