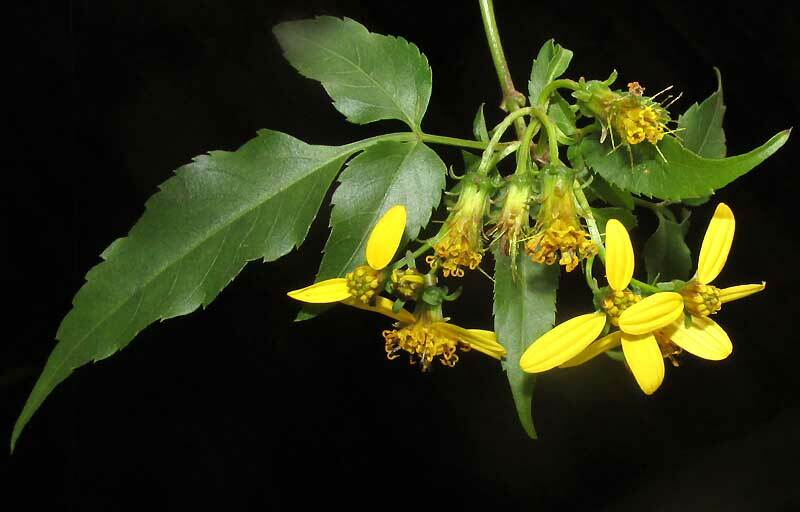
- Bidens reptans flowering heads and leaves

Scientific classification
- Kingdom: Plantae
- Clade: Tracheophytes
- Clade: Angiosperms
- Clade: Eudicots
- Clade: Asterids
- Order: Asterales
- Family: Asteraceae
- Genus: Bidens
- Species: B. reptans

Binomial name
- Bidens reptans (L.) G.Don

= Bidens reptans =

Species of plant

Bidens reptans is a species of scrambling perennial plant of the Neotropical realm belonging to the family Asteraceae

== Description ==
Bidens reptans displays these main features:

- It can be a herbaceous, perennial that creeps along the ground, lies atop other vegetation, and it can climb into trees as a woody liana developing branches which dangle.
- Leaves arise opposite one another on stems and may be simple with no subdivisions, or have up to 7 leaflets, which are up to 14 cm (5.5 in) long and 12 cm (4.7 in) wide.
- Flowering heads are all yellow, with each head producing up to 8 petal-like ray florets along the margins, and with an "eye" of up to 30 disk florets with cylindrical corollas.
- The involucre from which the florets emerge consists of two dissimilar series of bracts; there are 5–8, somewhat fleshy, green, external ones and 8-10 interior ones which are thinner in texture and yellowish green.
- The one-seeded, cypsela-type fruits are up to 12 mm (0.5 in) long and 1.4 mm (0.06 in) wide, topped with 2 sharp awns, with each awn bearing backward-pointing barbs.

== Distribution ==
Bidens reptans is native to the Americas from Mexico and the Caribbean south through Central America into South America as far south as Argentina and Bolivia.

== Habitat ==
Bidens reptans occurs in a wide variety of environments, from tropical deciduous forest, oak and pine-oak forest, mangroves, forests beside water bodies, secondary forests and pastures.

== Human interactions ==
=== Traditional medicinal ===
In Jamaica, Bidens reptans is reported as used for the common cold and flu. In Costa Rica the leaf is considered medicinal. In Mexico the plant is used to treat injuries.

=== Honey production ===
In west-central Mexico, Bidens reptans is listed among the most desirable species of Asteraceae as a source of both nectar and pollen.

== Taxonomy ==
The basionym for Bidens reptans is Coreopsis reptans, published in 1759 by Linnaeus."

=== Synonyms ===
In 2026, the following synonyms were accepted for Bidens reptans G.Don:

- Bidens boquetiensis Roseman (1990)
- Bidens brittonii Sherff (1913)
- Bidens coreopsidis DC (1836)
- Bidens coreopsidis var. reptans (L.) DC. (1836)
- Bidens dissecta (O.E.Schulz) Sherff (1913)
- Bidens izabalensis Roseman (1990)
- Bidens reptans var. bipartita O.E.Schulz (1911)
- Bidens reptans var. brittonii (Sherff) O.E.Schulz ex Urb. (1929)
- Bidens reptans var. coreopsidis (DC.) Sherff (1948)
- Bidens reptans var. dissecta O.E.Schulz (1911)
- Bidens reptans var. tomentosa O.E.Schulz (1911)
- Bidens reptans var. urbanii (Greenm.) O.E.Schulz (1911)
- Bidens rubifolia var. coreopsidis (DC.) Baker (1884)
- Bidens urbanii Greenm. (1907)
- Coreopsis chrysantha Spreng. (1826)
- Coreopsis reptans L. (1759)
- Coreopsis variifolia Salisb. (1796)

=== A variety in alternative taxonomy ===
Sometimes the taxon Bidens squarrosa var. squarrosa is listed as a variety of Bidens reptans. This odd situation is recognized as an alternative approach in botanical literature to reflect the two taxons' high degree of similarity and common ancestry.

=== Etymology ===
The genus name Bidens is from the New Latin bi, meaning "two", and dens meaning "tooth"; so "two-toothed", alluding to the two bristle-like awns atop the original species' cypselae.

The species name reptans comes from the Latin reptāre, meaning "to creep", reflecting the fact that when not climbing the species creeps along the ground.

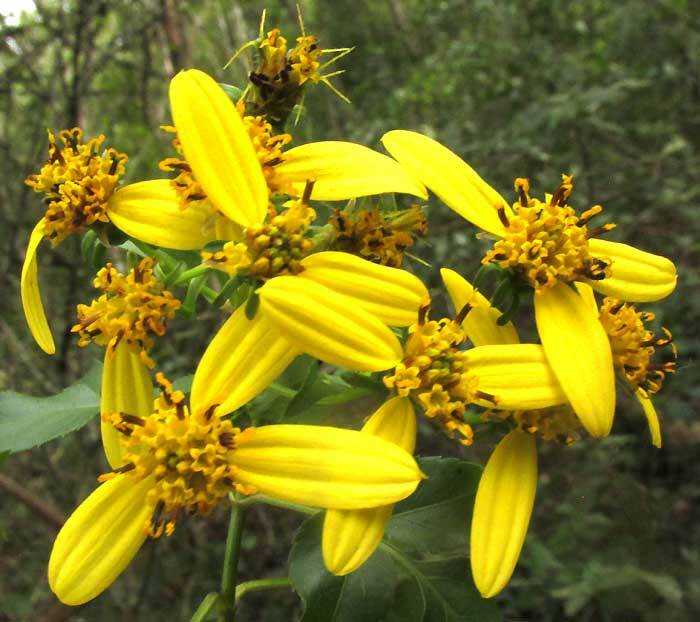
Bidens reptans flowering heads

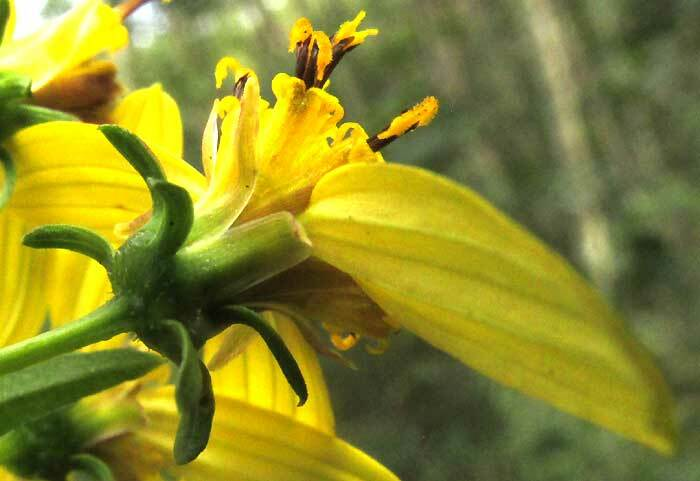
Bidens reptans 2 series of involucral bracts

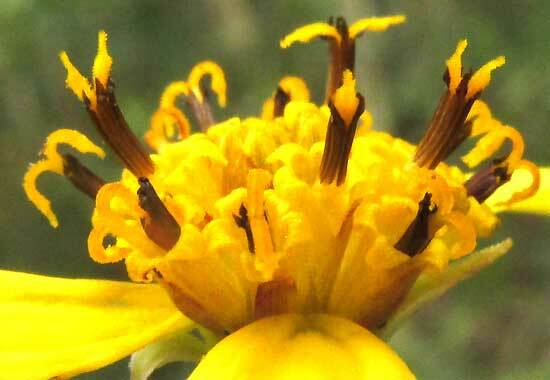
Bidens reptans disk florets

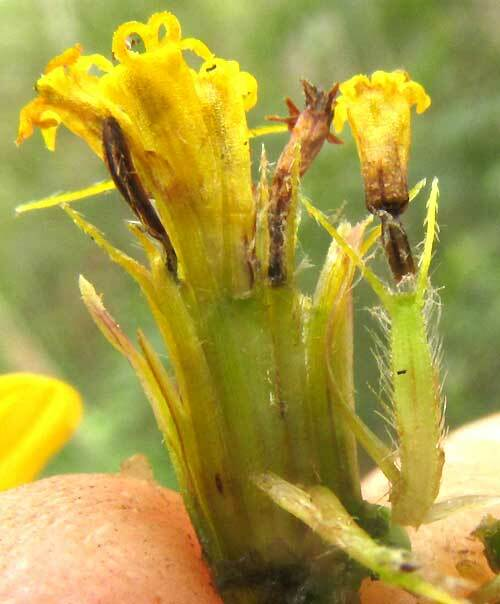
Bidens reptans cypselae awns with backward-pointing barbs

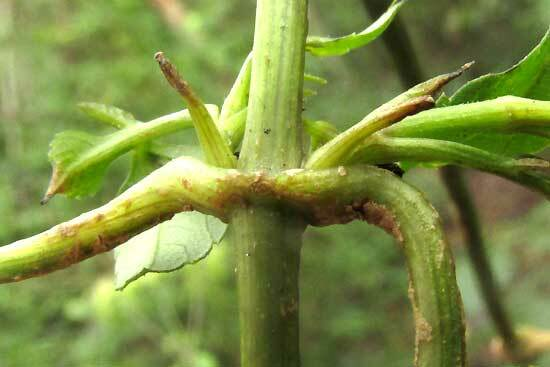
Bidens reptans spine-like appendages

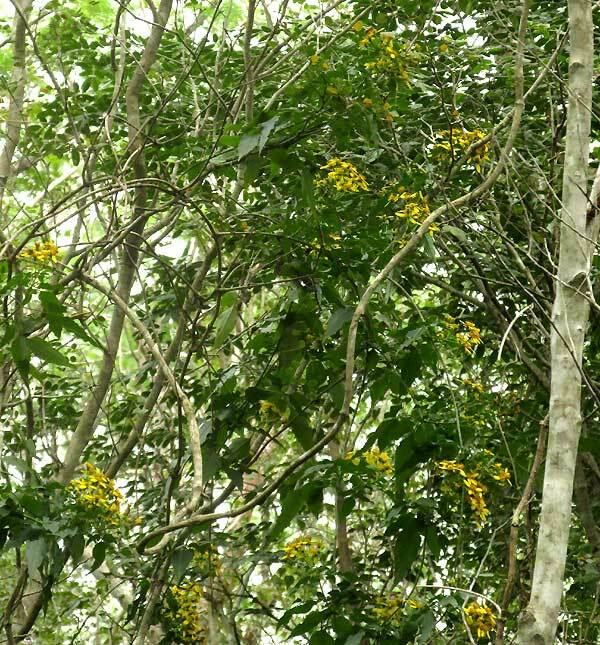
Bidens reptans climbing into forest
