= Bidens leptocephala =

Conservation status
- Secure (NatureServe)

Scientific classification
- Kingdom: Plantae
- Clade: Tracheophytes
- Clade: Angiosperms
- Clade: Eudicots
- Clade: Asterids
- Order: Asterales
- Family: Asteraceae
- Genus: Bidens
- Species: B. leptocephala

Binomial name
- Bidens leptocephala Sherff

Synonyms
- Bidens leptocephala var. hammerlyae Sherff; Bidens leptocephala var. typica Sherff; Bidens leptocephala var. ulinei Sherff

Species of flowering plant

Bidens leptocephala, commonly known as the fewflower beggarticks, is an annual herbaceous flowering plant in the Asteraceae family. It is native to the southwestern United States (Arizona, New Mexico, western Texas) and northern Mexico (Chihuahua, Sonora, Baja California, Baja California Sur).

== Description ==
Bidens leptocephala is an annual herb that typically grows between 10 and 50 cm (3.9 and 19.7 in) tall. The opposite leaf blades are 2 to 10 cm (0.79 to 3.94 in) long by 1 to 6 cm (0.39 to 2.36 in) wide. They are pinnately divided up to 2 times into linear segments. The leaf petioles are up to 4 cm in length. Flower heads are sometimes borne one at a time or in groups of 2 or 3, each head with whitish or yellowish disc florets and sometimes with up to 3 pale yellow ray florets.

The species mainly flowers in September.

== Distribution and habitat ==
Bidens leptocephala has been found in the United States (Arizona, New Mexico, Texas) and in Mexico (Baja California, Chihuahua). It grows along streams at elevations of 900–1800 metres from sea level.

== Conservation ==
As of November 2024, Bidens leptocephala is listed on NatureServe as Secure (G5) worldwide.

== Taxonomy ==
Bidens leptocephala was first named by Earl Edward Sherff and described in 1917 in Bot. Gaz. 64: 22.
