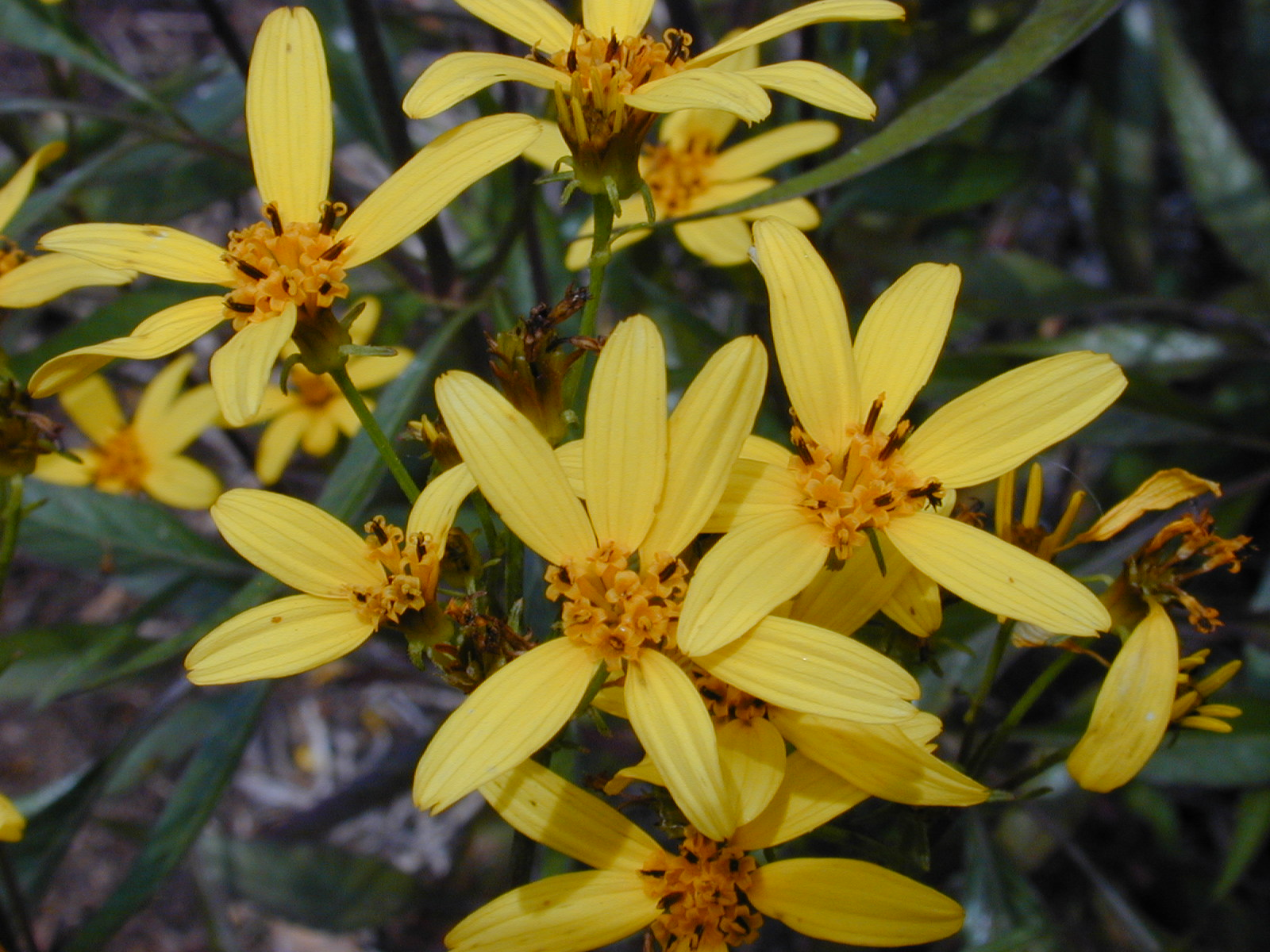
- subsp. kalealaha

Conservation status
- Vulnerable (NatureServe)

Scientific classification
- Kingdom: Plantae
- Clade: Tracheophytes
- Clade: Angiosperms
- Clade: Eudicots
- Clade: Asterids
- Order: Asterales
- Family: Asteraceae
- Genus: Bidens
- Species: B. micrantha

Binomial name
- Bidens micrantha Gaudich.

Synonyms
- Synonymy: Bidens degeneri Sherff; Bidens dichotoma (Hillebrandt) Sherff; Bidens perversa O.Deg. & Sherff; Campylotheca australis Less.; Campylotheca dichotoma Hillebr.; Campylotheca micrantha (Gaudich.) Cass.; Coreopsis dichotoma Drake; Coreopsis micrantha (Gaudich.) A.Gray; Bidens ctenophylla Sherff, Synonym of subsp. ctenophylla; Bidens remyi Drake, Synonym of subsp. ctenophylla; Bidens schizoglossa Sherff, Synonym of subsp. ctenophylla; Bidens distans Sherff, Synonym of subsp. kalealaha

= Bidens micrantha =

Species of flowering plant

Bidens micrantha is a species of flowering plant in the aster family known by the common name grassland beggarticks. It is endemic to the Hawaiian Islands, where it and other Bidens species are known as kōʻokoʻolau. It occurs in many types of habitat on Lānaʻi, Maui, and Hawaiʻi, including rocky cliffs, dry forests, mesic forests, wet forests, and high shrublands.

Subspecies

- B. m. ssp. micrantha (Maui)
- B. m. ssp. ctenophylla (Sherff) Ganders & Nagata (leeward Hualālai on Hawaiʻi)
- B. m. ssp. kalealaha Ganders & Nagata (Lānaʻi and West Maui)

While B. m. ssp. micrantha is considered secure, B. m. ssp. ctenophylla is uncommon and vulnerable and B. m. ssp. kalealaha is rare and federally listed as an endangered species. This is a shrub forming clumps of herbage up to several feet tall. It bears plentiful flower heads with yellow ray florets. It is grown as an ornamental plant and groundcover in Hawaii.

This species was used to make leis and was brewed into tea.
