= Bidens populifolia =

Oʻahu beggarticks

Conservation status
- Vulnerable (IUCN 3.1)

Scientific classification
- Kingdom: Plantae
- Clade: Tracheophytes
- Clade: Angiosperms
- Clade: Eudicots
- Clade: Asterids
- Order: Asterales
- Family: Asteraceae
- Genus: Bidens
- Species: B. populifolia

Binomial name
- Bidens populifolia Sherff

Species of flowering plant

Bidens populifolia, the Oʻahu beggarticks or poplar-leaved bidens, is a species of flowering plant in the family Asteraceae. It belongs to the genus Bidens, collectively called kokoʻolau or koʻokoʻolau in the Hawaiian language. It is found only in the Koʻolau Range on Oʻahu.

Its natural habitat are montane tropical moist forests, tropical moist shrubland, and rocky areas. It is threatened by habitat loss due to the spread of invasive weeds and overgrazing.
