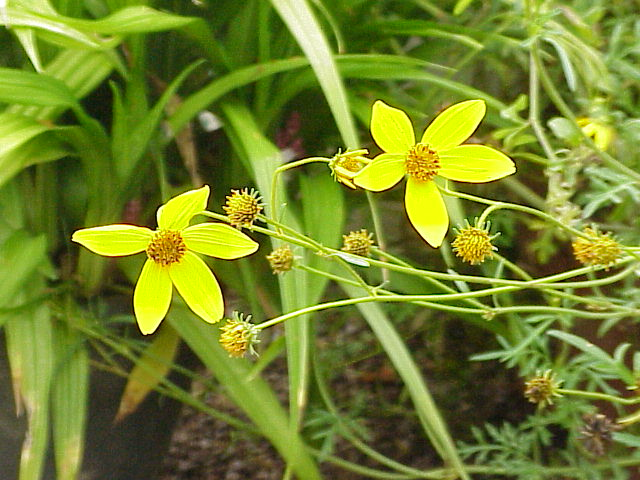

Conservation status
- Secure (NatureServe)

Scientific classification
- Kingdom: Plantae
- Clade: Tracheophytes
- Clade: Angiosperms
- Clade: Eudicots
- Clade: Asterids
- Order: Asterales
- Family: Asteraceae
- Genus: Bidens
- Species: B. ferulifolia

Binomial name
- Bidens ferulifolia (Jacq.) DC.

Synonyms
- Bidens ferulaefolia (Jacq.) Sweet; Bidens foeniculifolia DC.; Bidens ludens A.Gray; Bidens procera D.Don; Coreocarpus ferulifolia Jacq.; Coreocarpus ferulaefolia Jacq.; Coreopsis angustifulia Pav. ex D.Don, not validly published; Coreopsis ferulacea Tilli, not validly published; Coreopsis foeniculacea Moc. & Sessé ex DC., not validly published; Coreopsis incurva Moench, rejected name; Kerneria ferulifolia (Jacq.) Cass.; Kerneria ferulaefolia (Jacq.) Cass.

= Bidens ferulifolia =

North American plant species

Bidens ferulifolia is a North American plant species in the family Asteraceae. Common names include Apache beggarticks and fern-leaved beggarticks.

== Distribution ==
Bidens ferulifolia is native to Mexico.
