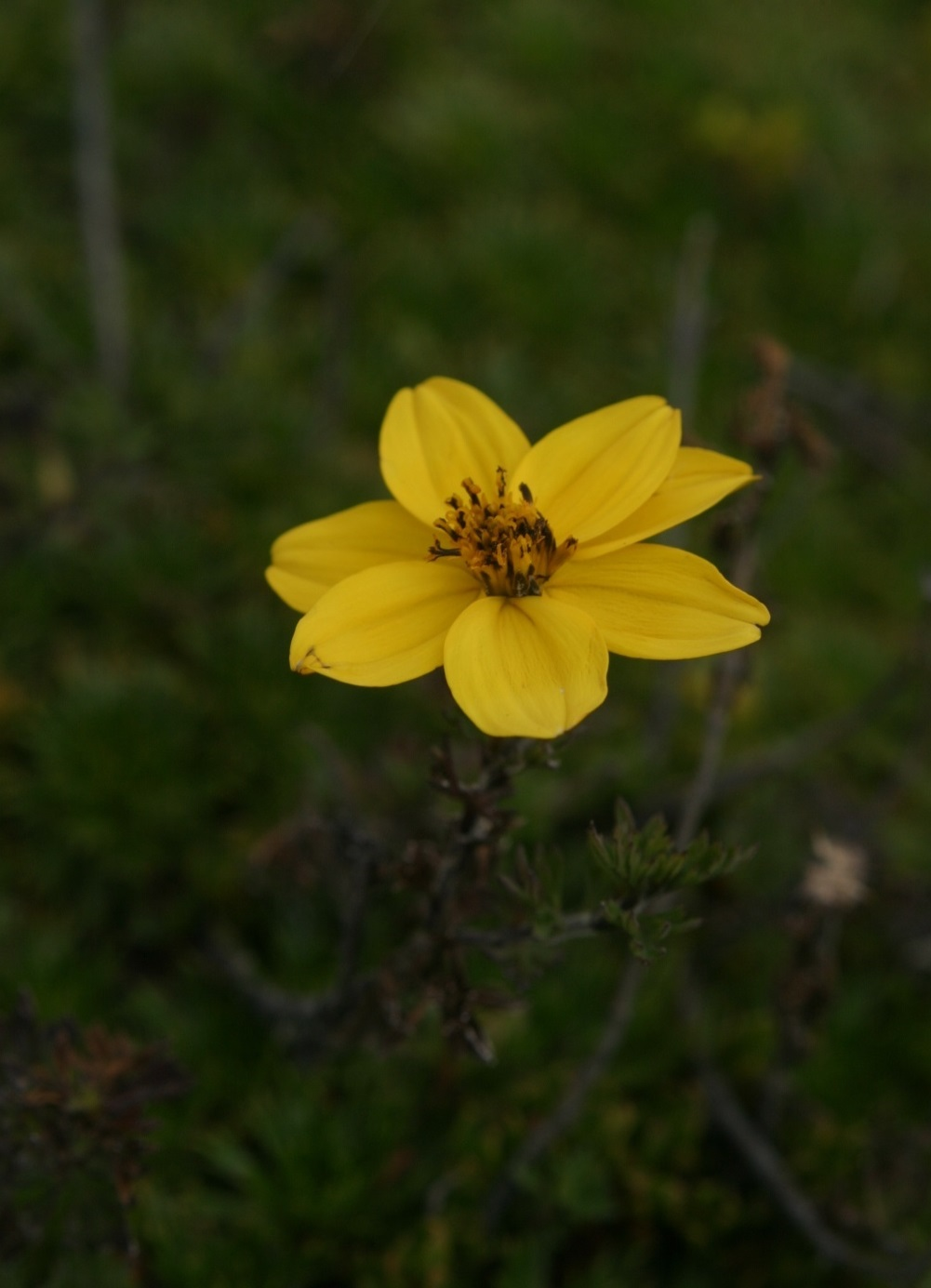

Scientific classification
- Kingdom: Plantae
- Clade: Tracheophytes
- Clade: Angiosperms
- Clade: Eudicots
- Clade: Asterids
- Order: Asterales
- Family: Asteraceae
- Genus: Bidens
- Species: B. triplinervia

Binomial name
- Bidens triplinervia Kunth

Synonyms
- Synonymy: Bidens affinis Klotzsch & Otto; Bidens artemisiifolia Poepp. & Endl.; Bidens attenuata Sherff; Bidens canescens Bertol.; Bidens consolidaefolia Turcz.; Bidens consolidifolia Turcz.; Bidens crithmifolia Kunth; Bidens delphinifolia Kunth; Bidens glaberrima DC.; Bidens hirtella Kunth; Bidens humilis Kunth; Bidens mollis Poepp. & Endl.; Bidens pectinata Sch.Bip.; Bidens pedunculata Phil.; Bidens procumbens Kunth; Bidens serrata Pav. ex DC.

= Bidens triplinervia =

Species of flowering plant

Bidens triplinervia is a Latin American species of flowering plants in the sunflower family. It is native to Mesoamerica and South America, from Chihuahua State in northern Mexico to Jujuy Province in northern Argentina.
