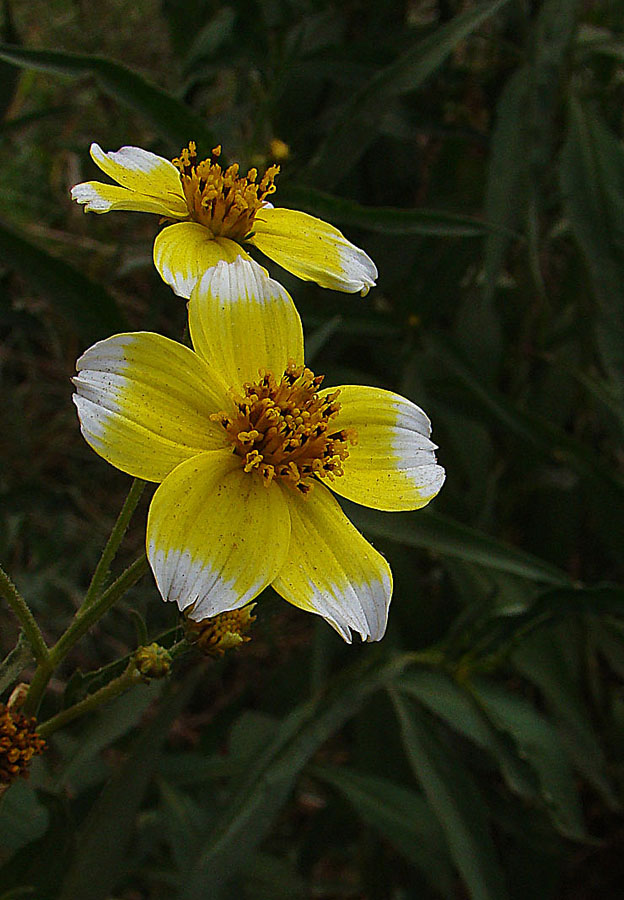
- from naturalized population in Chile

Conservation status
- Secure (NatureServe)

Scientific classification
- Kingdom: Plantae
- Clade: Tracheophytes
- Clade: Angiosperms
- Clade: Eudicots
- Clade: Asterids
- Order: Asterales
- Family: Asteraceae
- Genus: Bidens
- Species: B. aurea

Binomial name
- Bidens aurea (Aiton) Sherff

Synonyms
- Synonymy: Bidens arguta Kunth; Bidens decolorata Kunth; Bidens heterophylla Ortega; Bidens longifolia DC.; Bidens luxurians Willd.; Bidens tetragona (Cerv.) DC.; Bidens warszewicziana Regel; Coreopsis aurea Dryand. ex Aiton; Coreopsis coronata Walter 1788 not L. 1763; Coreopsis ferulifolia Jacq.; Coreopsis lucida Cav.; Coreopsis luxurians (Willd.) P. Pell.; Coreopsis nitida Cav.; Coreopsis nitida Hort.; Coreopsis tetragona Cerv. ex La Llave & Lex.; Diodonta aurea (Dryand. ex Aiton) Nutt.; Diodonta leptophylla Nutt.

= Bidens aurea =

North American species of flowering plant

Bidens aurea , the Arizona beggarticks, is a North American species of flowering plant in the family Asteraceae. It is widespread across much of Mexico and found also in Arizona and Guatemala. The species is also naturalized in parts of Europe and South America.

== Description ==
Bidens aurea is an annual herb occasionally reaching a height of 250 cm (100 inches). It produces numerous yellow or whitish flower heads containing both disc florets and ray florets. It grows primarily in wet areas such as marshes and streambanks.
