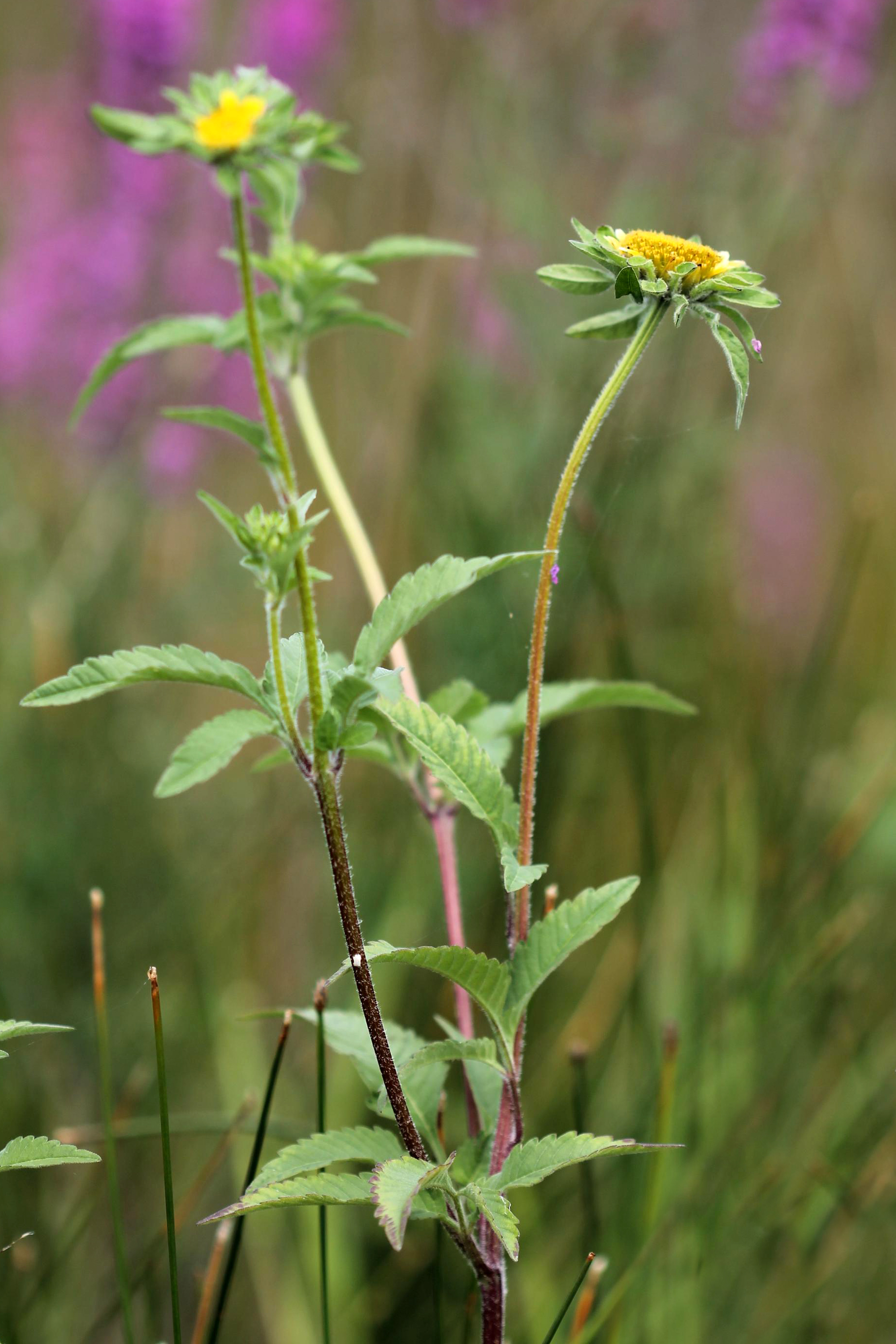

Conservation status
- Secure (NatureServe)

Scientific classification
- Kingdom: Plantae
- Clade: Tracheophytes
- Clade: Angiosperms
- Clade: Eudicots
- Clade: Asterids
- Order: Asterales
- Family: Asteraceae
- Genus: Bidens
- Species: B. vulgata

Binomial name
- Bidens vulgata Greene

Synonyms
- Bidens vulgatus Greene; Bidens puberula Wiegand

= Bidens vulgata =

Species of flowering plant

Bidens vulgata is a species of flowering plant in the family Asteraceae known by the common names big devils beggarticks and tall beggarticks. It is native to eastern and central North America from Nova Scotia to northern Georgia and as far west as the Rocky Mountains. It is an introduced species on the West Coast of North America as well as parts of Europe.

Bidens vulgata is an annual herb producing a hairy stem which generally grows 30 to 50 centimeters (12 to 20 inches) tall but often grows much taller, exceeding 100 cm (39 in). The leaves are made up of several lance-shaped leaflets each up to 8 centimeters long. The inflorescence produces several small flower heads with centers of yellow disc florets and a fringe of 3 to 5 yellow ray florets a few millimeters in length. Some heads lack ray florets. The fruit is a flattened achene with two sharp barbs at one end. The species grows primarily in wet locations such as swamps, marshes, streambanks, etc.
