= Bidens simplicifolia =

Conservation status
- Critically Endangered (IUCN 3.1)

Scientific classification
- Kingdom: Plantae
- Clade: Tracheophytes
- Clade: Angiosperms
- Clade: Eudicots
- Clade: Asterids
- Order: Asterales
- Family: Asteraceae
- Genus: Bidens
- Species: B. simplicifolia

Binomial name
- Bidens simplicifolia C.H.Wright

Species of flowering plant

Bidens simplicifolia is a species of flowering plant in the family Asteraceae. It is endemic to Ecuador. Its natural habitat is subtropical or tropical moist lowland forests. It is threatened by habitat loss.
