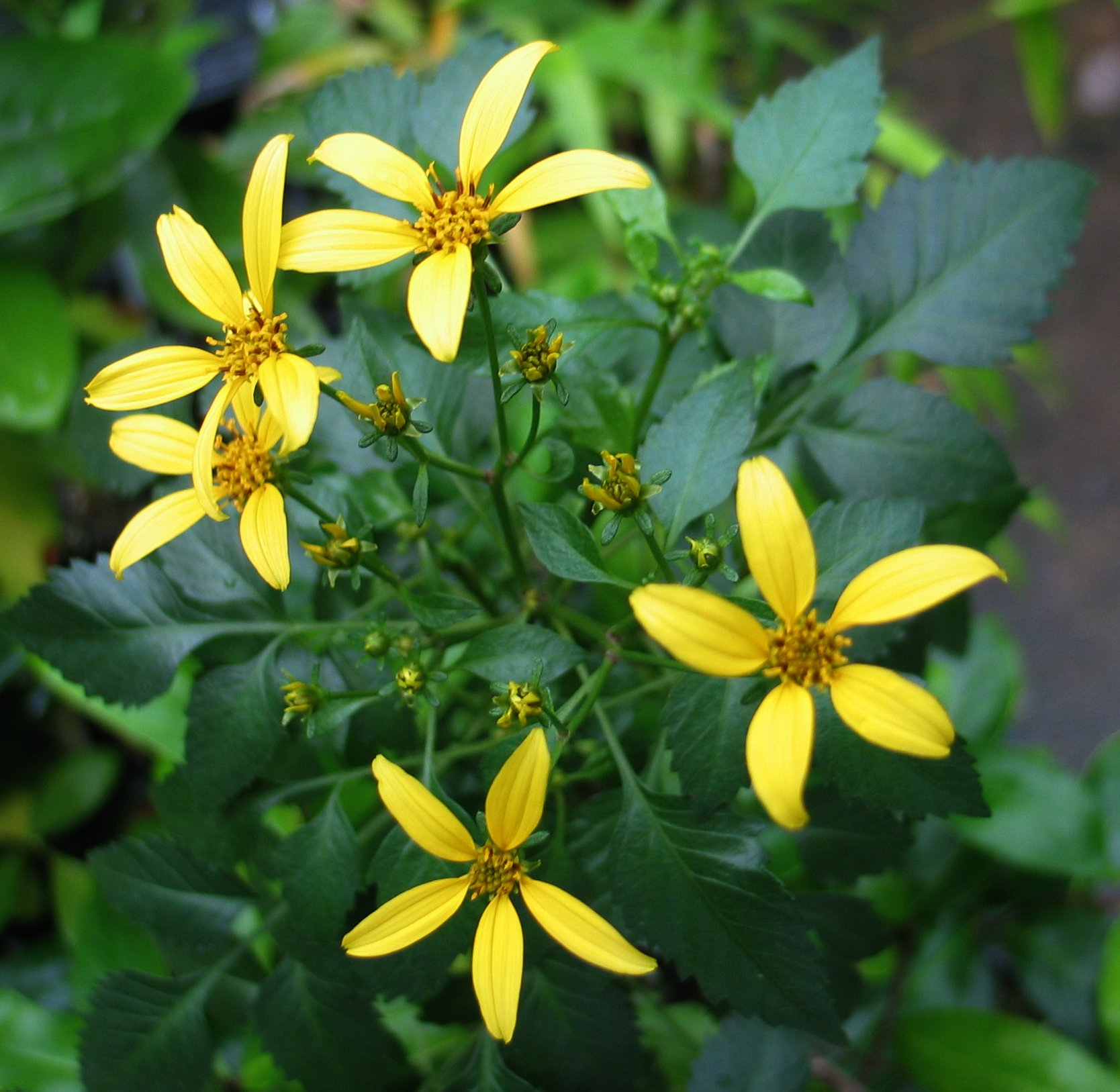

Conservation status
- Critically Endangered (IUCN 3.1)

Scientific classification
- Kingdom: Plantae
- Clade: Tracheophytes
- Clade: Angiosperms
- Clade: Eudicots
- Clade: Asterids
- Order: Asterales
- Family: Asteraceae
- Genus: Bidens
- Species: B. wiebkei

Binomial name
- Bidens wiebkei Sherff

Synonyms
- Bidens campylotheca var. nematocera Sherff; Bidens nematocera (Sherff) Sherff

= Bidens wiebkei =

Wiebke's beggarticks

Species of flowering plant

Bidens wiebkei, the Molokaʻi koʻokoʻolau or Wiebke's beggarticks, is a species of flowering plant in the family Asteraceae. It belongs to the genus Bidens, collectively called kokoʻolau or koʻokoʻolau in the Hawaiian language. It is found only on Molokaʻi in the Hawaiian Islands. There are three occurrences of the plant remaining, for a total population of fewer than 1000.

This is a perennial herb growing erect to a maximum height near one meter. It has compound leaves divided into leaflets and bears clusters of flower heads with yellow ray florets. Its natural habitat types include lowland moist forests and moist shrubland.

It is threatened by habitat loss due to the spread of invasive weeds, brush fires, overgrazing and human construction activity.
