= Bidens molokaiensis =

Molokaʻi beggarticks

Conservation status
- Vulnerable (IUCN 3.1)

Scientific classification
- Kingdom: Plantae
- Clade: Tracheophytes
- Clade: Angiosperms
- Clade: Eudicots
- Clade: Asterids
- Order: Asterales
- Family: Asteraceae
- Genus: Bidens
- Species: B. molokaiensis

Binomial name
- Bidens molokaiensis (Hillebr.) Sherff

Synonyms
- Campylotheca molokaiensis Hillebr. 1888

Species of flowering plant

Bidens molokaiensis, the Molokaʻi beggarticks, is a species of flowering plant in the family Asteraceae. It belongs to the genus Bidens, collectively called kokoʻolau or koʻokoʻolau in the Hawaiian language. It is found only on Molokaʻi in the Hawaiian Islands.

It inhabits low shrublands and rocky shores. It is threatened by habitat loss due to the spread of invasive weeds, overgrazing, and brushfires.
