= Bidens heterodoxa =

Scientific classification
- Kingdom: Plantae
- Clade: Tracheophytes
- Clade: Angiosperms
- Clade: Eudicots
- Clade: Asterids
- Order: Asterales
- Family: Asteraceae
- Genus: Bidens
- Species: B. heterodoxa

Binomial name
- Bidens heterodoxa Fernald

Synonyms
- Bidens heterodoxa var. agnostica Fernald; Bidens heterodoxa var. atheistica Fernald; Bidens heterodoxa var. monardifolia Fernald; Bidens heterodoxa var. orthodoxa Fernald & H.St.John; Bidens infirma Fernald; Bidens tripartita var. heterodoxa Fernald; Bidens tripartita f. infirma (Fernald) B.Boivin

Species of aquatic plant

Bidens heterodoxa, the Connecticut beggarticks, is a North American species of flowering plant in the family Asteraceae. It is native to eastern Canada (Québec, New Brunswick, Prince Edward Island) and the northeastern United States (Connecticut).

Bidens heterodoxa is an annual herb up to 50 cm (20 inches) tall. It produces as many as 3 flower heads containing yellow disc florets but usually no ray florets (occasionally 1, 2, or 3). The species grows mostly along the banks of estuaries and coastal salt marshes.
