= Bidens mannii =

Conservation status
- Vulnerable (IUCN 3.1)

Scientific classification
- Kingdom: Plantae
- Clade: Tracheophytes
- Clade: Angiosperms
- Clade: Eudicots
- Clade: Asterids
- Order: Asterales
- Family: Asteraceae
- Genus: Bidens
- Species: B. mannii

Binomial name
- Bidens mannii T.G.J.Rayner

Synonyms
- Verbesina monticola Hook.f. 1864 not Bidens monticola Poepp. & Endl. 1845; Coreopsis monticola (Hook.f.) Oliv. & Hiern; Coreopsis monticola var. pilosa Hutch. & Dalziel

Species of flowering plant

Bidens mannii is a species of flowering plant in the family Asteraceae. It is endemic to Cameroon. Its natural habitat is subtropical or tropical high-altitude grassland. It is threatened by habitat loss.
