= Bidens lemmonii =

Conservation status
- Apparently Secure (NatureServe)

Scientific classification
- Kingdom: Plantae
- Clade: Tracheophytes
- Clade: Angiosperms
- Clade: Eudicots
- Clade: Asterids
- Order: Asterales
- Family: Asteraceae
- Genus: Bidens
- Species: B. lemmonii

Binomial name
- Bidens lemmonii A.Gray

Species of flowering plant

Bidens lemmonii (Lemmon's beggarticks) is a North American species of flowering plant in the family Asteraceae. It is native to the southwestern United States (Arizona, New Mexico) and Mexico (Sonora, Chihuahua, Durango, Sinaloa, Michoacán, Baja California, Baja California Sur).

Bidens lemmonii is an annual herb up to 30 cm (12 inches) tall. It produces flower heads sometimes one at a time, sometimes in a group of several, each containing yellow disc florets and (usually) white ray florets. The species grows in wet seeps on rocky mountainsides.

The species is named for John Gill Lemmon (1831 or 32-1908), husband of American botanist Sara Plummer Lemmon (1836–1923).
