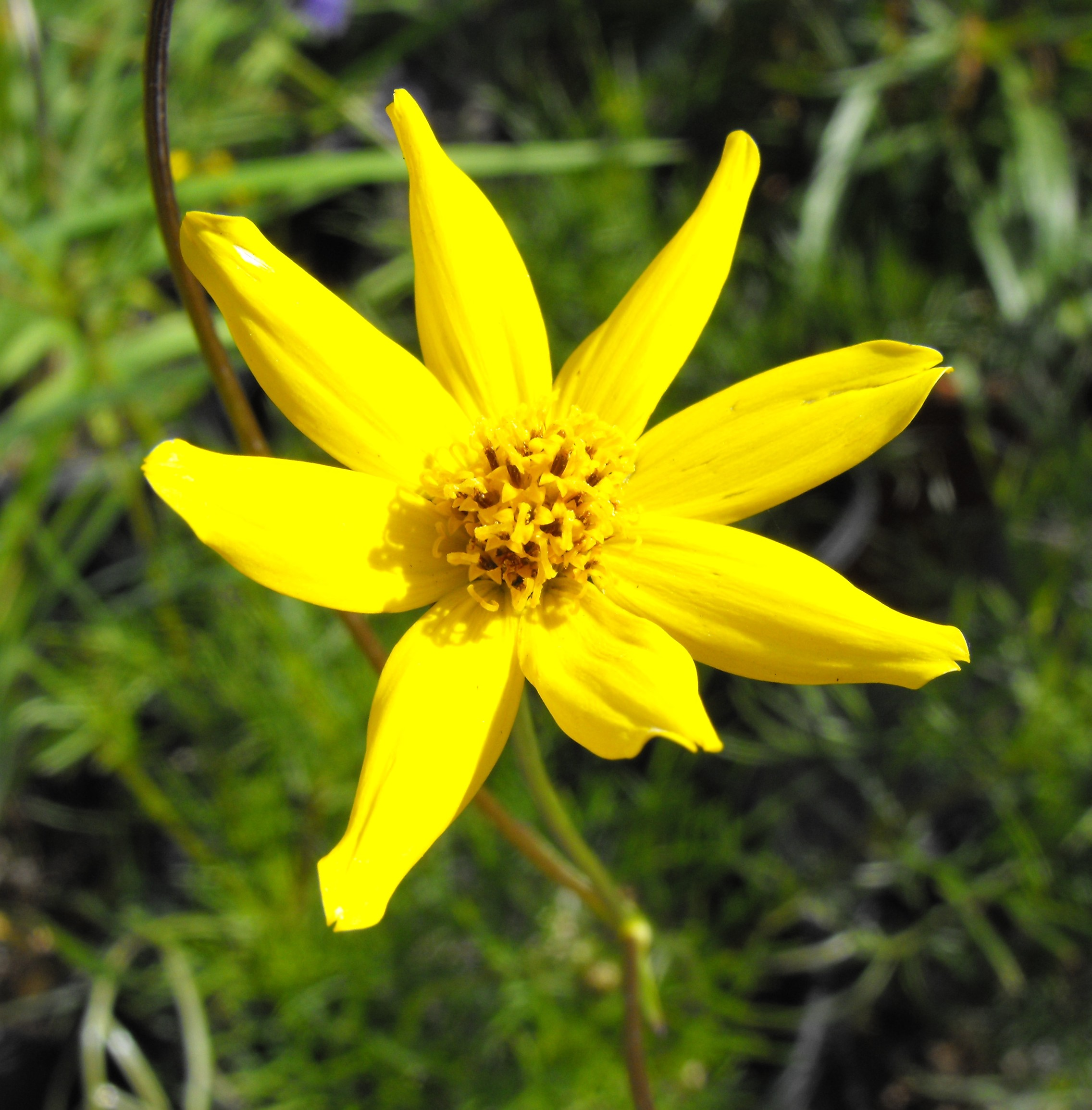

Scientific classification
- Kingdom: Plantae
- Clade: Tracheophytes
- Clade: Angiosperms
- Clade: Eudicots
- Clade: Asterids
- Order: Asterales
- Family: Asteraceae
- Genus: Bidens
- Species: B. nudata

Binomial name
- Bidens nudata Brandegee

= Bidens nudata =

Species of perennial plant

Bidens nudata is a species of perennial plant in the family Asteraceae commonly known as the Cape beggar's tick or Baja tickseed. This species is endemic to the Sierra de la Laguna and the Sierra de las Cacachilas of Baja California Sur, Mexico. It is characterized by a mounding habit, pinnate green leaves and large yellow daisy-like flowers. This species has found uses in horticulture as an ornamental, providing a drought-tolerant and durable plant for the garden.

== Description ==
A fast-growing, mounding perennial up to 90 centimetres (35 in) tall covered in finely textured foliage. The leaves are oppositely-arranged, shaped imparipinnate, and evergreen. The sessile leaflets are narrow and long, with a smooth margin. The inflorescence is a corymb, topped with brilliant greenish-yellow daisy-like flowers. After the flowers have bloomed, they produce achenes. This species was described by Townshend Stith Brandegee in 1890.

=== Distribution ===
This species is endemic to the state of Baja California Sur in Mexico. It is only found in the Cape region mountains of the Sierra de la Laguna and the Sierra de Las Cacachilas. It is found growing in grasslands, meadows, and forest edges.

== Uses ==
Available from nurseries specializing in xerophytic or Baja California plants, this species is an adaptable, durable, and drought-tolerant plant. It grows readily on a number of soils, including sand, clay, and rocky substrates. It grows in dry conditions but is tolerant of extra water, and thrives in both half-shady to full sun locations. It typically blooms in the month of November, providing flowers in a period when typically summer bloomers have gone to seed and winter bloomers have yet to open.
