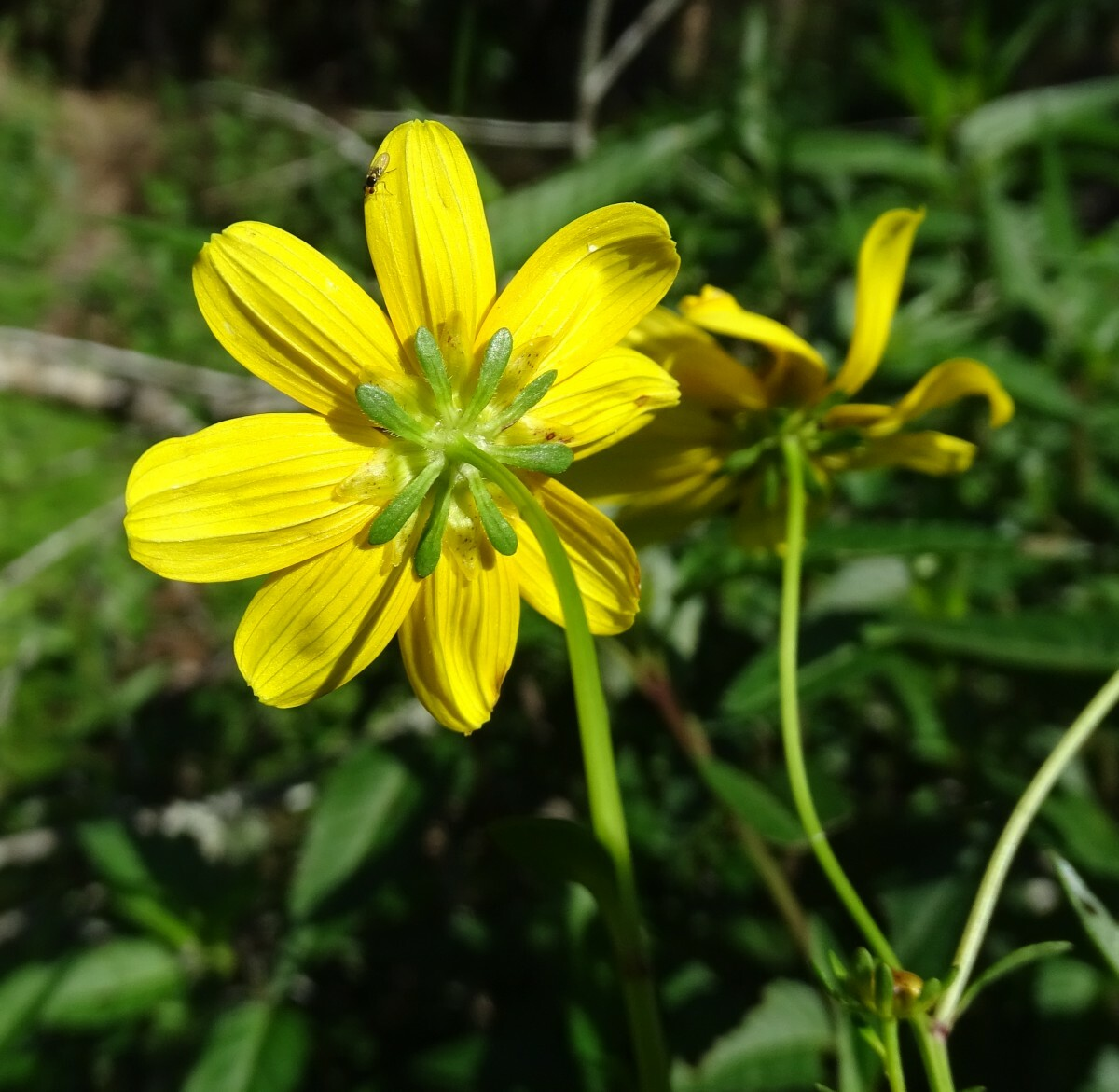

Scientific classification
- Kingdom: Plantae
- Clade: Tracheophytes
- Clade: Angiosperms
- Clade: Eudicots
- Clade: Asterids
- Order: Asterales
- Family: Asteraceae
- Genus: Bidens
- Species: B. mitis

Binomial name
- Bidens mitis (Michx.) Sherff

Synonyms
- Synonymy: Bidens aurea var. incisa Torr. & A.Gray; Bidens aurea var. leptophylla Torr. & A.Gray; Bidens aurea var. leptophylla (Nutt.) Sherff; Bidens aurea var. subintegra Torr. & A.Gray; Bidens mitis var. leptophylla (Nutt.) Small; Coreopsis ambigua Nutt.; Coreopsis arguta Pursh; Coreopsis cuspidata Bertol.; Coreopsis heterophylla Bertol.; Coreopsis jasminifolia Bertol.; Coreopsis mitis Michx.; Diodonta mitis (Michx.) Nutt.

= Bidens mitis =

Species of flowering plant

Bidens mitis, the smallfruit beggarticks, is a North American species of flowering plant in the family Asteraceae. It is native to the eastern, southeastern, and south-central parts of the United States, from eastern Texas to southern New Jersey.

Bidens mitis is an annual or sometimes perennial herb up to 100 cm (40 inches) tall. It produces numerous yellow flower heads containing both disc florets and ray florets. The species grows in marshes and on the borders of estuaries.
