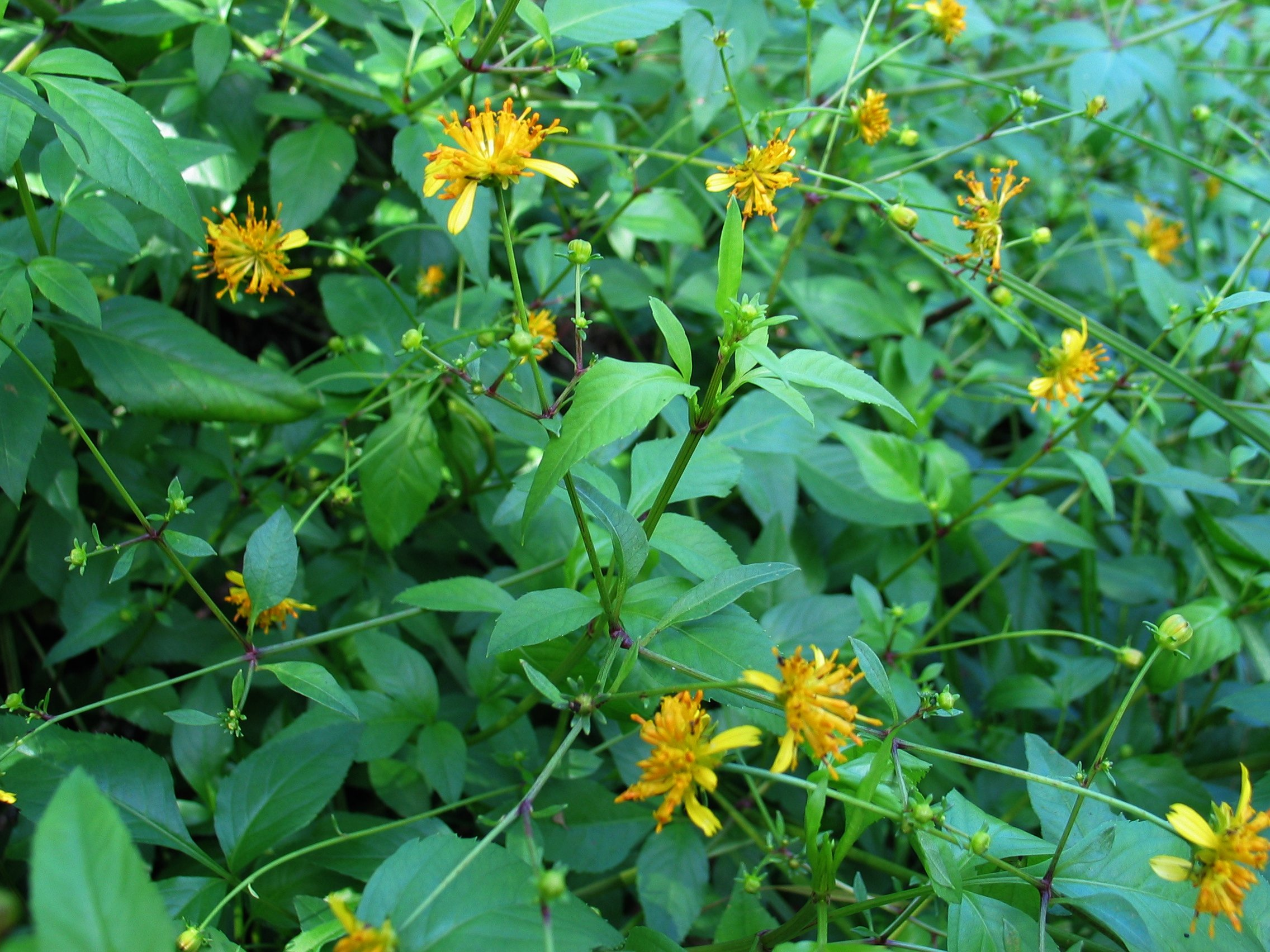

Conservation status
- Vulnerable (IUCN 3.1)

Scientific classification
- Kingdom: Plantae
- Clade: Tracheophytes
- Clade: Angiosperms
- Clade: Eudicots
- Clade: Asterids
- Order: Asterales
- Family: Asteraceae
- Genus: Bidens
- Species: B. campylotheca

Binomial name
- Bidens campylotheca Schultz-Bip.

Synonyms
- Bidens magnidisca O.Deg. & Sherff; Campylotheca grandiflora DC.; Coreopsis macraei A.Gray; Bidens glaucescens Greene, Synonym of subsp. pentamera; Bidens pentamera (Sherff) O.Deg. & Sherff, Synonym of subsp. pentamera

= Bidens campylotheca =

Viper beggarticks

Species of flowering plant

Bidens campylotheca, the viper beggarticks, is a species of flowering plant in the family Asteraceae. It belongs to the genus Bidens, collectively called kokoʻolau or koʻokoʻolau in the Hawaiian language. It is found only in the Hawaiian Islands.

Its natural habitat is lowland moist forests. It is threatened by habitat loss due to the spread of invasive weeds and brushfires.

Subspecies

- Bidens campylotheca subsp. campylotheca
- Bidens campylotheca subsp. pentamera (Sherff) Ganders & Nagata
