= Bidens heterosperma =

Conservation status
- Secure (NatureServe)

Scientific classification
- Kingdom: Plantae
- Clade: Tracheophytes
- Clade: Angiosperms
- Clade: Eudicots
- Clade: Asterids
- Order: Asterales
- Family: Asteraceae
- Genus: Bidens
- Species: B. heterosperma

Binomial name
- Bidens heterosperma A.Gray

Species of flowering plant

Bidens heterosperma, commonly known as the Rocky Mountain beggarticks, is an annual or perennial, herbaceous, flowering plant in the family Asteraceae, tribe Coreopsideae. It is native to northwestern and north-central Mexico, and portions of the southwestern United States.

== Description ==
Bidens heterosperma is an annual or perennial, herbaceous, flowering plant that grows between 5 and 60 cm (2.0 and 23.6 in) tall. The leaves are opposite, and are attached to petioles that are between 0.3 and 2 cm long; The leaf blades are once or twice pinnately divided, the terminal lobe is linear or filiform and is between 0.2 and 2.5 cm long by 0.5 to 2 cm wide; the leaves sometimes have small, hair-like protrusions on the margins; It usually produces flower heads one at a time on peduncles 1–10 cm long in groups of 5–6. The involucres are cylindric. There are 5–6 lanceolate to lance-elliptic phyllaries. There are 0–3 ray florets with yellow petals, and 5–13 disk florets with yellow corollas.

The plant flowers from September to October.

== Distribution and habitat ==
Bidens heterosperma is native to Mexico (the states of Baja California, Chihuahua, Sinaloa, and Sonora) and portions of the Southwestern United States (the states of Arizona, Colorado, and New Mexico).

=== Habitat ===
The plant typically grows on seeps on rocky slopes at elevations of 1,500 to 2,800 m (4,900 to 9,200 ft) from sea level.

== Conservation ==
As of December 2024, the conversation organization NatureServe listed Bidens heterosperma as Secure (G5) worldwide. Individual states have not been ranked. This status was last reviewed on 2 June 1993.

== Taxonomy ==
Bidens heterosperma was first named by Asa Gray in 1853 in the Smithsonian Contributions to Knowledge, volume 5 journal. The species has no listed synonyms in Plants of the World Online, World Flora Online, and Tropicos databases.

=== Etymology ===
According to SEINet, the species epithet heterosperma means "different seed". In English, the species is commonly called the Rocky Mountain Beggerticks.
