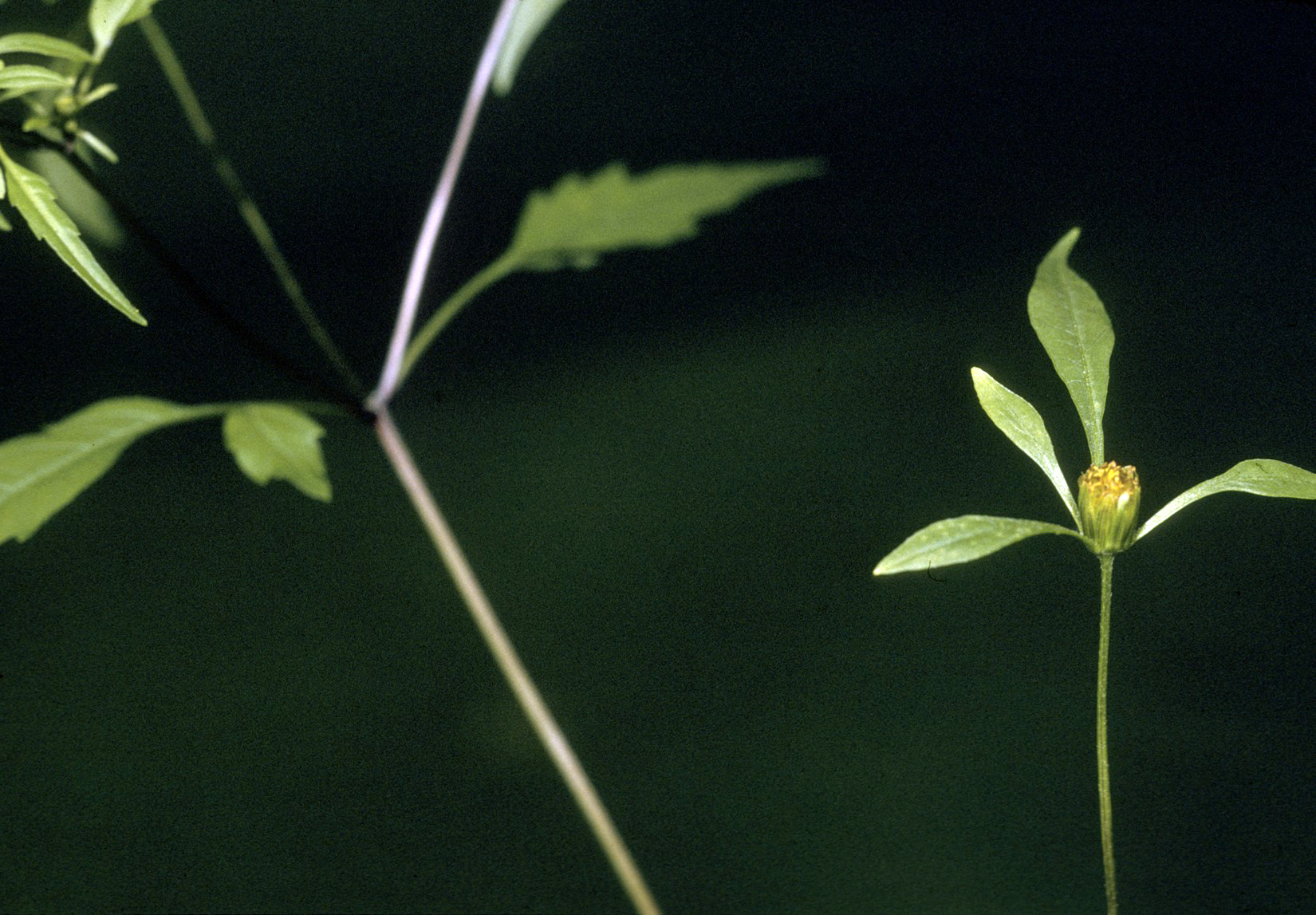

Conservation status
- Secure (NatureServe)

Scientific classification
- Kingdom: Plantae
- Clade: Tracheophytes
- Clade: Angiosperms
- Clade: Eudicots
- Clade: Asterids
- Order: Asterales
- Family: Asteraceae
- Genus: Bidens
- Species: B. discoidea

Binomial name
- Bidens discoidea (Torr. & A.Gray) Britton

Synonyms
- Bidens tenuissima Greene; Coreopsis discoidea Torr. & A.Gray

= Bidens discoidea =

Species of flowering plant

Bidens discoidea, commonly known as small beggarticks, is an annual, herbaceous, flowering plant in the Asteraceae family. It is widespread across eastern Canada and the eastern and central United States, from Nova Scotia west to Minnesota, south to Florida and Texas.

== Description ==
Bidens discoidea is an annual, herbaceous, flowering plant that typically grows between 10 and 180 cm (3.9 and 70.9 in) tall. The leaves are opposite and compound, and usually have petioles. The leaf blades are lanceolate to ovate, and are between 30 and 100 mm long by 10 to 80 mm wide with the final leaf segment being 10 to 100 mm long by 5 to 40 mm wide. There is usually one to three flower heads per flowering stem. There are between 10 and 20 orange disk florets and no ray florets per flower head.

The species typically flowers from August to November.

== Distribution and habitat ==
=== Distribution ===
Bidens discoidea is native to the entirety of the Eastern United States to South Central United States region, and portions of Eastern Canada (Ontario, Quebec and all of the Maritime Provinces except for Prince Edward Island). According to Plants of the World Online, Bidens discoidea has been introduced into France.

=== Habitat ===
The species grows in swamps, ponds and other wet areas at elevations of 10 to 300 metres from sea level.

== Conservation ==
As of November 2024, the conservation group NatureServe listed Bidens discoidea as Secure (G5) worldwide. This status was last reviewed on 19 July 2016. In individual provinces and states, it is listed as No Status Rank (SNR) in Texas, Oklahoma, Arkansas, Louisiana, Mississippi, Alabama, Georgia, Florida, South Carolina, Tennessee, Missouri, Illinois, Ohio, Maine, Wisconsin, Michigan, Connecticut, and Rhode Island; Secure (S5) in Kentucky; Apparently Secure (S4) in Ontario, New York, Massachusetts, Virginia, North Carolina, Delaware, and New Jersey; Vulnerable (S3) in Quebec, Minnesota, Iowa, Indiana, New Hampshire, Vermont, Pennsylvania; Critically Imperiled (S1) in West Virginia and New Brunswick; and Possibly Extirpated in Nova Scotia.

== Taxonomy ==
Bidens discoidea was first named as Coreopsis discoidea by John Torrey and Asa Gray in the A Flora of North America (1842) publication. In 1893, Nathaniel Lord Britton moved the species to the genus Bidens, while keeping the species epithet the same.
