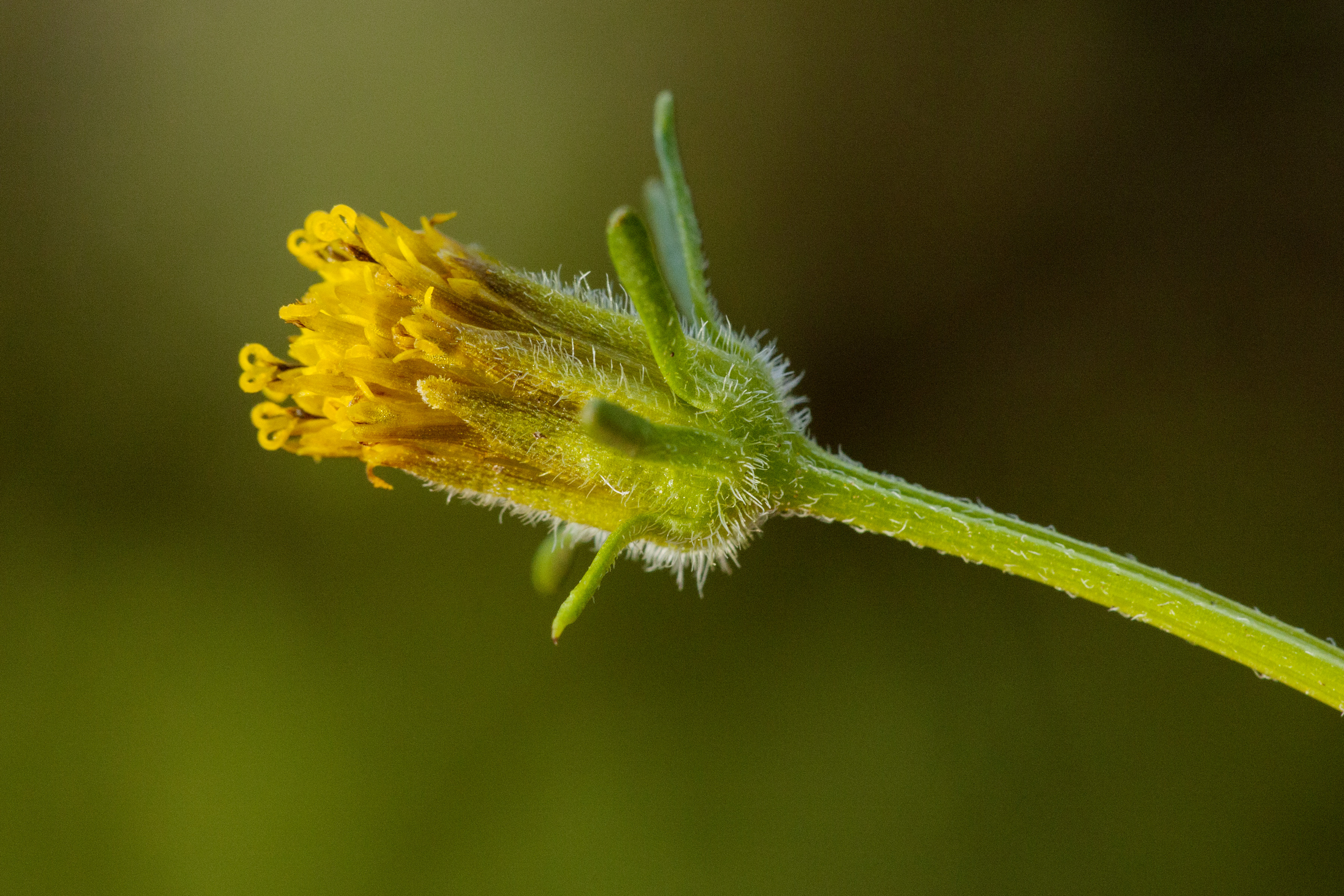

Conservation status
- Secure (NatureServe)

Scientific classification
- Kingdom: Plantae
- Clade: Tracheophytes
- Clade: Angiosperms
- Clade: Eudicots
- Clade: Asterids
- Order: Asterales
- Family: Asteraceae
- Genus: Bidens
- Species: B. tenuisecta

Binomial name
- Bidens tenuisecta A.Gray

Synonyms
- Bidens cognata Greene

= Bidens tenuisecta =

Species of flowering plant

Bidens tenuisecta , the slim lobe beggarticks, is a North American species of flowering plant in the family Asteraceae. It is native to northern Mexico (Chihuahua) and the western United States (Arizona, New Mexico, Colorado and Utah, with a few isolated populations in Texas and Idaho). There are also reports of populations in the northeastern United States (Massachusetts, New York, Maryland) but these are almost assuredly introductions.

Bidens tenuisecta is an annual herb up to 120 cm (4 feet) tall. It produces up to three yellow flower heads per branch, with each head containing both disc florets and ray florets. The plant grows in meadows and along mountain streams.
