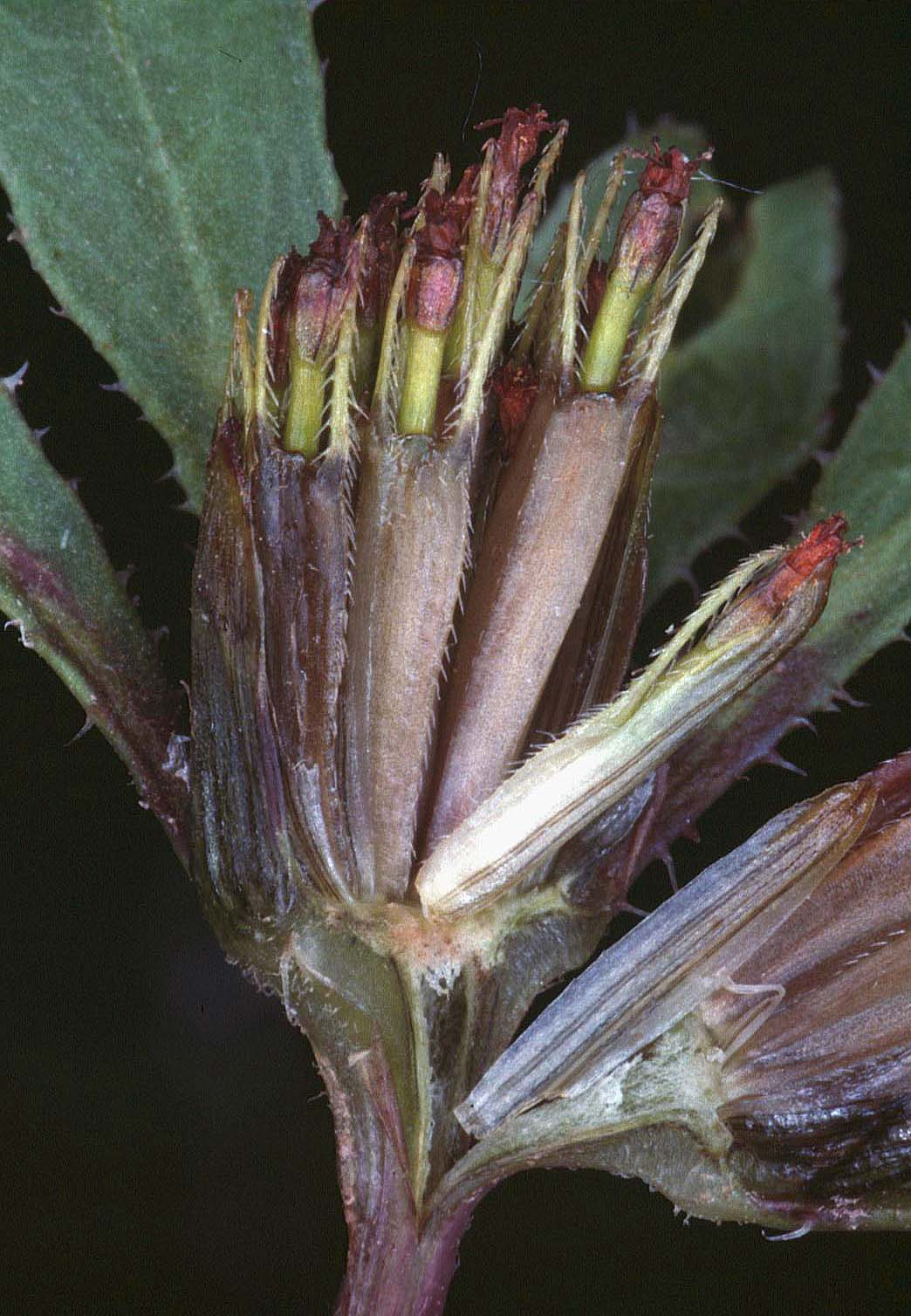

Scientific classification
- Kingdom: Plantae
- Clade: Tracheophytes
- Clade: Angiosperms
- Clade: Eudicots
- Clade: Asterids
- Order: Asterales
- Family: Asteraceae
- Genus: Bidens
- Species: B. connata

Binomial name
- Bidens connata Muhl. ex Willd.

Synonyms
- Bidens decipiens Warnst.; Bidens petiolata Nutt.; Bidens sandbergii Rydb.

= Bidens connata =

Species of flowering plant

Bidens connata , the purplestem beggarticks or London bur-marigold, is a species of flowering plant in the family Asteraceae. It is widespread across much of Eurasia, North Africa, and North America, and naturalized in Australia and on certain Pacific Islands.

Bidens connata is an annual herb up to 200 cm (80 inches) tall. It produces as many as 3 yellow flower heads containing both disc florets and ray florets. The species grows in marshes and other wet sites.
