= Blue lettuce =

Blue lettuce, wild blue lettuce, or common blue lettuce can refer to:

- Cicerbita alpina (synonym Lactuca alpina), tall blue lettuce or alpine sow-thistle, native to upland and mountainous parts of Europe
- Lactuca biennis, tall blue lettuce or blue wood lettuce, native to the eastern half of the United States and Canada
- Lactuca canadensis, Florida blue lettuce or Canada blue lettuce, considered to be a native to parts of North America and introduced elsewhere
- Lactuca perennis, blue lettuce, native to Central and Southern Europe
- Lactuca pulchella, blue lettuce, native to North America
- Lactuca tatarica, blue lettuce, native to Europe and Asia
