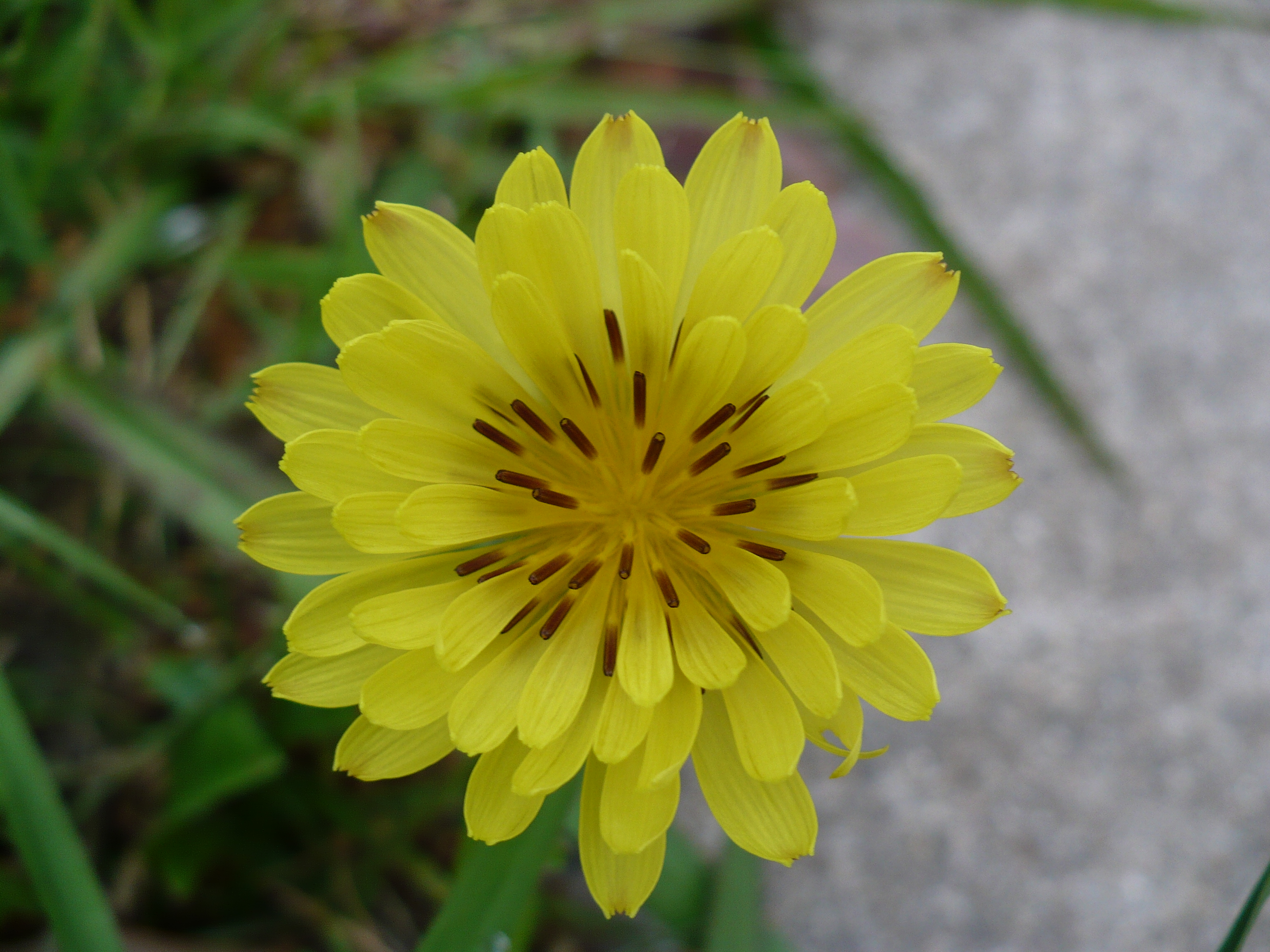
- Pyrrhopappus pauciflorus

Scientific classification
- Kingdom: Plantae
- Clade: Tracheophytes
- Clade: Angiosperms
- Clade: Eudicots
- Clade: Asterids
- Order: Asterales
- Family: Asteraceae
- Subfamily: Cichorioideae
- Tribe: Cichorieae
- Subtribe: Microseridinae
- Genus: Pyrrhopappus; DC.

Type species
- Pyrrhopappus carolinianus (Walter) DC.

Synonyms
- Crinissa Rchb.; Sitilias Raf.

= Pyrrhopappus =

Genus of plants

Pyrrhopappus is a genus of North American plants in the tribe Cichorieae within the family Asteraceae. Desert-chicory is a common name.

Species

- Pyrrhopappus carolinianus (Walter) DC. - southeastern + south-central United States
- Pyrrhopappus grandiflorus (Nutt.) Nutt. - Great Plains from Nebraska to Texas
- Pyrrhopappus pauciflorus (D.Don) DC. - southern United States from Arizona to Florida; Mexico (Coahuila, Nuevo León, Durango, Tamaulipas)
- Pyrrhopappus rothrockii A.Gray - Chihuahua, Coahuila, New Mexico, Durango, Nuevo León, Arizona, San Luis Potosí, Texas, Puebla
- Pyrrhopappus taraxacoides DC.

formerly included

see Lactuca

- Pyrrhopappus hochstetteri A.Rich. - Lactuca inermis Forssk.
- Pyrrhopappus humilis A.Rich. - Lactuca inermis Forssk.
