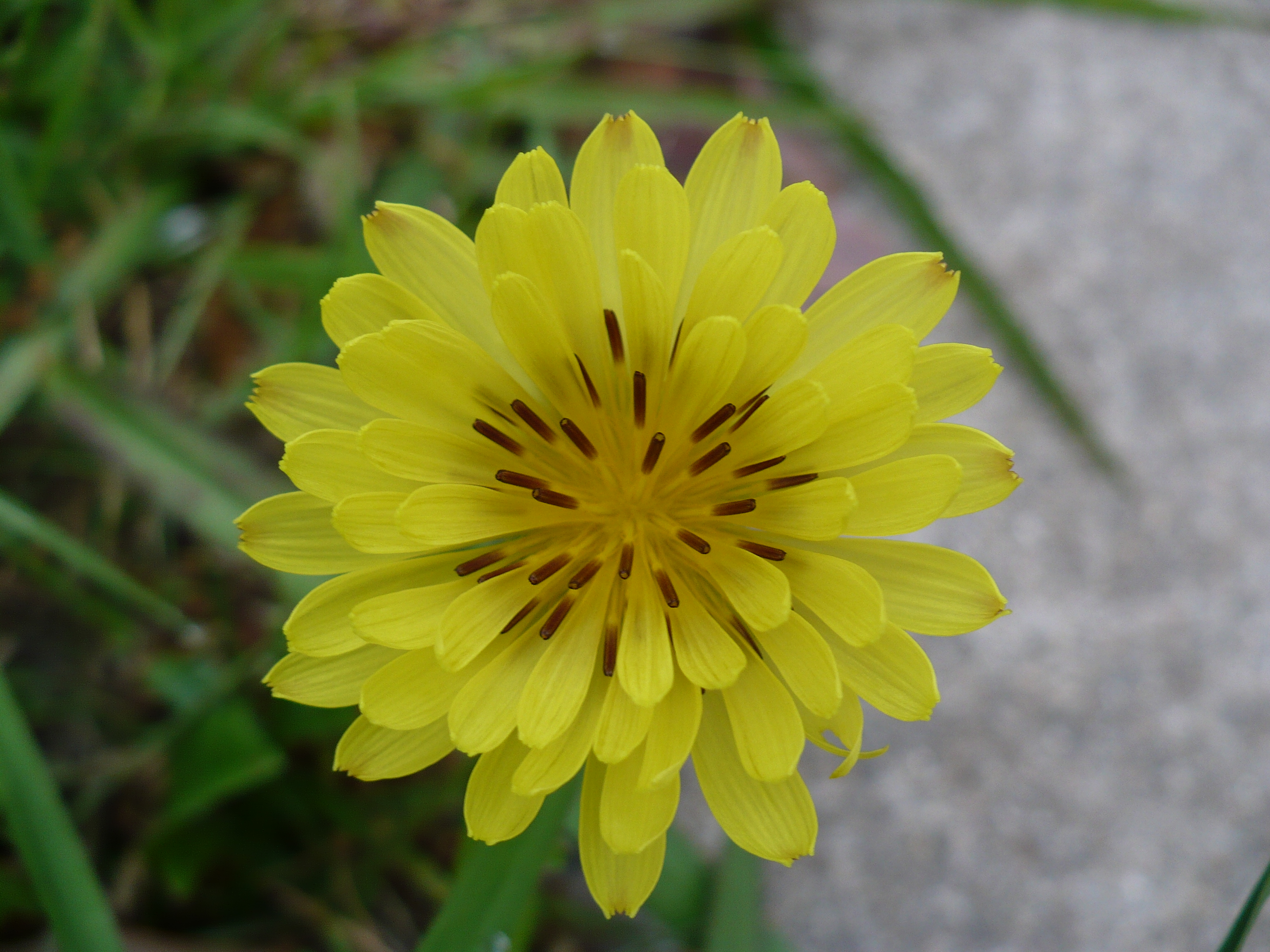

Scientific classification
- Kingdom: Plantae
- Clade: Tracheophytes
- Clade: Angiosperms
- Clade: Eudicots
- Clade: Asterids
- Order: Asterales
- Family: Asteraceae
- Genus: Pyrrhopappus
- Species: P. pauciflorus

Binomial name
- Pyrrhopappus pauciflorus (D.Don) DC.

Synonyms
- Chondrilla intybacea Ledeb.; Chondrilla pauciflora D.Don; Chondrilla sessaeana D.Don; Pyrrhopappus geiseri Shinners; Pyrrhopappus multicaulis DC.; Pyrrhopappus sessaeanus (D.Don) DC.; Sitilias multicaulis (DC.) Greene; Sitilias pauciflora (D.Don) Greene; Sitilias sessaeana (D.Don) Greene

= Pyrrhopappus pauciflorus =

Species of flowering plant

Pyrrhopappus pauciflorus, commonly known as smallflower desert-chicory, Texas false dandelion or Texas dandelion, is a species of flowering plant in the family Asteraceae. It is native to the southern United States and northern Mexico. It is a weedy annual found in prairies, clay soils and disturbed habitats such as fields and sidewalks.

== Description ==
The Texas dandelion is a taproot that grows 6 to 20 inches (15 to 50 centimeters) in height. Its petals open in the morning and stay open through midday, and the plant typically blooms from March to May. When broken, the stem produces a milky sap. Seeds dry out to resemble dandelion puffs.

According to the U.S. Geological Survey, "The upper leaves of Pyrrhopappus pauciflorus are pinnatifid with usually 2 or 3 linear lobes on each side and lower leaves that are usually pinnatifid, sometimes merely toothed late in the season. [It has] hairless, clasping, cauline leaves."

P. pauciflorus is similar in appearance to P. carolinianus but has trichomes on its stems, which the latter lacks.

== Etymology and history ==
The scientific name Pyrrhopappus pauciflorus has many roots, with "pyrrhos" meaning fiery or red-colored, "pappus" referring to the unique sepals of Asteraceae.

Scottish botanist David Don (1799–1841) first named the species, calling it Chondrilla pauciflora in his 1830 article "Descriptions of the new Genera and Species of the Class Compositœ belonging to the Floras of Peru, Mexico, and Chile."

The flower was described as Pyrrhopappus pauciflorus by Augustin Pyramus de Candolle (1778–1841) in volume 7 of his 17-volume series on plant classification, Prodromus systematis naturalis regni vegetabilis.

== Ecology ==
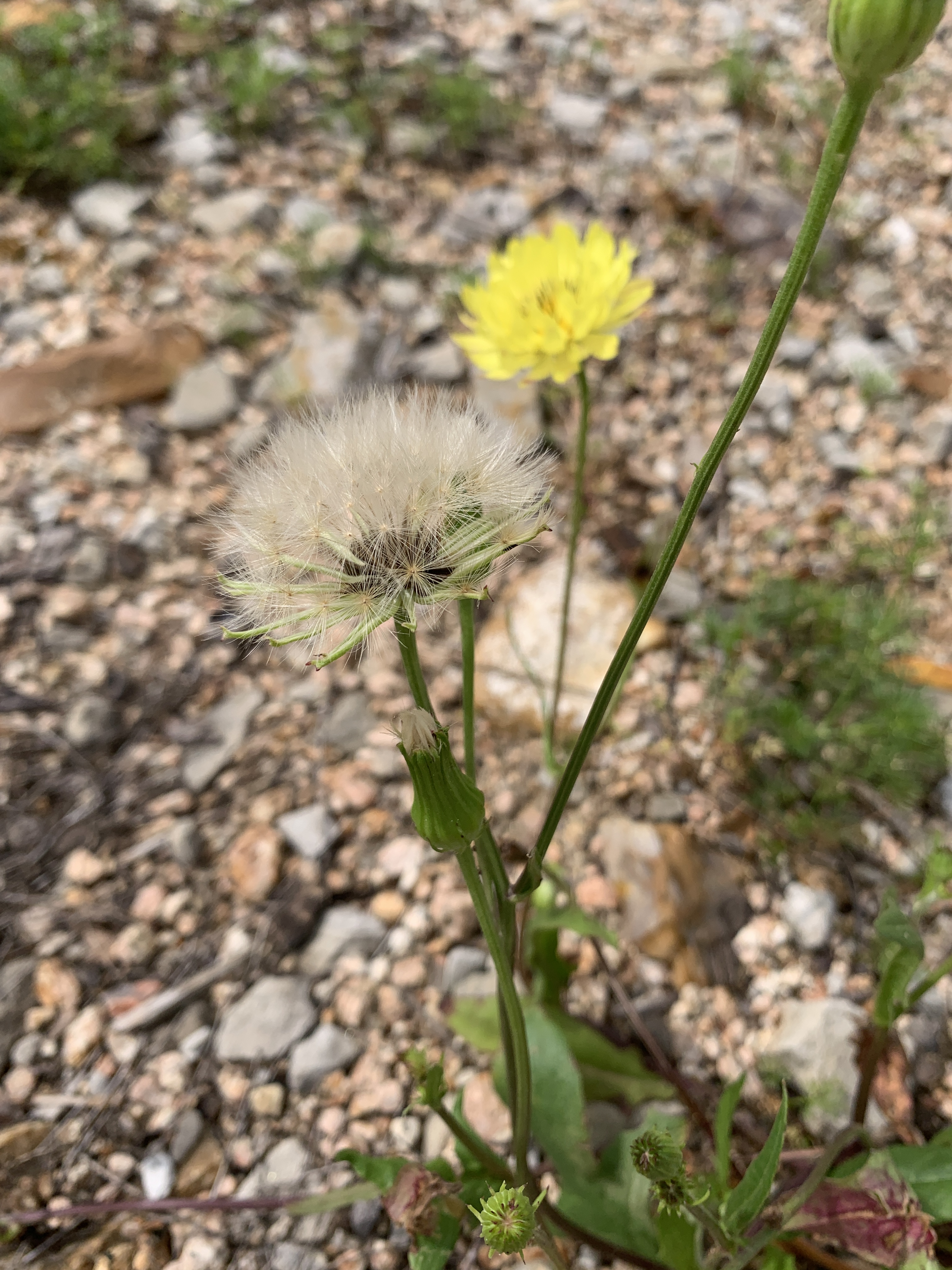
Pyrrhopappus pauciflorus in the seed-bearing stage in College Station, Texas.

Texas dandelion serves as a food source for several local species; cattle and white-tailed deer eat the leaves and stems, and Rio Grande turkeys eat the seeds. It attracts small pollinators, similar to related flowers.

== Cultivation and uses ==
As a freeze-hardy native wildflower, Texas dandelion can grow in full or partial sun and requires little water. It prefers well-drained soil, such as sand or clay. It can grow under tree canopies as well as in grasslands.

Roots can be used to brew dandelion tea or coffee. The leaves are edible but have a bitter taste, so they're often boiled before eating. It's also possible to make jelly out of Texas dandelion. According to physical organic chemist and forager Mark "Merriwether" Vorderbruggen, "The bitter flavor of the roots are becoming popular with high-end bartenders making their own concoctions where these roots replace traditional bitters."
