= Lactuca longifolia =

Lactuca longifolia can refer to:

- Lactuca longifolia DC., a synonym of Lactuca dolichophylla Kitam.
- Lactuca longifolia Michx., a synonym of Lactuca canadensis L.
- Lactuca sativa L. var. longifolia Lam., romaine lettuce
