= Lactuca tetrantha =

Conservation status
- Vulnerable (IUCN 3.1)

Scientific classification
- Kingdom: Plantae
- Clade: Tracheophytes
- Clade: Angiosperms
- Clade: Eudicots
- Clade: Asterids
- Order: Asterales
- Family: Asteraceae
- Genus: Lactuca
- Species: L. tetrantha

Binomial name
- Lactuca tetrantha B.L.Burtt & P.H.Davis

Synonyms
- Scariola tetrantha (B.L.Burtt & P.H.Davis) Soják

Species of lettuce

Lactuca tetrantha, the Troödos lettuce, is an erect, lactiferous, perennial herb, 10–30 cm high. Leaves hairless, deeply dissected, the basal in rosette, oblong, 3-12 x 0.8-2.5 cm, often purplish-green, the upper alternate, smaller. Flowers in capitula, arranged in corymbs, florets 4, ligulate, yellow, reddish at the lower surface, flowers July–October, fruit a pappose achene.

== Habitat ==
Rocky hillsides and rock crevices on serpentinised rocks at 1500–1900 m altitude.

== Distribution ==
Endemic to Cyprus where it is restricted to the higher parts of the Troödos Forest, mostly around Khionistra where it is not uncommon.
