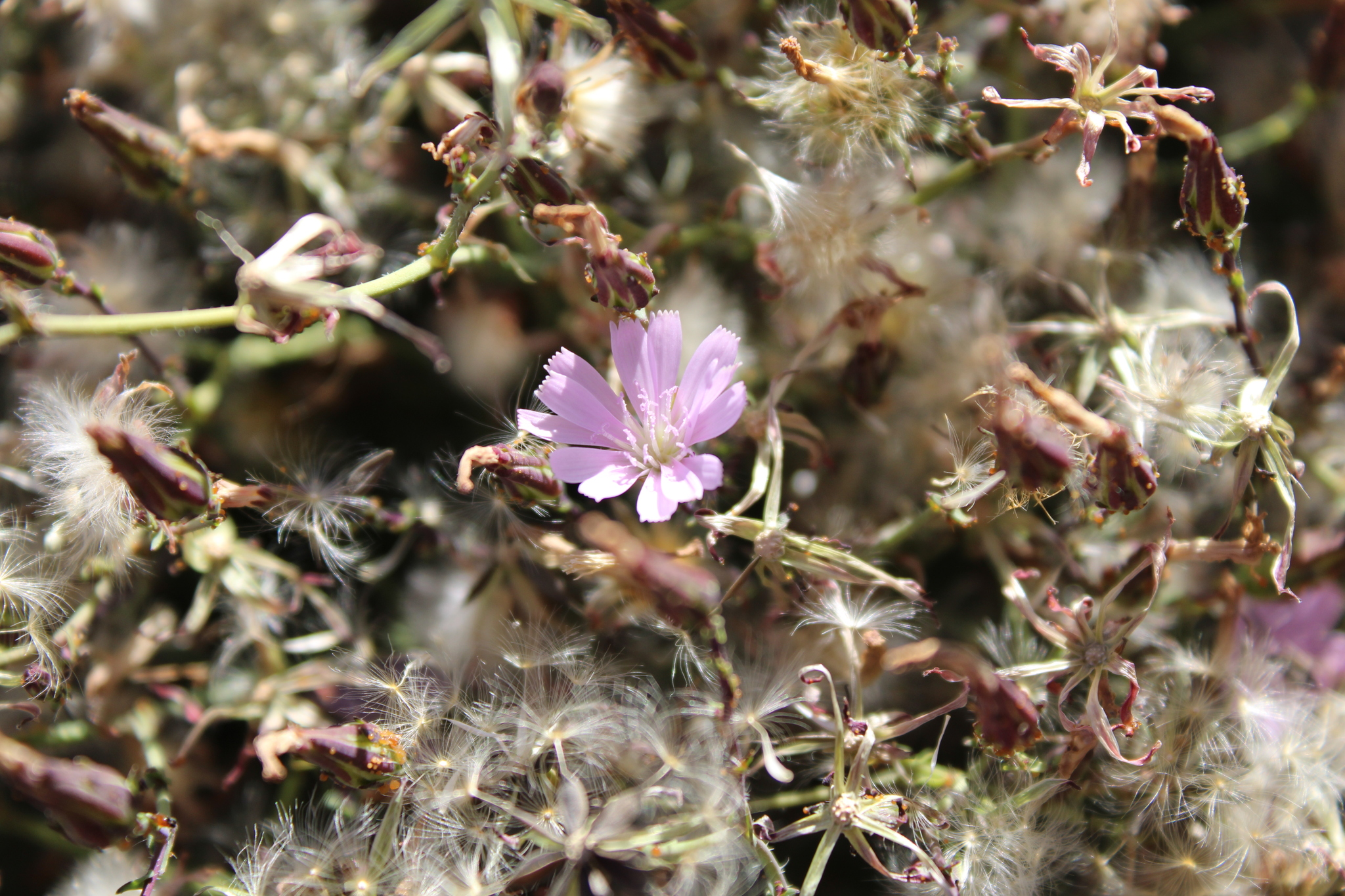

Scientific classification
- Kingdom: Plantae
- Clade: Tracheophytes
- Clade: Angiosperms
- Clade: Eudicots
- Clade: Asterids
- Order: Asterales
- Family: Asteraceae
- Genus: Lactuca
- Species: L. palmensis

Binomial name
- Lactuca palmensis Bolle

Synonyms
- Cicerbita palmensis Beauverd

= Lactuca palmensis =

Species of plant

Lactuca palmensis is a species of wild lettuce endemic to the Canary Islands. DNA evidence shows that it is closely related to the African and European species of Lactuca, while the Azores endemic Lactuca watsoniana is more closely related to the North American lineage.
