= Lactuca raddeana =

Scientific classification
- Kingdom: Plantae
- Clade: Tracheophytes
- Clade: Angiosperms
- Clade: Eudicots
- Clade: Asterids
- Order: Asterales
- Family: Asteraceae
- Genus: Lactuca
- Species: L. raddeana

Binomial name
- Lactuca raddeana Maxim.

Synonyms
- List: Lactuca alliariifolia H.Lév. & Vaniot; Lactuca elata Hemsl. ex F.B.Forbes & Hemsl.; Lactuca nakaiana H.Lév. & Vaniot; Lactuca vaniotii H.Lév.; Prenanthes hieraciifolia H.Lév.; Pterocypsela elata (Hemsl.) C.Shih; Pterocypsela raddeana (Maxim.) C.Shih

Species of plant

Lactuca raddeana is a species of wild lettuce native to Vietnam, eastern China, the Korean peninsula, the Russian Far East, Sakhalin, the Kuril Islands, and Japan. A biennial or perennial, growing to 2 m, it has a very wide range of variation in leaf shape, across a spectrum from undivided leaves to pinnatipartite leaves. It is edible but bitter.

== Varieties ==
A variety is currently accepted:

- Lactuca raddeana var. aogashimaensis (Kitam.) Katsuy.
