= Lactuca watsoniana =

Conservation status
- Endangered (IUCN 3.1)

Scientific classification
- Kingdom: Plantae
- Clade: Tracheophytes
- Clade: Angiosperms
- Clade: Eudicots
- Clade: Asterids
- Order: Asterales
- Family: Asteraceae
- Genus: Lactuca
- Species: L. watsoniana

Binomial name
- Lactuca watsoniana Trel.

Species of plant

Lactuca watsoniana, locally known as alfacinha, is a species of wild lettuce endemic to the Azores. An endangered species, there are fewer than 2000 individuals remaining in the wild. DNA evidence shows that it is closely related to the North American species of Lactuca, while the Canary Islands endemic Lactuca palmensis is more closely related to African and European Lactuca lineage.
