= Lactuca aculeata =

Scientific classification
- Kingdom: Plantae
- Clade: Embryophytes
- Clade: Tracheophytes
- Clade: Angiosperms
- Clade: Eudicots
- Clade: Asterids
- Order: Asterales
- Family: Asteraceae
- Genus: Lactuca
- Species: L. aculeata

Binomial name
- Lactuca aculeata Boiss.

Species of plant

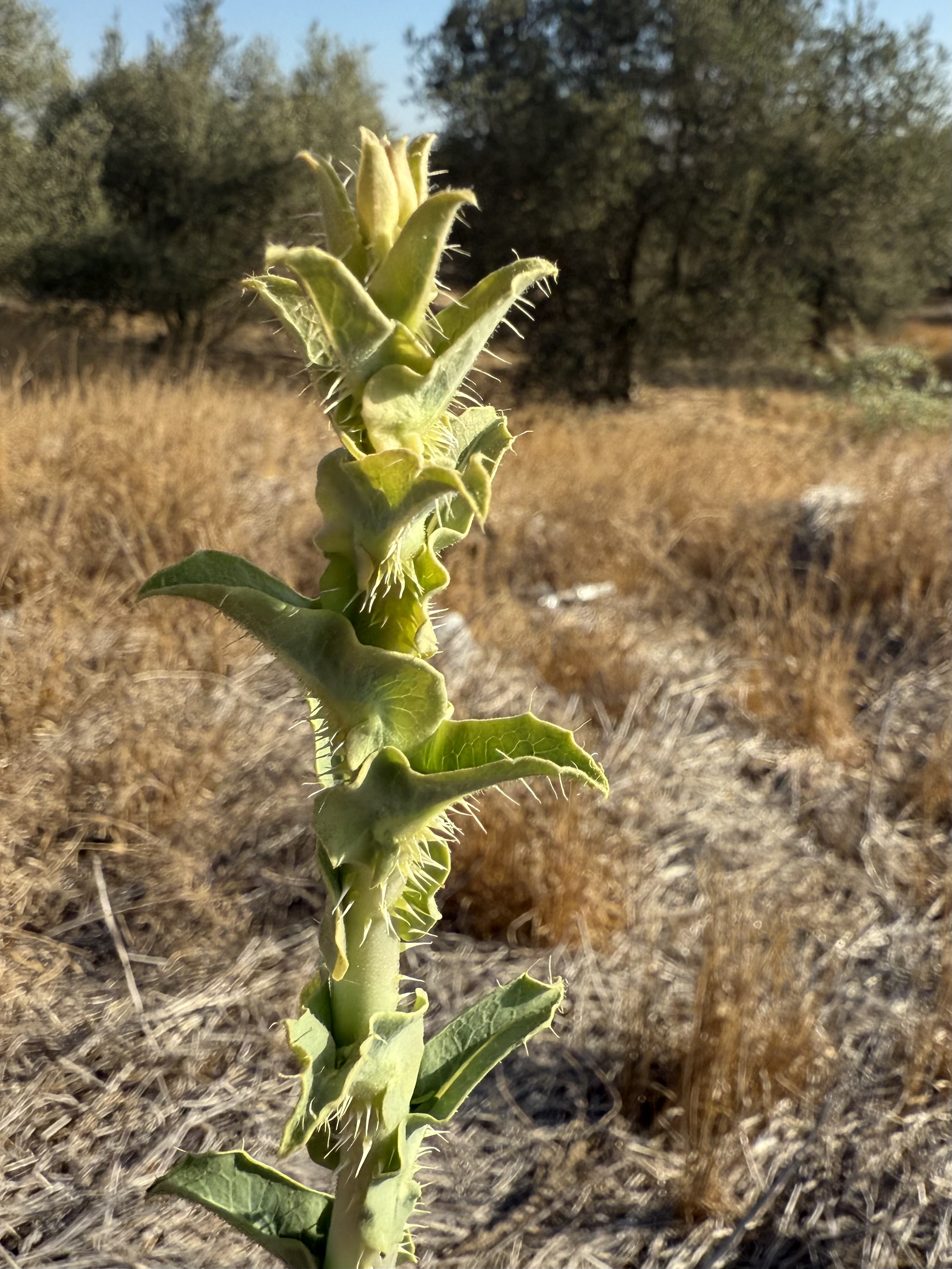
Lactuca aculeata in Golan Heights

Lactuca aculeata is a species of wild lettuce native to Anatolia, the Levant, Iraq and Iran. A very prickly plant, it is closely related to Lactuca serriola (prickly lettuce) and Lactuca sativa (cultivated or garden lettuce), and can readily interbreed with them. It is possible that Lactuca aculeata contributed to the gene pool of cultivated lettuce.
