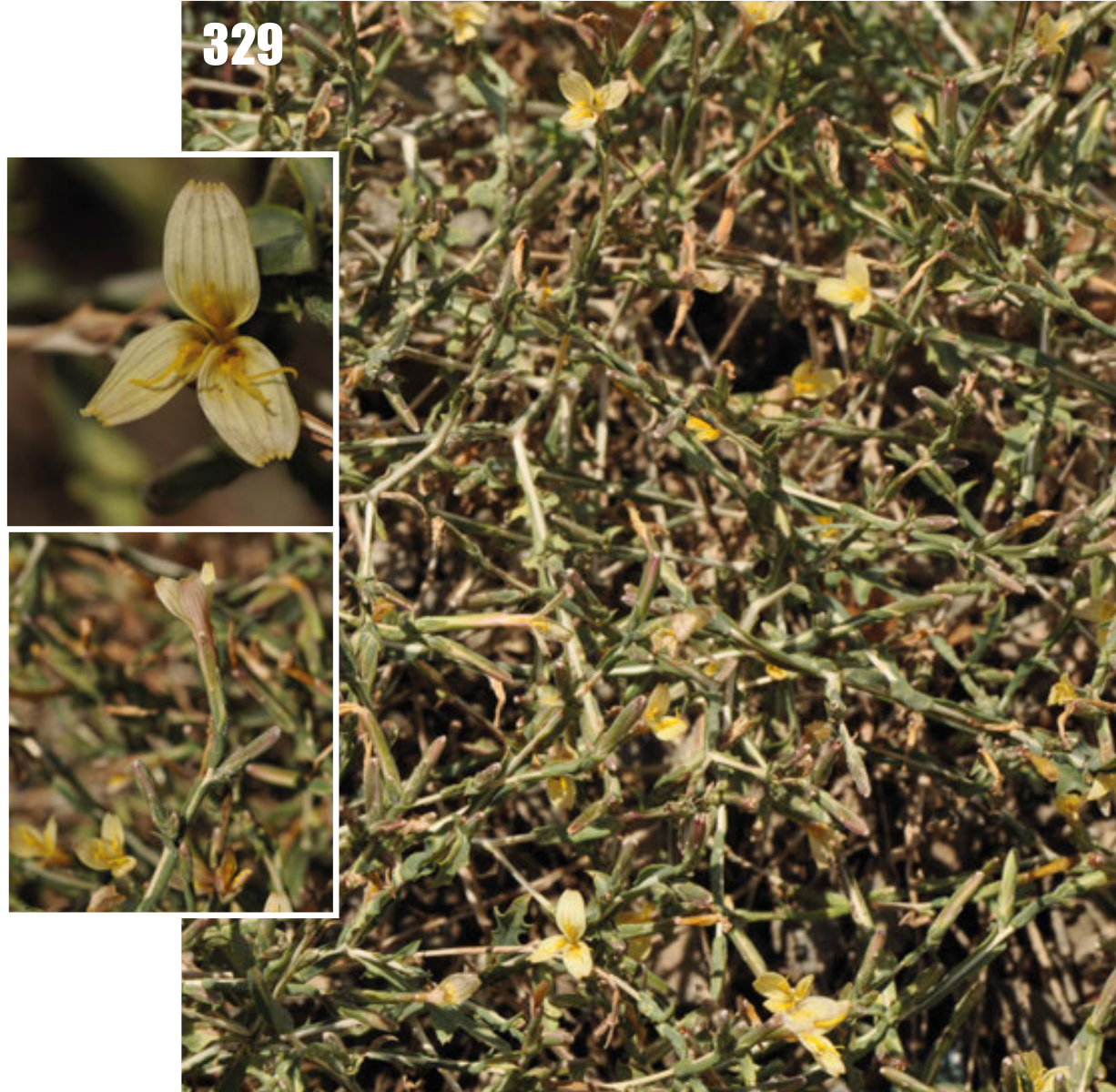

Scientific classification
- Kingdom: Plantae
- Clade: Embryophytes
- Clade: Tracheophytes
- Clade: Angiosperms
- Clade: Eudicots
- Clade: Asterids
- Order: Asterales
- Family: Asteraceae
- Genus: Lactuca
- Species: L. orientalis

Binomial name
- Lactuca orientalis (Boiss.) Boiss. 1875

Synonyms
- Phaenopus orientalis Boiss. 1841; Scariola orientalis(Boiss.) Soják 1962; Lactuca viminea var. erostris Regel

= Lactuca orientalis =

Species of plant

Lactuca orientalis is a Eurasian species of plant in the tribe Cichorieae within the family Asteraceae. It is widespread across the Middle East and southern Asia as far east as Tibet.

Lactuca orientalis is a branching subshrub up to 60 cm tall. Leaves are both on the stem and also clustered in a circle around the base. The plant produces one flower head per branch, each head with 4–5 yellow ray flowers but no disc flowers.
