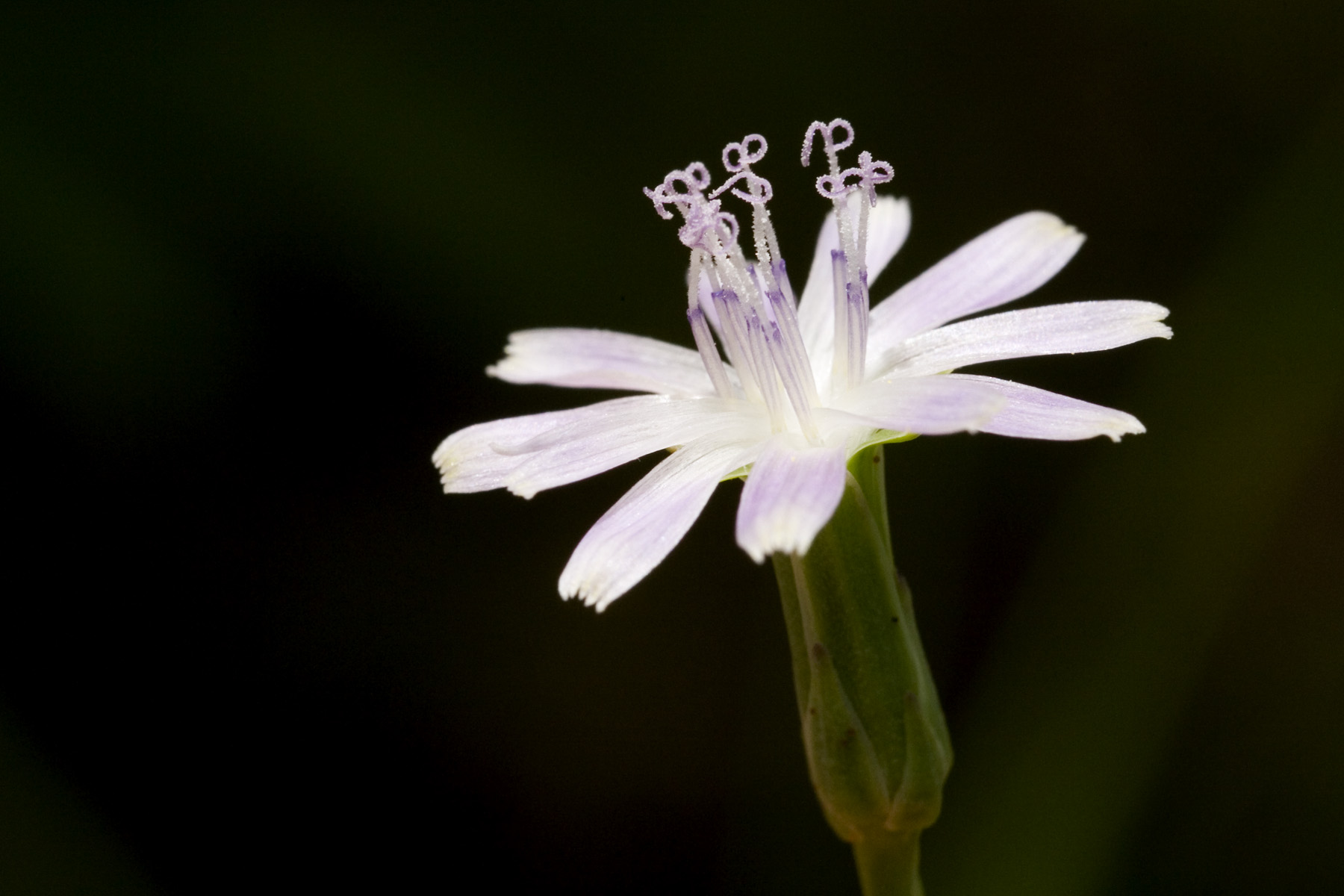

Conservation status
- Secure (NatureServe)

Scientific classification
- Kingdom: Plantae
- Clade: Tracheophytes
- Clade: Angiosperms
- Clade: Eudicots
- Clade: Asterids
- Order: Asterales
- Family: Asteraceae
- Genus: Lactuca
- Species: L. graminifolia

Binomial name
- Lactuca graminifolia Michx. 1803

Synonyms
- Galathenium graminifolium (Michx.) Nutt.; Lactuca graminifolia var. arizonica McVaugh; Wiestia graminifolia (Michx.) Sch.Bip.

= Lactuca graminifolia =

Species of lettuce

Lactuca graminifolia, the grassleaf lettuce is a North American species of wild lettuce. It grows in Mexico, Central America, Hispaniola, and the southern United States from Arizona to Florida, Virginia and the Carolinas.

== Description ==
Lactuca graminifolia is a biennial herb in the dandelion tribe within the daisy family growing from a taproot a height of up to 150 cm (5 feet). The top of the stem bears a multibranched inflorescence with many flower heads. Each head contains 15-20 blue or purple ray florets but no disc florets. The fruit is a brown achene.

== Distribution and habitat ==
L. graminifolia's range extends from North Carolina south to Florida, and westward to Louisiana.

This species has been observed in habitats such as pine flatwoods, longleaf pine-wiregrass pinelands, and fallow fields. It grows in dry,, loamy soils.
