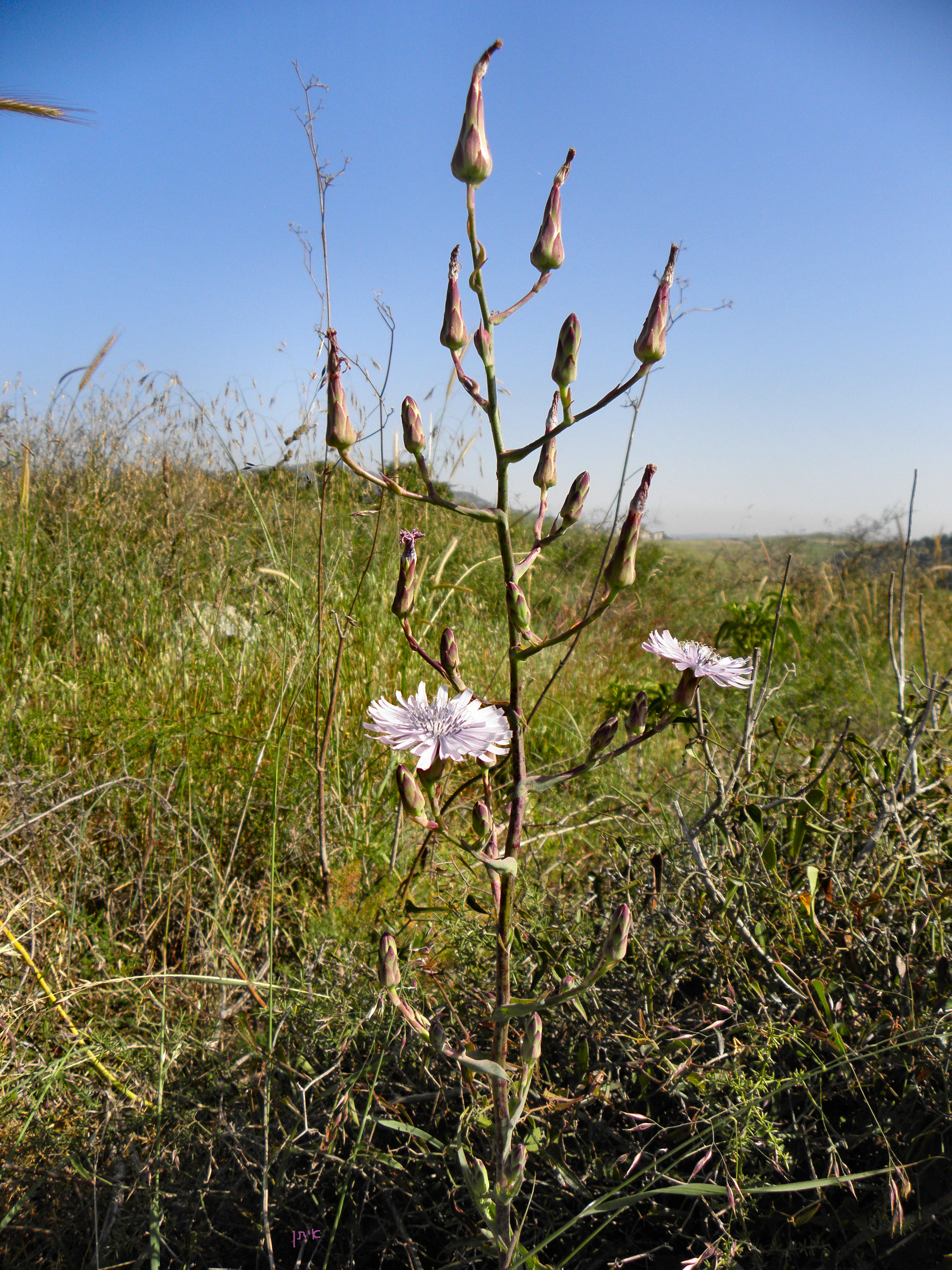

Scientific classification
- Kingdom: Plantae
- Clade: Tracheophytes
- Clade: Angiosperms
- Clade: Eudicots
- Clade: Asterids
- Order: Asterales
- Family: Asteraceae
- Genus: Lactuca
- Species: L. tuberosa

Binomial name
- Lactuca tuberosa Jacq.

Synonyms
- Steptorhamphus tuberosus (Jacq.) Grossh.

= Lactuca tuberosa =

Species of lettuce

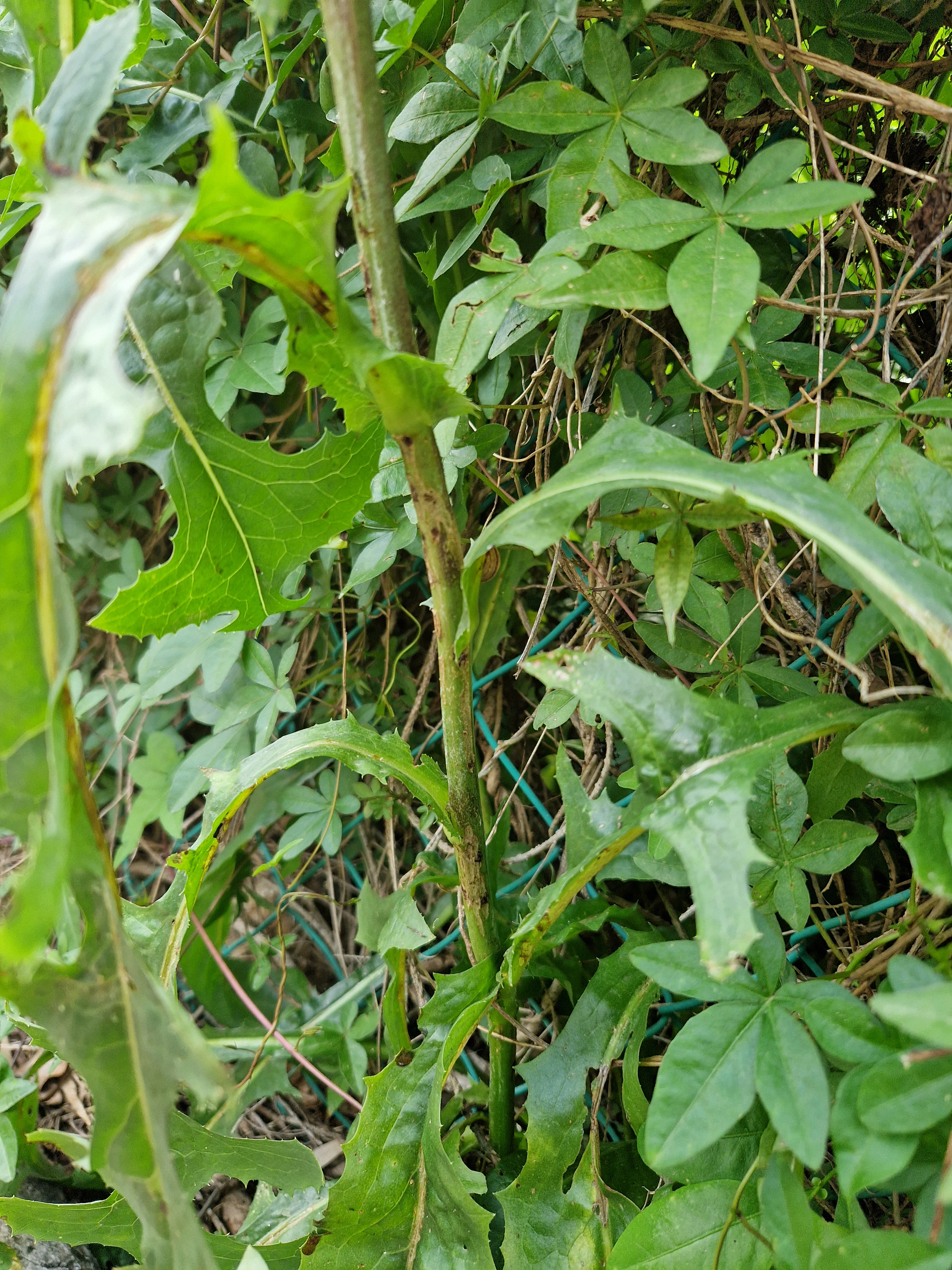
Leaves and stem of Lactuca tuberosa

Lactuca tuberosa is an ornamental plant in the family Asteraceae.
