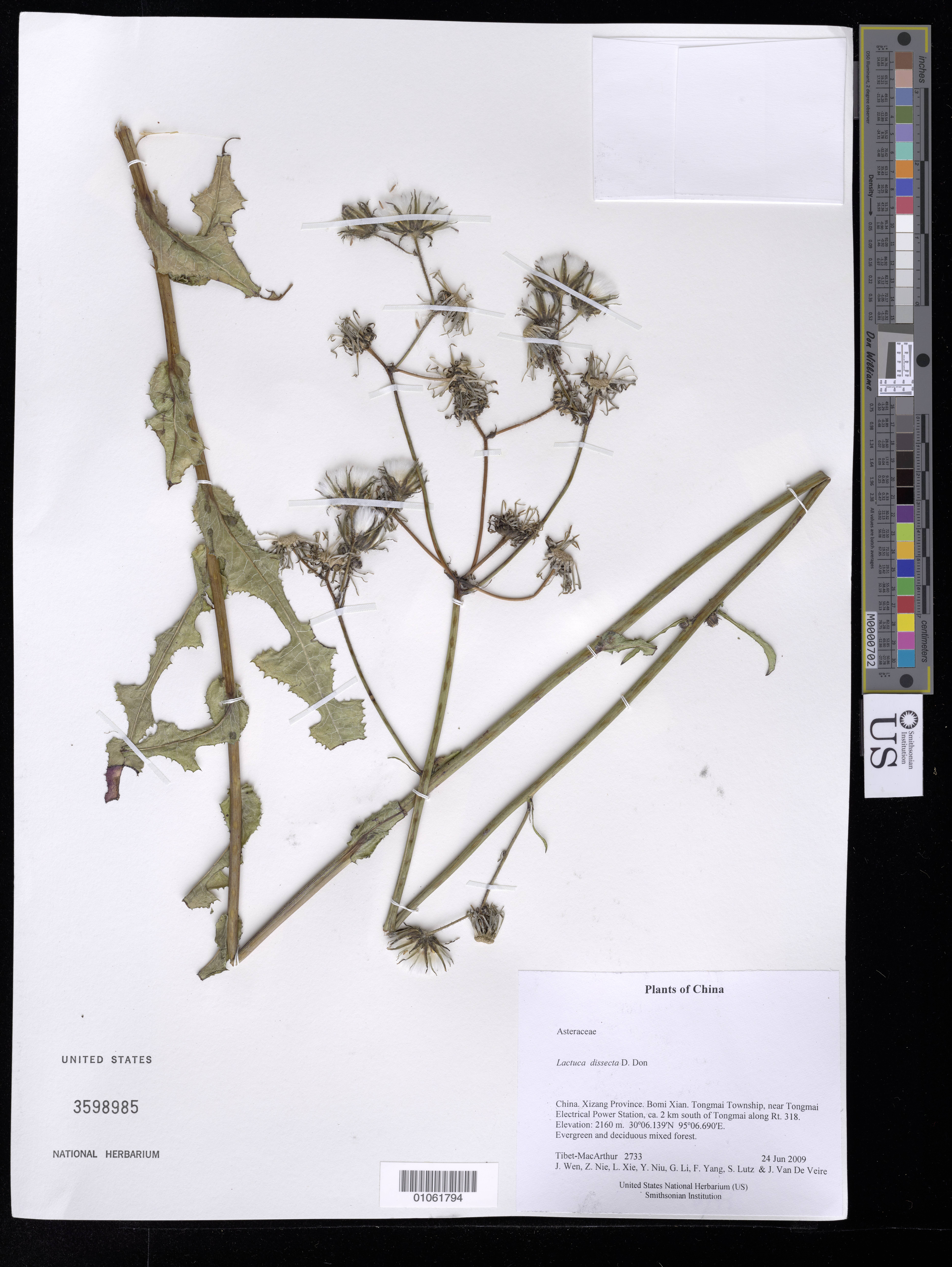

Scientific classification
- Kingdom: Plantae
- Clade: Tracheophytes
- Clade: Angiosperms
- Clade: Eudicots
- Clade: Asterids
- Order: Asterales
- Family: Asteraceae
- Genus: Lactuca
- Species: L. dissecta

Binomial name
- Lactuca dissecta D.Don 1825

Synonyms
- Lactuca auriculata DC.; Lactuca arvensis Edgew.; Lactuca stocksii Boiss.

= Lactuca dissecta =

Species of plant

Lactuca dissecta, the split-leaf lettuce, is an Asian species of plant in the tribe Cichorieae within the family Asteraceae. It is native to Central Asia, western China (Xinjiang, Tibet), the Himalayas, and southwest Asia as far west as Turkey.

Lactuca dissecta' is an annual herb, growing to 40 cm tall. Stems are solitary, erect, branching from the base, branches slender, hairless. Middle and lower part of the whole leaf is inverted-lance-shaped, deeply lobed or pinnately cut, 3–7 cm long, 1–3.5 cm wide, lateral lobes 3-6 pairs, diamond- or fan-shaped, round or toothed comb. Flowers are borne in clusters at the top and then leaves smaller, lanceolate or linear-lanceolate. All leaves are hairless, base stalkless, ear-shaped, arrow-shaped or semi-stem-clasping. Blue flower-heads are bore on top of the stem and branches arranged in loose corymbose inflorescence, each flower head containing ray flowers but no disc flowers. Achenes light brown, oblanceolate, long 2.3 mm, width of 1 mm. Pappus white, thin, hairy, 3 mm long.
