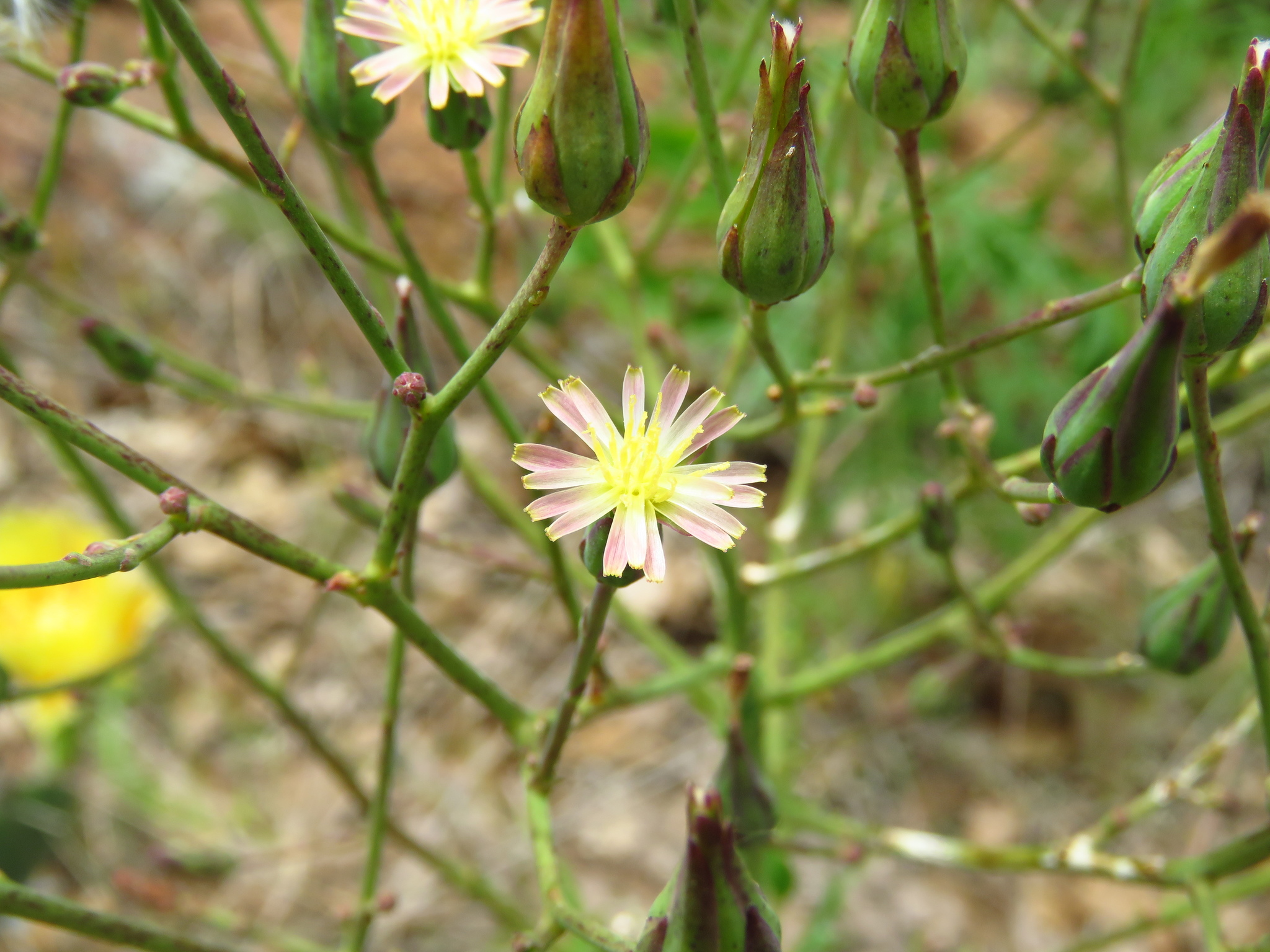

Scientific classification
- Kingdom: Plantae
- Clade: Tracheophytes
- Clade: Angiosperms
- Clade: Eudicots
- Clade: Asterids
- Order: Asterales
- Family: Asteraceae
- Genus: Lactuca
- Species: L. hirsuta

Binomial name
- Lactuca hirsuta Muhl. ex Nutt. 1818 not Franch. 1895

Synonyms
- Galathenium sanguineum (Bigelow) Nutt.; Lactuca sanguinea Bigelow; Lactuca villosa Torr. & A.Gray

= Lactuca hirsuta =

Species of plant

Lactuca hirsuta, the hairy lettuce or downy lettuce, is a North American species of wild lettuce. It is widespread across much of central Canada and the eastern and central United States from Ontario, Québec, Prince Edward Island, and Nova Scotia south as far as Texas, Louisiana, and Florida.

Lactuca hirsuta is an biennial herb in the dandelion tribe within the daisy family growing from a taproot a height of up to 200 cm (79 in; 6.6 ft). The top of the stem bears a multibranched inflorescence with many flower heads. Each head contains 12–24 blue ray florets but no disc florets. The fruit is a brown achene.
