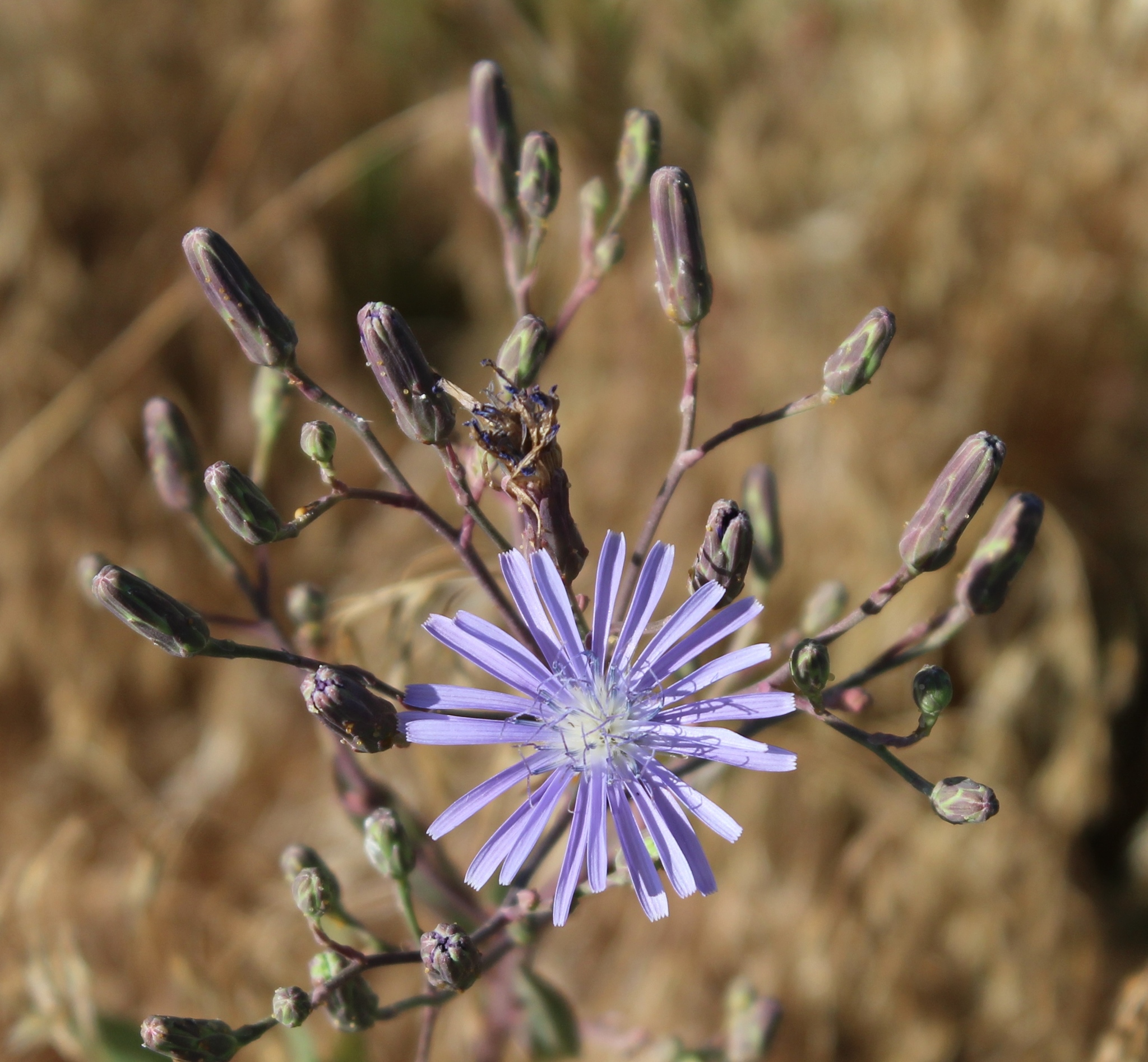
- Flower and buds

Scientific classification
- Kingdom: Plantae
- Clade: Tracheophytes
- Clade: Angiosperms
- Clade: Eudicots
- Clade: Asterids
- Order: Asterales
- Family: Asteraceae
- Genus: Lactuca
- Species: L. pulchella

Binomial name
- Lactuca pulchella DC.

= Lactuca pulchella =

Species of lettuce

Lactuca pulchella, known as blue lettuce, common blue lettuce, or wild blue lettuce, is a North American flowering plant in the sunflower family, Asteraceae. Some authors place it as a subspecies or variety of a broader concept of Lactuca tatarica, while others consider L. tatarica to occur only in Europe and Asia. Lactuca pulchella (with L. tatarica and others) is commonly separated into the genus Mulgedium, as Mulgedium pulchellum.

== Uses ==
Among the Zuni people of New Mexico in the southwestern United States, the dried root gum of Lactuca pulchella has been used as chewing gum.
