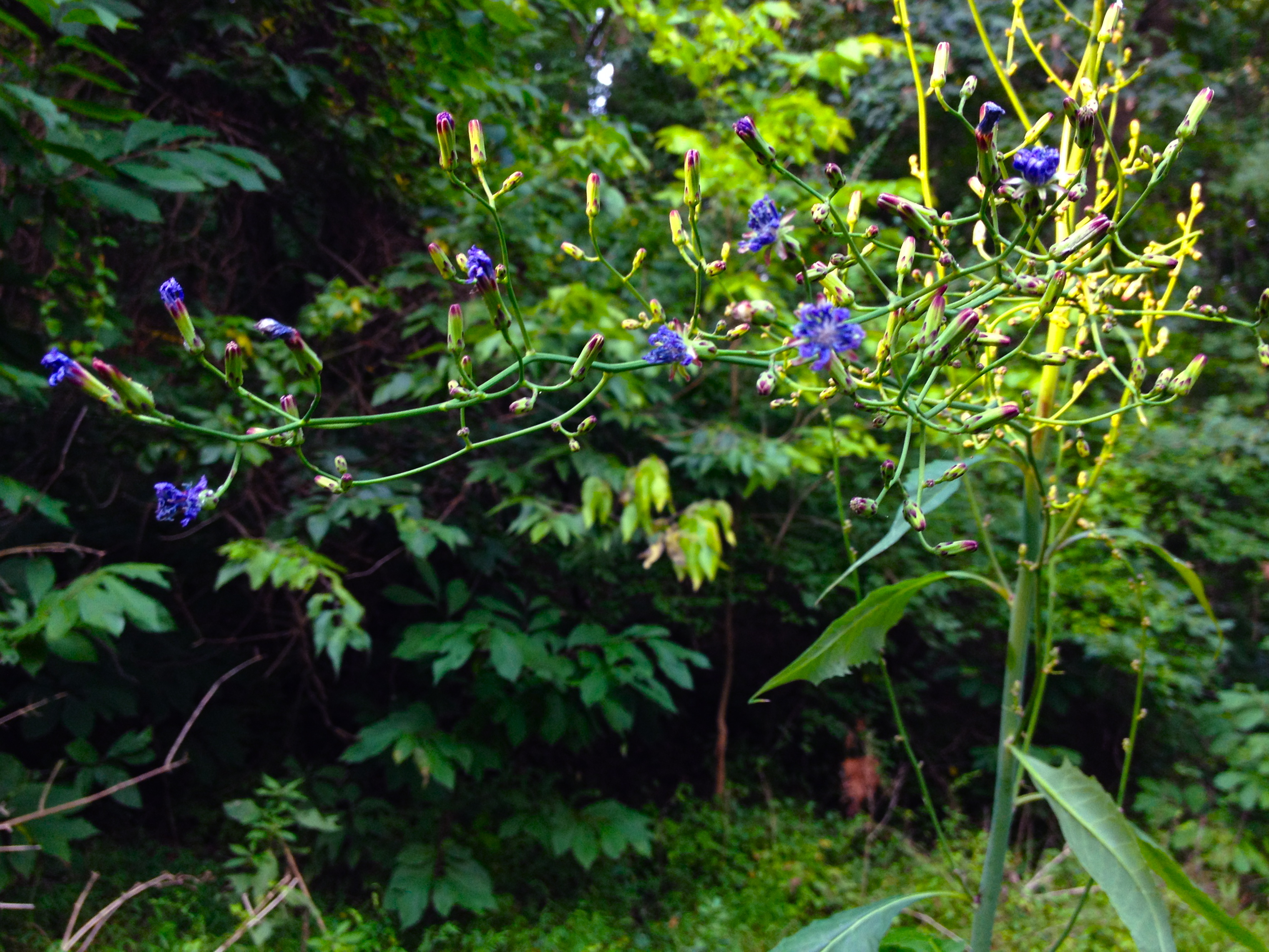

Conservation status
- Secure (NatureServe)

Scientific classification
- Kingdom: Plantae
- Clade: Tracheophytes
- Clade: Angiosperms
- Clade: Eudicots
- Clade: Asterids
- Order: Asterales
- Family: Asteraceae
- Genus: Lactuca
- Species: L. floridana

Binomial name
- Lactuca floridana (L.) Gaertn. 1791

Synonyms
- Synonymy: Sonchus floridanus L. 1753; Galathenium floridanum (L.) Nutt.; Mulgedium floridanum (L.) DC.; Cicerbita acuminata (Willd.) Wallr.; Cicerbita borealis Wallr.; Cicerbita floridana (L.) Wallr.; Cicerbita villosa (Jacq.) Beauverd; Lactuca acuminata (Willd.) A.Gray; Lactuca villosa Jacq.; Mulgedium acuminatum (Willd.) DC.; Mulgedium lyratum Cass.; Mulgedium villosum (Jacq.) Small; Sonchus acuminatus Willd.; Sonchus lapponicus Froel.; Wiestia acuminata Sch.Bip.; Wiestia floridana (L.) Sch.Bip.

= Lactuca floridana =

Woodland lettuce

Species of lettuce

Lactuca floridana, commonly known as woodland lettuce, Florida lettuce, or false lettuce, is a North American species of wild lettuce. It is native across much of central Canada and the eastern and central United States.

Lactuca floridana is an annual or biennial plant in the Cichorieae (dandelion) tribe within the Asteraceae (daisy) family. Lactuca floridana was found to contain 11β,13-Dihydro-lactucin-8-O-acetate hemihydrate.

== Description ==
L. floridana is a tall plant, growing to a height of 0.9–2.4 m (3–8 ft). It is usually unbranched with a central stem that is light or reddish green and hairless. It has a pure white, milky sap. The leaves are alternate, lanceolate-oblong, and up to 25 cm (10 in) long and 8 cm (3 in) across. The largest leaves are often deeply pinnately lobed, although the leaves in general are variable and can be lobed or unlobed.

The top of the stem bears a multibranched inflorescence with many flower heads. Each head contains 10–20 blue or white ray florets but no disc florets. The fruit is a brown achene.

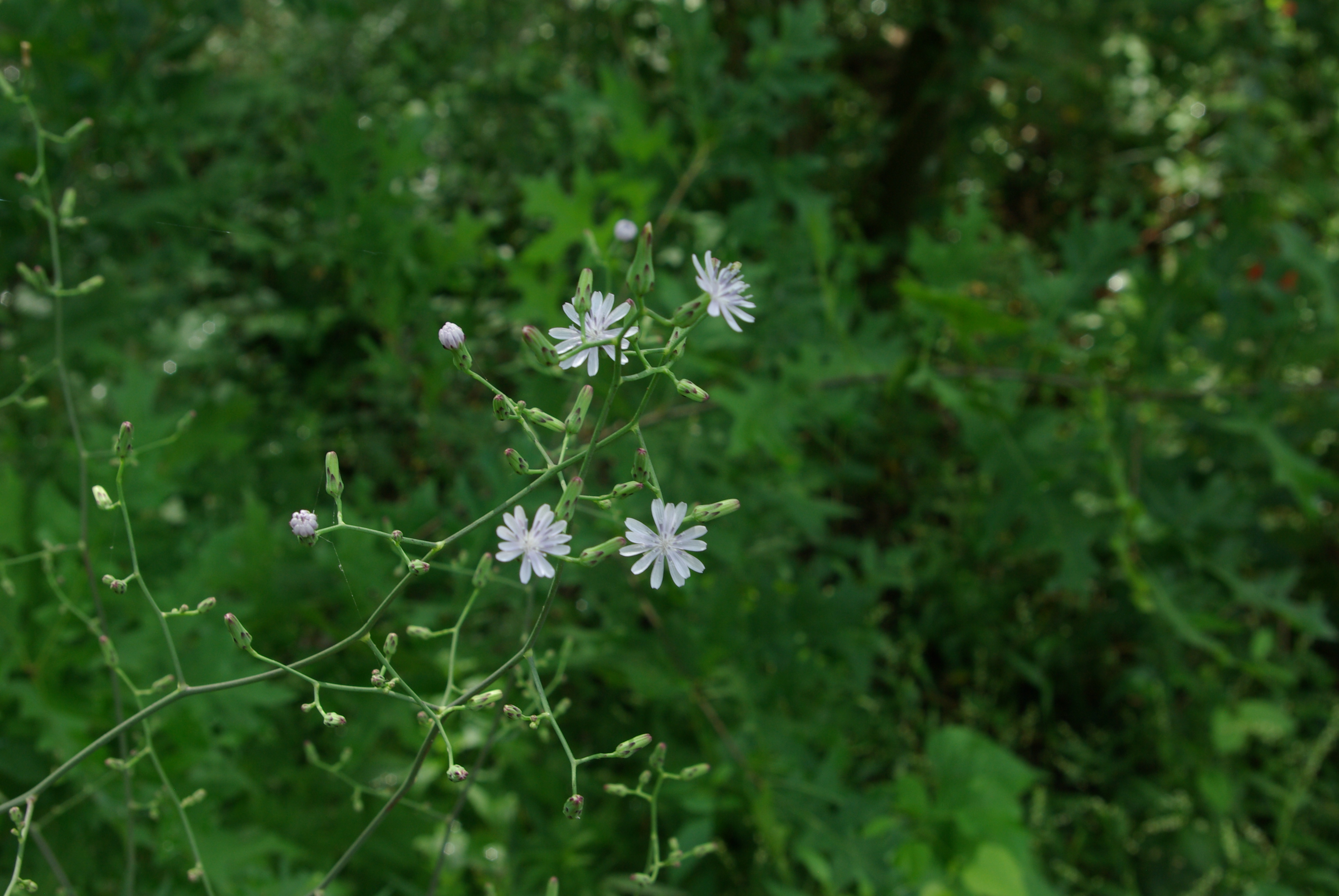
Flowers on woodland lettuce

== Etymology ==
The genus name Lactuca is based on the Latin word for milk, "lac", and refers to the milky sap. The specific epithet means "of Florida".

== Distribution and habitat ==
L. floridana is native in the United States from Texas in the west, Florida in the south, Massachusetts in the east, and the Canadian border in the north. In Canada it is native in Manitoba and Ontario, although it is possibly extirpated in Manitoba and it's critically imperiled in Ontario. Habitats include disturbed areas, prairies, along roadsides, pastures, and miscellaneous waste areas.

== Ecology ==
The plant blooms from July to October, and the nectar and pollen of the flowers attract bees.

== Uses ==
The plant is edible and can be cooked and eaten as greens.
