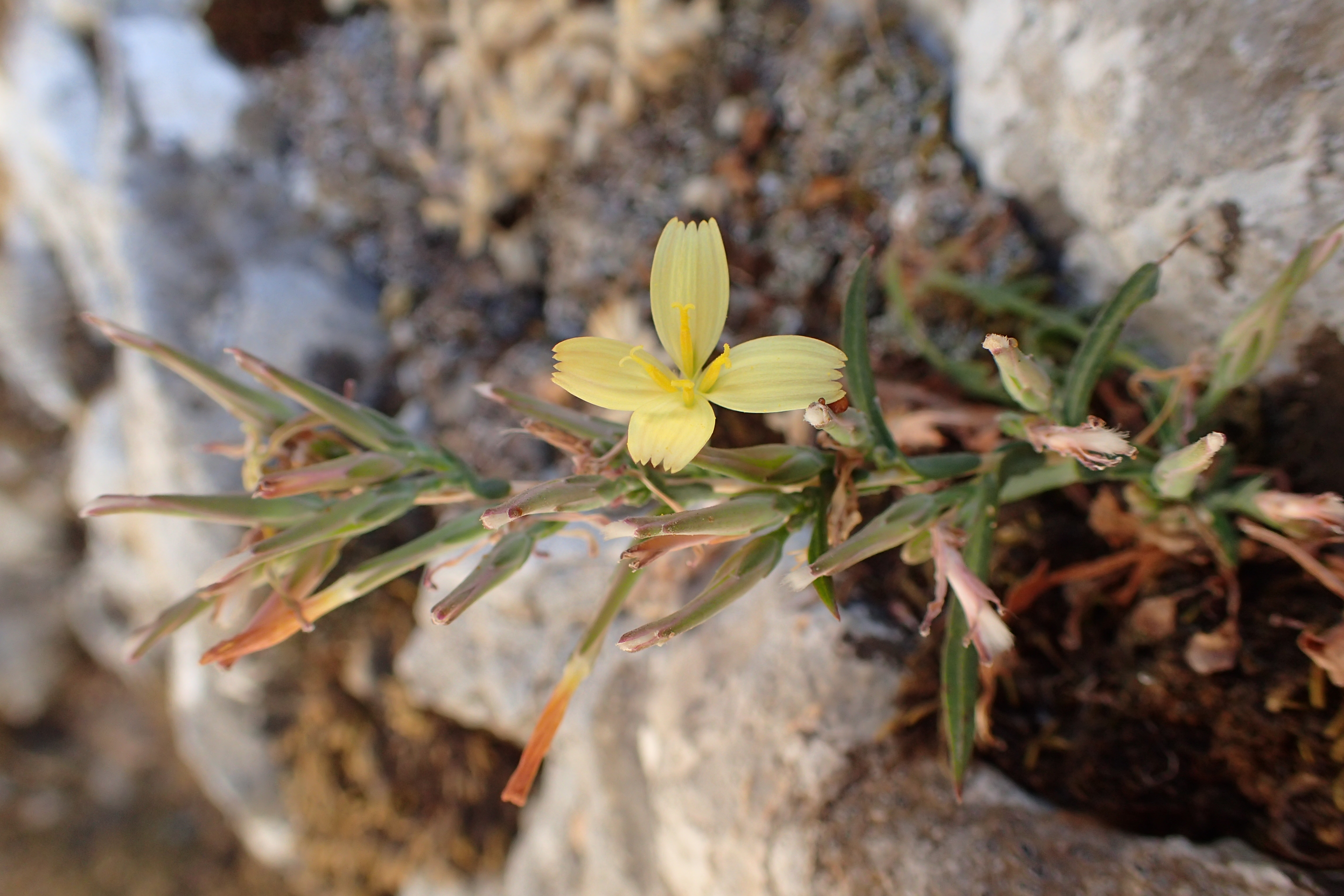

Conservation status
- Near Threatened (IUCN 3.1)

Scientific classification
- Kingdom: Plantae
- Clade: Tracheophytes
- Clade: Angiosperms
- Clade: Eudicots
- Clade: Asterids
- Order: Asterales
- Family: Asteraceae
- Genus: Lactuca
- Species: L. alpestris

Binomial name
- Lactuca alpestris (Gand.) Rech. f.

Synonyms
- Lactuca viminea subsp. alpestris; Lactuca viminea var. decumbens; Phaenixopus alpestris: Scariola alpestris

= Lactuca alpestris =

Species of plant

Lactuca alpestris is a species of plant native to Crete in the Ida mountains and is a relative of lettuce.

It is perennial and has yellow flowers. Its achenes are 7m to 8m long. The species grows on rocky slopes, dwarf shrub communities, calcareous garrigue, scree, and rubble. IUCN Red list states the species is threatened due to climate change and agriculture.
