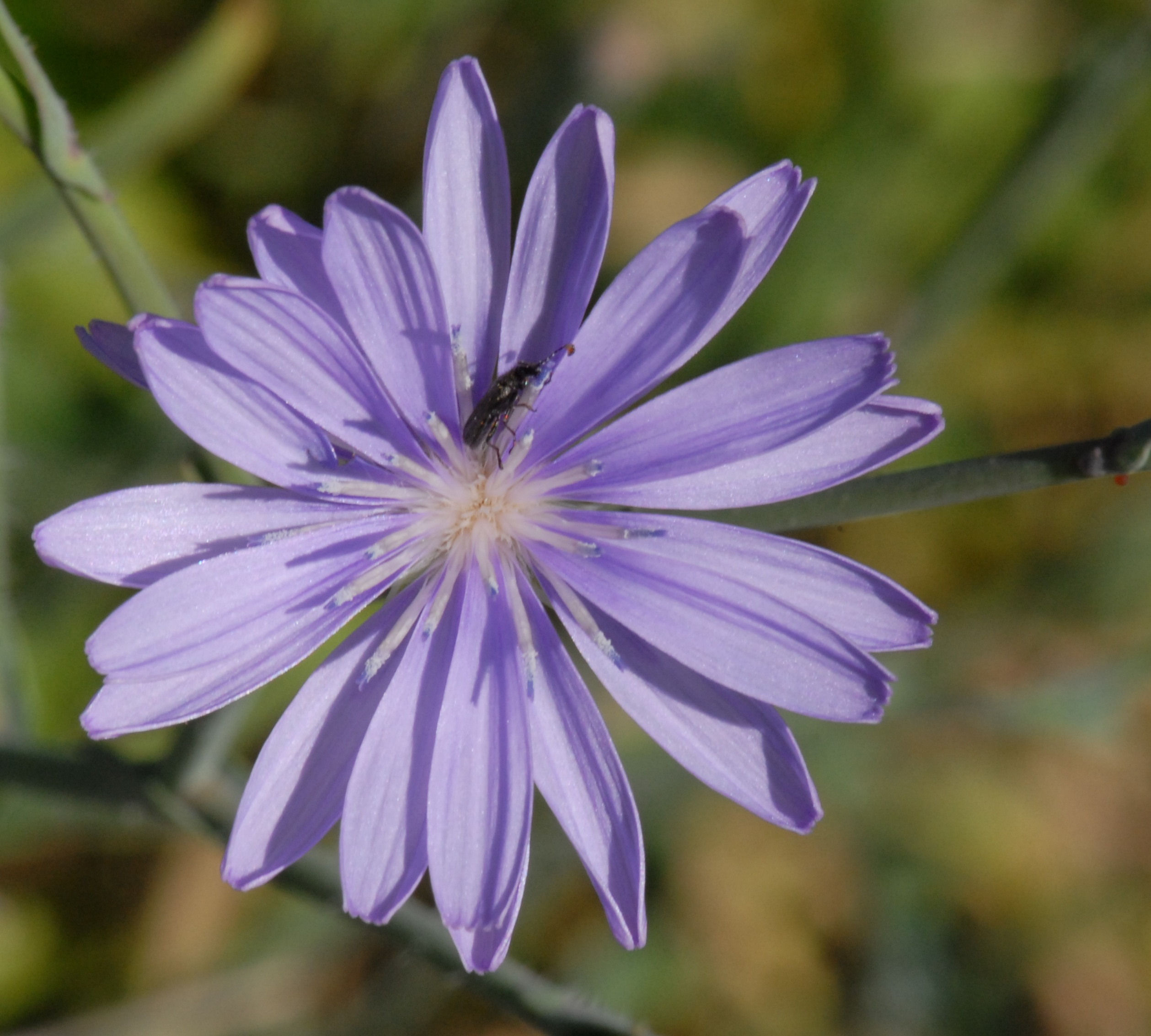

Scientific classification
- Kingdom: Plantae
- Clade: Tracheophytes
- Clade: Angiosperms
- Clade: Eudicots
- Clade: Asterids
- Order: Asterales
- Family: Asteraceae
- Genus: Lactuca
- Species: L. tenerrima

Binomial name
- Lactuca tenerrima Pourr.

Synonyms
- List: Cicerbita tenerrima Beauverd; Lactuca segusiana Balb.; Wiestia tenerrima Sch.Bip.

= Lactuca tenerrima =

Species of plant

Lactuca tenerrima is a species of wild lettuce native to southern France, Spain, the Balearic Islands, and the Atlas Mountains of Morocco. Unlike other species in its genus Lactuca, even in its family Asteraceae, it does not produce bitter-tasting sesquiterpene lactones.
