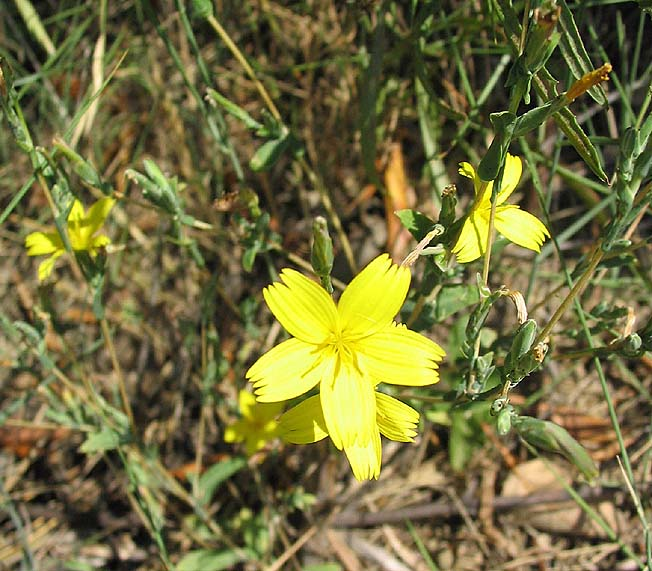

Scientific classification
- Kingdom: Plantae
- Clade: Tracheophytes
- Clade: Angiosperms
- Clade: Eudicots
- Clade: Asterids
- Order: Asterales
- Family: Asteraceae
- Genus: Lactuca
- Species: L. viminea

Binomial name
- Lactuca viminea (L.) J.Presl & C.Presl 1819 not C.B.Clarke 1876

Synonyms
- Synonymy: Prenanthes viminea L., 1753; Scariola viminea (L.) F.W.Schmidt; Scariola tetrantha (B.L.Burtt & P.H.Davis) Soják; Lactuca chondrilliflora subsp. contracta (Velen.) Nyman; Lactuca contracta Velen.; Lactuca numidica Batt.; Scariola contracta (Velen.) Soják

= Lactuca viminea =

Species of lettuce

Lactuca viminea, the pliant lettuce, is a Eurasian plant species in the tribe Cichorieae within the family Asteraceae. It is widespread across much of Europe and southwestern Asia from Portugal to Pakistan.

Lactuca viminea is a branching subshrub up to 30 cm tall. Leaves near the base are pinnately lobed, but the leaves on the stem are narrow and linear, not lobed, becoming smaller higher up the plant. The uppermost leaves are pressed against the stem and almost scale-like. Flower heads have 4–5 yellow ray flowers, but no disc flowers.

Subspecies

- Lactuca viminea subsp. chondrilliflora (Boreau) St.-Lag.
- Lactuca viminea subsp. ramosissima (All.) Arcang.
- Lactuca viminea subsp. viminea
