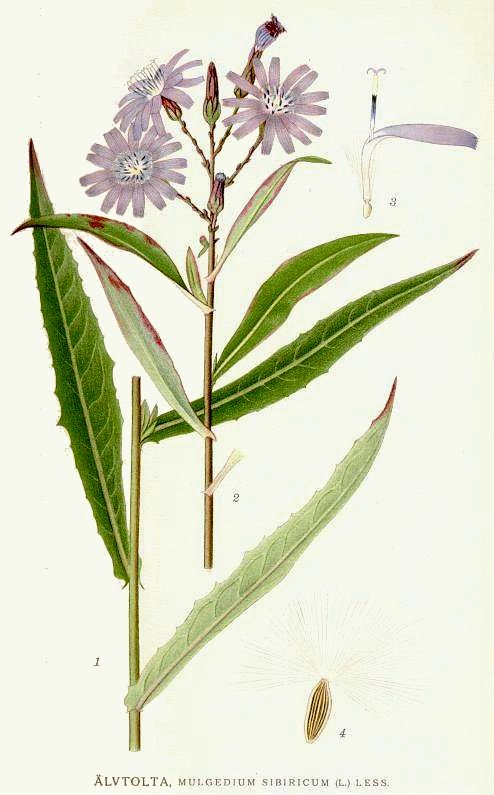
- Botanical illustration

Scientific classification
- Kingdom: Plantae
- Clade: Tracheophytes
- Clade: Angiosperms
- Clade: Eudicots
- Clade: Asterids
- Order: Asterales
- Family: Asteraceae
- Genus: Lactuca
- Species: L. sibirica

Binomial name
- Lactuca sibirica (L.) Benth. ex Maxim.

Synonyms
- List: Agathyrsus sibiricus (L.) D.Don; Lagedium sibiricum (L.) Soják; Mulgedium kamtschaticum Ledeb.; Mulgedium sibiricum (L.) Less.; Sonchus maritimus Pall. ex Ledeb.; Sonchus sibiricus L.

= Lactuca sibirica =

Species of plant

Lactuca sibirica, the Siberian lettuce, is a species of wild lettuce native to Norway, Sweden, Finland, the Baltic states, Belarus, Ukraine, all parts of Russia, Kazakhstan, Mongolia, the northern half of China, the Korean peninsula, Sakhalin, the Kuril Islands, and Japan. It is the host of the systemic rust fungi Puccinia minussensis, which propagates with it along its ramets, resulting in complex host-parasite interactions.
