= Lactuca dolichophylla =

Scientific classification
- Kingdom: Plantae
- Clade: Tracheophytes
- Clade: Angiosperms
- Clade: Eudicots
- Clade: Asterids
- Order: Asterales
- Family: Asteraceae
- Genus: Lactuca
- Species: L. dolichophylla

Binomial name
- Lactuca dolichophylla Kitam.

Synonyms
- List: Chondrilla longifolia Wall.; Lactuca handeliana S.Y.Hu; Lactuca longifolia DC.; Lactuca wallichiana Tuisl; Mulgedium sagittatum Royle

Species of plant

Lactuca dolichophylla, the long-leaved lettuce, is a species of wild lettuce found in Afghanistan, Pakistan, West Himalaya, Nepal, Xizang (Tibet), East Himalaya, south-central China, and Myanmar. It prefers to grow in thickets at c.3200 m above sea level. Its chromosome count is 2n=16.
