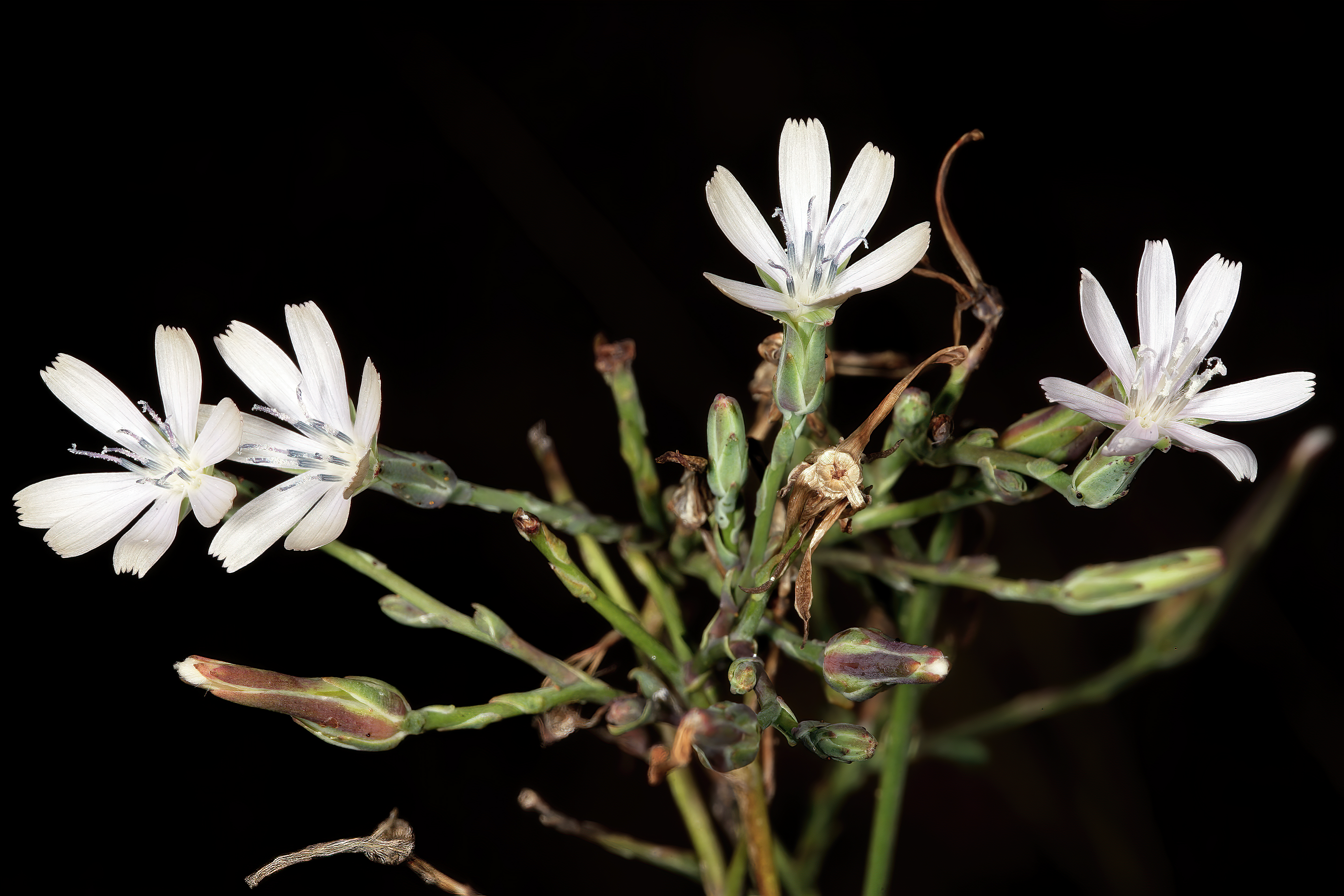

Scientific classification
- Kingdom: Plantae
- Clade: Tracheophytes
- Clade: Angiosperms
- Clade: Eudicots
- Clade: Asterids
- Order: Asterales
- Family: Asteraceae
- Genus: Lactuca
- Species: L. inermis

Binomial name
- Lactuca inermis Forssk.

Synonyms
- List: Lactuca abyssinica Fresen.; Lactuca capensis Thunb.; Lactuca hochstetteri Sch.Bip. ex Hochst.; Lactuca kenyaensis Stebbins; Lactuca lebrunii Robyns; Lactuca leptocephala Stebbins; Lactuca pallidicoerulea Dinter; Lactuca rariflora Fresen.; Lactuca seretii De Wild.; Lactuca vanderystii De Wild.; Pyrrhopappus hochstetteri A.Rich.; Scorzonera capensis Thunb.

= Lactuca inermis =

Species of plant

Lactuca inermis is a species of wild lettuce native to sub-Saharan Africa, Madagascar, and the Arabian peninsula. A pioneer species often found in disturbed areas, it is of variable height, from very short (5 cm) to quite tall (240 cm) and woody. Local people consume its young leaves, perhaps with a light boiling, as a salad green or vegetable.

== Varieties ==
Two varieties are currently accepted:

- Lactuca inermis var. inermis
- Lactuca inermis var. myriocephala (Dethier) Lawalrée
