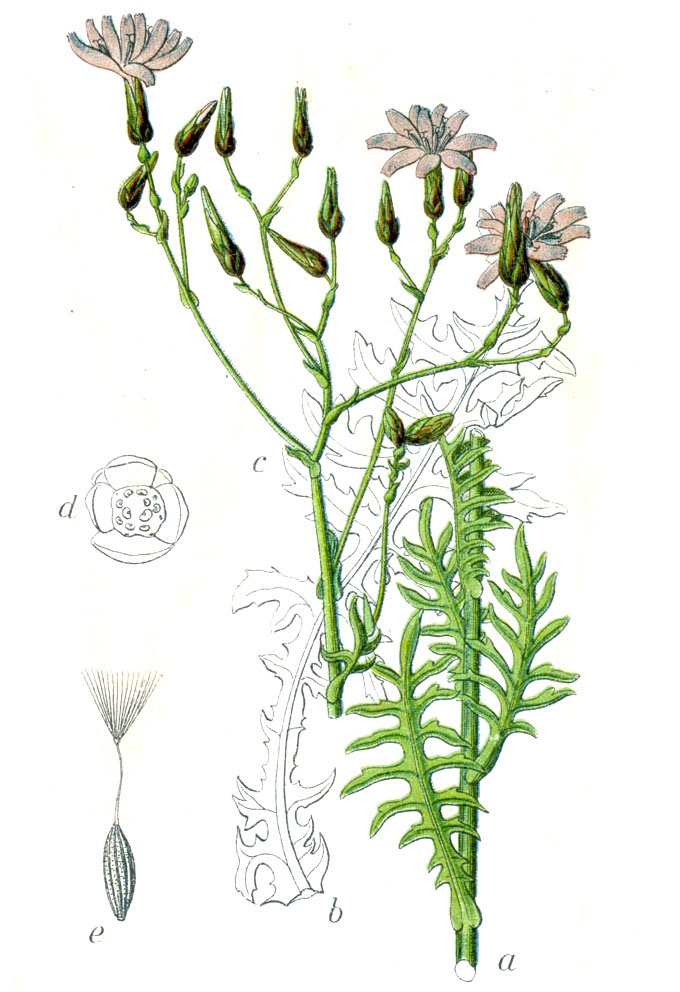
- 1796 illustration

Conservation status
- Data Deficient (IUCN 3.1)

Scientific classification
- Kingdom: Plantae
- Clade: Tracheophytes
- Clade: Angiosperms
- Clade: Eudicots
- Clade: Asterids
- Order: Asterales
- Family: Asteraceae
- Genus: Lactuca
- Species: L. perennis

Binomial name
- Lactuca perennis L. 1753

= Lactuca perennis =

Species of lettuce

Lactuca perennis, common names: mountain lettuce, blue lettuce or perennial lettuce, is a perennial herbaceous plant species belonging to the genus Lactuca of the family Asteraceae. It is widespread across most of central and southern Europe. Its leaves are edible.

== Description ==
Lactuca perennis reaches on average 60 centimetres (24 in) of height, with a minimum height of 20 centimetres (7.9 in). This plant is glabrous, the stems are erect and branched, leaves are greyish-green, the lower ones with a small petioles, the upper ones partly amplexicaul. It is hermaphrodite and entomophilous. The flowers are violet-blue, with a size of 30–40 millimetres (1.2–1.6 in). The flowering period extends from April through August and the seeds ripen from July until September.

In southern France it is sometimes referred to by its Occitan name “breou” or “breu”

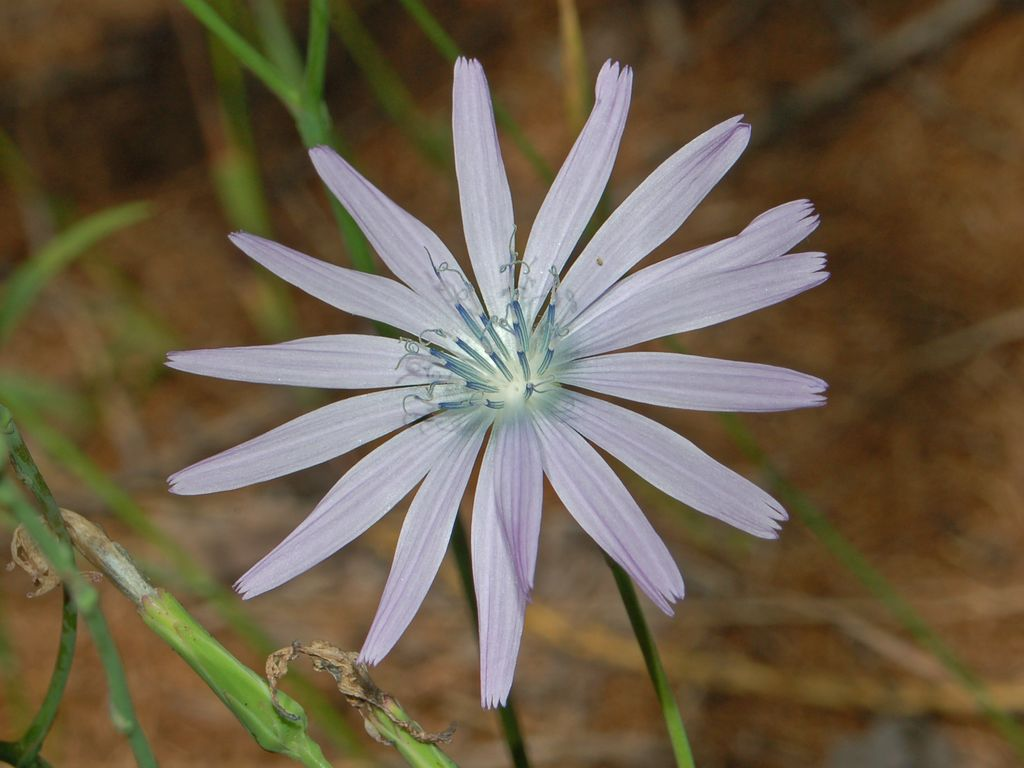
Flower of Lactuca perennis

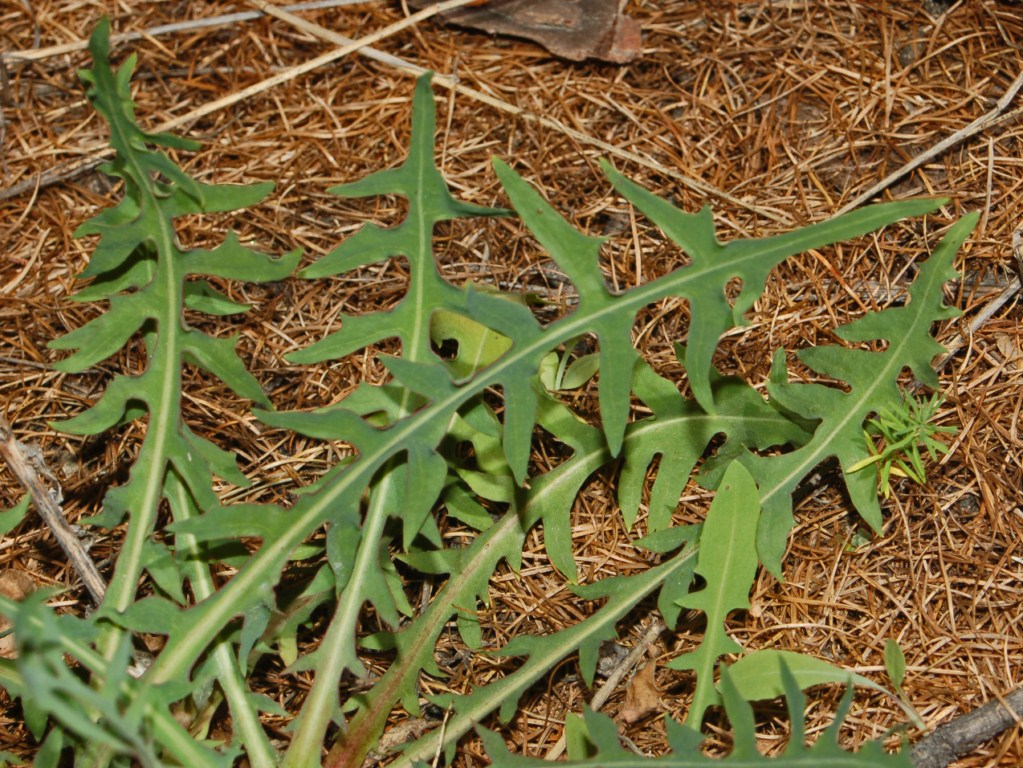
Leaves of Lactuca perennis

== Habitat ==
These plants prefer calcareous well-drained soils and they are common on sunny rocky soils, on dry meadows, on roadsides and on banks of rivers. They can be found on average at 500–2,000 metres (1,600–6,600 ft) above sea level.
