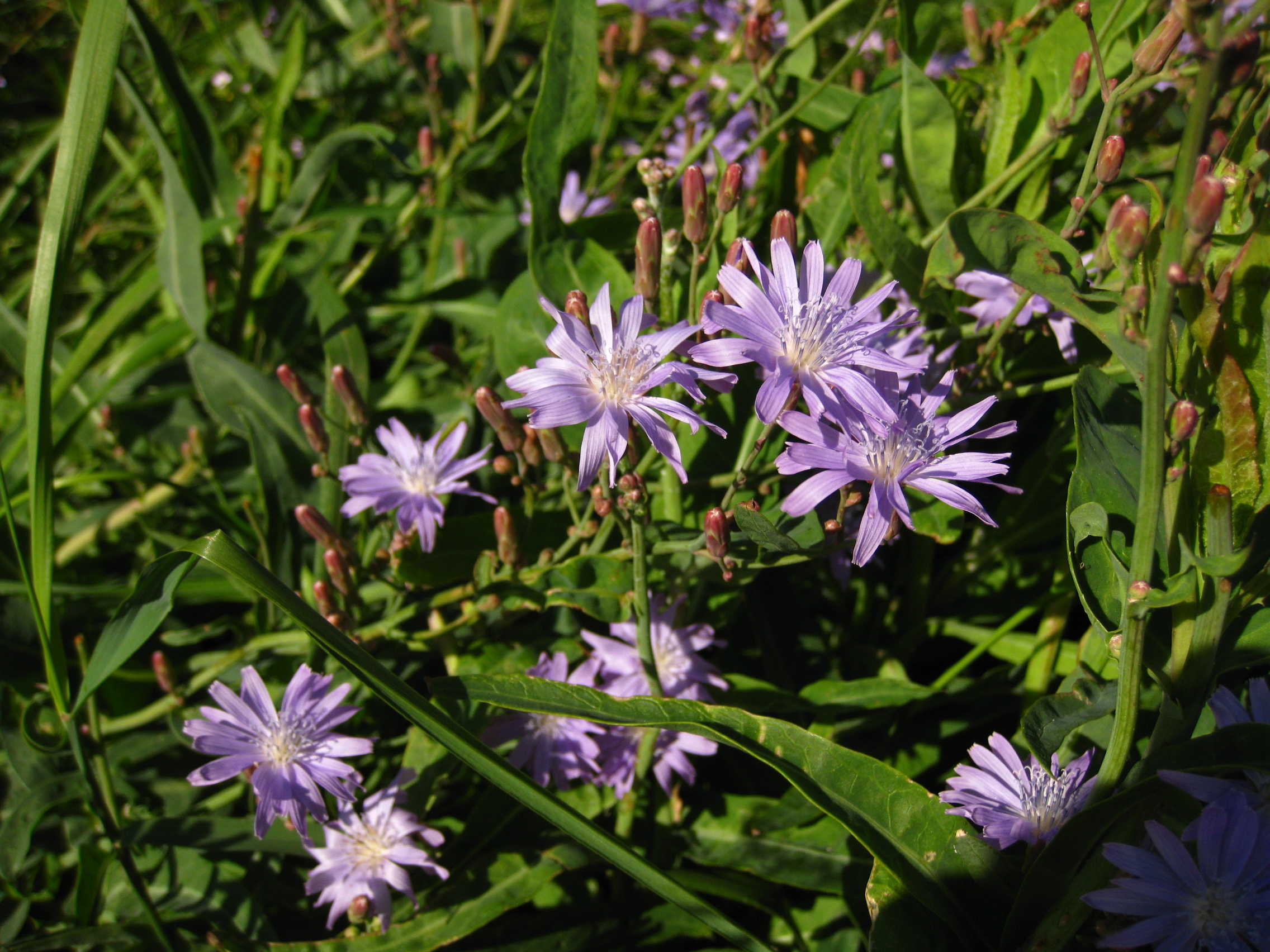

Conservation status
- Least Concern (IUCN 2.3)

Scientific classification
- Kingdom: Plantae
- Clade: Tracheophytes
- Clade: Angiosperms
- Clade: Eudicots
- Clade: Asterids
- Order: Asterales
- Family: Asteraceae
- Genus: Lactuca
- Species: L. tatarica

Binomial name
- Lactuca tatarica (L.) C.A.Mey.

Synonyms
- List: Agathyrsus tataricus (L.) D.Don; Crepis charbonnelii H.Lév.; Lactuca canadensis var. integrifolia (Torr. & A.Gray) Farw.; Lactuca clarkei Hook.f.; Lactuca elongata var. integrifolia Torr. & A.Gray; Lactuca integrifolia Bigelow; Lactuca multipes H.Lév. & Vaniot; Lactuca tatarica var. integra (Regel) V.Ferakova; Lactuca tatarica f. stevensii B.Boivin; Lagedium tataricum (L.) Soják; Mulgedium alatoicum C.H.An; Mulgedium aurora Sch.Bip. ex Nyman; Mulgedium roborovskii Tzvelev; Mulgedium runcinatum Cass.; Mulgedium sonchifolium Vis. & Pancic; Mulgedium tataricum (L.) DC.; Sonchus lactucoides Bunge; Sonchus tataricus L.; Sonchus volhynicus Besser ex Nyman; Wiestia tatarica (L.) Sch.Bip.

= Lactuca tatarica =

Species of lettuce

Lactuca tatarica, known as blue lettuce, is a Eurasian flowering plant in the tribe Cichorieae within the family Asteraceae. It is widespread across much of Europe and Asia.

Lactuca tatarica is a herb up to 60 cm (2 feet) tall with a large taproot. Most of the leaves are near the base of the plant and are larger than leaves higher up the stem. Each flower head has about 20 blue or purple (rarely white) ray flowers and no disc flowers.

Some authors have placed the North American species Lactuca pulchella as a subspecies or variety of a broader concept of Lactuca tatarica, while others consider L. tatarica to occur only in Europe and Asia. Lactuca tatarica (with L. pulchella and others) is commonly separated into the genus Mulgedium, as Mulgedium tatarica.
