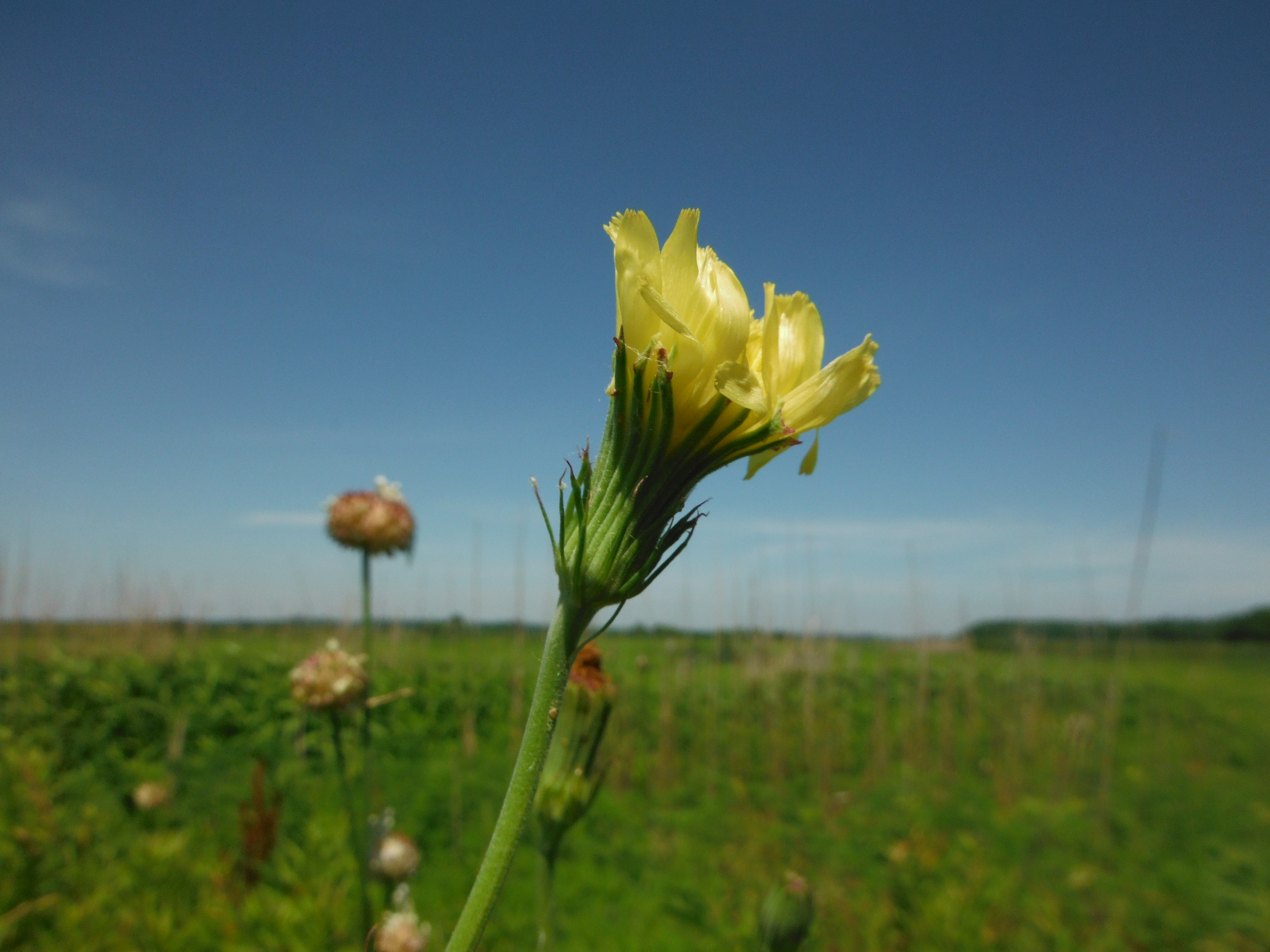
- Pyrrhopappus carolinianus at Goose Pond Fish and Wildlife Reserve, Indiana

Scientific classification
- Kingdom: Plantae
- Clade: Embryophytes
- Clade: Tracheophytes
- Clade: Spermatophytes
- Clade: Angiosperms
- Clade: Eudicots
- Clade: Asterids
- Order: Asterales
- Family: Asteraceae
- Genus: Pyrrhopappus
- Species: P. carolinianus

Binomial name
- Pyrrhopappus carolinianus (Walter) DC.

Synonyms
- Pyrrhopappus georgianus Shinners; Sitilias caroliniana (Walter) Raf.

= Pyrrhopappus carolinianus =

Species of plant

Pyrrhopappus carolinianus, commonly called Carolina desert-chicory or Texas dandelion, is in the genus Pyrrhopappus of the family Asteraceae, native throughout Eastern and South Eastern United States. It is an annual found in mostly open grasslands and wet roadsides. P. carolinianus can bloom from spring to frost with the heads facing the sun throughout the day.

P. carolinianus has been observed growing in habitats such as the edges of marshes, sandpine-oak woodlands, and savannas.

== Pollination ==
Oligolectic bees in the genus Hemihalictus have been found to pollinate the Carolina desert-chicory.

== Ecology ==
Pyrrhopappus carolinianus is insect pollinated and is recorded to have been visited in northern Florida by Augochloropsis sumptuosa,and Halictus poeyi/ligatus.
