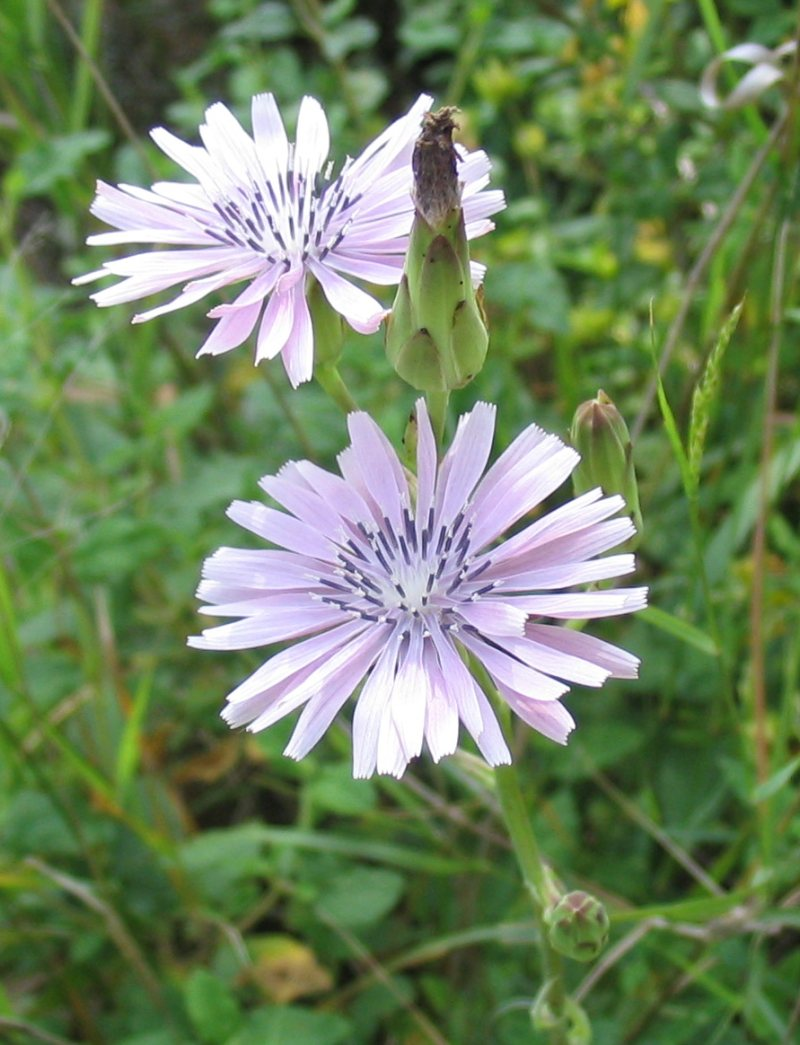
- Lactuca tuberosa

Scientific classification
- Kingdom: Plantae
- Clade: Embryophytes
- Clade: Tracheophytes
- Clade: Angiosperms
- Clade: Eudicots
- Clade: Asterids
- Order: Asterales
- Family: Asteraceae
- Subfamily: Cichorioideae
- Tribe: Cichorieae
- Subtribe: Lactucinae
- Genus: Lactuca; L.

Synonyms
- Agathyrsus D. Don; Bunioseris Jord.; Cephalorrhynchus Boiss.; Cyanoseris (W.D.J.Koch) Schur; Lactucella Nazarova; Lactucopsis Schultz Bipontinus ex Visiani; Lagedium Soják; Mulgedium Cassini; Mycelis Cass.; Phaenixopus Cassini; Phoenicopus Spach; Pterocypsela C. Shih; Scariola F. W. Schmidt; Wiestia Sch.Bip.

= Lactuca =

Genus of lettuces

Lactuca, commonly known as lettuce, is a genus of flowering plants in the family Asteraceae. The genus includes at 117 recognized species, distributed worldwide, but mainly in temperate Eurasia.

Its best-known representative is the garden lettuce (Lactuca sativa), with its many varieties. "Wild lettuce" commonly refers to the wild-growing relatives of common garden lettuce. Many species are common weeds. Lactuca species are diverse and take a wide variety of forms. They are annuals, biennials, perennials, or shrubs. Their flower heads have yellow, blue, or white ray florets. Some species are bitter-tasting.

Most wild lettuces are xerophytes, adapted to dry habitat types. Some occur in more moist areas, such as the mountains of central Africa.

Research revealed substantial genome size variation within the genus, ranging from 2.1 Gb in ''L. saligna'' to 5.5 Gb in ''L. indica''. This expansion is primarily driven by the proliferation of repetitive elements and is associated with low DNA methylation levels (specifically CHH methylation) and reduced expression of the ''CMT2'' gene

== Diversity ==
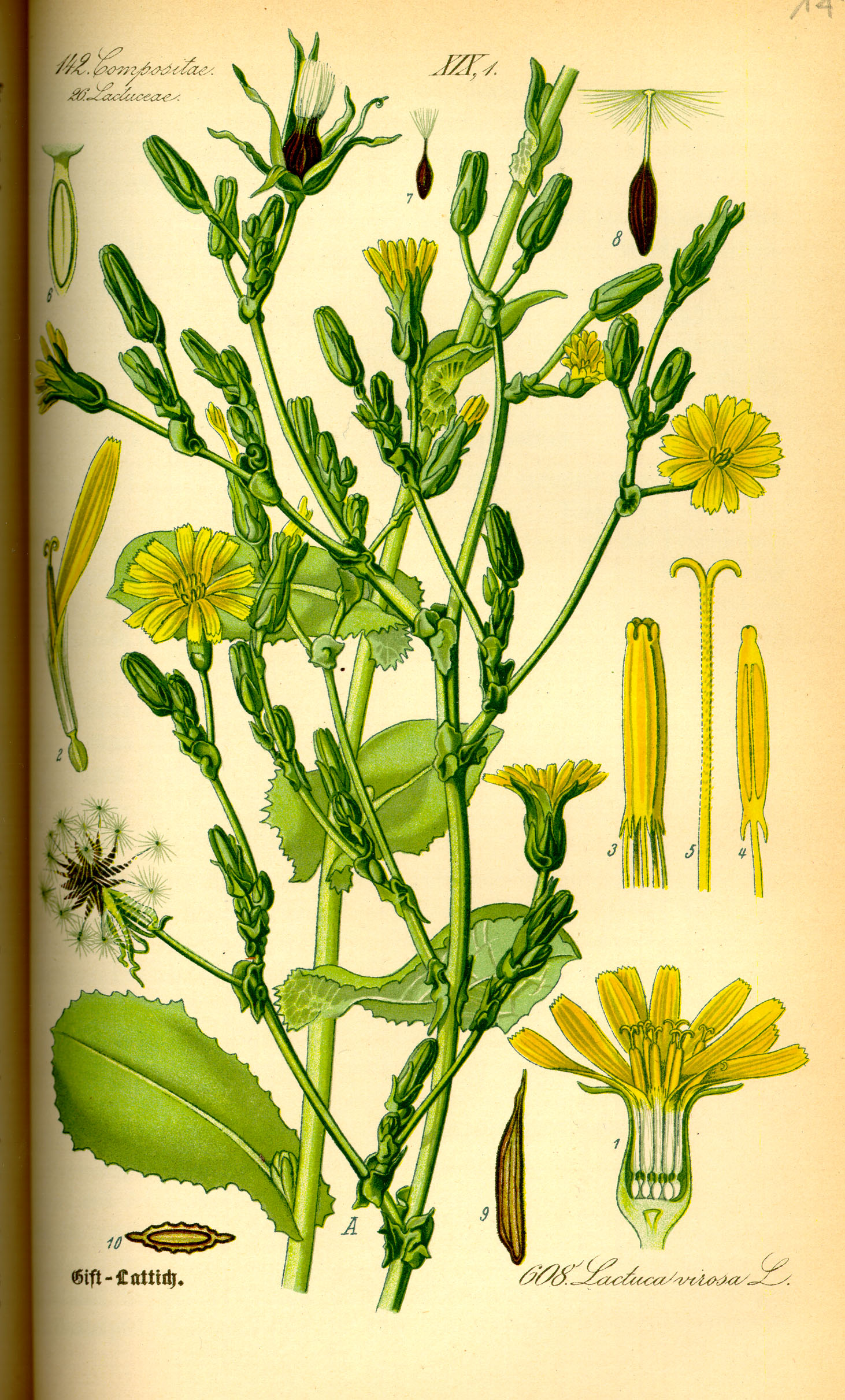
Wild lettuce (Lactuca virosa) by Otto Wilhelm Thome in Flora von Deutschland, Österreich und der Schweiz, 1885

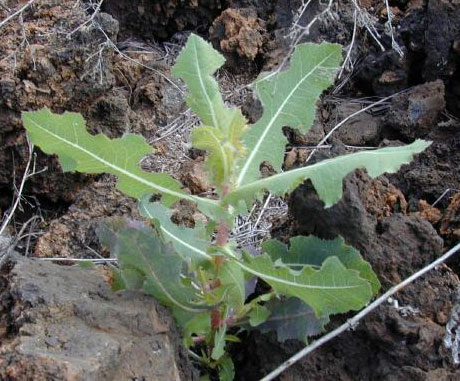
Prickly lettuce (Lactuca serriola)

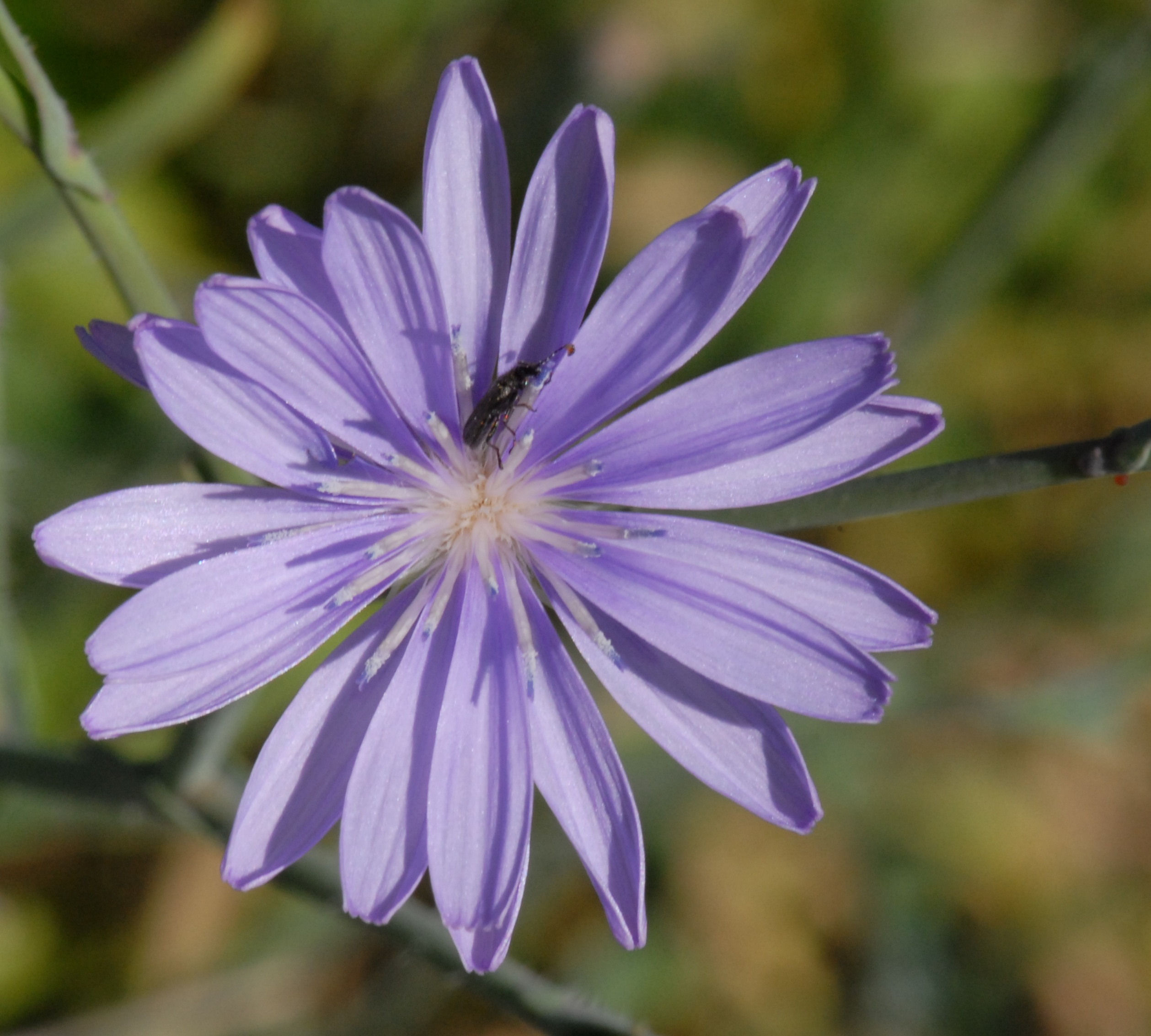
Lactuca tenerrima

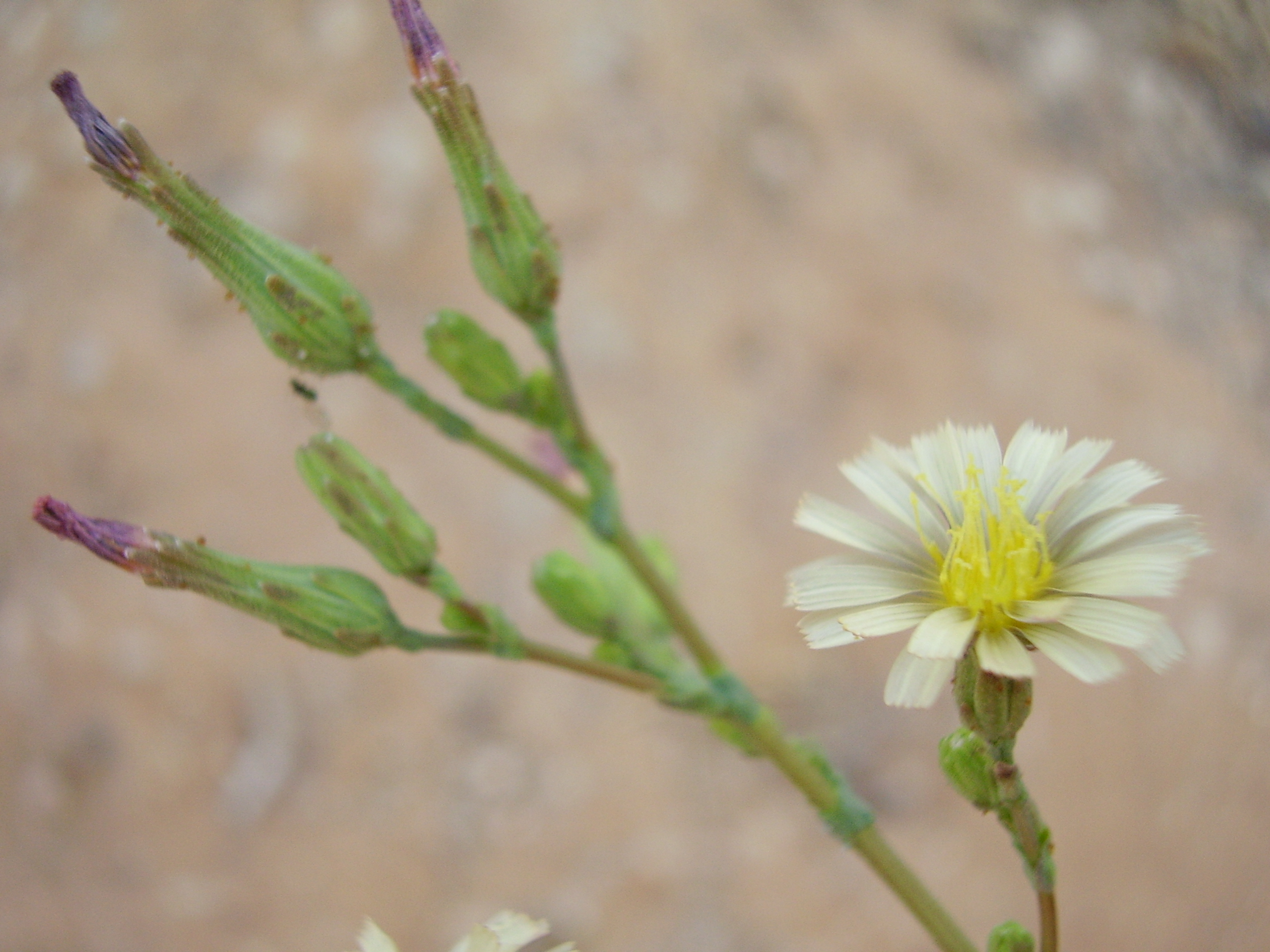
Lactuca serriola

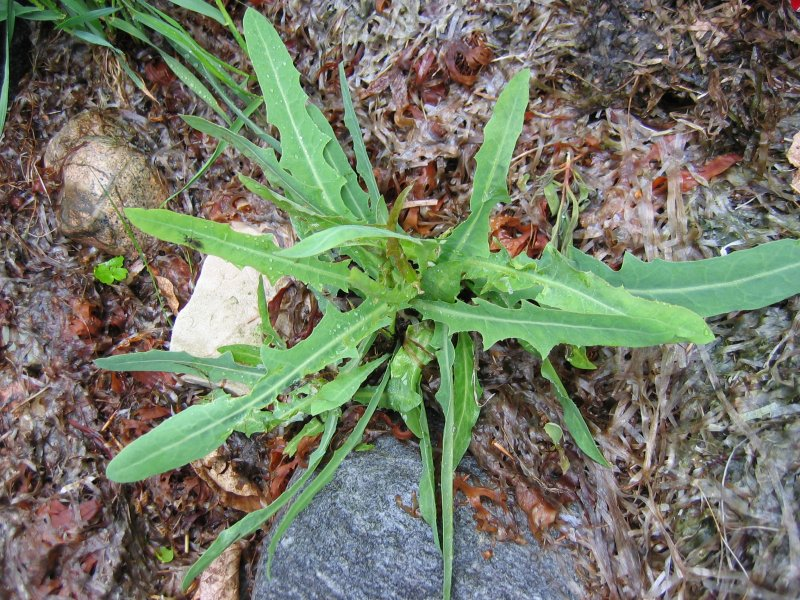
Lactuca tatarica

There are different concepts of the species within Lactuca. As of 2026, more than a hundred species are recognized.

Species include:

- Lactuca acanthifolia (Crete, Turkey)
- Lactuca aculeata (Asia Minor)
- Lactuca acuminata (North America)
- Lactuca alaica (Kyrgyzstan)
- Lactuca alpestris (Crete)
- Lactuca alpina (syn. Cicerbita alpina) (Europe) - alpine sow-thistle, alpine blue-sow-thistle, tall blue lettuce
- Lactuca altaica (Eurasia)
- Lactuca anatolica (Turkey)
- Lactuca attenuata (Africa)
- Lactuca azerbaijanica (Iran)
- Lactuca biennis (North America) – tall blue lettuce, blue wood lettuce
- Lactuca birjandica (Iran)
- Lactuca brachyrrhyncha (Central America)
- Lactuca calophylla (Africa)
- Lactuca canadensis (North America) – Canada wild lettuce, tall lettuce
- Lactuca chitralensis (Afghanistan, Pakistan)
- Lactuca cichorioides (Angola)
- Lactuca corymbosa (Congo)
- Lactuca cubanguensis (Angola)
- Lactuca czerepanovii (Transcaucasus)
- Lactuca denaensis (Iran)
- Lactuca × dichotoma (Balkans)
- Lactuca dissecta (Asia)
- Lactuca dolichophylla (Asia)
- Lactuca dregeana (South Africa) – melkdissel, slaaidissel
- Lactuca dumicola (Angola)
- Lactuca erostrata (Pakistan)
- Lactuca fenzlii (Turkey)
- Lactuca floridana (North America) – Florida lettuce, woodland lettuce
- Lactuca formosana (China, Mongolia, Taiwan)
- Lactuca georgica (Asia)
- Lactuca gilanica (Iran)
- Lactuca glandulifera (Africa)
- Lactuca glareosa (Turkey)
- Lactuca glaucifolia (Asia)
- Lactuca graciliflora (Asia)
- Lactuca gorganica (Iran, Transcaucasus)
- Lactuca gracilipetiolata (Myanmar)
- Lactuca graminifolia (Americas) – grassleaf lettuce
- Lactuca haimanniana (Libya)
- Lactuca hazaranensis (Iran)
- Lactuca hirsuta (North America) – downy lettuce, hairy lettuce
- Lactuca hispida (Balkans, Eastern Europe, Eastern Mediterranean, Asian Levant, Transcaucasus)
- Lactuca hispidula (Turkmenistan)
- Lactuca homblei (Zaire, Zambia)
- Lactuca imbricata (Africa)
- Lactuca indica (Asia) - Indian lettuce
- Lactuca inermis (Africa, Arabian Peninsula)
- Lactuca intricata (Albania, Greece, Turkey)
- Lactuca kanitziana (Borneo)
- Lactuca kemaliya (Turkey)
- Lactuca kirpicznikovii (Transcaucasus)
- Lactuca klossii (Vietnam)
- Lactuca kochiana (Turkey, Transcaucasus)
- Lactuca kossinskyi (Iran, Turkmenistan)
- Lactuca laevigata (Java, Lesser Sunda Islands, New Guinea)
- Lactuca lasiorhiza (Africa)
- Lactuca leucoclada (Afghanistan)
- Lactuca longespicata (Africa)
- Lactuca longidentata (Sardinia)
- Lactuca ludoviciana (North America) – biannual lettuce
- Lactuca macrophylla
- Lactuca malaissei Lawalrée (Democratic Republic of the Congo)
- Lactuca mansuensis Hayata (Taiwan)
- Lactuca marunguensis (Democratic Republic of the Congo)
- Lactuca microsperma (New Guinea)
- Lactuca morssii (North America)
- Lactuca muralis (Europe, Northwestern Africa)
- Lactuca mwinilungensis (Zaire, Zambia)
- Lactuca orientalis (Asia, Egypt)
- Lactuca oblongifolia (North America)
- Lactuca orientalis (Central Asia, South Asia, Middle East, Near East, Egypt)
- Lactuca oyukludaghensis (Turkey)
- Lactuca pakistanica (Pakistan)
- Lactuca palmensis (Canary Islands)
- Lactuca paradoxa (Africa)
- Lactuca perennis (Europe) – blue lettuce, mountain lettuce
- Lactuca petrensis (Angola)
- Lactuca piestocarpa (Iran)
- Lactuca plumieri (Europe)
- Lactuca polyclada (Iran)
- Lactuca praecox (Africa)
- Lactuca praevia (Burkina Faso, Guinea)
- Lactuca pumila (Afghanistan)
- Lactuca quercina (Eurasia)
- Lactuca raddeana (Asia)
- Lactuca rapunculoides (Asia)
- Lactuca reviersii (Morocco)
- Lactuca rostrata (Java)
- Lactuca rosularis (Iran, Turkmenistan)
- Lactuca sagittarioides (Asia)
- Lactuca saligna (Eurasia) – willow lettuce, least lettuce, narrow-leaf lettuce
- Lactuca sativa – lettuce, garden lettuce
- Lactuca scarioloides (western Asia)
- Lactuca schulzeana (Angola, Cameroon, Zaire)
- Lactuca schweinfurthii (Africa)
- Lactuca serriola (Africa, Asia, Europe) – prickly lettuce, compassplant, scarole, milk thistle
- Lactuca setosa (Africa)
- Lactuca sibirica (Eurasia)
- Lactuca singularis (Spain)
- Lactuca songeensis (Democratic Republic of the Congo, Tanzania)
- Lactuca songmaoensis (Taiwan)
- Lactuca spinidens (Tajikistan, Turkmenistan)
- Lactuca stebbinsii (Angola)
- Lactuca stipulata (Rwanda)
- Lactuca takhtadzhianii (Armenia)
- Lactuca tatarica (Northern Hemisphere) – blue lettuce
- Lactuca tenerrima (southern Europe, Morocco)
- Lactuca tetrantha (Cyprus)
- Lactuca tenerrima (France, Spain, Baleares, Morocco)
- Lactuca tetrantha
- Lactuca tinctociliata (Angola)
- Lactuca triangulata (Asia)
- Lactuca tuberosa (Eurasia)
- Lactuca tysonii (South Africa)
- Lactuca ugandensis (Africa)
- Lactuca undulata (Asia)
- Lactuca viminea (Africa, Asia, Europe) – pliant lettuce
- Lactuca virosa (Europe, northern Africa) – bitter lettuce, great lettuce
- Lactuca watsoniana (Azores)
- Lactuca winkleri (Tajikistan)
- Lactuca yemensis (Yemen)
- Lactuca zambeziaca (Africa)

== Ecology ==
Lactuca species are used as food plants by the larvae of many Lepidoptera species.

== Etymology ==
'Lactuca' is derived from Latin and means 'having milky sap'. 'Lactuca' and 'lactic' (of or relating to milk) have the same root word, 'lactis'.
