= Wild lettuce =

Wild lettuce is a common name for several lactucarium-containing plants related to lettuce (Lactuca sativa). The name most often refers to Lactuca virosa (Europe, Asia, introduced to North America), though it may also refer to:

- Lactuca canadensis (North America)
- Lactuca ludoviciana (NW America)
- Lactuca serriola (Southern Europe)
- Lactuca quercina (Eurasia)
- Lactuca floridana (North America)
