= Belonolaimus longicaudatus =

Sting nematode

Scientific classification
- Domain: Eukaryota
- Kingdom: Animalia
- Phylum: Nematoda
- Class: Secernentea
- Order: Tylenchida
- Family: Belonolaimidae
- Genus: Belonolaimus
- Species: B. longicaudatus

Binomial name
- Belonolaimus longicaudatus Rau, (1958 )

Species of roundworm

Belonolaimus longicaudatus (Sting nematode) is a common parasite of grasses and other plant crops and products. It is the most destructive nematode pest of turf grass, and it also attacks a wide range of fruit, vegetable, and fiber crops such as citrus, cotton, ornamentals, and forage. The sting nematode is a migratory ectoparasite of roots. It is well established in many golf courses and presents a problem in turf management. The sting nematode is only present in very sandy soils. It cannot reproduce in heavier or clay soils.

== History ==
The genus was originally described by Steiner in 1942 but because of WWII the work was not published until 1949 (B. gracilis, Steiner 1949). Rau (1958) further refined the anatomical description and clarified the genus to note that there were several species, most common of which is B. longicaudatus.

== Description ==
A long nematode compared to other plant parasitic nematodes at 2–3 mm for both the male and female. Description: The lip region is hemispherical, divided bilateral, dorsal, and ventral with grooves into four main lobes (two subdorsal and two subventral) each bearing six or more horizontal striations; two smaller lobes (lateral) with amphid apertures. The lip region is generally set off from the body by deep constriction, but this may be less marked in some populations. The lateral field is marked by a single incisure extending from the base of the lip region to near the tail terminus. The stylet is 100-140 micrometers long; it is very thin and flexible with rounded knobs. The excretory pore is posterior to median bulb. The esophageal gland is lobe-like and extends anteriorly over the intestine. The tail is 115-189 micrometers long with a rounded terminus.

Males: Outline of lip region is more flattened at the sides than in females but arrangement of lobes is similar. The testis is outstretched. Spicules are arcuate with ventral flanges and the distal ends pointed with small apical notches. The gubernaculum is well developed and there is a bursa enveloping the tail.

Female: The vulva is a transverse slit and the vulval lips do not protrude into the vagina which generally has an opposing pair of sclerotized pieces in the lateral view. There are two ovaries which are amphidelphic and outstretched. There is also a spermatheca present.

== Distribution and economic importance ==
Sting nematodes are endemic to the southeastern United States and are only capable of reproducing in sandy soils. This fact is the primary limiting factor in this nematodes distribution. The nematode has been reported in all the southeastern gulf states and additionally in Kansas, Oklahoma, New Jersey, Connecticut and Arkansas (Robbins and Barker, 1974). More recently it has been reported as a pest in Californian golf courses due to the transport of infested root stock. It is a major pest of golf courses (Luc et al. 2010) strawberries (Noling 2012) cotton (Crow et al. 2005), corn (Perry and Rhodes, 1982) and citrus (Duncan et al. 1996). The large size of the nematode paired with its ability to repeatedly feed from site to site on the root system of many crops makes this a formidable pest. Reduction of yield and substantial reduction in plant size have been reported for multiple crops.

== Reproduction and life cycle ==
The life cycle is around 24–28 days with optimum temperature being 25–30 °C (77–86 °F) (Huang and Becker, 1999; Robbins and Barker, 1974). The nematode survives extremes in temperature or drought by moving deeper into the soil (Robbins and Barker, 1974). All vermiform life stages feed on roots and feeding is required to mate and reproduce. Females must be fertilized by a male for viable eggs to be produced (Huang and Becker, 1999).

== Host-parasite relationship ==
The nematode feeds as an ectoparasite, most often at the site of cell division and elongation of the root (Huang and Becker, 1997). The long stylet allows the nematode to feed on the inner cortex and endodermis. The feeding at root tips causes root abbreviation and stunting (Crow and Han, 2005). In corn roots swelling at root tips may occur due to repeated attempts by the plant to produce new root branches. In cotton the feeding may cause lesions which eventually cause root girdling.

== Management ==
Historically, methyl bromide has been the chemical most often used to control sting nematodes however its scheduled removal from the market on January 1, 2015 (Rosskoph et al. 2005) has led to testing of new chemicals and biopesticides. Endospores of Pasteuria sp. have been tested on turf grass with mixed success (Luc et al. 2010). The extensive use of various chemicals in the strawberry and turf grass industries offers insight into the future of chemical control of nematodes which will surely involve a multifaceted approach. The leading candidate for most control is Telone (Noling 2012). Crop rotation is generally viewed as economically prohibitive due to the pests' wide host range.

== Host list ==
Host list from: Noling, J.W. (2012) "Nematode management in strawberries". Entomology and Nematology Department, Florida Cooperative Extension Service, Institute of Food and Agricultural Sciences, University of Florida.

* indicates a variable host response to geographic/physiologic races of sting nematode.

=== Turf, field and forage crops ===
Bluegrass, bentgrass, centipedegrass, St. Augustine grass, bahiagrass, Bermuda grass, pangola grass, fescue, corn, oats, millet, rye, wheat, peanut*, clovers, cotton, soybean, barley, Lespedeza.

=== Fruit and vegetable crops ===
Beans, carrots, celery, sweet corn, cowpea, eggplant, onion*, pea, citrus*, strawberry*, cabbage*, cantaloupe, cauliflower, endive, lettuce, tomato, turnip, okra*, cucumber*, snap bean, squash, pepper, sweet potato*, potato.

=== Cover crops ===
Sesbania, sorghum/Sudan grass, iron clay pea, mung bean, pigeon pea, hairy vetch, joint vetch.

Use of poor or non-host cover crops within the rotation sequence may in some cases offer an effective approach to nematode control. Four leguminous cover crops adaptable for managing soil populations of sting or root-knot nematode include Iron Clay cowpea (Vigna unguiculata cv. 'Iron Clay'), sunn hemp (Crotalaria juncea), hairy indigo (Indigofena hirsuta) and American joint vetch (Aeschynomene americana). Sorghum is also a popular cover crop restoring large amounts of soil organic matter, but is a good host for sting nematode but not root-knot. Most of the small grains commonly used as winter cover crops in central and north Florida, such as rye, barley, wheat, or oats, can support limited reproduction of root-knot nematodes.

=== Common weeds ===
Crabgrass, Bermuda grass, fescues, lambsquarter*, cudweed, dog fennel, Johnson grass, beggarweed, ragweed, wild carrot, Spanish needle.

=== Poor hosts ===
Tobacco, watermelon*, asparagus, hot pepper, sunn hemp, hairy indigo, Crotalaria, velvet bean*, Bidens, horseweed, buckhorn plantain, pokeweed, sandbur, cocklebur*, jimson weed, sorrel, wild garlic, Jerusalem oak.
