= Opium lettuce =

Opium lettuce refers to several plants in the lettuce genus (Lactuca) producing a lactucarium that has been used as a sedative and analgesic:

- Lactuca virosa (most commonly)
- Lactuca serriola (most widespread in North America)
