= Tall lettuce =

Tall lettuce is a common name for several plants related to lettuce (Lactuca sativa) and may refer to:

- Lactuca virosa, native to Europe and Asia, introduced to North America
- Lactuca canadensis, native to North America
