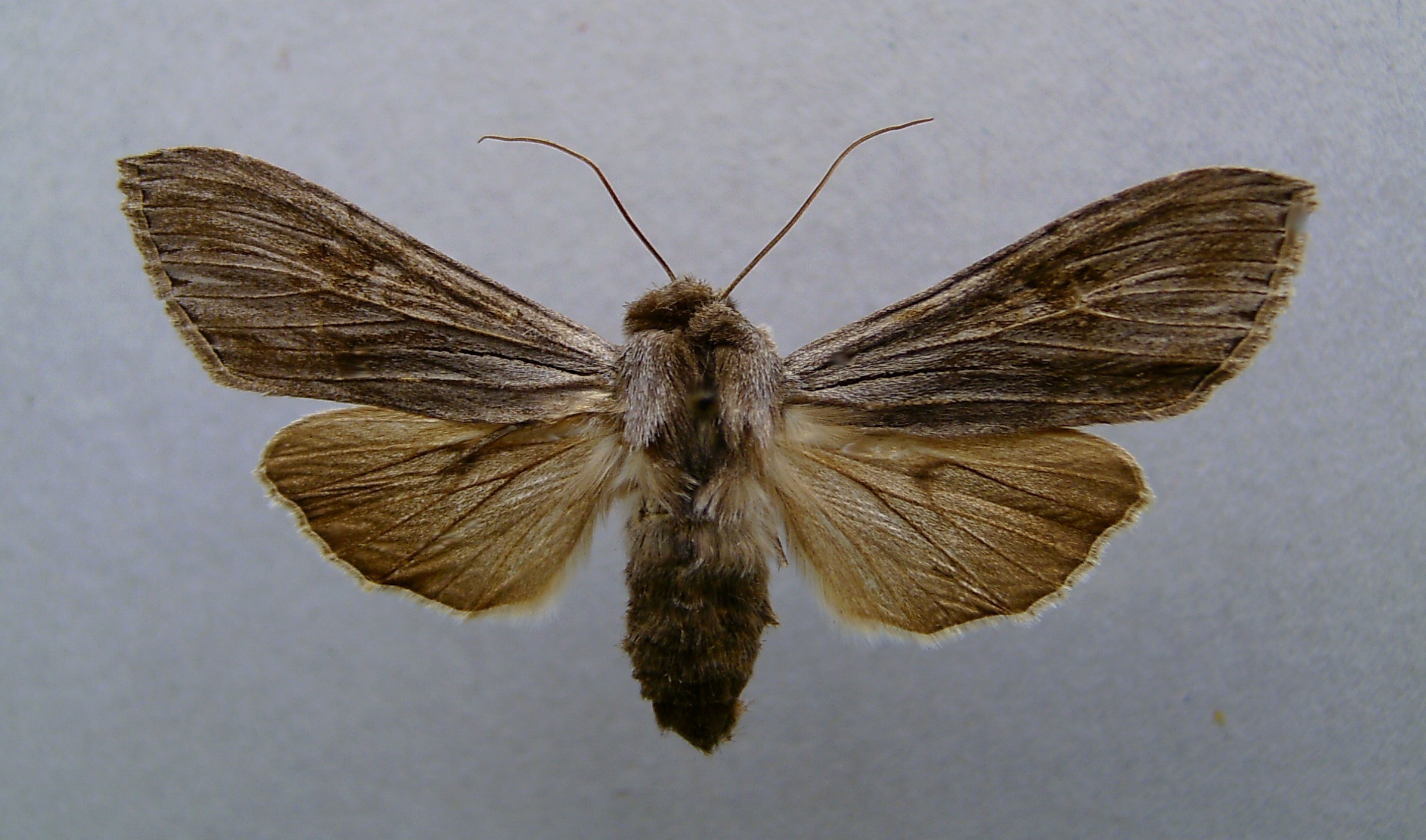

Scientific classification
- Domain: Eukaryota
- Kingdom: Animalia
- Phylum: Arthropoda
- Class: Insecta
- Order: Lepidoptera
- Superfamily: Noctuoidea
- Family: Noctuidae
- Genus: Cucullia
- Species: C. lactucae

Binomial name
- Cucullia lactucae (Denis & Schiffermüller, 1775)

Synonyms
- Noctua lactucae

= Cucullia lactucae =

Lettuce shark

Species of moth

Cucullia lactucae, the lettuce shark, is a moth of the family Noctuidae. The species was first described by Michael Denis and Ignaz Schiffermüller in 1775. It is found in most of Europe, Turkey, the Caucasus and east across the Palearctic to the Altai Mountains (in the east records may be misidentifications of Cucullia fraterna Butler, 1878). In the Alps it rises to 1,800 metres (5,900 ft). It is found mainly in barren places, on weeds and debris and scree corridors on slopes, shrubby edges and in vineyards, gardens and parks.

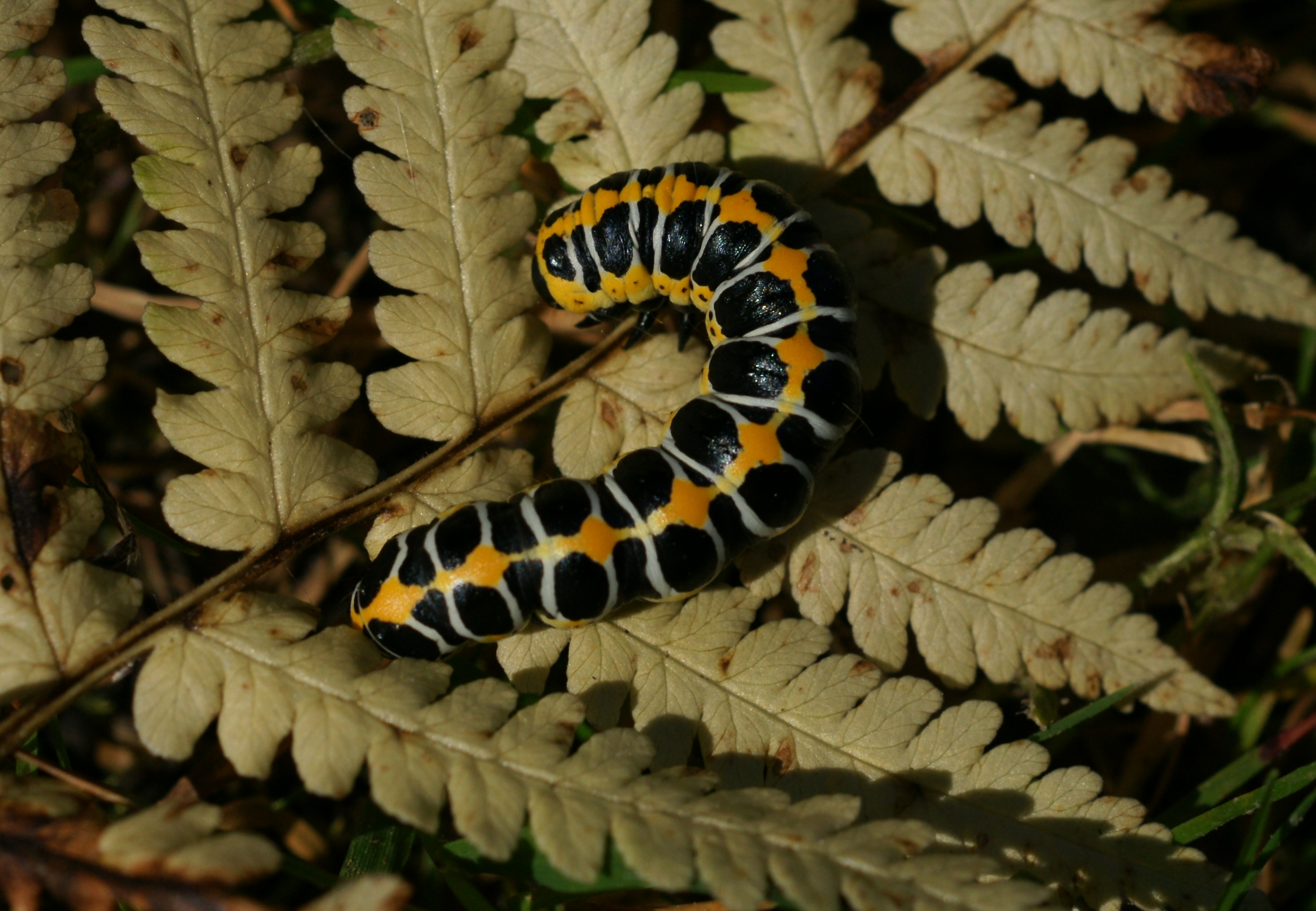
Caterpillar (orange form)

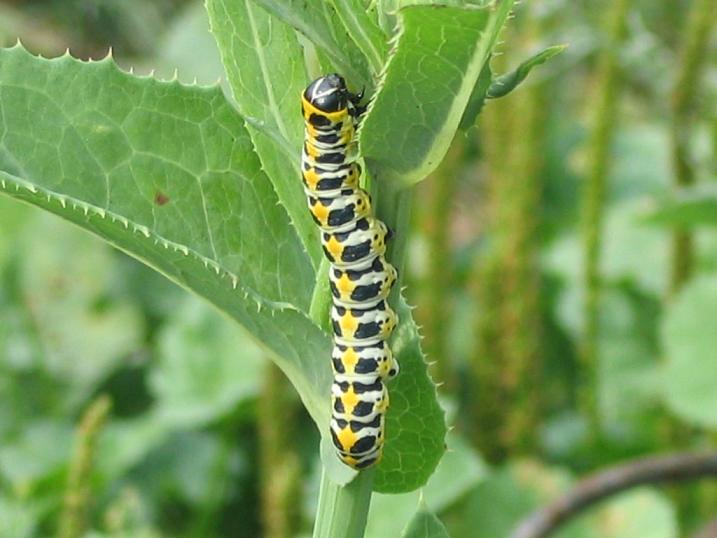
Caterpillar (yellow form)

== Technical description and variation ==
C. lactucae Schiff. (= pustulata Ev., campanulae H. Sch. nec Frr.) (27 a). Forewing dark grey, the lines and shadings still darker; the inner and outer lines and a median shade from costa fairly distinct; a black streak from base along submedian fold; a black streak above vein 4 and a shorter one below vein 2 before termen; hindwing brownish fuscous with paler base, especially in the male. Larva white; dorsal line yellow, broadened ont into a blotch on each segment, with a row of large round black spots on each side of it, between which before the segmental incisions stands a row of black oblong vertical spots; above the feet a row of yellow spots marked on both sides with black flecks; spiracles black; head black with a white angular marking. The wingspan is 44–53 mm.

== Biology ==
Adults are on wing from May to July in one generation in most of the range. In the south, there is a second generation with adults on wing from August to September.

The larvae feed on Asteraceae species, Sonchus arvensis, Sonchus asper, Lactuca sativa and Lactuca muralis.
