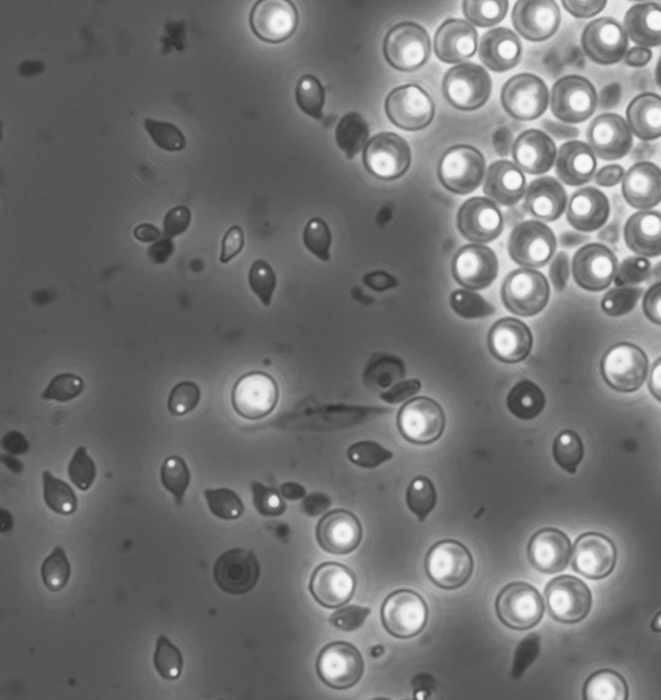
- Pasteuria ramosa spores

Scientific classification
- Domain: Bacteria
- Kingdom: Bacillati
- Phylum: Bacillota
- Class: Bacilli
- Order: Caryophanales
- Family: Pasteuriaceae; Laurent 1890

Genus
- Pasteuria

Synonyms
- "Pasteurieae" Trevisan 1889

= Pasteuriaceae =

Family of bacteria

Pasteuriaceae is a family of nonmotile Gram-positive bacteria. They are moderately to strongly resistant to heat. Species in this family produce a septate mycelium with one refractile endospore. The mycelium grows bigger on one end to form sporangia and sometimes endospores. The size of the endospores is different for each species of the genus Pasteuria. Species of the family of Pastueriaceae are endoparasitic in plant, soil, and freshwater invertebrates.

== Parasitism ==
Bacteria of the Pasteuriaceae family are endoparasitic within nematodes or cladoceran hosts. After the infection, the host gets castrated by the parasite and shows gigantism. The infection pathway is not fully discovered yet. The core of the endospores is covered by glycoproteins that are presumed to be involved in the attachment of the endospores to the invertebrates host.

== List of species of the genus Pasteuria ==
Sources:

1. Pasteuria ramosa (Metchinokoff 1888) obligate endoparasite of water fleas of the genera Daphnia and Moina.
2. Pasteuria nishizawae (Sayre, Wergin, Schmidt and Starr 1992) obligate endoparasite of the pseudocoelom of Heterodera glycines.
3. Pasteuria penetrans (Sayre and Starr 1986) parasites in the pseudocoelomic cavities of Meloidogyne spp.
4. Pasteuria thornei (Starr and Sayre 1988) parasite of Pratylenchus.
5. "Candidatus Pasteuria usgae" (Giblin-Davis, Williams, Bekal, Dickson, Brito, Becker and Preston 2003) obligate endoparasite of the pseudocoelom of Belonolaimus longicaudatus.

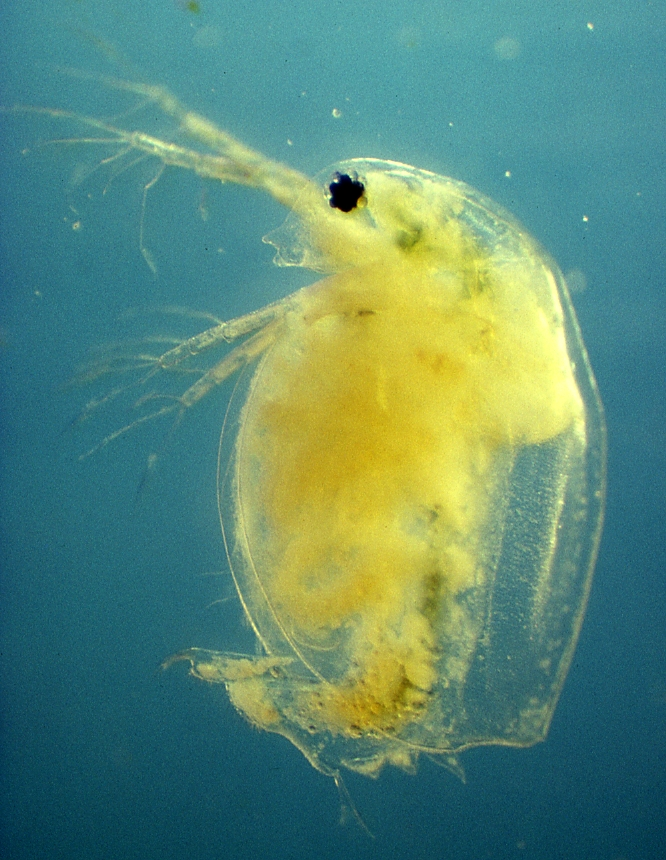
Daphnia magna infected with the bacterium Pasteuria ramosa.
