= Pasteuria nishizawae =

Scientific classification
- Domain: Bacteria
- Kingdom: Bacillati
- Phylum: Bacillota
- Class: Bacilli
- Order: Bacillales
- Family: Pasteuriaceae
- Genus: Pasteuria
- Species: P. nishizawae

Binomial name
- Pasteuria nishizawae Sayre et al. 1992

Species of bacterium

Pasteuria nishizawae is a mycelial and endospore-forming bacterium parasitic on cyst nematodes of genera Heterodera and Globodera.
