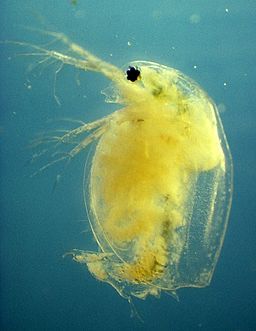
- Daphnia magna infected with Pasteuria ramosa

Scientific classification
- Domain: Bacteria
- Kingdom: Bacillati
- Phylum: Bacillota
- Class: Bacilli
- Order: Caryophanales
- Family: Pasteuriaceae
- Genus: Pasteuria
- Species: P. ramosa

Binomial name
- Pasteuria ramosa Metchnikoff, 1888

= Pasteuria ramosa =

Species of bacterium

Pasteuria ramosa is a gram-positive, endospore-forming bacterium in the Bacillus/Clostridia clade within Bacillota. It is an obligate pathogen of cladoceran crustaceans from the genus Daphnia. Daphnia is a genus of small planktonic crustaceans including D. magna, P. ramosa's most popular host target. Other hosts include D. pulex, D. longispina, D. dentifera, and Moina rectirostris. An established and widely used coevolutionary model of host-pathogen interactions exists with P. ramosa and D. magna.

== Growth and sporulation ==
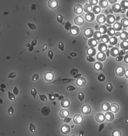
Endospores of P. ramosa

P. ramosa is an obligate pathogen and it can only grow inside its host. Transmission between hosts takes place through the endospore stage, and is strictly horizontal. These endospores are highly resistant to different environmental stresses, including freezing temperatures, and can remain in the environment for decades without any deleterious effects. The infection can be explained in 5 steps: (1.) Encounter (2.) Activation (3.) Attachment (4.) Proliferation and (5.) Termination. The process starts when a Daphnia has ingested a spore of P. ramosa during filter feeding. The spore receives a signal to begin germination, and attaches to the host esophagus. The pathogen then enters the body cavity of the host by penetrating the esophagus wall. Once inside the body cavity, the bacterium begins to propagate in cauliflower like colonies. Propagation of spores is usually observed in the haemocoel and musculature. After the infection has spread throughout the host, the bacterium begins to sporulate. The spores are shed into the environment from the dead host and can remain in the sediment for decades while maintaining their infectivity. Additionally, these spores may be ingested by their immune hosts and pass through the gut of the Daphnia unharmed by any immune cells. This makes the spores very difficult to kill.

== Pathogenicity ==
The infection success of P. ramosa depends on its ability to attach to the host esophagus and to spread into its body cavity where the propagation of the pathogen takes place. Propagation of the spores take place over a period of 10-20 days and ultimately leads to death of the infected host and the release of millions of created spores into the surrounding area. The attachment step of the infection depends on the genotypes of the host and the bacterium, meaning that only certain host genotypes can be infected by certain strains of the bacterium. Although the process through which the genotypic interactions occur is unclear, environmental factors, such as temperature, play a large role in the castration of Daphnia. Studies have shown that female Daphnia are sterilized at warmer temperatures (20–25 °C (68–77 °F)), but still have the ability to reproduce at lower temperatures (10–15 °C (50–59 °F)). This difference in temperatures can be observed in different seasons and can lead to a high amount of variability between Daphnia, a crucial part of its ability to coevolve with P. ramosa. During P. ramosa infection, the size of the Daphnia increases significantly. This phenomenon is known as pathogen-induced gigantism. In addition, the lifespan of the host is significantly reduced. P. ramosa are killed by the ultraviolet radiation in sunlight with local adaptation occurring such that those in clearer lakes produce fewer spores but ones that are more infective.

== Coevolutionary model with Daphnia magna ==
P. ramosa has coevolved with its host Daphnia magna. The mode of coevolution in this system fits the model with negative frequency-dependent selection where the rare genotype is favored since the more common host genotype is more likely to become the target of a specialized pathogen.

== Taxonomy ==
A culture established by James T. Staley, ATCC 27377^{T}, was previously considered to be the neotype for this species, but has been reassigned to Pirellula staleyi Schlesner and Hirsch, 1987 because it did not conform to Metchnikoff's original description of Pasteuria ramosa.
