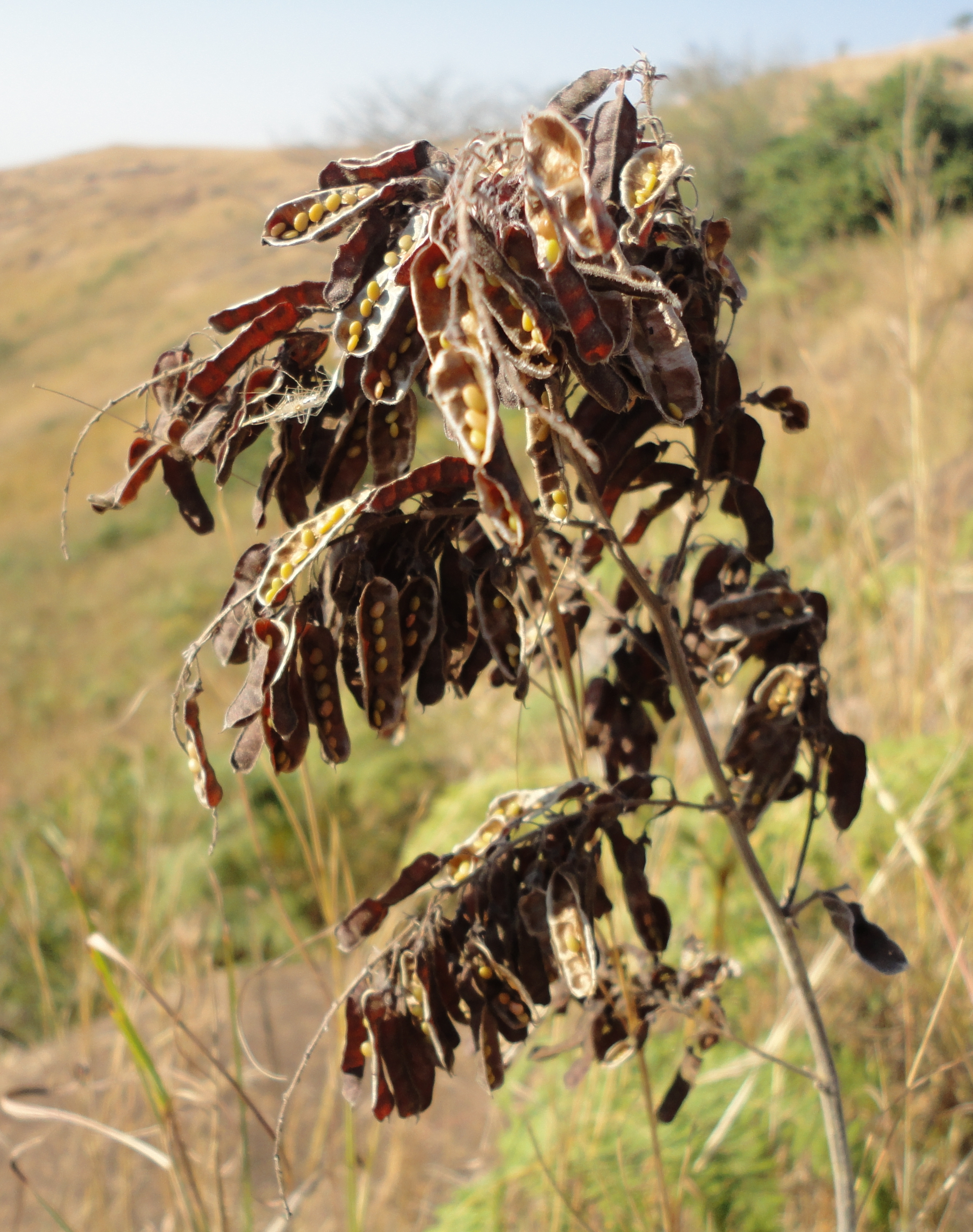
- Seedpods of Pseudarthria hookeri in South Africa

Scientific classification
- Kingdom: Plantae
- Clade: Tracheophytes
- Clade: Angiosperms
- Clade: Eudicots
- Clade: Rosids
- Order: Fabales
- Family: Fabaceae
- Subfamily: Faboideae
- Tribe: Desmodieae
- Subtribe: Desmodiinae
- Genus: Pseudarthria; Wight & Arn. (1834)

Type species
- Pseudarthria viscida (L.) Wight & Arn.

Synonyms
- Anarthrosyne E.Mey. (1836)

= Pseudarthria =

Genus of legumes

Pseudarthria is a genus of flowering plants in the legume family, Fabaceae. It includes seven species of herbs, subshrubs, and shrubs native to tropical Africa and Asia. Typical habitats are seasonally-dry tropical forest margins, grassland, and open or disturbed areas. It belongs to subfamily Faboideae.

- Pseudarthria confertiflora (A.Rich.) Baker
- Pseudarthria crenata Hiern
- Pseudarthria fagifolia Baker
- Pseudarthria hookeri Wight & Arn.
- Pseudarthria macrophylla Baker
- Pseudarthria panii R.Zhang bis, T.S.Yi & B.Pan bis
- Pseudarthria viscida (L.) Wight & Arn.
