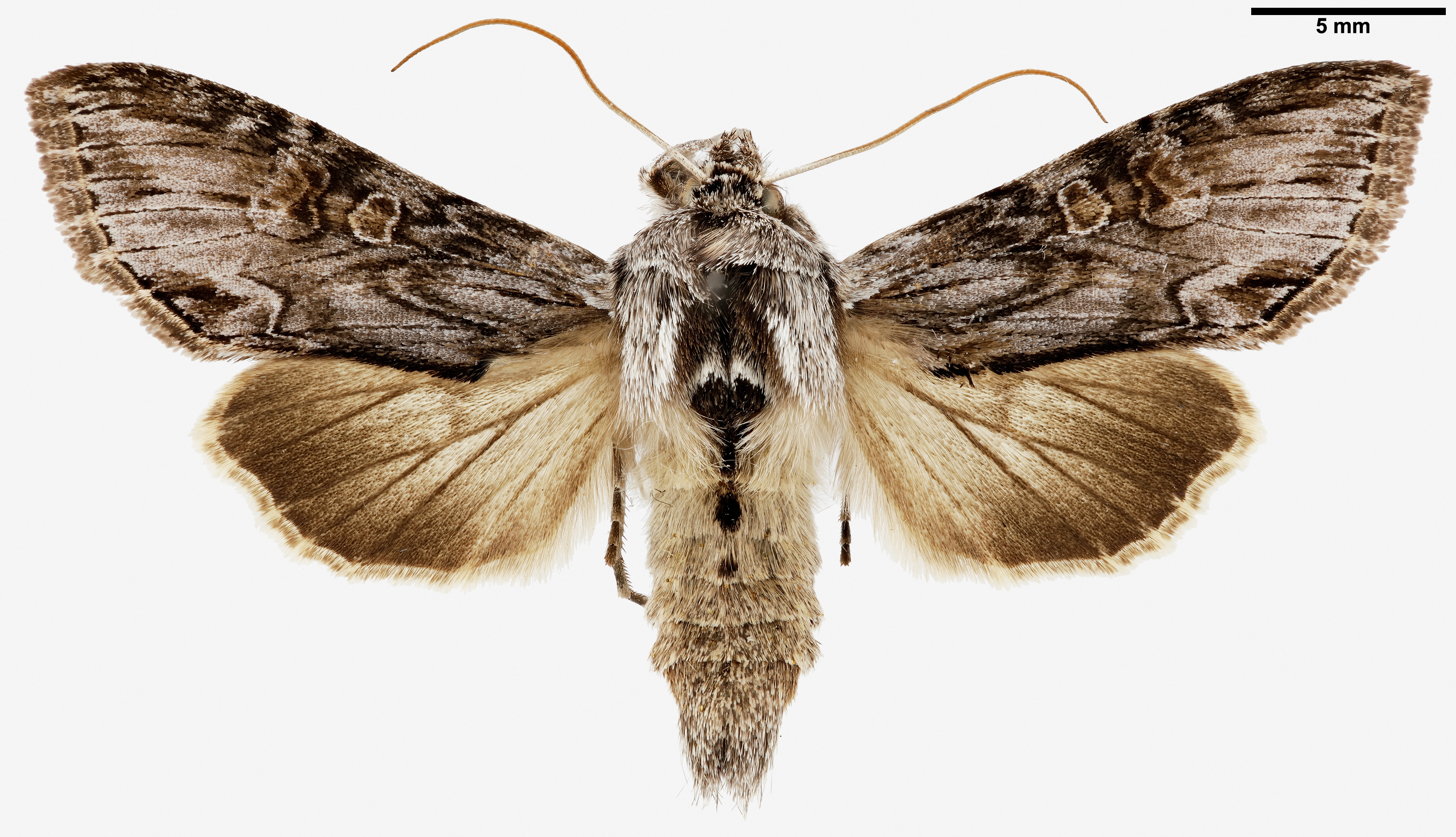

Scientific classification
- Domain: Eukaryota
- Kingdom: Animalia
- Phylum: Arthropoda
- Class: Insecta
- Order: Lepidoptera
- Superfamily: Noctuoidea
- Family: Noctuidae
- Genus: Cucullia
- Species: C. gnaphalii

Binomial name
- Cucullia gnaphalii (Hübner, 1813)

Synonyms
- Noctua gnaphalii Hubner, 1813; Cucullia occidentalis Boursin, 1944

= Cucullia gnaphalii =

Cudweed

Species of moth

Cucullia gnaphalii, the cudweed, is a moth of the family Noctuidae. It is found from most of Europe (except Ireland and most of the Balkan Peninsula) to Turkey, Transcaucasia, Mongolia and Sayan.

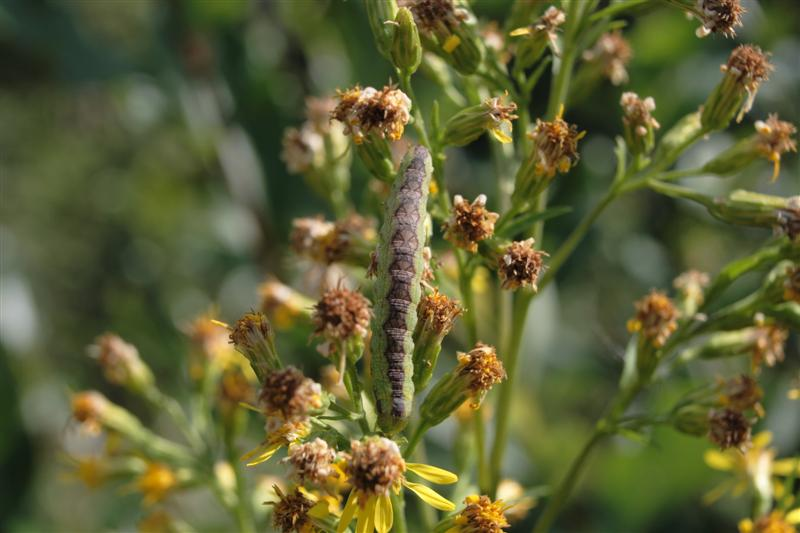
Larva

== Technical description and variation ==
C. gnaphalii Hbn. (27 e). Like Cucullia xeranthemi, from which it is distinguished by the more rounded orbicular, not 8-shaped; by the absence of a black shade before outer line in submedian fold, while the black line beyond it is thickened and more conspicuous; the outer line being bent at right angles on the fold, its lower half vertical; above vein 4 a black streak from the reniform stigma, interrupted in the middle; a black streak along middle of inner margin; hindwing brownish, the basal half paler, but not nearly so pale as in xeranthemi. Larva deep green; dorsal stripe broad, red-brown; spiracles yellow on an interrupted red-brown streak; head green. The wingspan is 38–46 mm.

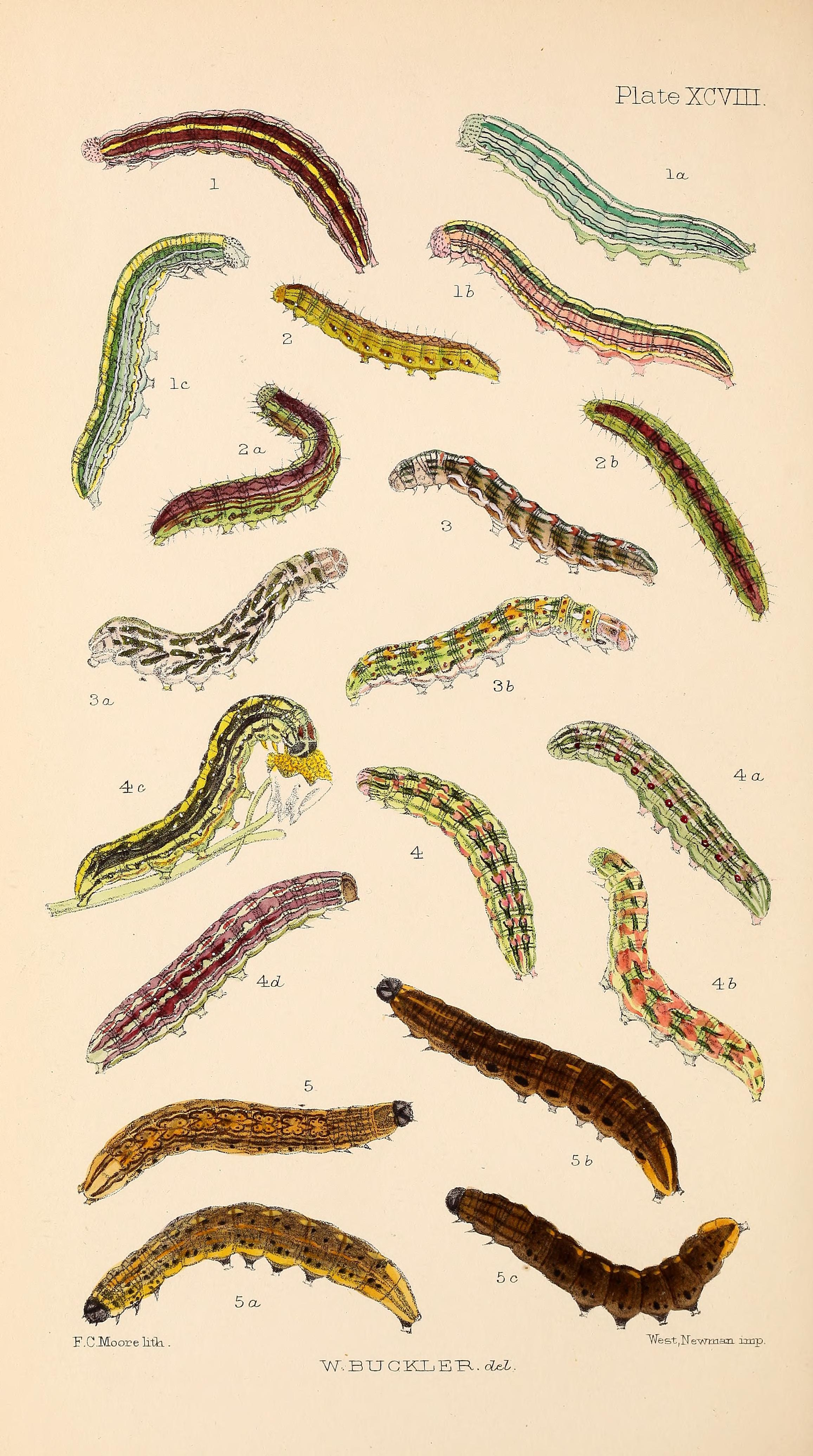
Figs.2, 2a, 2b larvae after last moult

== Biology ==
Adults are on wing from May to July. There is one generation per year.

The larvae feed on the flowers and leaves of Solidago virgaurea, Solidago canadensis, Artemisia absinthium and Artemisia vulgaris hiding by day under the leaves close to the ground.

== See also ==
- Mullein moth
- Shark (moth)
