= Lactucopicrin =

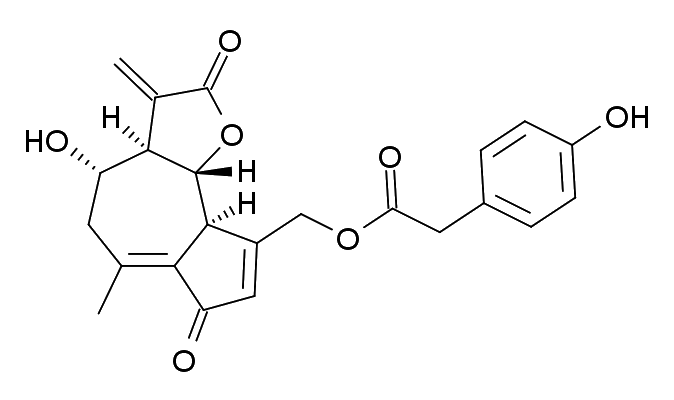
- Stereo wireframe of a chiral lactucopicrin tautomer

Names
- Preferred IUPAC name [(3aR,4S,9aS,9bR)-4-Hydroxy-6-methyl-3-methylidene-2,7-dioxo-2,3,3a,4,5,7,9a,9b-octahydroazuleno[4,5-b]furan-9-yl]methyl (4-hydroxyphenyl)acetate
- Other names Intybin

Identifiers
CAS Number	6466-74-6 (3aR,4S,9bS)
3D model (JSmol)	Interactive image
ChemSpider	152483 (3aR,4S,9bS)
MeSH	Intybin
PubChem CID	174863 (3aR,4S,9bS)
UNII	SKG846KJ3G
CompTox Dashboard (EPA)	DTXSID90983277
- InChI: InChI=1S/C23H22O7/c1-11-7-16(25)20-12(2)23(28)30-22(20)21-14(9-17(26)19(11)21)10-29-18(27)8-13-3-5-15(24)6-4-13/h3-6,9,16,20-22,24-25H,2,7-8,10H2,1H3/t16-,20+,21-,22-/m0/s1 Key: QCDLLIUTDGNCPO-AEMJNJESSA-N; InChI=1/C23H22O7/c1-11-7-16(25)20-12(2)23(28)30-22(20)21-14(9-17(26)19(11)21)10-29-18(27)8-13-3-5-15(24)6-4-13/h3-6,9,16,20-22,24-25H,2,7-8,10H2,1H3/t16-,20+,21-,22-/m0/s1 Key: QCDLLIUTDGNCPO-AEMJNJESBM
- SMILES: CC1=C2[C@@H]([C@@H]3[C@@H]([C@H](C1)O)C(=C)C(=O)O3)C(=CC2=O)COC(=O)Cc4ccc(cc4)O

Properties
Chemical formula	C_{23}H_{22}O_{7}
Molar mass	410.422 g·mol^{−1}

Pharmacology
Routes of administration	Oral, Smoked
- Except where otherwise noted, data are given for materials in their standard state (at 25 °C [77 °F], 100 kPa). Infobox references

Lactucopicrin (Intybin) is a bitter substance that has a sedative and analgesic effect, acting on the central nervous system. It is a sesquiterpene lactone, and is a component of lactucarium, derived from the plant Lactuca virosa (wild lettuce), as well as being found in some related plants such as Cichorium intybus. It is also found in dandelion coffee.

As well as their traditional use as sedatives and analgesics, these plants have also been used as antimalarials, and both lactucin and lactucopicrin have demonstrated antimalarial effects in vitro. Lactucopicrin has also been shown to act as an acetylcholinesterase inhibitor.

== See also ==
- Lactucin
