= Cudweed =

Cudweed is a common name for several species, and may refer to:

== Plants ==
in the family Asteraceae

- Gamochaeta, a plant genus with species in North and South America
- Gnaphalium, a plant genus with species in Eurasia and the Americas
- Filago, a plant genus in Eurasia and North America
- Pseudognaphalium, a plant genus native to North America (e.g. Pseudognaphalium luteoalbum)
- Euchiton, a plant genus native to Australasia and the Pacific
- Helichrysum, a plant genus occurring in Africa, Australasia and Eurasia.

== Animals ==
- Cucullia gnaphalii, a moth in the family Noctuidae
