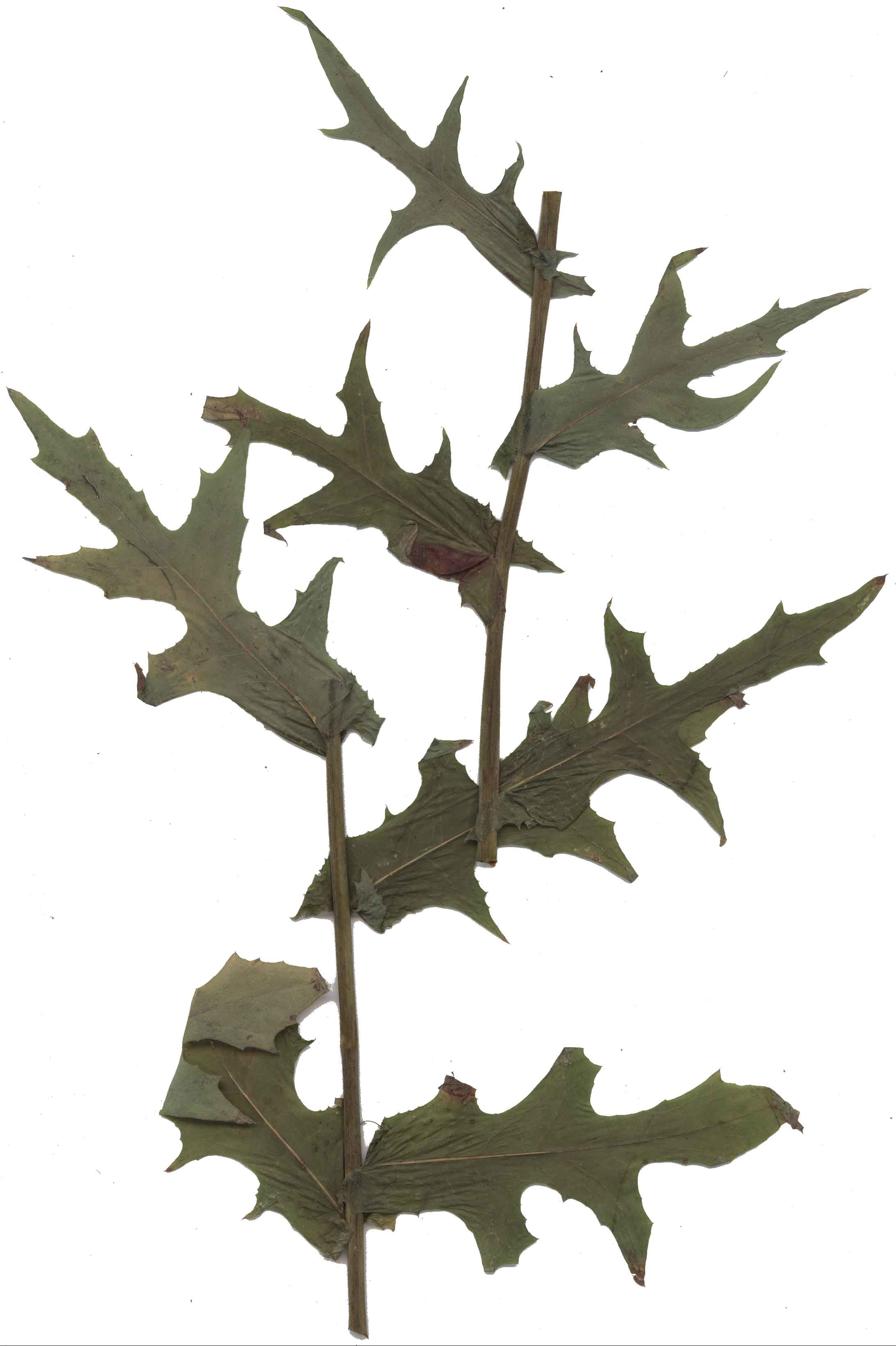
- Lactuca quercina dried specimen
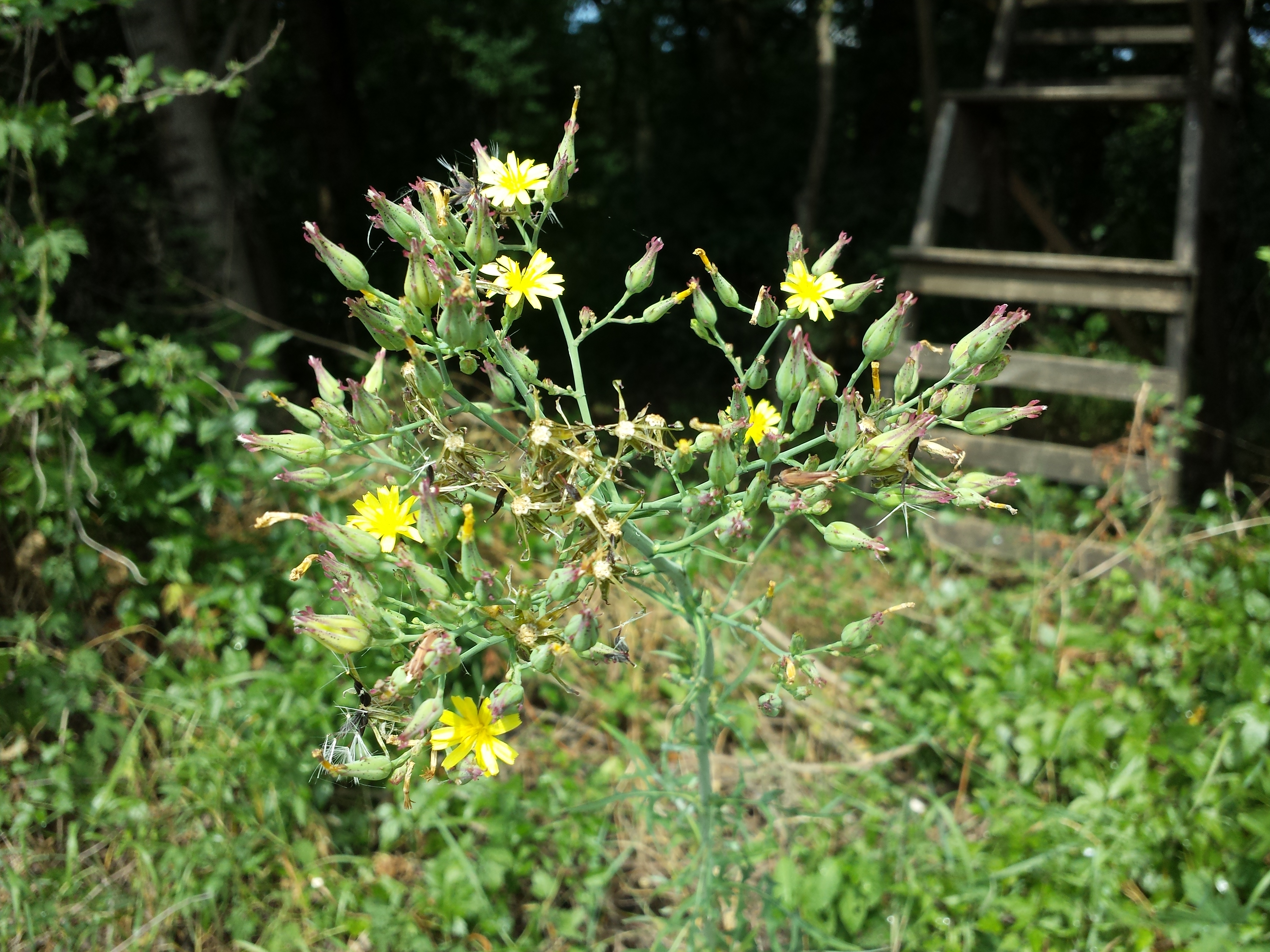
- Inflorescence

Conservation status
- Least Concern (IUCN 3.1)

Scientific classification
- Kingdom: Plantae
- Clade: Tracheophytes
- Clade: Angiosperms
- Clade: Eudicots
- Clade: Asterids
- Order: Asterales
- Family: Asteraceae
- Genus: Lactuca
- Species: L. quercina

Binomial name
- Lactuca quercina L. 1753

Synonyms
- Synonymy: Cicerbita corymbosa Wallr.; Cicerbita quercina (L.) Wallr.; Lactuca altissima M.Bieb.; Lactuca chaixii (Vill.); Lactuca lipskyi Krasch.; Lactuca sagittata Waldst. & Kit.; Lactuca stanekii Domin; Lactuca stricta Waldst. & Kit.; Lactucopsis altissima (M.Bieb.) Vis. & Pančić; Lactucopsis chaixii (Vill.) Vis. & Pančić; Lactucopsis quercina (L.) Vis. & Pančić; Mulgedium quercinum (L.) C.Jeffrey

= Lactuca quercina =

Species of lettuce

Lactuca quercina is a species of wild lettuce native to Europe and Asia. It is an annual or biennial herb in the tribe Cichorieae within the family Asteraceae growing from a taproot to maximum heights of 50–200 cm (19.5–78.5 in) or more.

Lactuca quercina contains lactucarium, which is the milky sap (white latex) that flows through the stem, leaves, and roots of the plant. It is used as a medicinal herb when dried after contact with air. It may be used as medicinal treatments for its anodyne, antispasmodic, digestive, diuretic, hypnotic, narcotic, and sedative properties. Concentrations of lactucarium are low in young plants, but increase in older plants, occurring highest when in blooming period. Sap may be applied to skin in use for treatment of external warts. Although the standard definition of lactucarium requires its production from Lactuca virosa, it was recognized that smaller quantities of lactucarium could be produced in a similar way from Lactuca sativa and Lactuca canadensis var. elongata, and even that lettuce-opium obtained from Lactuca serriola or Lactuca quercina was of superior quality.
