= Horseweed =

Horseweed is a common name for several plants and may refer to:

- Ambrosia trifida
- Cichorium intybus
- Conyza
- Erigeron canadensis, native to North America and Central America
- Lactuca canadensis, native to North America
- Laennecia
