= Velvet bean =

Velvet bean is a common name for several legumes and may refer to:

- Mucuna pruriens and its subspecies Mucuna deeringiana
- Pseudarthria hookeri
