= Pasteuria =

Scientific classification
- Domain: Bacteria
- Kingdom: Bacillati
- Phylum: Bacillota
- Class: Bacilli
- Order: Caryophanales
- Family: Pasteuriaceae
- Genus: Pasteuria; Metchnikoff 1888

Type species
- Pasteuria ramosa Metchnikoff 1888

Species
- "Ca P. aldrichii"; "P. goettingianae"; "P. hartismeri"; P. nishizawae; P. penetrans; P. ramosa; P. thornei; "Ca P. usgae"

Genus of bacteria

Pasteuria is a genus of mycelial and endospore-forming, nonmotile gram-positive bacteria that are obligate parasites of some nematodes and crustaceans. The genus of Pasteuria was previously classified within the family Alicyclobacillaceae, but has since been moved to the family Pasteuriaceae.

== Steps of infection ==
Animals that are susceptible to Pasteuria become infected when they are exposed to endospores in soil or water. Therefore, Pasteuria are transmitted horizontally between hosts and when an infected host dies, it releases spores to the soil or sediment. The likelihood of infections is related to the endospore density in the environment and can be affected by temperature. However, the ability of an endospore to attach to and infect a host is highly specific and following contact with a compatible host, the Pasteuria endospores are activated, penetrate the host's cuticle, proliferate within the host thereby restricting it from reproducing and ultimately the host dies. In water fleas, the ability of the endospore to successfully attach during the infection process is related to the genotype of the host and the parasite. However, in phytonematodes there was no direct relationship between cuticle heterogeneity as exhibited by endospore attachment and the phylogeny of the nematode. Furthermore, in phytonematodes the cues which initiate germination differ between different endospore isolates. For example, in Pasteuria penetrans that infects root-knot nematodes (Meloidogyne spp.) endospore germination usually occurs sometime between the nematode entering the root, setting up the feeding site and the first molt as currently there are no reports of second-stage juveniles (J2) of Meloidogyne spp. containing either developmental stages or endospores of P. penetrans. However, developmental stages and endospores of a field population of Pasteuria have been observed in J2s of Heterodera avenae. An infected root-knot female can contain up to two million endospores, while an infected J2 of H. avenae will contain less than a thousand endospores. Interestingly, endospores that do not infect water fleas and pass through a resistant host can still remain viable and infectious. This suggests that different species or strains of the bacterium have evolved different life-cycle strategies.

== Effects of parasite ==
The life-cycles of the bacteria that infect cladoceran parasites and phytonematodes have been shown to be similar in that during infection they both exhibit morphological stages that are in common with the original description by Metchinkoff. Following infection with Pasteuria, the parasite interferes with the reproduction of their female hosts. Hosts can live with the parasite for a prolonged period of time after infection. In Daphnia, P. ramosa induces gigantism. P. penetrans parasitized females of the nematode Meloidogyne javanica, on the other hand, were smaller than healthy individuals, although there is a direct relationship between the numbers of endospores produced by an individual female and its volume.

== Potential as biocontrol ==
Due to the effect of Pasteuria on reproduction, especially on nematode pests of important crops, there is an interest to develop Pasteuria as a biological control agent. In 2012, Syngenta acquired a company named Pasteuria Bioscience to commercialize Pasteuria as a biological control. In 2013, Syngenta launched CLARIVA™ pn, which has the active ingredient of Pasteuria nishizawae to combat the soybean cyst nematode. The effectiveness of Pasteuria as a biocontrol may depend on the biotypes of the nematode host that are present since they can vary in their susceptibility to Pasteuria.

== Species of Pasteuria and their hosts ==
Currently, four species of Pasteuria and two candidate species are described, all of which are obligate parasites with specific hosts. The described species and their hosts include:

- P. nishizawae Sayre et al. 1992: parasite of cyst-forming nematodes in the genera Heterodera and Globodera.
- P. penetrans Thorne 1940 ex Sayre & Starr 1986: parasite of root knot nematodes in the genus Meloidogyne spp.
- P. ramosa Metchnikoff 1888: parasite of Cladocerans, including Daphnia.
- P. thornei Starr & Sayre 1988: parasite of root-lesion nematodes in the genus Pratylenchus.

Candidate species and their hosts include:

- P. aldrichii Giblin-Davis et al. 2011: parasite of bacterivorous nematodes in the genus Bursilla spp.
- P. usage Giblin-Davis et al. 2003: parasite of the sting nematode, Belonolaimus longicaudatus

Additional species of Pasteuria have been named but are yet to be formally described, including:

- "P. hartismeri" Atibalentja et al. 2002b
- "P. goettingianae" Bishop et al. 2007.
