= Lactucin =

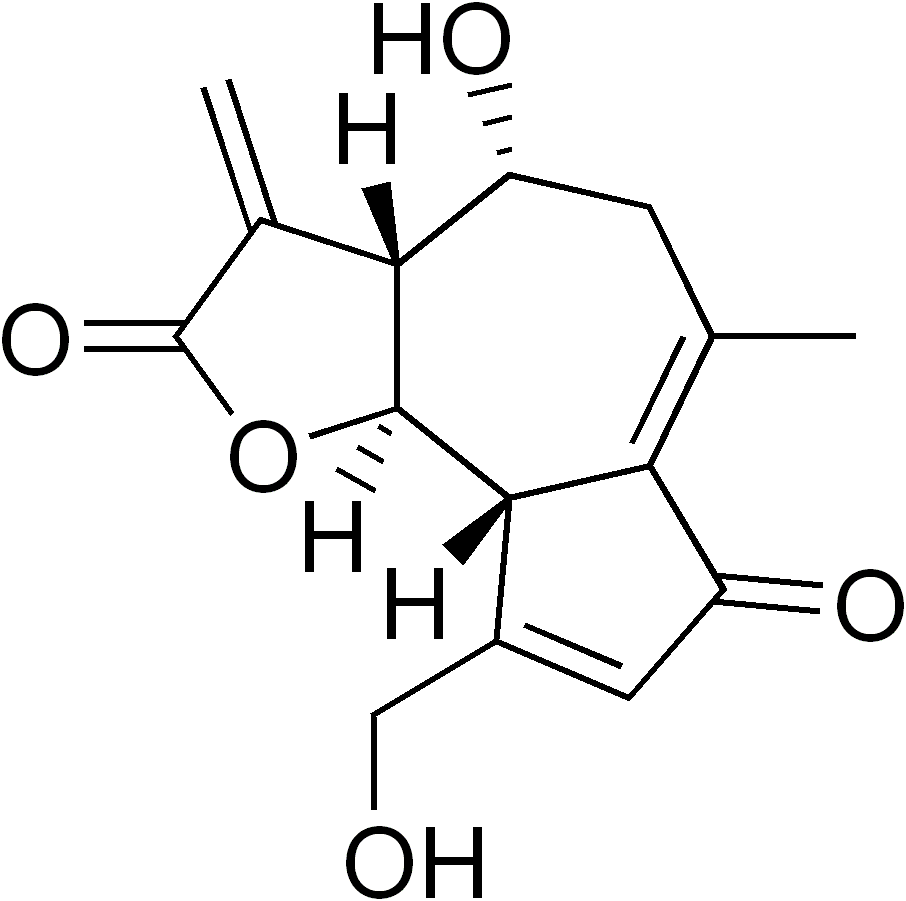

Names
- Preferred IUPAC name (3aR,4S,9aS,9bR)-4-Hydroxy-9-(hydroxymethyl)-6-methyl-3-methylidene-3,3a,4,5,9a,9b-hexahydroazuleno[4,5-b]furan-2,7-dione

Identifiers
CAS Number	1891-29-8
3D model (JSmol)	Interactive image
ChEBI	CHEBI:6358
ChemSpider	717609
ECHA InfoCard	100.440.674
KEGG	C09489
PubChem CID	821383
UNII	R6E2918904
CompTox Dashboard (EPA)	DTXSID70894751
- InChI: InChI=1S/C15H16O5/c1-6-3-9(17)12-7(2)15(19)20-14(12)13-8(5-16)4-10(18)11(6)13/h4,9,12-14,16-17H,2-3,5H2,1H3/t9-,12-,13+,14+/m1/s1 Key: VJQAFLAZRVKAKM-QQUHWDOBSA-N; InChI=1/C15H16O5/c1-6-3-9(17)12-7(2)15(19)20-14(12)13-8(5-16)4-10(18)11(6)13/h4,9,12-14,16-17H,2-3,5H2,1H3/t9-,12-,13+,14+/m1/s1 Key: VJQAFLAZRVKAKM-QQUHWDOBBA
- SMILES: CC1=C2[C@@H]([C@@H]3[C@@H]([C@@H](C1)O)C(=C)C(=O)O3)C(=CC2=O)CO

Properties
Chemical formula	C_{15}H_{16}O_{5}
Molar mass	276.28 g/mol
Appearance	White crystalline solid
- Except where otherwise noted, data are given for materials in their standard state (at 25 °C [77 °F], 100 kPa). verify (what is ?) Infobox references

Lactucin is a bitter substance that forms a white crystalline solid and belongs to the group of sesquiterpene lactones. It is found in some varieties of lettuce and is an ingredient of lactucarium. It is also found in dandelion coffee. It has been shown to have analgesic and sedative properties, which are speculated to occur via modulation of the GABA_{A} receptor, as well as antimalarial activity.

== See also ==
- Lactucopicrin
