= Spanish needles =

Spanish needles or Spanish needle is a common name for several plants and may refer to:

- Bidens species, especially:
  - Bidens alba
  - Bidens bipinnata
  - Bidens pilosa
- Palafoxia arida

The first known use of Spanish needles was in 1743.
