= Dog fennel =

Dog fennel, dog-fennel, or dogfennel is a common name for several plants in the aster or daisy family including:

- Anthemis cotula, an annual plant up to about 60 cm (24 in) tall, native to Europe and North Africa but naturalized in other parts of the world as well
- Chamaemelum, a genus of plants, also known as chamomiles, up to about 30 cm (12 in) tall, native to Europe but naturalized in other parts of the world
- Eupatorium capillifolium, a perennial plant up to about 2 m (6 ft 7 in) tall, native to eastern North America

== See also ==
- Dysodiopsis, false dogfennel
