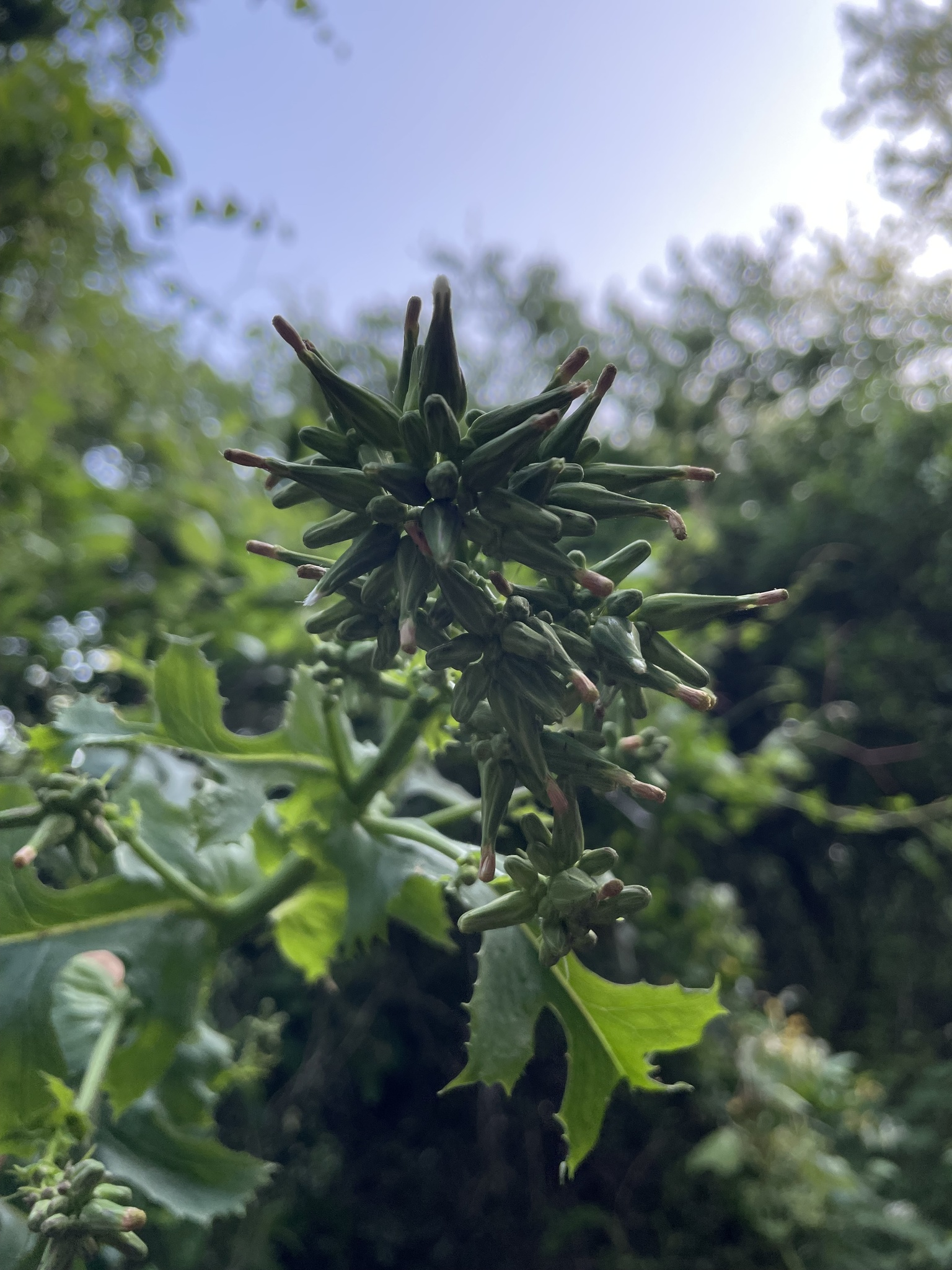
- Lactuca ludoviciana, western lettuce on Galveston Island, TX

Conservation status
- Apparently Secure (NatureServe)

Scientific classification
- Kingdom: Plantae
- Clade: Tracheophytes
- Clade: Angiosperms
- Clade: Eudicots
- Clade: Asterids
- Order: Asterales
- Family: Asteraceae
- Genus: Lactuca
- Species: L. ludoviciana

Binomial name
- Lactuca ludoviciana (Nutt.) Riddell 1835

Synonyms
- Galathenium ludovicianum (Nutt.) Nutt.; Lactuca campestris Greene; Sonchus ludovicianus Nutt. 1818

= Lactuca ludoviciana =

Species of lettuce

Lactuca ludoviciana, the biannual lettuce, is a North American species of wild lettuce. It is widespread across much of central and western Canada and the western and central United States from Ontario west to British Columbia and south to Louisiana, Texas, and California. Most of the known populations are on the Great Plains; populations west of there may well represent naturalizations.

Lactuca ludoviciana is a biennial herb in the dandelion tribe within the daisy family growing from a taproot a height of up to 150 cm (5 feet). The top of the stem bears a multibranched inflorescence with many flower heads. Each head contains 20-50 yellow ray florets but no disc florets.

It has been seen to hybridize wildly with Lactuca canadensis, and it is difficult to differentiate between the two species.
