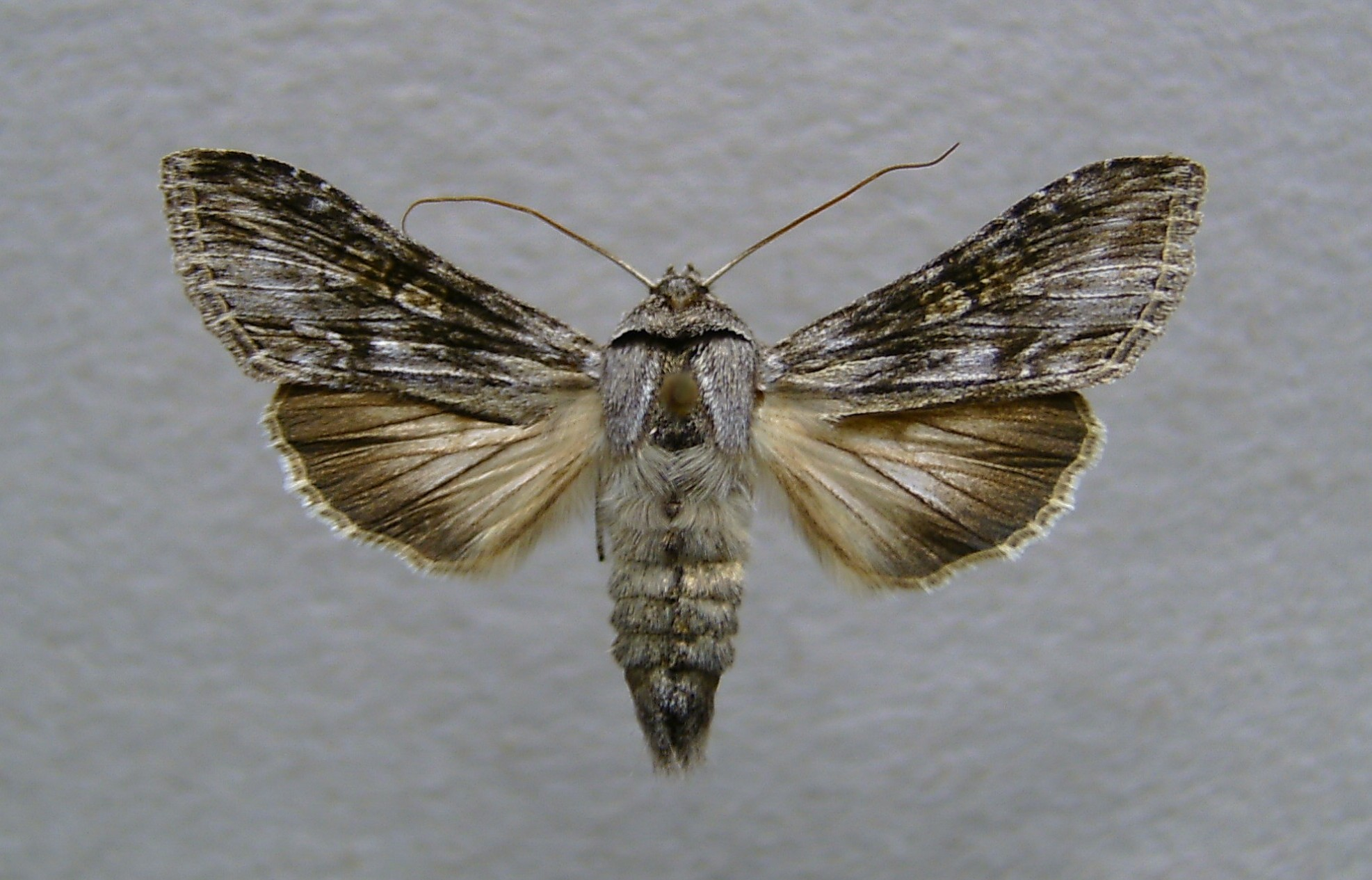

Scientific classification
- Kingdom: Animalia
- Phylum: Arthropoda
- Clade: Pancrustacea
- Class: Insecta
- Order: Lepidoptera
- Superfamily: Noctuoidea
- Family: Noctuidae
- Genus: Cucullia
- Species: C. xeranthemi

Binomial name
- Cucullia xeranthemi Boisduval, 1840

Synonyms
- Cucullia xeranthemi kuennerti (Lederer, 1961); Cucullia xeranthemi atrocaerulea (Tshetverikov, 1925)

= Cucullia xeranthemi =

Species of moth

Cucullia xeranthemi is a species of moth of the family Noctuidae. In southern Europe, it is found locally from northern Spain, Italy and southern France to the Balkans. In the east, it is found from Lower Austria and Hungary to southern Russia and western Siberia.

== Technical description and variation ==
C. xeranthemi Bsd. (27 d). Forewing whitish or bluish grey, with dark fuscous suffusion along the course of the lines, especially at costa; stigmata with pale brown centres and whitish grey annuli, the orbicular 8-shaped, the reniform less defined; inner line double, strongly dentate; outer line variable, sometimes distinct throughout, at others only above inner margin, always preceded on submedian fold by a blackish cloud, and followed by a black streak below vein 2; hindwing dingy whitish, the veins dark, the terminal area smoky black. Larva, when full fed, violet with paler, ill-defined, longitudinal streaks; lateral lines white. The wingspan is 34–42 mm.

== Biology ==
Adults are on wing from May to August in two generations per year. The adults feed on the flower nectar of various flowers, including Silene, Carduus, Cirsium and Scabiosa species.

The larvae feed on Aster linosyris. The larvae can be found in July, August and September . The species overwinters as a pupa.
