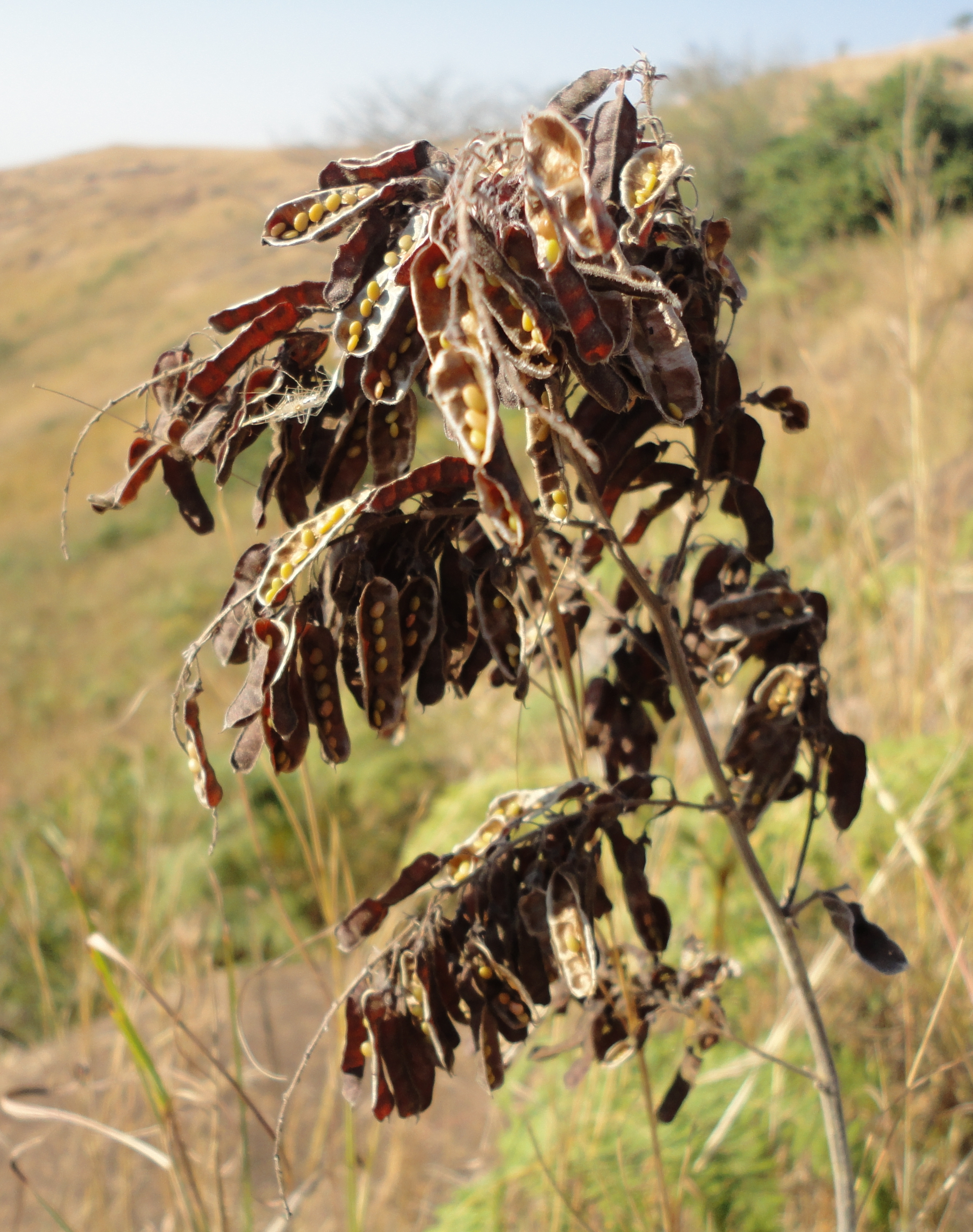
- Pseudarthria hookeri var. hookeri in South Africa
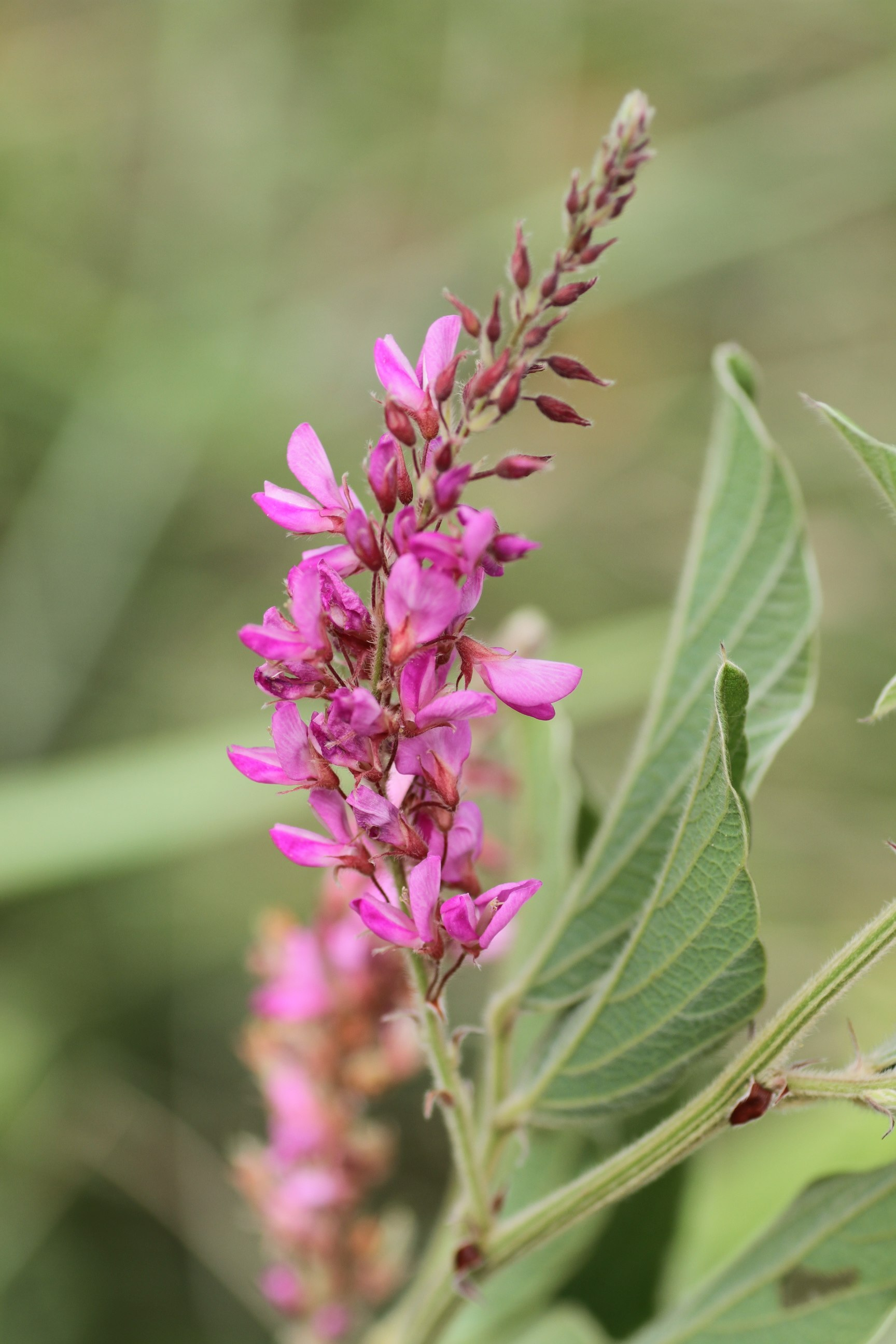

Scientific classification
- Kingdom: Plantae
- Clade: Tracheophytes
- Clade: Angiosperms
- Clade: Eudicots
- Clade: Rosids
- Order: Fabales
- Family: Fabaceae
- Subfamily: Faboideae
- Genus: Pseudarthria
- Species: P. hookeri

Binomial name
- Pseudarthria hookeri Wight & Arn.

= Pseudarthria hookeri =

Species of legume

Pseudarthria hookeri, the pink velvet bean, is a lanky, perennial Afrotropical herb in the legume family, Fabaceae. It is named after William Hooker. It is widespread in the African tropics and moist uplands of the African subtropics, from Senegal and Ethiopia southwards to eastern South Africa. It bears rough trifoliolate leaves along the stem, and produces terminal, pink flowers in late summer. The stem may grow up to 2 or 3 meters in height annually, before it dies back in the dry season.
