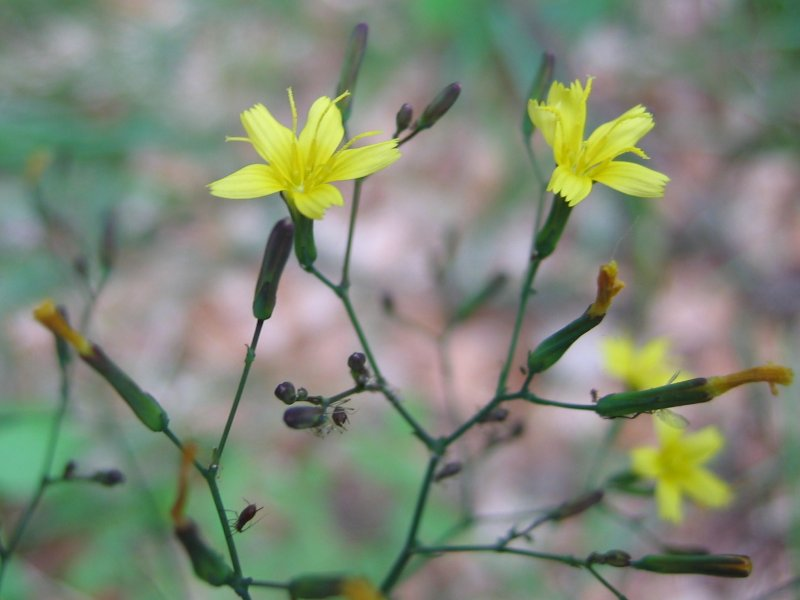

Scientific classification
- Kingdom: Plantae
- Clade: Embryophytes
- Clade: Tracheophytes
- Clade: Spermatophytes
- Clade: Angiosperms
- Clade: Eudicots
- Clade: Asterids
- Order: Asterales
- Family: Asteraceae
- Genus: Lactuca
- Species: L. muralis

Binomial name
- Lactuca muralis (L.) Gaertn. 1791 not Fresen. 1832

Synonyms
- List: Chondrilla erysimifolia Poir.; Chondrilla muralis (L.) Lam.; Chondrilla ruderalis Gaertn. ex Steud.; Cicerbita muralis (L.) Wallr.; Cicerbita muralis subsp. gaditana Mejías; Hieracium mycelis E.H.L.Krause; Hieracium pauciflorum Bernh.; Lactuca atlantica Pomel; Lactuca erysimifolia DC.; Lapsana erysimifolia Thell.; Mycelis angulosa Cass.; Mycelis muralis (L.) Dumort.; Mycelis muralis f. integrifolia (Beckh.) Soó; Phaenixopus muralis (L.) W.D.J.Koch; Prenanthes muralis L.; Prenanthes erysimifolia Willd.; Prenanthes multiflosculosa Nees; Prenanthes parviflora Gilib.; Prenanthes vulgaris Gueldenst.

= Lactuca muralis =

Species of flowering plant in the daisy family

Lactuca muralis, the wall lettuce, is a perennial flowering plant in the tribe Cichorieae within the family Asteraceae. It is also referred to as Mycelis muralis.

Its chief characteristic is its open airy clumps of yellow flowers. Each "flower" is actually a composite flower, consisting of 4–5 petal-like flowers (strap or ray flowers), each approximately 5–7 mm (0.20–0.28 in) in length. There are no disc flowers. Lactuca muralis grows about 2–4 feet (0.6–1.2 m) tall with the lower leaves pinnately toothed and clasping.

== Description ==
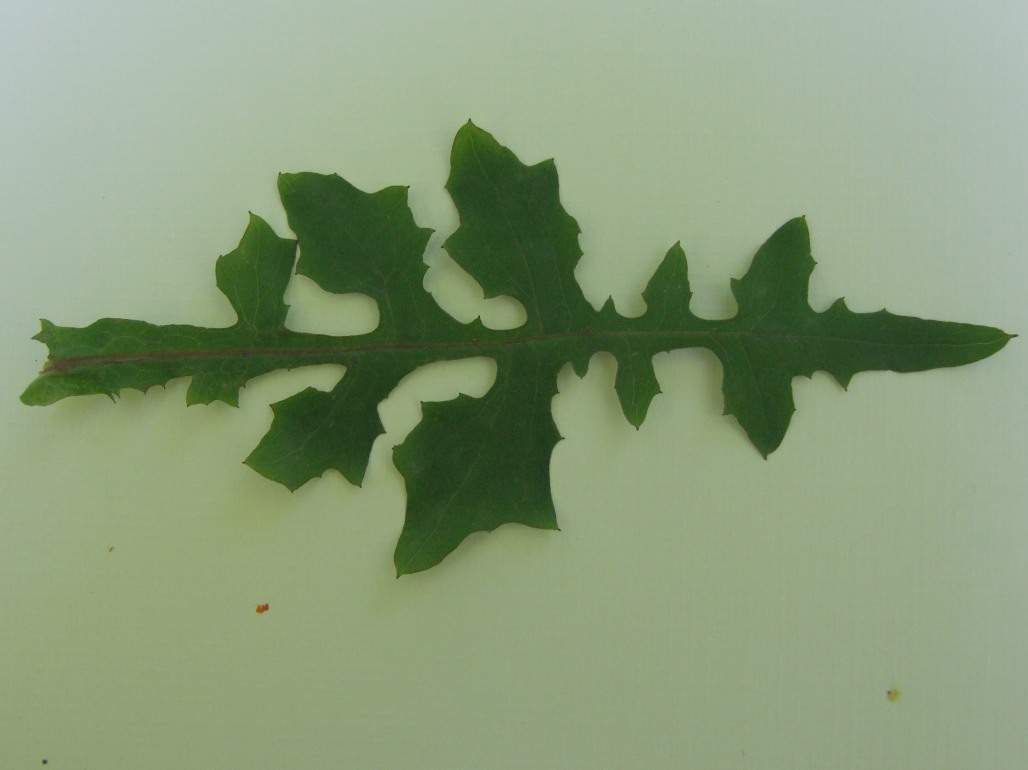

Lactuca muralis is slender, hairless herb growing from 25 to 150 cm (10 to 59 in) tall. It often has purplish stems, and exudes a milky juice.

The lower leaves are lyre shaped, pinnate shaped. The lobes are triangular in shape, the terminal lobe being the largest. The upper leaves are stalkless, smaller and less lobed. All leaves are red tinged.

The achenes are short beaked, spindle shaped and black. The pappus has simple white hairs, the inner longer than the outer.

The flower heads are yellow, small with only 4–5 yellow ray florets. 1 cm (1/2 in) wide more or less, on branches 90 degrees to the main stem, in loose panicle. It flowers from June until September.

Lactuca muralis is similar to Lactuca serriola L. and Lactuca virosa L. but clearly distinguished by having only 5 florets.

== Taxonomy ==
The specific Latin epithet muralis is interpreted as 'growing on walls'.

== Distribution and ecology ==
Lactuca muralis is a native of Europe but has invaded shady roadsides, paths and logged areas of the Pacific Northwest and New England It has become naturalized in parts of Northern Ireland as long ago as 1913. It was first recorded in The Burren, where it is now frequent, in 1939.

It can be found in woodlands, especially beech. It is also found in calcareous soils, and walls.
