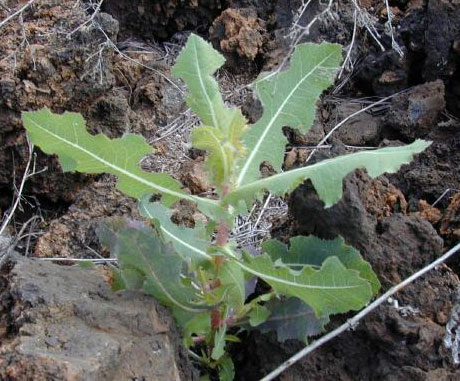

Scientific classification
- Kingdom: Plantae
- Clade: Tracheophytes
- Clade: Angiosperms
- Clade: Eudicots
- Clade: Asterids
- Order: Asterales
- Family: Asteraceae
- Genus: Lactuca
- Species: L. serriola

Binomial name
- Lactuca serriola L.

Synonyms
- Synonymy: Lactuca altaica Fisch. & C.A.Mey.; Lactuca augustana All.; Lactuca coriacea Sch.Bip.; Lactuca dubia Jord.; Lactuca integrata (Gren. & Godr.) A.Nelson; Lactuca latifolia Boiss.; Lactuca latifolia Gilib.; Lactuca scariola L.; Lactuca sylvestris Lam.; Lactuca tephrocarpa K.Koch; Lactuca verticalis Gaterau

= Lactuca serriola =

Species of flowering plant in the daisy family

Lactuca serriola, also called prickly lettuce, milk thistle (not to be confused with Silybum marianum, also called milk thistle), compass plant, and scarole, is an annual or biennial plant in the tribe Cichorieae within the family Asteraceae. It has a slightly fetid odor and is commonly considered a weed of orchards, roadsides and field crops. It is the closest wild relative of cultivated lettuce (Lactuca sativa L.).

Lactuca serriola is native to Eurasia and North Africa, and has become naturalized elsewhere.

== Description ==
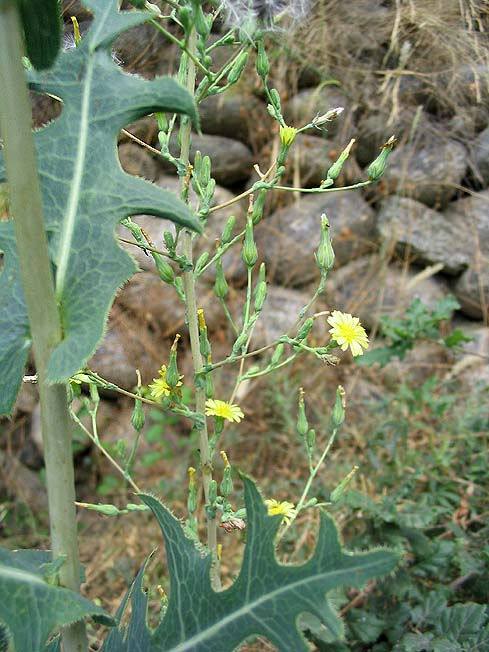
The long auricles at the base of the leaf might appear clasping.

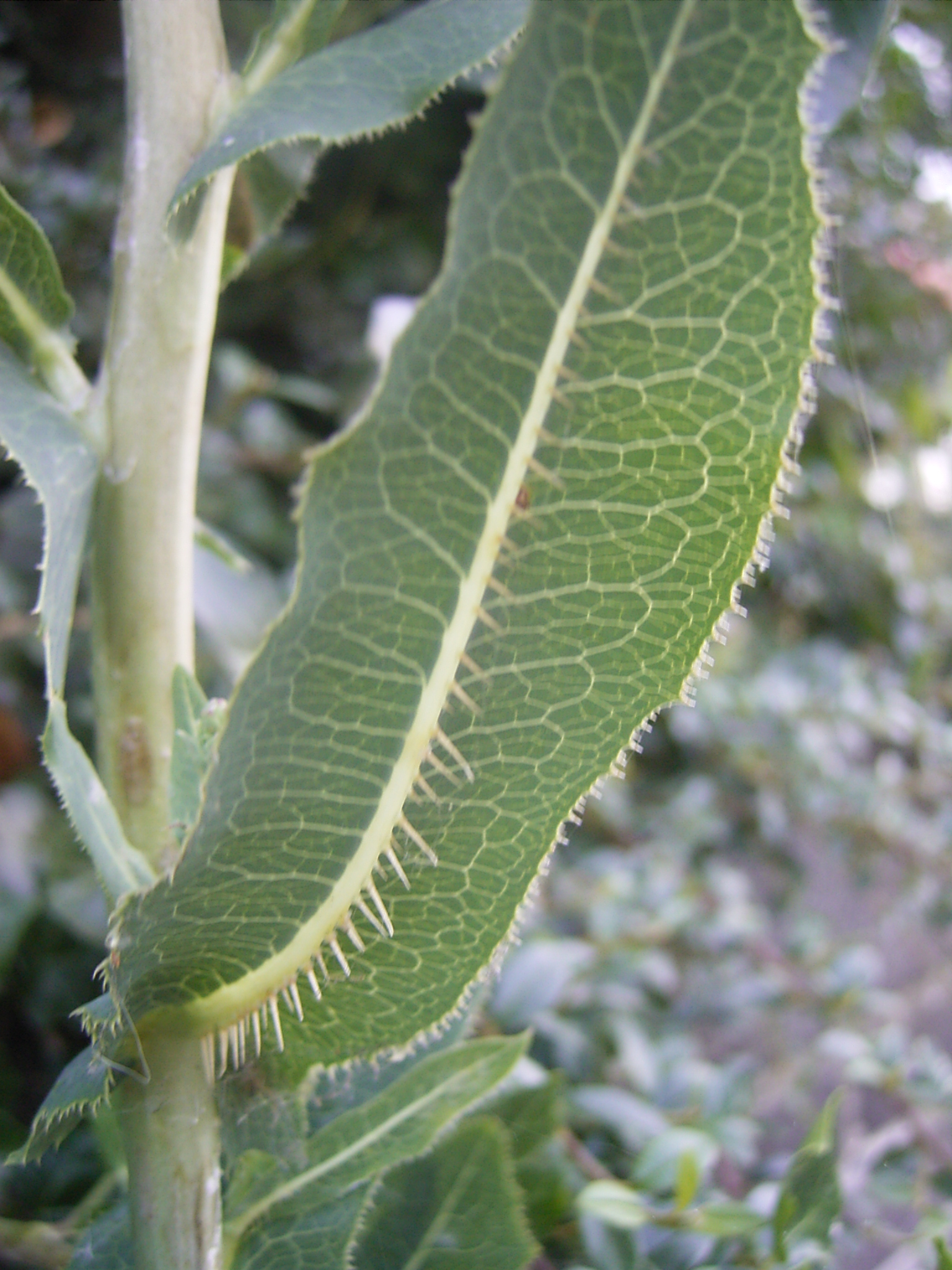
Close-up of Lactuca serriola leaf showing fine spines

Lactuca serriola has a spineless reddish stem, containing a milky latex, growing up to 2 metres (6 ft 7 in).

The leaves get progressively smaller as they reach its top. They are oblong or lanceolate, often pinnately lobed and (especially for the lower leaves), waxy grey green. Fine spines are present along the veins and leaf edges. The undersides have whitish veins. They emit latex when cut.

The flower heads are 1–1.5 cm (1/2–1/2 in) wide, pale yellow, often tinged purple, with 12–20 ray flowers but no disc flowers. The bracts are also often tinged purple. It flowers from July until September in the northern hemisphere. The achenes are grey, tipped with bristles. The pappus is white with equal length hairs.

Lactuca serriola is known as the compass plant because in the sun the upper leaves twist round to hold their margins upright, pointing roughly south or north from the stem.

Similar to Mycelis muralis but showing more than 5 florets.

== Distribution ==
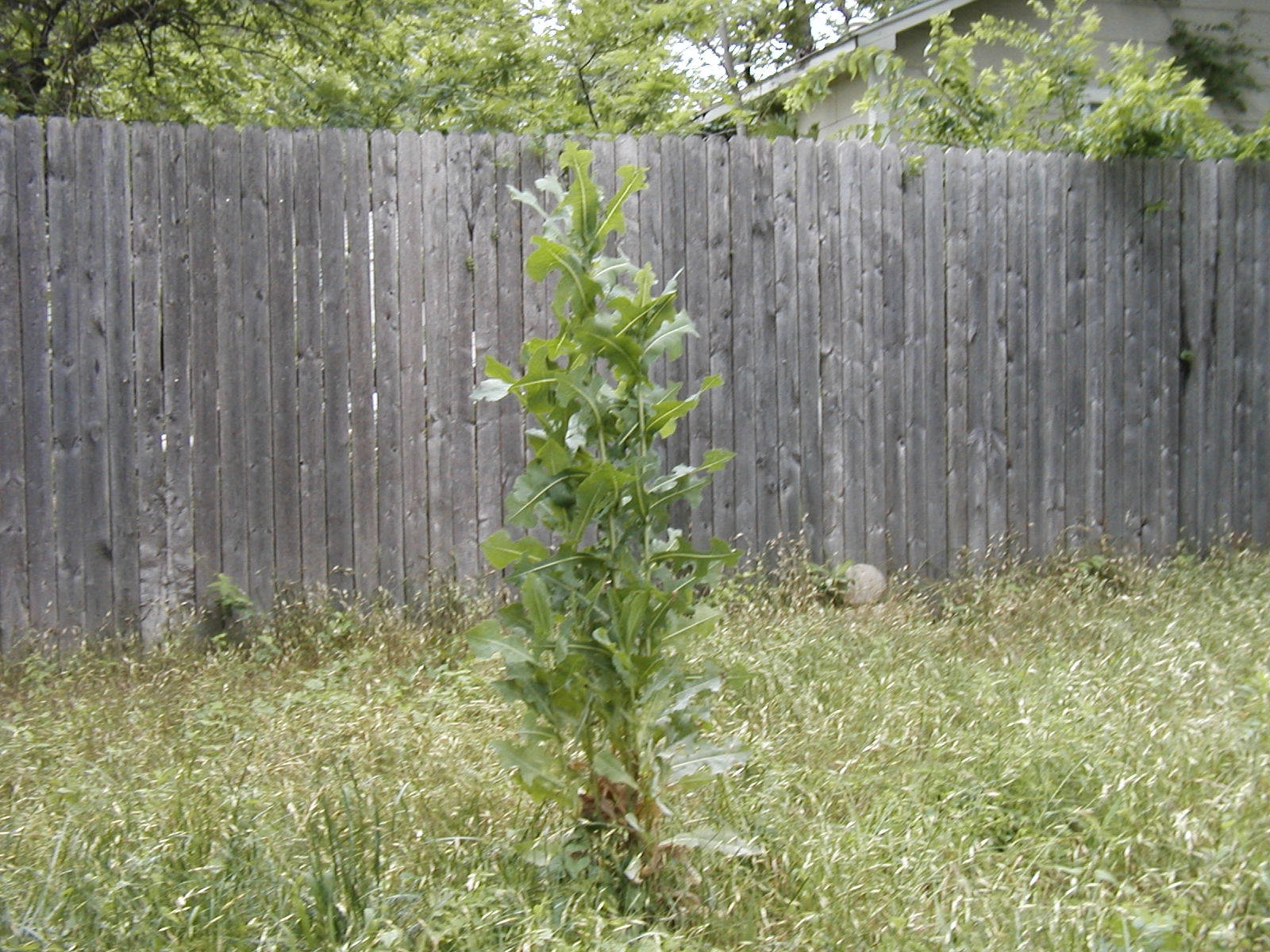
A cluster of nine L. serriola, growing to a height of 5.5 ft (1.7 m)

Lactuca serriola is native to Europe, Asia, and North Africa, and has become naturalized elsewhere.

== Pathogen resistance ==
Lactuca serriola is the wild progenitor of cultivated lettuce (Lactuca sativa) and can be affected by lettuce downy mildew, one of the most serious diseases of lettuce. L. serriola has shown resistance to the plant pathogen Bremia lactucae, the cause of the disease. This pathogen is able to undergo sexual reproduction, and once virulent strains have been produced, can undergo rapid asexual reproductive cycles. As a result, there are many strains, which vary in virulence.

Resistance to Bremia lactucae in Lactuca serriola is due to Dm genes, or single dominant genes. Nine of the dominant genes that confer resistance are Dml, Dm, Dm3, Dm6, Dml4, Dml5, DmlO, Dm5/8, Dm10, Dm4, Dm7, Dm11, and Dm13. These genes are mapped in four linkage groups, so the genes within each group will be more likely to be inherited together. Lactuca serriola and B. lactucae have a gene-for-gene relationship, meaning that each resistance gene in the plant is associated with a specific gene in the pathogen, with avirulence being dominant to virulence. The possible combinations of these Dm genes can provide the plant with resistance to multiple strains of Bremia lactucae.

Testing for the presence of new resistance factors is conducted by screening samples of L. serriola with various isolates of B. lactucae. Samples of L. serriola can be found around the world with genetic diversity between populations regarding the Dm genes. This genetic diversity is considered a resource for lettuce breeding because it provides a greater variety of genes to be used in response to new strains of B. lactucae, which continually emerge. There is especially high diversity within the Mediterranean area and Southwest Asia, but L. serriola has established populations on all continents and has the most widespread distribution compared to other Lactuca species.

== Toxicity ==
It can cause pulmonary emphysema in cattle feeding exclusively on the plant.

== Uses ==
Lactuca serriola can be eaten as a salad, although it has something of a bitter taste. Young leaves can be eaten raw or cooked. Older leaves can be steamed. While unsubstantial, its roots have been used as a coffee substitute.

Its presence in some ancient deposits has been linked more to its soporific properties which might suggest ritual use. The Ancient Greeks also believed its pungent juice to be a remedy against eye ulcers and Pythagoreans called the lettuce eunuch because it caused urination and relaxed sexual desire. Following its accidental introduction to North America, the Navajo began to use the plant as a ceremonial emetic. In the island of Crete in Greece the leaves and the tender shoots of a variety called maroula (μαρούλα) or agriomaroulo (αγριομάρουλο) are eaten boiled. It is used by a growing number of Jews and Samaritans as the Maror (bitter herb) on Passover (or Pesach in Hebrew).

Lactuca serriola contains lactucarium, which is the milky sap (white latex) that flows through the stem of the plant. It is used as a medicinal herb when air-dried. Although the standard definition of lactucarium requires its production from Lactuca virosa, it was recognized that smaller quantities of lactucarium could be produced in a similar way from Lactuca sativa and Lactuca canadensis var. elongata, and even that lettuce-opium obtained from Lactuca serriola or Lactuca quercina was of superior quality.

== In culture ==
The Egyptian god Min is associated with this species of lettuce. Also, archaeobotanical evidence in Greek archaeological contexts is scanty, although uncarbonised seeds have been retrieved from a 7th-century BC deposit in a sanctuary of Hera on Samos. It is also described by Theophrastus. In mythology, Aphrodite is said to have laid Adonis in a lettuce bed, leading to the vegetable's association with food for the dead.
