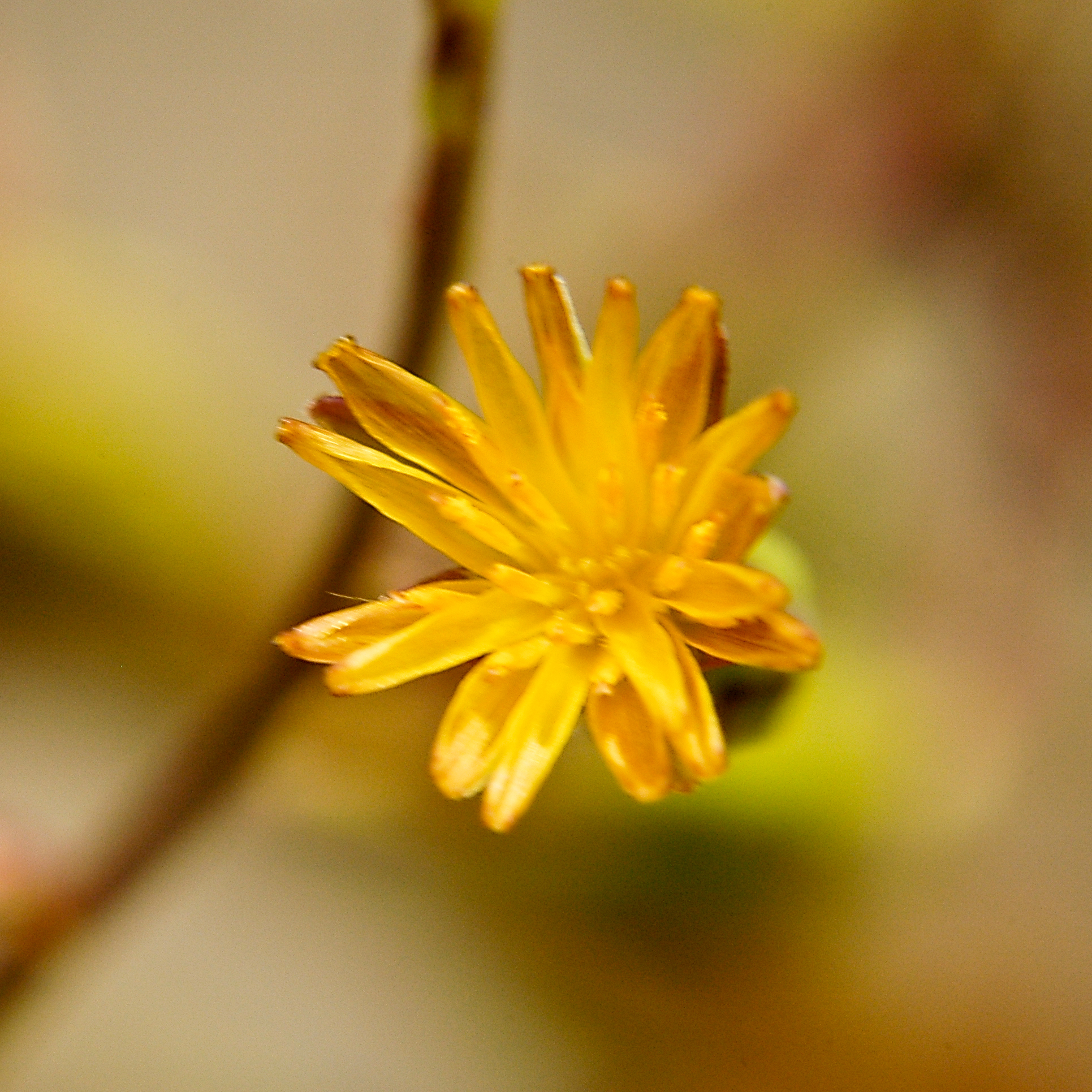

Conservation status
- Secure (NatureServe)

Scientific classification
- Kingdom: Plantae
- Clade: Tracheophytes
- Clade: Angiosperms
- Clade: Eudicots
- Clade: Asterids
- Order: Asterales
- Family: Asteraceae
- Genus: Lactuca
- Species: L. canadensis

Binomial name
- Lactuca canadensis L.

Synonyms
- Synonymy: Cicerbita canadensis (L.) Wallr.; Cicerbita elongata (Willd.) Wallr.; Galathenium elongatum (Muhl. ex Willd.) Nutt.; Galathenium salicifolium Nutt.; Lactuca sagittifolia Elliott; Lactuca steelei Britton; Mulgedium canadense (L.) Farw.; Mulgedium integrifolium Cass.; Wiestia canadensis (L.) Sch.Bip.; Wiestia elongata (Willd.) Sch.Bip.

= Lactuca canadensis =

Species of lettuce

Lactuca canadensis is a species of wild lettuce known by the common names Canada lettuce, Canada wild lettuce, and tall lettuce. Its true native range is not clear, but it is considered to be a native of the eastern and central parts of North America. It is naturalized in the western part of the continent as well as in Eurasia.

Generally, Lactuca canadensis is a biennial herb in the daisy family growing from a taproot to maximum heights of 50–200 cm (19.5–78.5 in) or more. The leaves are deeply lobed and occasionally toothed. The top of the stem bears an inflorescence with many flower heads, each up to 1 cm (0.5 in) wide when open. The heads have many pale yellow ray florets but no disc florets. The fruit is a dark-colored achene about half a centimeter (0.2 inches) long with a white pappus.

== Description ==
It is an annual biennial dicot that may appear to be a weedy plant, but is variable in appearance. Typically leaves are 7.6 cm–20.3 cm long, but may be found up to 25.4 cm long and 7.6 cm across. They have an oblong shape, wider at bases, and come to a point at the tip. The stem is glabrous and often glaucous, with light or reddish green color. Leaves are alternate mostly with deep pinnate lobes; however, small leaves have shallow lobes or none at all. Leaf surface color ranges from shiny to dull in light to dark green pigments that sometimes may appear in purple or yellow shear cast. Leaves are slightly toothed along margins with small hairs along underside of leaf vein.

Flower heads appear dandelion-like, attach at the apex of the stem, and are 8 mm across. The florets are yellowish or slightly red to orange in color, consisting of 12–25 per plant. The base of the flower head has several floral bracts that appear light green and glabrous. Flowers bloom in late summer or early fall for approximately 3–4 weeks. The flower does not seem to emit noticeable scent. After the blooming period, flowers are replaced by dark achenes with tufts of white hair. The achenes have a longitudinal ridge, may have black spots on either side, and are distributed by the wind. They are ovoid and slightly flattened but curved. A plant may have buds, flowers, and achenes simultaneously. Roots are a thick deep taproots that contain a white latex that is apparent when cut.

== Taxonomy ==
Canada lettuce is in the genus Lactuca, a group of flowering plants in the daisy family (Asteraceae), that are commonly is referred to as "lettuces". The genus contains at least 50 species worldwide. Lactuca canadensis was first formally described by Carl Linnaeus in 1759.

It has been seen to hybridize wildly with Lactuca ludoviciana, and it is difficult to differentiate between the two species.

== Range and habitat ==
It occurs across the continental United States, except for Nevada and Arizona, and across most provinces in Canada. It is found commonly in all counties in Illinois.

It grows in moist to dry habitats in a variety of soil types, including black soil, clay, and gravel prairies. Lactuca canadensis can be found in woodlands, thickets, savannas, borders of lakes and rivers, limestone glades, fence rows, pastures, abandoned fields, powerline clearances, road and railroad sides, vacant lots, and waste areas. It is most common in degraded and disturbed habitats, but also may be found in rich and diverse, high-quality habitats.

== Uses ==
Lactuca canadensis contains lactucarium, which is the milky sap (white latex) that flows through the stem, leaves, and roots of the plant. It is used as a medicinal herb when dried after contact with air. A survivalist publication, The Lost Ways, states that its fresh leaves may be used to create a solution that may act as an analgesic and may be stored for later use. It may be used as medicinal treatments for its anodyne, antispasmodic, digestive, diuretic, hypnotic, narcotic, and sedative properties. Concentrations of lactucarium are low in young plants, but increase in older plants, occurring highest when in blooming period. Sap may be applied to skin in use for treatment of external warts. It is said to be a relaxing and sedative herb that is used to induce sleepiness, and to calm restlessness and anxiety. Although the standard definition of lactucarium requires its production from Lactuca virosa, it was recognized that smaller quantities of lactucarium could be produced in a similar way from Lactuca sativa and Lactuca canadensis var. elongata, and even that lettuce-opium obtained from Lactuca serriola or Lactuca quercina was of superior quality.

The plant has not been seen to be toxic, however some plants in the genus contain a narcotic principle that has its highest concentration when in the blooming period. Young leaves and stems may be edible and cooked and eaten as greens.

== Pests ==
Grazing by deer in the Cedar Creek Natural History Area in Minnesota has affected the height and vertical growth of Lactuca canadensis, which is not able to compensate and replenish itself from the damage resulting from the deer grazing. Eastern goldfinches occasionally eat the seeds, limiting dispersal. Mammalian herbivores browse on foliage despite the bitter latex. Cottontail rabbits eat leaves of young plants. Horses, cattle, and sheep have also been seen to graze on the plant.

== Cultivation ==
Cultivation preferably is in moist to slightly dry conditions and in full to partial sun. Loamy soil is best for fertility; however, clay-loam and gravely soil are tolerated. Size depends on growing conditions.
