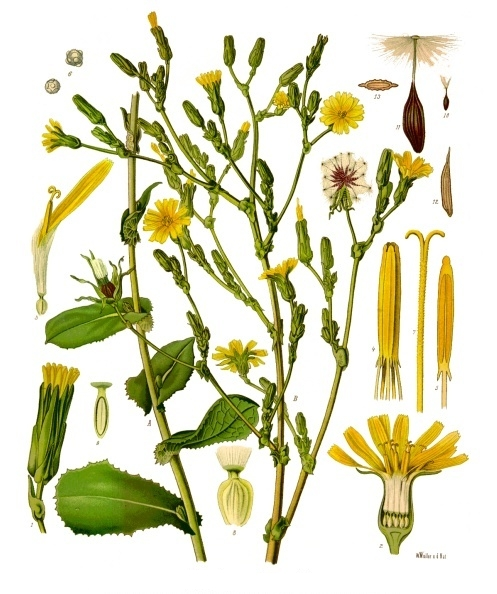
- Wild lettuce (Lactuca virosa)

Scientific classification
- Kingdom: Plantae
- Clade: Embryophytes
- Clade: Tracheophytes
- Clade: Angiosperms
- Clade: Eudicots
- Clade: Asterids
- Order: Asterales
- Family: Asteraceae
- Genus: Lactuca
- Species: L. virosa

Binomial name
- Lactuca virosa L. 1753 not Thunb. 1800 nor Luce nor Hablitz

Synonyms
- Synonymy: Lactuca ambigua Schrad.; Lactuca flavida Jord.; Lactuca lactucarii Lamotte; Lactuca patersonii Menezes; Lactuca romana Garsault; Lactuca schimperi Jord.; Lactuca serratifolia Sennen; Lactuca sinuata Forssk.; Wiestia virosa (L.) Sch.Bip.

= Lactuca virosa =

Wild lettuce

Species of plant

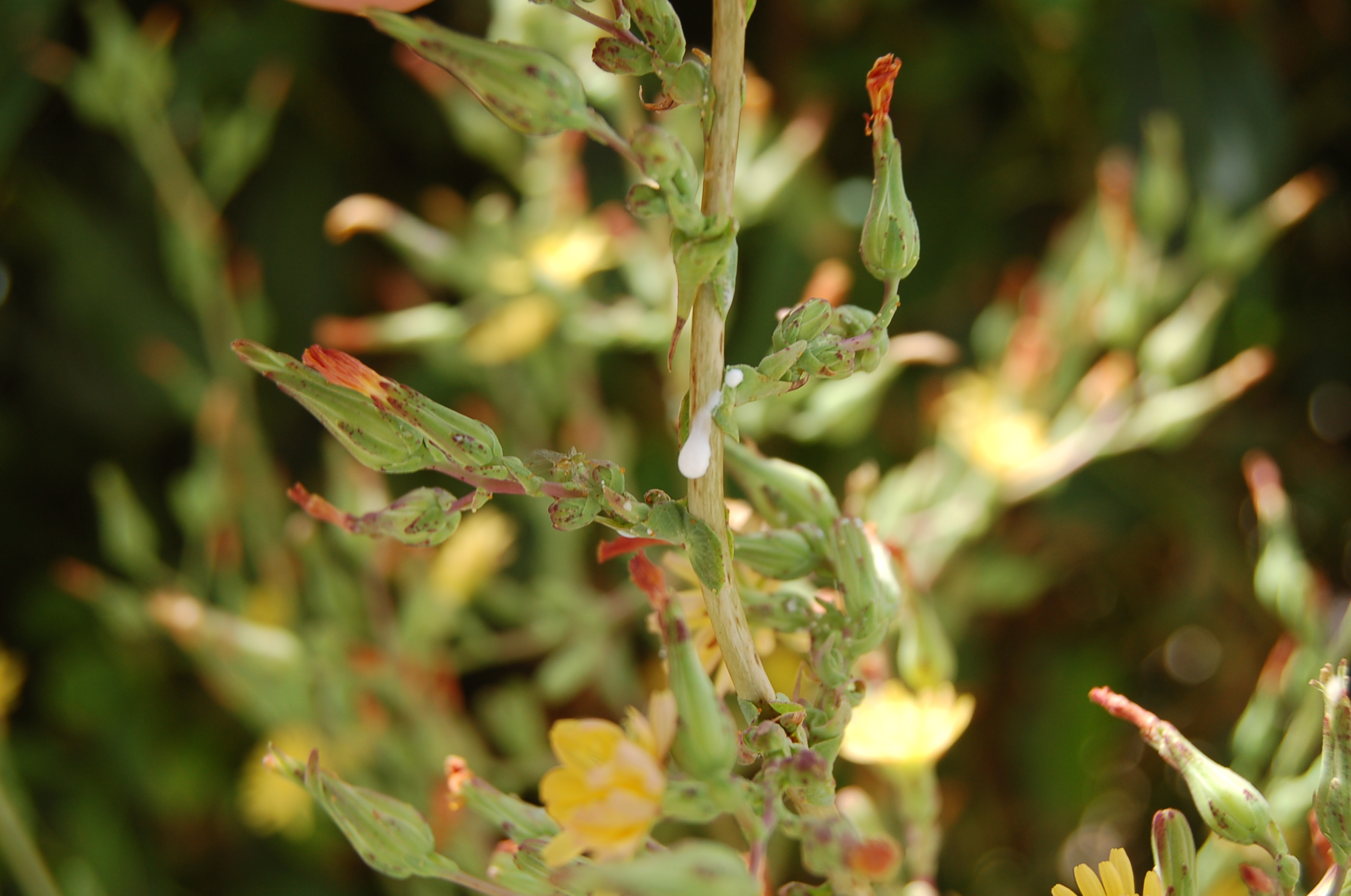
Lactuca virosa

Lactuca virosa is a plant in the Lactuca (lettuce) genus, often ingested for its mild analgesic and sedative effects. It is related to common lettuce (L. sativa), and is often called wild lettuce, bitter lettuce, laitue vireuse, opium lettuce, poisonous lettuce, tall lettuce, great lettuce or rakutu-karyumu-so.

== Description ==
Lactuca virosa is biennial, similar to prickly lettuce Lactuca serriola but taller – it can grow to 200 cm (80 inches or almost 7 feet). It is also stouter, the stem and leaves are more purple flushed, and the leaves are less divided, but more spreading, similarly to Mycelis muralis but showing more than 5 florets.

The achene is purple black, without bristles at the tip. The pappus is identical to that of Lactuca serriola.

In the northern hemisphere, it flowers from July until September.

== Distribution ==
Found coastally in Great Britain, rarely in the north-east of Ireland. Lactuca virosa is widespread across much of central and southern Europe. It can be found locally in the south east and east of England. In the rest of Great Britain it is very rare, and in Ireland it is absent. It is also found in the Punjab region of Pakistan and India and Australia where it grows in the wild.

In North America, it has been documented as introduced in California, Alabama, Iowa, and Washington, DC, and grows wild in other parts of the continent.

== History ==
Lactuca virosa was used in the 19th century by physicians when opium could not be obtained. It was studied extensively by the Council of the Pharmaceutical Society of Great Britain in 1911. They discovered two chemicals responsible for the properties of L. virosa; lactucopicrin and lactucin. In the United States, the plant experienced a resurgence in popularity in the 1970s. Today the plant is un-scheduled by the Food and Drug Administration (FDA), meaning it is legal to grow, purchase, and own without prescription or license.

"Wild Salad" has long been known in the world of "natural remedies" or "alternative treatments". It is often referred to as the poor man's opium.

== Pharmacology ==
A latex which is called lactucarium can be derived from the extract of the stem secretions of Lactuca virosa. Oils and extracts can also be produced from L. virosa. These oils and extracts have sedative properties in rodents. Although the standard definition of lactucarium requires its production from Lactuca virosa, it was recognized that smaller quantities of lactucarium could be produced in a similar way from Lactuca sativa and Lactuca canadensis var. elongata, and even that lettuce-opium obtained from Lactuca serriola or Lactuca quercina was of superior quality.

Lactuca virosa contains flavonoids, coumarins, and N-methyl-β-phenethylamine. A variety of other chemical compounds have been isolated from L. virosa. One of the compounds, lactucopicrin, has been shown to act as an acetylcholinesterase inhibitor in vitro.
