= Anodyne =

Historical term for a pain-killing drug

An anodyne is medication used to lessen pain through reducing the sensitivity of the brain or nervous system. The term was common in medicine before the 20th century, but such drugs are now more often known as analgesics or painkillers.

The term anodyne derives from Greek anōdynos (ἀνώδυνος), from an- (αν-, "without") and odynē (ὀδύνη, "pain"). Etymologically, the word covers any substance that reduces pain, but doctors used it more narrowly. Some definitions restrict the term to topical medications, including herbal simples such as onion, lily, root of mallows, leaves of violet, and elderberry. Other definitions include ingested narcotics, hypnotics, and opioids. In the 19th century, the primary anodynes were opium, henbane, hemlock, tobacco, nightshade (stramonium), and chloroform.

Certain compound medicines were also called by this name, such as anodyne balsam, made of castile soap, camphor, saffron, and spirit of wine, and digested in a sand heat. It was recommended not only for easing extreme pain, but also for assisting in discharging the diseased tissue that caused or occurred with the pain.

In literary usage, the word ""anodyne" may figuratively mean "soothing or relaxing" (since the 18th century) or even "non-contentious", "blandly agreeable", or unlikely to cause offence or debate.

== See also ==
- Hua Tuo
- Mandrake
