= Lactucarium =

Psychoactive fluid secreted by lettuce

- Source plant(s): Lactuca spp.
- Part(s) of plant: Latex (see also seeds)
- Geographic origin: Southern Europe
- Uses: Analgesic, sleep aid, euphoriant
- Legal status: In general: unscheduled

Lactucarium is the milky fluid secreted by several species of lettuce, especially Lactuca virosa, usually from the base of the stems. It is known as lettuce opium because of its sedative and analgesic properties. It has also been reported to promote a mild sensation of euphoria. Because it is a latex, lactucarium physically resembles opium, in that it is excreted as a white fluid and can be reduced to a thick smokable solid.

== History ==
Mentions of lettuce as a medicinal herb goes back as least as early as the Medieval period in Europe. The drug was studied in Poland during the nineteenth century, with the studies regarding it as a less potent but less addictive alternative to opium. However, early efforts to isolate an active alkaloid were unsuccessful. It is described and standardized in the 1898 United States Pharmacopoeia and 1911 British Pharmaceutical Codex for use in lozenges, tinctures, and syrups as a sedative for irritable cough or as a mild hypnotic (sleeping aid) for insomnia. The standard definition of lactucarium in these codices required its production from Lactuca virosa, but it was recognized that smaller quantities of lactucarium could be produced in a similar way from Lactuca sativa and Lactuca canadensis var. elongata, and even that lettuce-opium obtained from Lactuca serriola or Lactuca quercina was of superior quality.

In the twentieth century, two major studies found commercial lactucarium to be without effect. In 1944, Fulton concluded, "Modern medicine considers its sleep producing qualities a superstition, its therapeutic action doubtful or nil." Another study of the time identified active bitter principles lactucin and lactucopicrin, but noted that these compounds from the fresh latex were unstable and did not remain in commercial preparations of lactucarium. Accordingly, lettuce opium fell from favor, until publications of the hippie movement began to promote it in the mid-1970s as a legal drug producing euphoria, sometimes compounded with catnip or damiana. More recent work has confirmed that lactucin and lactucopicrin do have analgesic and sedative properties.

The seeds of lettuce have also been used to relieve pain. Lettuce seed was listed as an anaesthetic in Avicenna's The Canon of Medicine, which served as an authoritative medical textbook from soon after AD 1000 until the seventeenth century.

== Contemporary use ==
Although lactucarium has faded from general use as a pain reliever, it remains available, sometimes promoted as a legal psychotropic.

The seed of ordinary lettuce, Lactuca sativa, is still used in Avicenna's native Iran as a folk medicine.

== Chemical constituents ==
Chemical compounds which occur in lettuce: (1) α-lactucerol (taraxasterol); (2) β-lactucerol (lactucon, lactucerin); (3) lactucin; (4) lactucopicrin

The chemical constituents of lactucarium that have been investigated for biological activity include lactucin and its derivatives lactucopicrin and 11β,13-dihydrolactucin. Lactucin and lactucopicrin were found to have analgesic effects comparable to those of ibuprofen, and sedative activity in measurements of spontaneous movements of the mice. Some effects have also been credited to a trace of hyoscyamine in Lactuca virosa, but the alkaloid was undetectable in standard lactucarium. A crude extract of the seeds was shown to have analgesic and anti-inflammatory effects in standard formalin and carrageenan tests of laboratory rats. It was not toxic to the rats at a dose of 6 grams per kilogram.

Lactuca virosa contains flavonoids, coumarins, and N-methyl-β-phenethylamine. A variety of other chemical compounds have been isolated from L. virosa. One of the compounds, lactucin, is an adenosine receptor agonist in vitro, while another, lactucopicrin, has been shown to act as an acetylcholinesterase inhibitor in vitro.

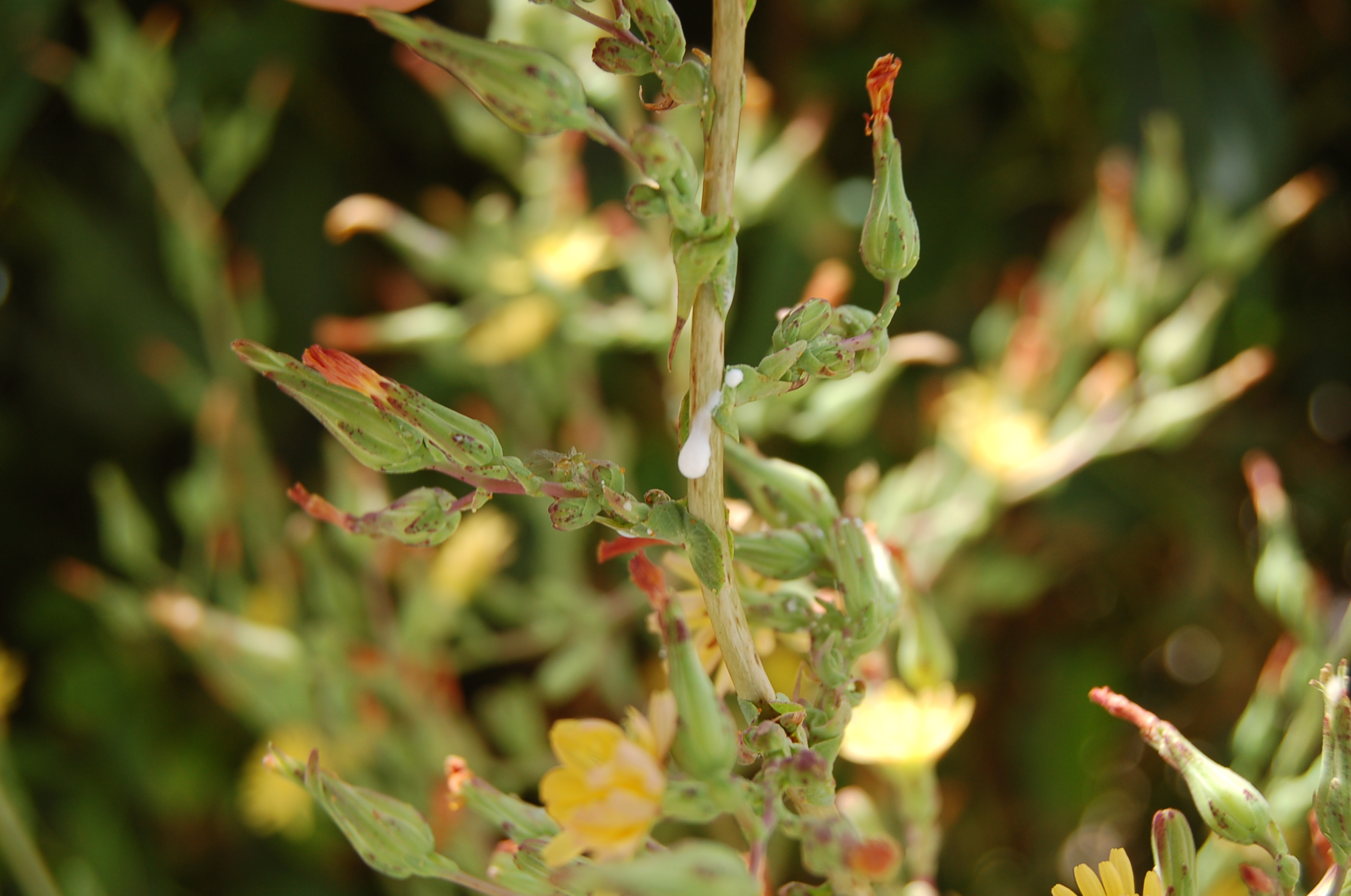
Lactuca virosa

Lactuca floridana was found to contain 11β,13-Dihydro-lactucin-8-O-acetate hemihydrate.

== Formulations ==
Lactucarium was used unmodified in lozenges, 30–60 milligrams (0.5 to 1 grain), sometimes mixed with borax. However, it was found to be more efficient to formulate the drug in a cough syrup (Syrupus Lactucarii, U.S.P.) containing net 5% lactucarium, 22% glycerin, 5% alcohol, and 5% orange-flower water in syrup.
